= 2023 Cincinnati Reds season =

2023 Cincinnati Reds
- League: National League
- Division: Central
- Ballpark: Great American Ball Park
- City: Cincinnati, Ohio
- Record: 82–80 (.506)
- Divisional place: 3rd
- Owners: Bob Castellini
- General managers: Nick Krall
- Managers: David Bell
- Television: Bally Sports Ohio
- Radio: WLW (700 AM); Reds Radio Network
- Stats: ESPN.com; Baseball Reference

The 2023 Cincinnati Reds season was the 154th season for the franchise in Major League Baseball, and their 21st at Great American Ball Park in Cincinnati. The Reds drew an average home attendance of 25,164 in 81 home games in the 2023 MLB season, the 18th highest in the league. The total attendance was 2,038,310.

With a win over the Cleveland Guardians on August 16, the Reds improved on their 62–100 record from the 2022 season.

From June 10 to June 23, the Reds had a 12 game winning streak, their third best in franchise history, and second best of the season, only behind the Tampa Bay Rays 13 game winning streak.

Despite the winning streak during the season, the Reds were eliminated from post season contention after a September 30 loss to the St. Louis Cardinals.

== Off-season ==
=== Rule changes ===
Pursuant to the CBA, new rule changes are in place for the 2023 season:

- institution of a pitch clock between pitches;
- limits on pickoff attempts per plate appearance;
- limits on defensive shifts requiring two infielders to be on either side of second and be within the boundary of the infield; and
- larger bases (increased to 18-inch squares);

=== Transactions ===
==== October 2022 ====
October 6	Activated RHP Justin Dunn from the 15-day IL. Activated LHP Mike Minor from the 15-day IL. Activated CF TJ Friedl from the 10-day IL. Recalled RHPs Kyle Dowdy, Daniel Duarte, Raynel Espinal, Ryan Hendrix, Dauri Moreta and Jared Solomon from Louisville Bats. Recalled Cs Mark Kolozsvary and Michael Papierski from Louisville Bats. Recalled OF Allan Cerda from Chattanooga Lookouts. Sent RHP Robert Dugger outright to Louisville Bats.
October 14	Sent RHPs Raynel Espinal and Ryan Hendrix outright to Louisville Bats. Sent C Chuckie Robinson outright to Louisville Bats. Baltimore Orioles claimed Cs Aramis Garcia and Mark Kolozsvary off waivers. Detroit Tigers claimed C Michael Papierski off waivers.

==== November 2022 ====
November 6	RHPs Chase Anderson and Hunter Strickland, LHP Justin Wilson, C Austin Romine and 2B Donovan Solano elected free agency.
November 8	Activated RHPs Tejay Antone, Vladimir Gutierrez, Jeff Hoffman, Tony Santillan, Lucas Sims and Art Warren, 1B Joey Votto, OF Nick Senzel, 3B Mike Moustakas and C Tyler Stephenson from the 60-day IL. LHP Mike Minor elected free agency.
November 14	Signed free agent RHP Kevin Herget to a minor league contract. Acquired 2B Nick Solak from the Texas Rangers for cash.
November 15	Selected the contracts of RHPs Ricky Karcher and Levi Stoudt and LHP Brandon Williamson from Louisville Bats. Selected contract of SS Elly De La Cruz from Chattanooga Lookouts. Selected contracts of RHP Lyon Richardson and Noelvi Marte from Dayton Dragons. Designated RHPs Kyle Dowdy, Jeff Hoffman, Derek Law, Jared Solomon and Art Warren and RF Aristides Aquino for assignment.
November 18	Acquired RHP Casey Legumina from the Minnesota Twins for 2B Kyle Farmer. Acquired SS Kevin Newman from the Pittsburgh Pirates for RHP Dauri Moreta. RHPs Kyle Dowdy, Daniel Duarte, Jeff Hoffman, Derek Law, Jared Solomon and Art Warren, OF Allan Cerda and RF Aristides Aquino elected free agency. Invited non-roster RHP Ben Lively to spring training.
November 19	Signed free agent RHP Nick Howard to a minor league contract.
November 22	Signed free agent RHP Daniel Duarte and OF Allan Cerda to a minor league contract and invited them to spring training.
November 28	Signed free agent C Luke Maile to a 1-year, $1.175 contract.

==== December 2022 ====
December 6	Signed free agent Cs Jhonny Pereda and Chuckie Robinson and RHP Jared Solomon to a minor league contract and invited them to spring training.
December 7	Claimed C Blake Sabol off waivers from the Indianapolis Indians. Signed free agent RHP Silvino Bracho to a minor league contract and invited him to spring training.
December 8	Traded C Blake Sabol to the San Francisco Giants.
December 13	Acquired RHP Jake Wong from the San Francisco Giants.
December 22	Signed free agent 1B Wil Myers to a 1-year, $7.5 million contract and C Curt Casali to a 1-year, $3.25 million contract. Designated 3B Mike Moustakas for assignment.

==== January 2023 ====
January 2	Signed free agent RHP Alan Busenitz to a minor league contract.
January 3	Signed free agent RHP Zack Brown to a minor league contract.
January 4	Activated 3B Matt Reynolds.
January 5	Released 3B Mike Moustakas.
January 7	Signed free agent RHP Tayron Guerrero to a minor league contract and invited him to spring training. Activated RHP Justin Dunn, SS Spencer Steer and OF Michael Siani.
January 12	Signed free agent RF Henry Ramos to a minor league contract and invited him to spring training.
January 13	Signed free agent RHP Luke Weaver to a 1-year, $2 million contract. Designated 3B Matt Reynolds for assignment.
January 15	Signed free agent RHP's Enmanuel Talavera, Andre Vazquez, Sergio Villa, Rafael Leon and Irvin Gonzalez, LHP Bryan Diaz, C Alfredo Duno, 2B Anielson Buten, SS's Rafhlmil Torres, Alfredo Alcantara, Brauli Diaz and Brayan Joseph and OF's Yeycol Soriano and Angel De La Cruz to a minor league contract.
January 17	Signed free agent LHP Alex Young and SS Richie Martin to a minor league contract and invited them to spring training. Invited non-roster 3B Christian Encarnacion-Strand, 1B Alex McGarry, SS Matt McLain, RHP Connor Phillips and LHP Andrew Abbott to spring training.
January 19	Sent 3B Matt Reynolds to the Louisville Bats.
January 20	Invited non-roster 3B Matt Reynolds to spring training.
January 23	Signed free agent RHP Derek Law to a minor league contract and invited him to spring training.

==== February 2023 ====
February 1	Signed free agent 3B Jason Vosler and LF Chad Pinder to a minor league contract and invited them to spring training.
February 3	Signed free agent RHP John Murphy, CF Nick Plummer and LF Nick Martini to a minor league contract.
February 8	Acquired RF Will Benson and cash from the Cleveland Guardians for OF Justin Boyd and Steve Hajjar. Designated 2B Alejo Lopez for assignment.
February 9	Signed free agent RHP's Tommy Eveld and Wilmer Rios to a minor league contract.
February 10	Signed free agent OF Pedro Alfonseca to a minor league contract.
February 14	Sent 2B Alejo Lopez outright to Louisville Bats.
February 15	Signed free agent LHP Daniel Norris to a minor league contract and invited him to spring training. Signed free agent RHP Angel Zazueta to a minor league contract.
February 16	Signed free agent LHP Christian Lopez to a minor league contract.
February 18	Signed free agent RHP Hunter Strickland to a minor league contract and invited him to spring training. Signed free agent RHP Chase Anderson to a minor league contract.
February 20	Signed free agent IF Yael Romero to a minor league contract.
February 22	Claimed LHP Bennett Sousa off waivers from Chicago White Sox.
February 25	Assigned RHP's Pedro Garcia, Ryan Nutof and Randy Wynne, 2B's Ivan Johnson and Alejo Lopez, C James Free and CF T.J. Hopkins to the Cincinnati Reds.
February 26	Assigned RHP's Manuel Cachutt and Brooks Crawford, C Daniel Vellojin and SS Steven Leyton to the Cincinnati Reds.
February 27	Assigned RHP Spencer Stockton and LHP Connor Curlis to the Cincinnati Reds.
February 28	Assigned LHP Evan Kravetz to the Cincinnati Reds.

==== March 2023 ====
March 1	Assigned LF Nick Martini, OF Jay Allen II, SS Quincey McAfee and C Eric Yang to the Cincinnati Reds.
March 4	Assigned RHP Mac Sceroler and Donovan Benoit, C Hayden Jones, 2B's Brian Rey and Tyler Callihan, 3B's Nick Quintana, Nicholas Northcut and Michel Triana, SS Edwin Arroyo and OF Austin Hendrick to the Cincinnati Reds.
March 5	Assigned RHP's Michael Byrne and Hunter Strickland to the Cincinnati Reds.
March 6	Assigned RHP Chase Anderson to the Cincinnati Reds.
March 8	Signed free agent Andy Yerzy to a minor league contract.
March 10	Assigned SS's Leonardo Balcazar and Ilvin Fernandez to the Cincinnati Reds.
March 11	Assigned C Michael Trautwein and SS Francisco Urbaez to the Cincinnati Reds. Optioned RHP Levi Stoudt and 2B Nick Solak to the Louisville Bats. Optioned RHP Lyon Richardson to the Chattanooga Lookouts.
March 12	Optioned OF Michael Siani to the Louisville Bats. Optioned SS Noelvi Marte to the Chattanooga Lookouts.
March 14	Assigned SS Carlos Jorge and OF's Blake Dunn and Jack Rogers to the Cincinnati Reds.
March 15	Assigned OF Justice Thompson to the Cincinnati Reds. Optioned RHP's Ricky Karcher and Casey Legumina and SS Elly De La Cruz to the Louisville Bats.
March 17	Assigned 3B Austin Callahan and CF Ashton Creel to the Cincinnati Reds.
March 18	Assigned C Cade Hunter to the Cincinnati Reds.
March 20	Optioned OF Stuart Fairchild to the Louisville Bats.
March 23	Assigned OF Rece Hinds to the Cincinnati Reds.
March 24	Optioned LHP Brandon Williamson to the Louisville Bats.
March 25	Assigned SS Jose Serrano to the Cincinnati Reds.
March 26	Assigned LHP Andy Fisher to the Cincinnati Reds. Traded LHP Steve Hajjar to the Cleveland Guardians.
March 27	Optioned LHP Bennett Sousa to the Louisville Bats. Signed free agent RHP Hunter Strickland.
March 28	Released SS Richie Martin.

== Regular season ==
=== Game log ===
Legend
Reds Win	Reds Loss	Game postponed	Eliminated from playoff race

2023 Game Log: 82–80 (Home: 38–43; Away: 44–37)
March/April: 12–16 (Home: 9–6; Away: 3–10)

#	Date	Opponent	Score	Win	Loss	Save	Attendance	Record	Streak
1	March 30	Pirates	4–5	Zastryzny (1–0)	Farmer (0–1)	Bednar (1)	44,063	0–1	L1
2	April 1	Pirates	6–2	Lodolo (1–0)	Hill (0–1)	—	22,224	1–1	W1
3	April 2	Pirates	3–1	Ashcraft (1–0)	Velasquez (0–1)	Díaz (1)	14,421	2–1	W2
4	April 3	Cubs	7–6	Cruz (1–0)	Smyly (0–1)	Law (1)	11,941	3–1	W3
5	April 4	Cubs	5–12	Alzolay (1–0)	Farmer (0–2)	—	13,399	3–2	L1
–	April 5	Cubs	Postponed (rain); Makeup: September 1 as a split doubleheader						
–	April 6	@ Phillies	Postponed (rain); Makeup: April 7						
6	April 7	@ Phillies	2–5	Soto (1–1)	Law (0–1)	Kimbrel (1)	44,365	3–3	L2
7	April 8	@ Phillies	2–3	Vasquez (1–0)	Díaz (0–1)	—	44,526	3–4	L3
8	April 9	@ Phillies	6–4	Herget (1–0)	Domínguez (0–1)	Gibaut (1)	39,129	4–4	W1
9	April 10	@ Braves	4–5 (10)	Lee (1–0)	Law (0–2)	—	30,237	4–5	L1
10	April 11	@ Braves	6–7	Tonkin (1–1)	Cessa (0–1)	Anderson (1)	33,559	4–6	L2
11	April 12	@ Braves	4–5	Yates (1–0)	Farmer (0–3)	Minter (2)	30,648	4–7	L3
12	April 13	Phillies	6–2	Lodolo (2–0)	Falter (0–2)	Díaz (2)	12,170	5–7	W1
13	April 14	Phillies	3–8	Walker (1–1)	Overton (0–1)	—	17,610	5–8	L1
14	April 15	Phillies	13–0	Ashcraft (2–0)	Strahm (1–1)	—	25,860	6–8	W1
15	April 16	Phillies	3–14	Nola (1–2)	Cessa (0–2)	—	13,115	6–9	L1
16	April 17	Rays	8–1	Gibaut (1–0)	Beeks (0–1)	—	7,375	7–9	W1
17	April 18	Rays	0–10	Bradley (2–0)	Lodolo (2–1)	—	11,304	7–10	L1
18	April 19	Rays	0–8	Rasmussen (3–1)	Stoudt (0–1)	—	10,205	7–11	L2
19	April 20	@ Pirates	3–4	Contreras (2–1)	Weaver (0–1)	Bednar (6)	14,051	7–12	L3
20	April 21	@ Pirates	2–4	Keller (2–0)	Law (0–3)	Bednar (7)	17,276	7–13	L4
21	April 22	@ Pirates	1–2	Hill (2–2)	Cessa (0–3)	Underwood Jr. (2)	12,575	7–14	L5
22	April 23	@ Pirates	0–2	Velasquez (3–2)	Greene (0–1)	Bednar (8)	11,372	7–15	L6
23	April 24	Rangers	7–6	Díaz (1–1)	Leclerc (0–1)	—	8,810	8–15	W1
24	April 25	Rangers	7–6	Sanmartin (1–0)	Kennedy (0–1)	Díaz (3)	9,969	9–15	W2
25	April 26	Rangers	5–3	Sims (1–0)	Hernández (0–1)	—	10,256	10–15	W3
26	April 28	@ Athletics	11–7	Cessa (1–3)	Rucinski (0–1)	—	6,423	11–15	W4
27	April 29	@ Athletics	3–2	Legumina (1–0)	Familia (0–1)	Díaz (4)	7,052	12–15	W5
28	April 30	@ Athletics	4–5	Jackson (2–1)	Law (0–4)	—	18,271	12–16	L1

May: 14–13 (Home: 5–8; Away: 9–5)

#	Date	Opponent	Score	Win	Loss	Save	Attendance	Record	Streak
29	May 1	@ Padres	3–8	Snell (1–4)	Weaver (0–2)	Tapia (1)	37,491	12–17	L2
30	May 2	@ Padres	2–1 (10)	Law (1–4)	García (1–3)	Díaz (5)	43,127	13–17	W1
31	May 3	@ Padres	1–7	Lugo (3–2)	Cessa (1–4)	—	30,531	13–18	L1
32	May 5	White Sox	4–5	Lynn (1–4)	Greene (0–2)	López (4)	23,467	13–19	L2
33	May 6	White Sox	5–3	Law (2–4)	Clevinger (2–3)	Díaz (6)	25,543	14–19	W1
34	May 7	White Sox	4–17	Kopech (1–3)	Ashcraft (2–1)	—	20,338	14–20	L1
35	May 9	Mets	7–6	Weaver (1–2)	Peterson (1–5)	Díaz (7)	14,065	15–20	W1
36	May 10	Mets	1–2	Verlander (1–1)	Greene (0–3)	Robertson (7)	14,515	15–21	L1
37	May 11	Mets	5–0	Lively (1–0)	Senga (4–2)	Herget (1)	14,855	16–21	W1
38	May 12	@ Marlins	7–4	Gibaut (2–0)	Floro (2–2)	Díaz (8)	13,938	17–21	W2
39	May 13	@ Marlins	6–5	Gibaut (3–0)	Alcántara (1–4)	Díaz (9)	11,170	18–21	W3
40	May 14	@ Marlins	1–3	Scott (3–1)	Herget (1–1)	Floro (2)	11,216	18–22	L1
41	May 15	@ Rockies	8–9	Bard (1–0)	Lively (1–1)	Johnson (7)	20,259	18–23	L2
42	May 16	@ Rockies	3–1	Law (3–4)	Lambert (0–1)	Díaz (10)	20,611	19–23	W1
43	May 17	@ Rockies	6–11	Suter (2–0)	Ashcraft (2–2)	Johnson (8)	22,654	19–24	L1
44	May 19	Yankees	2–6	Schmidt (2–4)	Lively (1–2)	—	35,177	19–25	L2
45	May 20	Yankees	4–7 (10)	Holmes (2–2)	Gibaut (3–1)	Weber (1)	41,374	19–26	L3
46	May 21	Yankees	1–4	Abreu (2–1)	Greene (0–4)	Holmes (5)	33,828	19–27	L4
47	May 22	Cardinals	6–5 (10)	Gibaut (4–1)	Helsley (2–3)	—	9,194	20–27	W1
48	May 23	Cardinals	5–8	Wainwright (2–0)	Ashcraft (2–3)	Helsley (6)	14,159	20–28	L1
49	May 24	Cardinals	10–3	Lively (2–2)	Matz (0–6)	—	12,626	21–28	W1
50	May 25	Cardinals	1–2	Mikolas (3–1)	Sims (1–2)	Gallegos (5)	15,978	21–29	L1
51	May 26	@ Cubs	9–0	Greene (1–4)	Steele (6–2)	—	31,946	22–29	W1
52	May 27	@ Cubs	8–5	Farmer (1–3)	Fulmer (0–4)	Díaz (11)	36,372	23–29	W2
53	May 28	@ Cubs	8–5	Ashcraft (3–3)	Smyly (5–2)	Díaz (12)	40,551	24–29	W3
54	May 30	@ Red Sox	9–8	Lively (3–2)	Bello (3–3)	Díaz (13)	31,642	25–29	W4
55	May 31	@ Red Sox	5–4	Gibaut (5–1)	Winckowski (2–1)	Farmer (1)	32,593	26–29	W5

June: 18–9 (Home: 8–6; Away: 10–3)

#	Date	Opponent	Score	Win	Loss	Save	Attendance	Record	Streak
56	June 1	@ Red Sox	2–8	Martin (1–1)	Herget (1–2)	—	31,204	26–30	L1
57	June 2	Brewers	4–5 (11)	Wilson (2–0)	Cruz (1–1)	—	34,073	26–31	L2
58	June 3	Brewers	8–10	Rea (3–3)	Ashcraft (3–4)	Williams (10)	25,485	26–32	L3
59	June 4	Brewers	1–5	Houser (2–1)	Lively (3–3)	—	17,780	26–33	L4
60	June 5	Brewers	2–0	Abbott (1–0)	Teherán (1–2)	Díaz (14)	13,687	27–33	W1
61	June 6	Dodgers	9–8	Salazar (1–0)	Ferguson (3–1)	—	22,602	28–33	W2
62	June 7	Dodgers	8–6	Díaz (2–1)	Phillips (1–2)	—	19,003	29–33	W3
63	June 8	Dodgers	0–6	Kershaw (8–4)	Ashcraft (3–5)	—	24,323	29–34	L1
64	June 9	@ Cardinals	4–7	Montgomery (3–7)	Lively (3–4)	Gallegos (8)	43,238	29–35	L2
65	June 10	@ Cardinals	8–4	Abbott (2–0)	Mikolas (4–3)	—	45,246	30–35	W1
66	June 11	@ Cardinals	4–3	Gibaut (6–1)	Hicks (1–4)	Díaz (15)	42,445	31–35	W2
67	June 12	@ Royals	5–4 (10)	Farmer (2–3)	Hernández (0–4)	Karcher (1)	20,500	32–35	W3
68	June 13	@ Royals	5–4	Williamson (1–0)	Lyles (0–11)	Díaz (16)	16,931	33–35	W4
69	June 14	@ Royals	7–4	Lively (4–4)	Lynch (0–3)	Díaz (17)	13,731	34–35	W5
70	June 16	@ Astros	2–1	Abbott (3–0)	France (2–2)	Díaz (18)	38,621	35–35	W6
71	June 17	@ Astros	10–3	Greene (2–4)	Bielak (3–4)	—	40,136	36–35	W7
72	June 18	@ Astros	9–7 (10)	Gibaut (7–1)	Martinez (1–3)	Young (1)	40,573	37–35	W8
73	June 19	Rockies	5–4	Young (1–0)	Gomber (4–7)	Díaz (19)	20,344	38–35	W9
74	June 20	Rockies	8–6	Young (2–0)	Davis (0–2)	Díaz (20)	28,291	39–35	W10
75	June 21	Rockies	5–3	Gibaut (8–1)	Bard (3–1)	Farmer (2)	23,637	40–35	W11
76	June 23	Braves	11–10	Young (3–0)	McHugh (3–1)	Díaz (21)	43,086	41–35	W12
77	June 24	Braves	6–7	Tonkin (4–2)	Ashcraft (3–6)	Iglesias (11)	43,498	41–36	L1
78	June 25	Braves	6–7	Morton (7–6)	Wynne (0–1)	Iglesias (12)	40,140	41–37	L2
79	June 26	@ Orioles	3–10	Zimmermann (1–0)	Williamson (1–1)	—	13,077	41–38	L3
80	June 27	@ Orioles	3–1	Abbott (4–0)	Wells (6–4)	Díaz (22)	14,057	42–38	W1
81	June 28	@ Orioles	11–7 (10)	Díaz (3–1)	Akin (2–2)	—	21,152	43–38	W2
82	June 30	Padres	7–5 (11)	Duarte (1–0)	Carlton (2–1)	—	31,772	44–38	W3

July: 15–11 (Home: 6–6; Away: 9–5)

#	Date	Opponent	Score	Win	Loss	Save	Attendance	Record	Streak
83	July 1	Padres	5–12	Wacha (8–2)	Williamson (1–2)	—	30,895	44–39	L1
84	July 2	Padres	4–3	Sims (2–1)	Cosgrove (1–1)	Díaz (23)	37,714	45–39	W1
85	July 3	@ Nationals	3–2	Weaver (2–2)	Irvin (1–5)	Díaz (24)	36,290	46–39	W2
86	July 4	@ Nationals	8–4	Kennedy (1–0)	Corbin (5–10)	Sims (1)	30,434	47–39	W3
87	July 5	@ Nationals	9–2	Ashcraft (4–6)	Gray (6–7)	—	13,252	48–39	W4
88	July 6	@ Nationals	5–4 (10)	Santillan (1–0)	Harvey (3–4)	Díaz (25)	10,064	49–39	W5
89	July 7	@ Brewers	3–7	Burnes (7–5)	Abbott (4–1)	Williams (19)	30,970	49–40	L1
90	July 8	@ Brewers	8–5	Sims (3–1)	Peguero (1–2)	Díaz (26)	39,124	50–40	W1
91	July 9	@ Brewers	0–1	Miley (6–2)	Lively (4–5)	Williams (20)	32,848	50–41	L1
ASG	July 11	NL @ AL	3–2	Doval (1–0)	Bautista (0–1)	Kimbrel (1)	47,159	—	N/A
92	July 14	Brewers	0–1	Burnes (8–5)	Ashcraft (4–7)	Williams (21)	41,516	50–42	L2
93	July 15	Brewers	0–3	Peralta (6–7)	Abbott (4–2)	Williams (22)	39,897	50–43	L3
94	July 16	Brewers	3–4	Milner (1–0)	Sims (3–2)	Williams (23)	30,927	50–44	L4
—	July 17	Giants	Suspended (rain); Resuming: July 18						
95	July 18 (1)	Giants	2–4 (10)	Rogers (3–4)	Gibaut (8–2)	Doval (29)	19,229	50–45	L5
96	July 18 (2)	Giants	10–11	Alexander (6–0)	Farmer (2–4)	Doval (30)	26,569	50–46	L6
97	July 19	Giants	3–2	Ashcraft (5–7)	Stripling (0–3)	Díaz (27)	19,205	51–46	W1
98	July 20	Giants	5–1	Abbott (5–2)	Cobb (6–3)	—	27,829	52–46	W2
99	July 21	Diamondbacks	9–6	Young (4–0)	Henry (5–3)	Díaz (28)	31,824	53–46	W3
100	July 22	Diamondbacks	4–2	Williamson (2–2)	Pfaadt (0–4)	Díaz (29)	40,625	54–46	W4
101	July 23	Diamondbacks	7–3	Law (4–4)	Gilbert (0–1)	Sims (2)	30,811	55–46	W5
102	July 24	@ Brewers	2–3	Williams (5–2)	Díaz (3–2)	—	29,216	55–47	L1
103	July 25	@ Brewers	4–3	Abbott (6–2)	Burnes (9–6)	Díaz (30)	27,551	56–47	W1
104	July 26	@ Brewers	0–3	Peguero (2–3)	Lively (4–6)	Williams (26)	38,596	56–48	L1
105	July 28	@ Dodgers	6–5	Williamson (3–2)	Miller (6–2)	Díaz (31)	48,280	57–48	W1
106	July 29	@ Dodgers	2–3	Kelly (2–5)	Weaver (2–3)	Phillips (13)	51,015	57–49	L1
107	July 30	@ Dodgers	9–0	Ashcraft (6–7)	Grove (2–3)	—	45,936	58–49	W1
108	July 31	@ Cubs	6–5	Farmer (3–4)	Stroman (10–8)	Díaz (32)	34,688	59–49	W2

August: 10–17 (Home: 3–8; Away: 7–9)

#	Date	Opponent	Score	Win	Loss	Save	Attendance	Record	Streak
109	August 1	@ Cubs	9–20	Steele (12–3)	Lively (4–7)	—	33,452	59–50	L1
110	August 2	@ Cubs	6–16	Fulmer (2–5)	Farmer (3–5)	—	33,991	59–51	L2
111	August 3	@ Cubs	3–5	Taillon (6–6)	Weaver (2–4)	Alzolay (13)	35,615	59–52	L3
112	August 4	Nationals	3–6 (10)	Machado (2–0)	Díaz (3–3)	Finnegan (16)	39,284	59–53	L4
113	August 5	Nationals	3–7	Adon (1–0)	Abbott (6–3)	—	41,059	59–54	L5
114	August 6	Nationals	3–6	Machado (3–0)	Richardson (0–1)	Finnegan (17)	26,195	59–55	L6
115	August 7	Marlins	5–2	Williamson (4–2)	Pérez (5–4)	Díaz (33)	17,389	60–55	W1
116	August 8	Marlins	2–3	Garrett (6–3)	Sims (3–3)	Robertson (16)	26,201	60–56	L1
117	August 9	Marlins	4–5	Scott (6–4)	Díaz (3–4)	Robertson (17)	22,352	60–57	L2
118	August 11	@ Pirates	9–2	Abbott (7–3)	Oviedo (6–12)	—	31,523	61–57	W1
—	August 12	@ Pirates	Postponed (rain); Makeup: August 13 as a split doubleheader						
119	August 13 (1)	@ Pirates	2–4	Perdomo (3–2)	Young (4–1)	Bednar (24)	28,731	61–58	L1
120	August 13 (2)	@ Pirates	6–5 (10)	Díaz (4–4)	Bido (2–3)	Duarte (1)	21,545	62–58	W1
121	August 15	Guardians	0–3	Allen (6–5)	Ashcraft (6–8)	Clase (32)	26,290	62–59	L1
122	August 16	Guardians	7–2	Abbott (8–3)	Syndergaard (2–6)	—	19,797	63–59	W1
123	August 18	Blue Jays	1–0	Díaz (5–4)	Hicks (2–8)	—	28,502	64–59	W2
124	August 19	Blue Jays	3–4	Bassitt (12–6)	Williamson (4–3)	Romano (30)	38,461	64–60	L1
125	August 20	Blue Jays	3–10	Ryu (2–1)	Greene (2–5)	Francis (1)	31,529	64–61	L2
—	August 21	@ Angels	Postponed (Effects from Hurricane Hilary); Makeup: August 23 as a split doubleheader						
126	August 22	@ Angels	4–3	Ashcraft (7–8)	Giolito (7–10)	Díaz (34)	26,583	65–61	W1
127	August 23 (1)	@ Angels	9–4	Farmer (4–5)	Anderson (5–5)	—	28,776	66–61	W2
128	August 23 (2)	@ Angels	7–3	Sims (4–3)	Detmers (3–10)	—	24,596	67–61	W3
129	August 24	@ Diamondbacks	2–3	Castro (6–6)	Young (4–2)	Sewald (28)	18,827	67–62	L1
130	August 25	@ Diamondbacks	8–10	Pfaadt (1–6)	Greene (2–6)	Ginkel (4)	29,500	67–63	L2
131	August 26	@ Diamondbacks	8–7 (11)	Díaz (6–4)	Crismatt (0–2)	Sims (3)	34,028	68–63	W1
132	August 27	@ Diamondbacks	2–5	McGough (2–7)	Gibaut (8–3)	Thompson (1)	26,574	68–64	L1
133	August 28	@ Giants	1–4	Harrison (1–0)	Abbott (8–4)	Doval (35)	24,581	68–65	L2
134	August 29	@ Giants	1–6	Cobb (7–5)	Williamson (4–4)	—	26,078	68–66	L3
135	August 30	@ Giants	4–1	Greene (3–6)	Webb (9–11)	Díaz (35)	25,140	69–66	W1

September/October: 13–14 (Home: 7–9; Away: 6–5)

#	Date	Opponent	Score	Win	Loss	Save	Attendance	Record	Streak
136	September 1 (1)	Cubs	2–6	Wicks (2–0)	Ashcraft (7–9)	Thompson (1)	21,480	69–67	L1
137	September 1 (2)	Cubs	3–2	Díaz (7–4)	Alzolay (2–5)	—	27,465	70–67	W1
138	September 2	Cubs	2–1	Moll (1–3)	Leiter Jr. (1–3)	—	38,246	71–67	W2
139	September 3	Cubs	7–15	Palencia (5–0)	Law (4–5)	—	37,029	71–68	L1
140	September 4	Mariners	6–3	Sims (5–3)	Woo (2–4)	Gibaut (2)	20,994	72–68	W1
141	September 5	Mariners	7–6	Díaz (8–4)	Muñoz (3–7)	—	17,863	73–68	W2
142	September 6	Mariners	4–8	Gilbert (13–5)	Richardson (0–2)	—	13,423	73–69	L1
143	September 8	Cardinals	4–9	Liberatore (3–5)	Abbott (8–5)	—	29,870	73–70	L2
144	September 9	Cardinals	3–4	Thompson (5–5)	Moll (1–4)	Helsley (8)	40,810	73–71	L3
145	September 10	Cardinals	7–1	Greene (4–6)	Mikolas (7–11)	—	31,190	74–71	W1
146	September 12	@ Tigers	6–5 (10)	Díaz (9–4)	Lange (6–4)	Farmer (3)	15,080	75–71	W2
147	September 13	@ Tigers	4–3	Duarte (2–0)	Rodríguez (11–8)	Díaz (36)	15,507	76–71	W3
148	September 14	@ Tigers	2–8	Olson (4–7)	Law (4–6)	—	16,945	76–72	L1
149	September 15	@ Mets	5–3	Sims (6–3)	Hartwig (4–2)	Díaz (37)	27,811	77–72	W1
150	September 16	@ Mets	3–2	Duarte (3–0)	Megill (8–8)	Law (2)	32,633	78–72	W2
151	September 17	@ Mets	4–8	Quintana (3–5)	Williamson (4–5)	—	38,044	78–73	L1
152	September 18	Twins	7–3	Phillips (1–0)	Ryan (10–10)	—	15,364	79–73	W1
153	September 19	Twins	0–7	Maeda (6–7)	Cruz (1–2)	—	24,186	79–74	L1
154	September 20	Twins	3–5	Durán (3–6)	Díaz (9–5)	Jax (3)	22,306	79–75	L2
155	September 22	Pirates	5–7	Stratton (1–0)	Gibaut (8–4)	Bednar (37)	37,551	79–76	L3
156	September 23	Pirates	12–13	Hernández (1–1)	Díaz (9–6)	Mlodzinski (1)	29,680	79–77	L4
157	September 24	Pirates	4–2	Sims (7–3)	Hernández (1–2)	Gibaut (3)	31,191	80–77	W1
158	September 26	@ Guardians	11–7	Moll (2–3)	Karinchak (2–5)	Díaz (38)	29,189	81–77	W2
159	September 27	@ Guardians	3–4	Bieber (6–6)	Abbott (8–6)	Clase (43)	28,915	81–78	L1
160	September 29	@ Cardinals	19–2	Williamson (5–5)	Woodford (2–3)	Spiers (1)	38,964	82–78	W1
161	September 30	@ Cardinals	6–15	VerHagen (5–1)	Phillips (1–1)	—	39,923	82–79	L1
162	October 1	@ Cardinals	3–4	Mikolas (9–13)	Greene (4–7)	Helsley (14)	44,614	82–80	L2

== Standings ==
=== National League Central ===
NL Central
Team	W	L	Pct.	GB	Home	Road
Milwaukee Brewers	92	70	.568	—	49‍–‍32	43‍–‍38
Chicago Cubs	83	79	.512	9	45‍–‍36	38‍–‍43
Cincinnati Reds	82	80	.506	10	38‍–‍43	44‍–‍37
Pittsburgh Pirates	76	86	.469	16	39‍–‍42	37‍–‍44
St. Louis Cardinals	71	91	.438	21	35‍–‍46	36‍–‍45

=== National League Wild Card ===
Division leaders
Team	W	L	Pct.
Atlanta Braves	104	58	.642
Los Angeles Dodgers	100	62	.617
Milwaukee Brewers	92	70	.568

Wild Card teams (Top 3 teams qualify for postseason)
Team	W	L	Pct.	GB
Philadelphia Phillies	90	72	.556	+6
Miami Marlins	84	78	.519	—
Arizona Diamondbacks	84	78	.519	—
Chicago Cubs	83	79	.512	1
San Diego Padres	82	80	.506	2
Cincinnati Reds	82	80	.506	2
San Francisco Giants	79	83	.488	5
Pittsburgh Pirates	76	86	.469	8
New York Mets	75	87	.463	9
St. Louis Cardinals	71	91	.438	13
Washington Nationals	71	91	.438	13
Colorado Rockies	59	103	.364	25

=== Record vs. opponents ===
==== Record vs. National League ====
2023 National League record Source: MLB Standings Grid – 2023
Team	AZ	ATL	CHC	CIN	COL	LAD	MIA	MIL	NYM	PHI	PIT	SD	SF	STL	WSH	AL
Arizona	—	3–3	6–1	3–4	10–3	5–8	2–4	4–2	1–6	3–4	4–2	7–6	7–6	3–3	5–1	21–25
Atlanta	3–3	—	4–2	5–1	7–0	4–3	9–4	5–1	10–3	8–5	4–3	3–4	4–2	4–2	8–5	26–20
Chicago	1–6	2–4	—	6–7	4–2	3–4	2–4	6–7	3–3	1–5	10–3	4–3	5–1	8–5	3–4	25–21
Cincinnati	4–3	1–5	7–6	—	4–2	4–2	3–3	3–10	4–2	3–4	5–8	3–3	3–4	6–7	4–3	28–18
Colorado	3–10	0–7	2–4	2–4	—	3–10	5–2	4–2	4–2	2–5	2–4	4–9	4–9	3–3	3–4	18–28
Los Angeles	8–5	3–4	4–3	2–4	10–3	—	3–3	5–1	3–3	4–2	4–3	9–4	7–6	4–3	4–2	30–16
Miami	4–2	4–9	4–2	3–3	2–5	3–3	—	3–4	4–8	7–6	5–2	2–4	3–3	3–4	11–2	26–20
Milwaukee	2–4	1–5	7–6	10–3	2–4	1–5	4–3	—	6–1	4–2	8–5	6–1	2–5	8–5	3–3	28–18
New York	6–1	3–10	3–3	2–4	2–4	3–3	8–4	1–6	—	6–7	3–3	3–3	4–3	4–3	7–6	19–27
Philadelphia	4–3	5–8	5–1	4–3	5–2	2–4	6–7	2–4	7–6	—	3–3	5–2	2–4	5–1	7–6	28–18
Pittsburgh	2–4	3–4	3–10	8–5	4–2	3–4	2–5	5–8	3–3	3–3	—	5–1	2–4	9–4	5–2	19–27
San Diego	6–7	4–3	3–4	3–3	9–4	4–9	4–2	1–6	3–3	2–5	1–5	—	8–5	3–3	3–3	28–18
San Francisco	6–7	2–4	1–5	4–3	9–4	6–7	3–3	5–2	3–4	4–2	4–2	5–8	—	6–1	1–5	20–26
St. Louis	3–3	2–4	5–8	7–6	3–3	3–4	4–3	5–8	3–4	1–5	4–9	3–3	1–6	—	4–2	23–23
Washington	1–5	5–8	4–3	3–4	4–3	2–4	2–11	3–3	6–7	6–7	2–5	3–3	5–1	2–4	—	23–23

Updated with the results of all games through October 1, 2023.

==== Record vs. American League ====
2023 National League record vs. American League Source: MLB Standings
Team	BAL	BOS	CWS	CLE	DET	HOU	KC	LAA	MIN	NYY	OAK	SEA	TB	TEX	TOR
Arizona	1–2	1–2	2–1	2–1	3–0	0–3	2–1	2–1	0–3	1–2	2–1	1–2	1–2	3–1	0–3
Atlanta	2–1	1–3	1–2	2–1	2–1	0–3	3–0	2–1	3–0	3–0	1–2	2–1	2–1	2–1	0–3
Chicago	2–1	1–2	3–1	1–2	2–1	0–3	2–1	0–3	1–2	2–1	3–0	2–1	2–1	2–1	2–1
Cincinnati	2–1	2–1	1–2	2–2	2–1	3–0	3–0	3–0	1–2	0–3	2–1	2–1	1–2	3–0	1–2
Colorado	1–2	2–1	2–1	2–1	1–2	1–3	2–1	2–1	1–2	2–1	1–2	0–3	0–3	0–3	1–2
Los Angeles	2–1	2–1	2–1	2–1	2–1	2–1	1–2	4–0	2–1	1–2	3–0	3–0	1–2	2–1	1–2
Miami	0–3	3–0	2–1	2–1	2–1	1–2	3–0	3–0	2–1	2–1	3–0	1–2	1–3	0–3	1–2
Milwaukee	2–1	1–2	3–0	2–1	1–2	2–1	3–0	2–1	2–2	2–1	0–3	3–0	1–2	3–0	1–2
New York	0–3	1–2	2–1	3–0	0–3	1–2	0–3	1–2	1–2	2–2	3–0	2–1	2–1	1–2	0–3
Philadelphia	2–1	1–2	2–1	1–2	3–0	2–1	2–1	2–1	1–2	1–2	3–0	2–1	3–0	0–3	3–1
Pittsburgh	1–2	3–0	2–1	1–2	2–2	1–2	3–0	1–2	1–2	1–2	1–2	1–2	0–3	1–2	0–3
San Diego	2–1	1–2	3–0	2–1	2–1	1–2	1–2	3–0	1–2	1–2	3–0	1–3	2–1	3–0	2–1
San Francisco	1–2	2–1	2–1	2–1	0–3	2–1	1–2	1–2	2–1	1–2	2–2	1–2	1–2	1–2	1–2
St. Louis	2–1	3–0	2–1	1–2	1–2	1–2	2–2	0–3	1–2	2–1	2–1	1–2	2–1	1–2	2–1
Washington	0–4	2–1	2–1	1–2	2–1	1–2	2–1	1–2	2–1	2–1	3–0	2–1	0–3	2–1	1–2

Updated with the results of all games through October 1, 2023.

=== Opening Day starters ===
Thursday, March 30, 2023 vs. Pittsburgh Pirates at Great American Ball Park.

Name	Pos.
Jonathan India	2B
TJ Friedl	CF
Jake Fraley	DH
Tyler Stephenson	C
Jason Vosler	1B
Wil Myers	RF
Spencer Steer	3B
Will Benson	LF
José Barrero	SS
Hunter Greene	P

=== Season summary ===
==== March/April ====
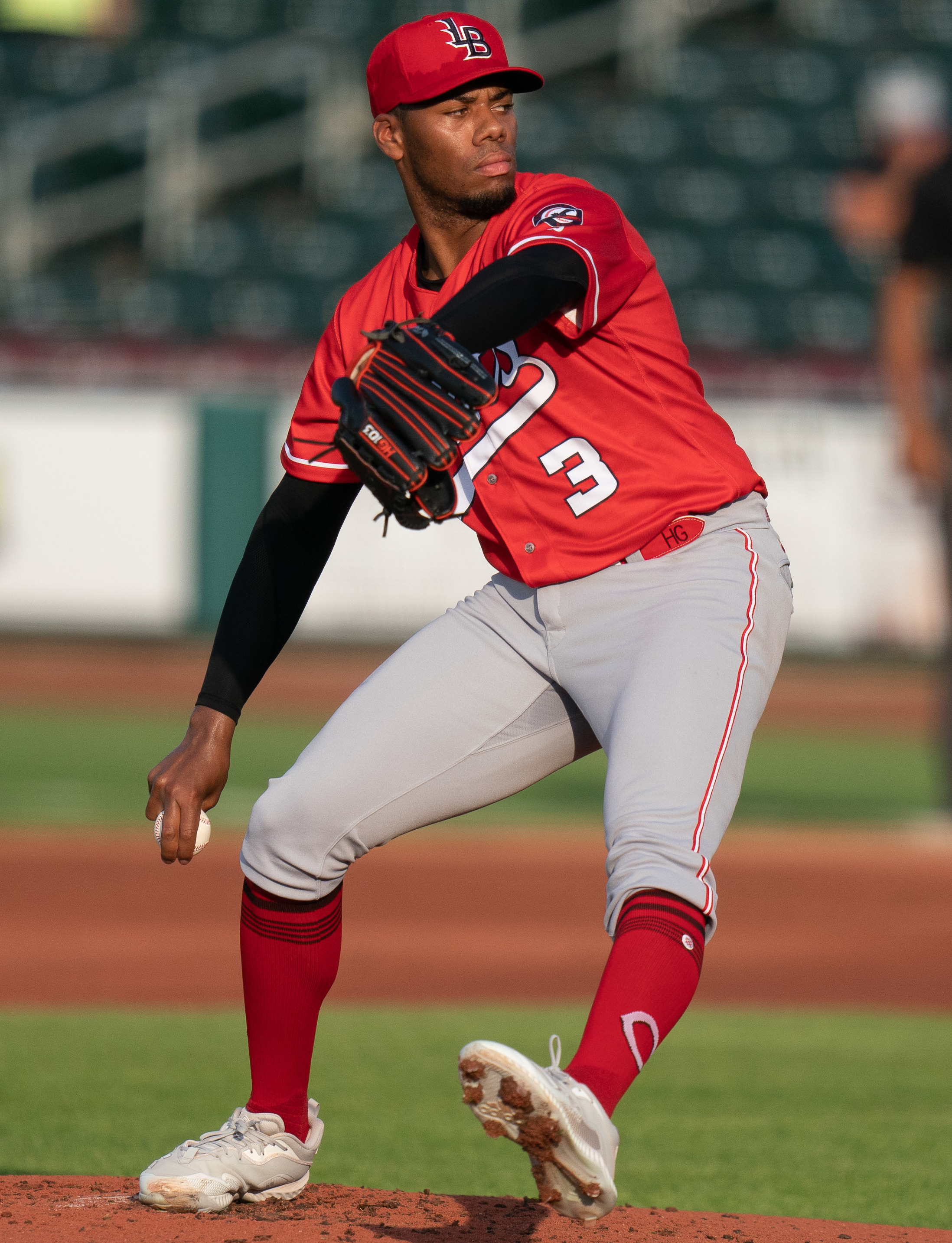
Hunter Greene, seen here with the Louisville Bats in 2021 was the Reds Opening Day starting pitcher.

- March 9 – The Reds announced that Hunter Greene will be the Opening Day starting pitcher.
- March 30 – In the first game of the season, the Reds faced the Pittsburgh Pirates at Great American Ball Park. After falling behind 4–1, Spencer Steer hit a home run in the 4th inning, while Jason Vosler hit a two-run triple in the 5th, tying the game 4–4. The Pirates Oneil Cruz broke the tie with a sacrifice fly in the 8th, as Cincinnati dropped the game 5–4 in front of a crowd of 44,063.
- April 1 – After a scheduled day off, the Reds resumed their three-game series with the Pirates. Jonathan India, Kevin Newman and Jake Fraley each hit home runs. Nick Lodolo earned his first win of the season, striking out nine batters in five innings, as the Reds defeated the Pirates 6–2.
- April 2 – Graham Ashcraft pitched seven innings, allowing only one run and while striking out six. Jason Vosler and TJ Friedl each hit a home run, while Alexis Díaz earned his first save of the season, as Cincinnati beat the Pirates 3–1.
- April 3 – The Reds began a three-game series at home with the Chicago Cubs. Kevin Newman drove in two, and Jason Vosler hit a three-run home run in the fifth, leading the Reds to a 7–6 win. Derek Law earned his first save with Cincinnati.
- April 4 – Despite getting home runs from Jason Vosler, TJ Friedl and Stuart Fairchild, the Reds three game winning streak is snapped, as the Cubs defeated Cincinnati 12–5. Chicago overcame a 3–1 deficit, scoring six runs in the 7th and adding three more in the eighth, leading them to the win.
- April 5 – The final game of the three-game series against the Cubs was postponed due to rain. The game was rescheduled as part of a split doubleheader on September 1 at 1:10 pm.
- April 6 – The Reds first road game of the season at Citizens Bank Park in Philadelphia, Pennsylvania was postponed by rain. The game against the Philadelphia Phillies was rescheduled to the next day, April 7, at 3:05 pm.
- April 7 – Cincinnati opened their first road series of the season, a three-game set against the Phillies. Tyler Stephenson hit an RBI double in the sixth inning, tying the game 2–2. The Phillies J. T. Realmuto hit the go-ahead two-run home run in the seventh off of Derek Law as Philadelphia won the game 5–2.
- April 8 – Nick Lodolo pitched seven shutout innings, striking out 12 batters. Spencer Steer hit a home run in the first inning and Jake Fraley hit a sacrifice fly in the ninth, giving the Reds a 2–0 lead. In the bottom of the ninth, the Phillies rallied for three runs to win the game 3–2.
- April 9 – With the Phillies leading the game 4–3 in the top of the ninth inning, Jake Fraley hit a three-run double, leading the Reds to a 6–4 victory. Kevin Herget earned his first career win and Ian Gibaut earned his first save of the season. The win was the Reds first road win of the 2023 season.
- April 10 – Cincinnati began a three-game road series at Truist Park in Atlanta, Georgia. Down 3–1 in the ninth inning, Stuart Fairchild hit a pinch-hit triple, cutting the lead to 3–2. Spencer Steer then hit a single, scoring Fairchild to tie the game. In the tenth inning, Jonathan India singled, scoring José Barrero to give Cincinnati a 4–3 lead. In the bottom of the inning, the Braves Sean Murphy hit a two-run home run, as Atlanta won the game 5–4.
- April 11 – Spencer Steer had three hits and drove in two runners and José Barrero hit an eighth inning two-run home run. Luis Cessa struggled in his start, allowing five runs in 3.2 innings, as the Reds lost another close game to Atlanta by a score of 7–6.
- April 12 – The Braves completed the three-game sweep over the Reds, as Cincinnati lost the game 5–4. Hunter Greene had a strong start, allowing three runs, striking out 10 and allowing no walks. TJ Friedl had three hits and an RBI and Tyler Stephenson drove in two runs. With the loss, the Reds finished their first road trip of the season with a 1–5 record.
- April 13 – The Reds returned home and began a four-game series against the Philadelphia Phillies. Wil Myers had two hits and drove in two runs to lead the Reds offense. Nick Lodolo earned his second win of the season, allowing two runs in five innings, and the bullpen pitched three scoreless innings as Cincinnati snapped their three-game losing streak with a 6–2 win.
- April 14 – Connor Overton struggled in his start, as he allowed five runs and walked three in three innings pitched. Jonathan India drove home two runs, but the Phillies defeated Cincinnati 8–3.
- April 15 – Wil Myers had four hits, including two home runs and a double, while driving home five runners to lead the Reds offense. Graham Ashcraft pitched six shutout innings, improving his record to 2–0 and dropping his ERA to 1.42, as Cincinnati shutout the Phillies 13–0.
- April 16 – The Phillies scored nine runs in the first inning, as they cruised to a 14–3 win over the Reds. Luis Cessa struggled in his start, allowing 14 hits and 11 runs in three innings, while walking three batters. Spencer Steer, Nick Senzel and Luke Maile each had two hits for Cincinnati.
- April 17 – The Reds hosted the Tampa Bay Rays for their first interleague series of the season. The Rays came into the series with a league-best record of 14–2. TJ Friedl drove in four runs and Kevin Newman hit a home run and drove home two, as Cincinnati defeated the Rays 8–1. Hunter Greene left the game after pitching three innings due to a leg injury.
- April 18 – Cincinnati was limited to only four hits and Nick Lodolo struggled in his start, allowing eight runs in 4.2 innings, as Tampa Bay shutout the Reds 10–0. Curt Casali had two hits for Cincinnati in the loss.
- April 19 – Levi Stoudt struggled in his major league debut, allowing six runs in the first inning. Over four innings, Stoudt allowed seven runs and struck out three. Offensively, the Rays shut the Reds down, limited them to five hits as Tampa Bay shutout Cincinnati for the second consecutive game, as the final score was 8–0.
- April 20 – Cincinnati was back on the road as they played against the Pittsburgh Pirates at PNC Park in Pittsburgh, Pennsylvania for a four-game series. Luke Weaver made his Reds debut, and after a shaky first inning in which he allowed four runs, Weaver settled down and pitched six innings, not allowing another run after the first, and struck out eight batters. Jonathan India had three hits, raising his average to .318. The Reds comeback came up a little short, as they dropped the series opener by a 4–3 score.
- April 21 – The Reds offensive woes continued, as Cincinnati managed only five singles in a 4–2 loss to the Pirates. Graham Ashcraft had a good start, pitching five innings, in which he allowed two runs and struck out four. The loss extended the Reds losing skid to four games.
- April 22 – Cincinnati continued to struggle on offense, scoring only one run in a 2–1 loss to Pittsburgh. The loss was the Reds fifth in a row, and dropped their record to 4–13 in their last 17 games.
- April 23 – Hunter Greene pitched six innings, allowing only one run and struck out six batters. Despite his strong start, the Reds were shutout for the third time in their past six games as they lost 2–0 to the Pirates, who completed the four-game series sweep. The loss dropped the Reds road record to 1–9.
- April 24 – Following their four-game road trip to Pittsburgh, the Reds returned home for a three-game interleague series against the Texas Rangers. With the game tied 6–6 in the bottom of the ninth, TJ Friedl had the game-winning hit, singling home Jonathan India, as the Reds snapped their six game losing skid with a 7–6 win. Spencer Steer had two hits, including a two-run triple in the third inning.
- April 25 – The Reds came back from a 6–0 deficit in the sixth inning to defeat the Rangers 7–6. Jonathan India hit the go-ahead single in the eighth inning, scoring José Barrero and Jake Fraley, as the Reds scored five runs in the inning to take the lead. Nick Senzel had three hits and drove in two runners as Cincinnati won their second consecutive game over Texas.
- April 26 – Nick Senzel hit a walk off two-run home run, leading the Reds to a 5–3 victory over the Rangers, completing the three-game series sweep. Graham Ashcraft pitched six innings, allowing only two runs. With the win, Cincinnati improved to 9–6 at home.
- April 28 – After a day off, the Reds opened a three-game road interleague series against the Oakland Athletics at Oakland Coliseum in Oakland, California. Cincinnati's offense pounded out 16 hits, as eight different Reds players had two-hit games. Jake Fraley hit a home run and Henry Ramos reached base four times, as Cincinnati won their fourth game in a row, defeating the Athletics 11–7.
- April 29 – Hunter Greene struck out 10 batters, tying a season-high, in five innings pitched. Down 2–1 in the top of the ninth, Jake Fraley hit a two-run double, leading the Reds to a 3–2 win. The victory extended Cincinnati's win streak to five games. Overall, Reds pitchers struck out 17 Oakland batters.
- April 30 – Nick Senzel had two hits, including a home run, while Kevin Newman also recorded two hits, and drove home two runs. Nick Lodolo struck out seven batters and allowed three runs in five innings pitched. The Reds were unable to hold a 4–3 lead, as Oakland scored in the eighth, followed by a run in the ninth, snapping the Reds winning streak at five games, as the final score was 5–4 for the A's.

==== May ====
- May 1 – The Reds wrapped up their six-game road trip with a three-game series at Petco Park in San Diego, California. Nick Senzel had three hits, including a home run, while Stuart Fairchild hit a two-run double, however, the Reds dropped the series opener to the Padres, losing 8–3.
- May 2 – Graham Ashcraft pitched six innings, allowing only one run to drop his season ERA to 2.00. With the game tied 1–1 in the top of the 10th inning, Jonathan India singled home Matt Reynolds to give the Reds a 2–1 lead. Alexis Díaz shut the door in the bottom half of the inning, earning his fifth save of the year, as Cincinnati held on for the win.
- May 3 – Spencer Steer provided all of the Reds offense, as he hit a solo home run in the top of the sixth inning, as Cincinnati dropped the series finale to the Padres by a 7–1 score. Luis Cessa struggled in his start, pitching 3.1 innings and allowing three runs. With the loss, the Reds finished their six game road trip with a 3–3 record.
- May 5 – The Reds returned to Great American Ballpark for a three-game interleague series against the Chicago White Sox. Jonathan India hit his second home run of the season. Hunter Greene struggled, allowing five runs in 5.2 innings, but we walked none and struck out seven. The White Sox took the first game of the series, defeating Cincinnati 5–4.
- May 6 – Jonathan India had three hits and scored three runs and TJ Friedl had two hits, driving home four runners, including hitting a three-run home run, as the Reds defeated the White Sox 5–3. The Reds bullpen threw 5.1 shutout innings.
- May 7 – The Reds slugged four home runs, as Jonathan India, Spencer Steer, Tyler Stephenson and Wil Myers each hit one. Graham Ashcraft struggled, allowing eight runs in 1.2 innings pitched, as Chicago scored 11 runs in the second inning. The White Sox took the final game of the series, defeating Cincinnati 17–4.
- May 9 – After a day off, the Reds welcomed the New York Mets for a three-game series. TJ Friedl had two hits and scored two runs and Jonathan India drove home three runners, as the Reds opened the series with a 7–6 win over the Mets. Luke Weaver earned his first win as a member of the Reds, as he allowed four runs in six innings pitched.
- May 10 – The Mets held the Reds offense to two hits and one run. Hunter Greene allowed two runs in 5.1 innings pitched, as he took the loss by a 2–1 score to drop to 0–3 on the season.
- May 11 – The Reds shutout the Mets 5–0 to win the deciding game of the series. Kevin Newman drove home two runners and Spencer Steer hit a solo home run to lead Cincinnati's offense. Jonathan India, Jake Fraley and Tyler Stephenson each had two hits. Ben Lively earned his first win with the Reds, pitching three shutout innings and Kevin Herget earned his first career save.
- May 12 – Cincinnati began a six-game road trip. Their first three games were played against the Miami Marlins at LoanDepot Park in Miami, Florida. In the series opener, with the game tied 4–4, Jake Fraley hit a three-run home run in the top of the ninth inning, leading the Reds to a 7–4 win. It was the second home run of the game from Fraley, who also connected for a homer in the fifth inning.
- May 13 – Jake Fraley had two hits, including his third home run in the last two games, and drove home four runners, as the Reds defeated Miami 6–5. Ian Gibaut earned his second win in two days, improving to 3–0 on the season.
- May 14 – On Mother's Day, the Marlins held Cincinnati to five hits, as Miami avoided the series sweep, beating the Reds 3–1. Nick Senzel and Kevin Newman each had two hits in the loss. Luke Weaver pitched 5.1 innings, allowing only one run and striking out six batters.
- May 15 – The Reds opened a three-game series against the Colorado Rockies at Coors Field in Denver, Colorado. Spencer Steer had three hits, scored a run and drove home a run. In his major league debut, Matt McLain hit a double and scored two runs. Hunter Greene struggled, allowing six runs in four innings. Former Red Mike Moustakas hit a home run for the Rockies, as Cincinnati dropped the series opener by a 9–8 score.
- May 16 – In his major league debut, Brandon Williamson pitched 5.2 innings, striking out six batters and allowing only one run. Down 1–0 in the seventh, Nick Senzel hit a two-run home run, as the Reds rallied for a 3–1 victory over the Rockies. Alexis Díaz earned his 10th save of the season in the win.
- May 17 – Stuart Fairchild had two hits and drove home three runs and Luke Maile hit a two-run home run, however, the Reds dropped the final game of the series, losing 11–6 to the Rockies. Cincinnati held a 5–0 lead until allowing five runs in the fifth inning and six runs in the sixth.
- May 19 – Following an off day, the Reds returned home for a three game weekend interleague series against the New York Yankees. In the sixth inning, Jake Fraley hit a two-run double, scoring Jonathan India and Matt McLain, however, that was all the runs the Reds could score, as they lost the series opener 6–2. Ben Lively pitched 5.2 innings, striking out eight batters and allowed two runs.
- May 20 – The Reds dropped their third straight game, losing 7–4 to the Yankees in 10 innings. Luke Maile hit his third home run of the season, a two-run homer in the third inning. The Yankees Anthony Rizzo hit a three-run home run in the 10th.
- May 21 – The Yankees completed the three-game sweep of the Reds, as Cincinnati dropped the final game of the series 4–1. The Reds scored their lone run in the first inning, as Spencer Steer doubled home Jonathan India to give Cincinnati a 1–0 lead. Hunter Greene pitched seven innings, striking out 10 batters, while allowing four runs.
- May 22 – Cincinnati opens a four-game home series against their divisional rivals, the St. Louis Cardinals. Nick Senzel hit a game-winning sacrifice fly in the tenth inning, scoring Spencer Steer, as the Reds snapped their four-game losing streak with a 6–5 win over the Cardinals. Ian Gibaut earned his team leading fourth win of the season.
- May 23 – Matt McLain hit his first career home run, a two-run shot, however, the Reds lost to the Cardinals 8–5. TJ Friedl had two hits and scored a run in his first game since coming off the injured list. Graham Ashcraft struggled, allowing seven runs in five innings, as his record dropped to 2–3 and ERA rose to 5.57 on the season.
- May 24 – Spencer Steer had four hits and drove in two runs, leading the Reds to a 10–3 victory. Kevin Newman had two hits and drove home three and Matt McLain hit his second home run in two games. Ben Lively pitched six innings, allowed two runs and struck out eight to earn his first win as a starting pitcher since 2017.
- May 25 – In the series finale, Luke Weaver pitched 6.1 shutout innings, allowing only three hits and striking out six, however, he left the game when it was still scoreless. The Cardinals scored two in the eighth, then the Reds ninth inning rally fell a little short, as Stuart Fairchild singled home Spencer Steer to cut the lead to 2–1, but St. Louis shut the door, and took the win to split the series.
- May 26 – The Reds are on the road for a three-game weekend series against their divisional rivals, the Chicago Cubs, at Wrigley Field in Chicago, Illinois. Hunter Greene pitched six innings of no-hit baseball, striking out 11 batters, leading the Reds to a 9–0 win over the Cubs as he earned his first victory of the season. The Reds offense pounded out 19 hits, including three hit games from Matt McLain, Spencer Steer, Tyler Stephenson and Stuart Fairchild.
- May 27 – Jonathan India had three hits, including two home runs and drove home five runners, as the Reds defeated the Cubs 8–5. TJ Friedl, Matt McLain and Tyler Stephenson each had two hits. Alexis Díaz earned his 11th save of the season.
- May 28 – Matt McLain had four hits, pushing his season batting average up to .380, and Spencer Steer hit a two-run home run, as they led the Reds to a three-game series sweep, as Cincinnati defeated the Cubs 8–5. With the win, the Reds improved to 24–29, moving to third place in the division, four games behind the division leading Milwaukee Brewers.
- May 30 – Following a scheduled day off, the Reds travelled to Boston, Massachusetts for three-game interleague series against the Boston Red Sox at Fenway Park. José Barrero hit a grand slam in the seventh inning, giving the Reds a lead of 8–0. Despite a Red Sox rally, the Reds held on for the win, defeating Boston 9–8, to win their fourth consecutive game. Will Benson had three hits and three runs.
- May 31 – Spencer Steer hit a tie-breaking two-run home run in the seventh inning, leading the Reds to a 5–4 victory for their fifth win in a row. Kevin Newman, Matt McLain and Nick Senzel each recorded two hits. Ian Gibaut earned the victory, his team-leading fifth of the season.

==== June ====
- June 1 – The Red Sox broke a 2–2 tie in the eighth inning, scoring six runs, to snap the Reds five game winning streak, as Boston won the final game of the series 8–2. Hunter Greene had an excellent start, allowing only two hits and one run, while striking out eight batters, in six innings. Kevin Newman had three hits, scored a run and drove home a runner.
- June 2 – The Reds returned home for a four-game series against the division leading Milwaukee Brewers. Brandon Williamson pitched 6.2 innings, allowing three runs, two earned, while striking out six. The Reds were held to three hits in the game, and dropped the opener by a 5–4 score in 11 innings. The announced crowd of 44,073 was the biggest in the history of Great American Ballpark.
- June 3 – Cincinnati lost their third game in a row, as their rally came up short in a 10–8 loss to the Brewers. Jake Fraley had three hits, including a solo home run. Jonathan India drove home three runners and stole two bases while Spencer Steer had two hits, walked twice, drove home two runners and stole two bases.
- June 4 – Jake Fraley hit a solo home run in the seventh inning, which accounted for all of the Reds offense, as Cincinnati lost their fourth game in a row, dropping a 5–1 decision. Matt McLain had two hits, improving his batting average to .342 on the season.
- June 5 – In his Major League debut, Andrew Abbott allowed only one hit and struck out six batters in six innings, as the Reds shutout the Brewers 2–0. Tyler Stephenson and Spencer Steer each hit solo home runs and Alexis Díaz struck out the side in the ninth inning to record his 14th save of the season.
- June 6 – The Reds welcomed the Los Angeles Dodgers for a three-game series at home. In the bottom of the ninth, Matt McLain singled home Stuart Fairchild, as Cincinnati rallied for a 9–8 win. In his MLB debut, Elly De La Cruz hit a double, walked twice and scored a run. Tyler Stephenson had three hits and drove home two runs.
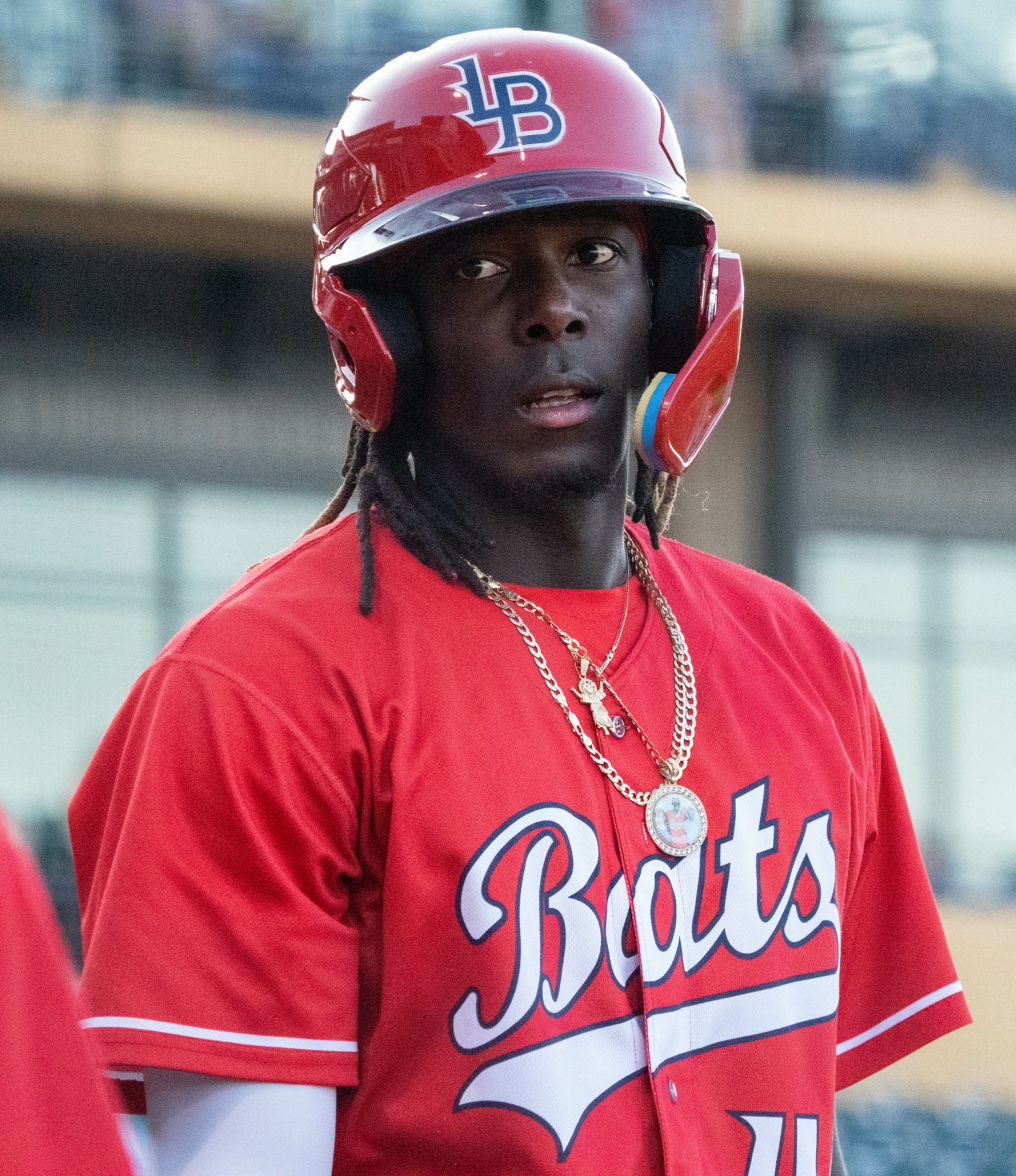
  Elly De La Cruz, seen here with the Louisville Bats in May 2023, made his Major League debut on June 6, 2023.
- June 7 – Will Benson hit a walk-off two-run home run in the bottom of the ninth inning for his first career home run, breaking a 6–6 tie, as the Reds extended their winning streak to three games with a 8–6 victory over Los Angeles. Elly De La Cruz had two hits, including his first career home run, and drove home two runs.
- June 8 – Cincinnati was held to six hits, as the Dodgers won the final game of the series by a 6–0 score. Matt McLain had two of the Reds hits, including a double. Elly De La Cruz had a single and stole his first career base.
- June 9 – The Reds are on the road for a weekend series against their divisional rivals, the St. Louis Cardinals, at Busch Stadium in St. Louis, Missouri. Stuart Fairchild had two hits and drove home two runs, as Cincinnati lost the series opener 7–4.
- June 10 – Jonathan India scored three runs, leading Cincinnati to a 8–4 victory over the Cardinals. Andrew Abbott pitched 5.2 shutout innings to earn his second win of the season. He has not allowed a run in his first 11.2 MLB innings pitched. Spencer Steer drove home three runs and Tyler Stephenson had two hits, scored a run and drove in a run.
- June 11 – Elly De La Cruz had two hits, walked twice, stole a base and scored two runs, as the Reds won the game 4–3. Jonathan India hit a home run, his seventh of the season. Will Benson collected three hits. Alexis Díaz earned his 15th save of the season.
- June 12 – The Reds continued their road trip with a three-game interleague series against the Kansas City Royals at Kauffman Stadium in Kansas City, Missouri. Jonathan India had two hits and drove home two runs, including the game-winning run in the 10th inning, as the Reds defeated the Royals 5–4.
- June 13 – Brandon Williamson earned his first career victory, pitching five innings and allowing three runs, as Cincinnati won their fourth game in a row, defeating the Royals 5–4. TJ Friedl had two hits and scored a run and stole a base and drove in a run to lead the Reds offense.
- June 14 – Cincinnati slugged four home runs, defeating the Royals 7–4 to complete a three-game series sweep. Spencer Steer, Stuart Fairchild, Matt McLain and Jonathan India each hit home runs, with McLain leading the way with a three-run homer. With the victory, the Reds extended their overall winning streak to five games.
- June 16 – The Reds concluded their road trip with a three-game interleague series at Minute Maid Park in Houston, Texas to face the Houston Astros. Cincinnati remained hot, winning their sixth game in a row, defeating the Astros 2–1. Andrew Abbott extended his scoreless inning streak to 17.2 to begin his career, as he pitched six shutout innings and improved to 3–0 on the season. In the seventh inning, Tyler Stephenson hit a solo home run and Kevin Newman doubled home Will Benson to lead the Reds offense. With the win, Cincinnati improved to 35–35 on the season.
- June 17 – Will Benson had three hits and drove home two runs, leading the Reds offense in a 10–3 victory over the Astros. Jonathan India hit his ninth home run of the season in the first inning and Matt McLain, Elly De La Cruz, Spencer Steer and Tyler Stephenson each had two hits. Hunter Greene pitched six innings, allowing only two runs to earn his second win of the season.
- June 18 – Cincinnati extended their winning streak to eight games, as the Reds defeated Houston 9–7 in 10 innings. Jonathan India, Spencer Steer and Jake Fraley each connected for a home run. Cincinnati improved to 37–35 on the season and sit just a half game behind the Milwaukee Brewers for first place in the NL Central.
- June 19 – The Reds returned home for a three-game series against the Colorado Rockies. In the series opener, Joey Votto hit a home run and drove home three runners in his first game of the season, as the Reds moved into first place in the division with a 5–4 win over the Rockies.
- June 20 – TJ Friedl had four hits, including a three-run home run, as Cincinnati extended their winning streak to 10 games, defeating the Rockies 8–6. Elly De La Cruz also hit a home run, as he recorded three hits and scored twice.
- June 21 – Jake Fraley hit a two-run home run in the eighth inning, snapping a 3–3 tie, as the Reds won their 11th game in a row, defeating Colorado 5–3. Andrew Abbott had a very strong start, pitching six innings and striking out 10 batters. With the win, the Reds winning streak is now their longest since winning 12 in a row during the 1957 season.
- June 23 – Following an off-day, the Reds faced the Atlanta Braves for a three-game home series. In his 15th career game, Elly De La Cruz hit for the cycle and drove home four runs. Joey Votto hit two home runs and drove home four, while Jake Fraley hit a two-run home run, as the Reds rallied from a 5–0 deficit to defeat the Braves 11–10. With the win, the Reds winning streak extended to 12 games.
- June 24 – The Reds winning streak was snapped at 12 games, as Atlanta held off Cincinnati and won the game 7–6. Matt McLain had two hits, including a two-run home run in the third inning. Spencer Steer also hit a two-run homer and in the ninth inning, both Jake Fraley and Will Benson hit solo home runs, as the Reds rally came up short.
- June 25 – Matt McLain had four extra-base hits, as he hit three doubles and a home run, driving home five runners, however, Cincinnati dropped their second consecutive game, losing 7–6 to the Braves.
- June 26 – Cincinnati was on the road for to begin a three-game interleague series against the Baltimore Orioles at Oriole Park at Camden Yards in Baltimore, Maryland. In a game interrupted with a 1 hour, 44 minute rain delay, Spencer Steer had three hits, including a home run, and drove home all three Reds runs in a 10–3 loss to the Orioles. With the loss, the Reds fell into second place in the NL Central, half a game behind the Milwaukee Brewers.
- June 27 – Andrew Abbott pitched six innings, allowing only two hits and a run, while striking out eight, as he improved to 4–0 on the season, leading the Reds to a 3–1 victory. Matt McLain and TJ Friedl each hit home runs. With the win, the Reds moved back into first place in the division.
- June 28 – TJ Friedl hit a two-run home run in the 10th inning, as the Reds held off the Orioles 11–7 to win the three-game series. Friedl had three hits, three runs, drove home three runners and stole two bases, while Will Benson also recorded three hits and scored three runs. At the half-way mark of the season, the Reds are in first place in the division with a 43–38 record.
- June 30 – The Reds returned home for their final home series before the All-Star break, as they hosted the San Diego Padres for a three-game series. In the first game, Spencer Steer hit a tie-breaking home run in the 11th inning, leading the Reds to a 7–5 victory. Tyler Stephenson and Matt McLain each hit home runs. Graham Ashcraft had a very solid start, pitching 6.2 innings and allowing only three hits and one run.

==== July ====
- July 1 – Jonathan India hit a grand slam, the second of his career, however, the Reds opened the month of July with a loss, as the Padres won the game 12–5. Will Benson had three hits and scored a run and Matt McLain hit two doubles.
- July 2 – Spencer Steer and Tyler Stephenson each hit two-run home runs, leading the Reds to a 4–3 victory over the Padres. Andrew Abbott pitched 7.2 innings, allowing only one run and struck out 12 batters.
- July 3 – The Reds opened a four-game road series at Nationals Park in Washington, District of Columbia. Joey Votto hit a two-run home run in the fourth inning, leading Cincinnati to a 3–2 victory. Luke Weaver pitched five innings, allowing two runs and earned his second win of the season. Reds closer Alexis Díaz picked up his 24th save of the season.
- July 4 – In an Independence Day matchup in Washington, Jonathan India hit two homeruns, leading the Reds to their third consecutive win, defeating the Nationals 8–4. Elly De La Cruz and Spencer Steer each recorded four hits. In his first MLB game in 2018, and in his Reds debut, Brett Kennedy pitched five innings and earned the victory.
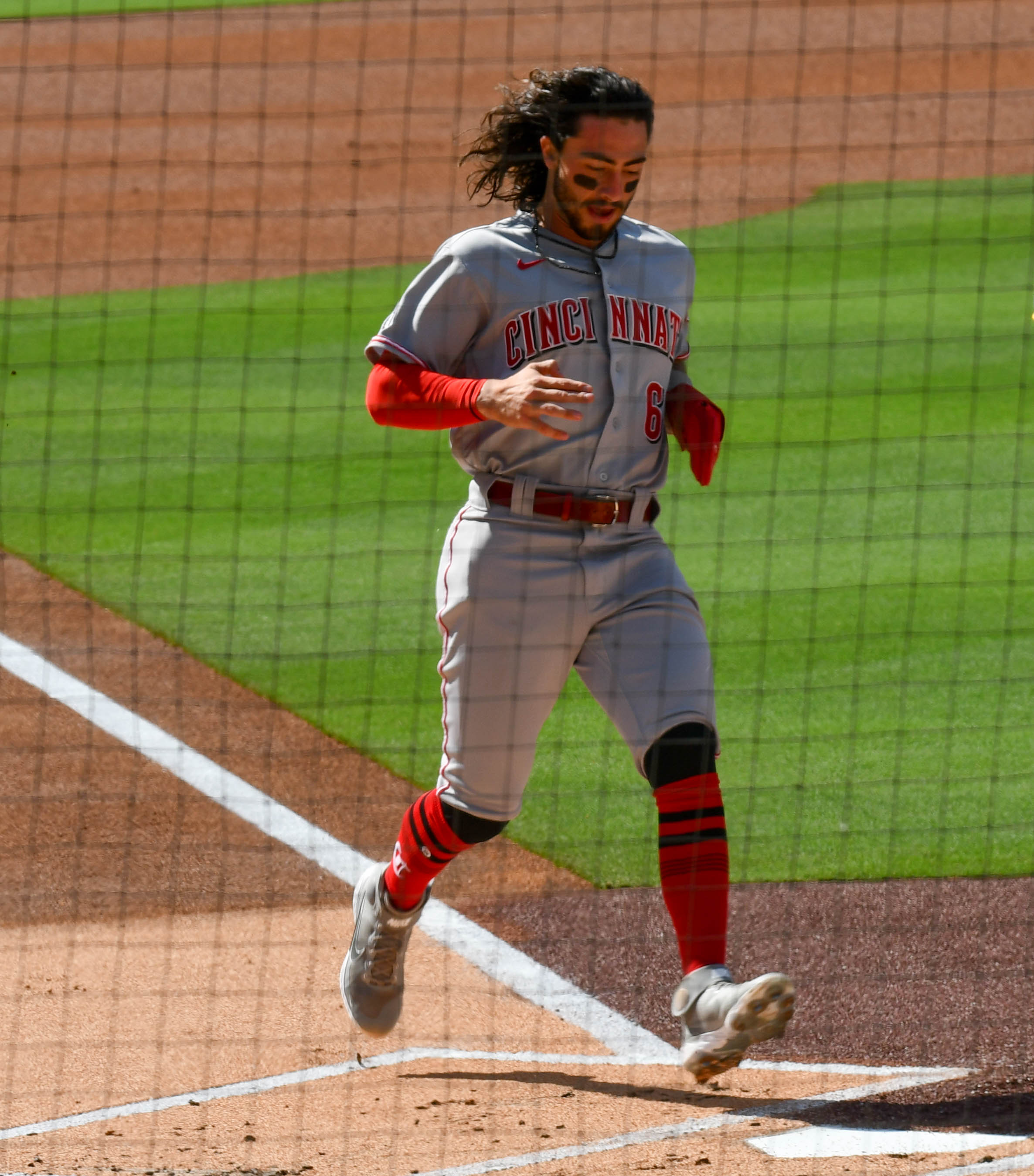
  Jonathan India, seen here scoring a run in a game played on June 19, 2021, hit two home runs against the Washington Nationals on Independence Day.
- July 5 – The Reds won their fifth consecutive road game, defeating the Nationals 9–2. Joey Votto and Elly De La Cruz each recorded three hits, scored twice and hit solo home runs. Cincinnati stole four bases in the game. Graham Ashcraft pitched six innings and allowing only one run in his start.
- July 6 – Nick Senzel hit a two-run home run in the 10th inning, as the Reds swept the Nationals, winning the final game of the four-game series by a 5–4 score. Alexis Díaz earned his 25th save in the victory.
- July 7 – Cincinnati wrapped up the first half of the season against the second place Milwaukee Brewers with a three-game series at American Family Field in Milwaukee, Wisconsin. In the series opener, Joey Votto had a home run and drove home three runners, but the Reds lost the game 7–3. The loss dropped the Reds divisional lead to one game.
- July 8 – Joey Votto hit a three-run home run, helping the Reds comeback after being down 4–1, as Cincinnati defeated the Brewers 8–5. Elly De La Cruz stole second, third and home in the seventh inning, bringing his season total to 16 in only 29 games.
- July 9 – The Reds were limited to only four hits, as Milwaukee won the final game of the series, defeating the Reds 1–0. The Reds enter the All-Star break with a record of 50–41, first place in the NL Central, one game ahead of the second place Brewers.
- July 11 – At the 2023 Major League Baseball All-Star Game held at T-Mobile Park in Seattle, Washington, Reds closer Alexis Díaz pitched the seventh inning, allowing two hits and a run, as the National League defeated the American League 3–2.
- July 14 – Cincinnati opened the second half of the season at home with a three-game series against the Milwaukee Brewers. The Reds managed only two hits, as the Brewers shutout Cincinnati 1–0. With the loss, the Reds and Brewers are tied for first place in the NL Central.
- July 15 – The Reds offense continued to struggle, as Cincinnati managed only one hit, getting shutout for their third consecutive game against Milwaukee, losing 3–0. Andrew Abbott pitched six innings, allowing three hits and two runs. With the loss, the Reds fall into second place, one game behind the Brewers.
- July 16 – Milwaukee completed the three-game series sweep of the Reds, as Cincinnati dropped the final game of the series 4–3. Jake Fraley hit a two-run home run, while Matt McLain had three hits and scored a run. With the loss, the Reds are now two games behind the Brewers in the NL Central.
- July 17 – The Reds continued their 10-game homestand with a four-game series against the San Francisco Giants. In the series opener, the Reds and Giants were tied 2–2 in the 8th inning before the game was suspended and was completed the next day. Jonathan India and Matt McLain each hit home runs for the Reds.
- July 18 – Game 1 – The Reds and Giants completed their game that was suspended the night before due to rain. In the 10th inning, the Giants scored twice, defeating Cincinnati 4–2. With the loss, the Reds losing streak is now at five games.
- July 18 – Game 2 – The Reds bats came alive, as Joey Votto, Jake Fraley, Will Benson and Christian Encarnacion-Strand each hit home runs. Unfortunately, the Giants also had hot bats, as San Francisco defeated Cincinnati 11–10, sending the Reds to their sixth straight loss.
- July 19 – Will Benson hit a three-run home run in the 3rd inning, leading the Reds to a 3–2 victory over the Giants to snap their losing skid. Graham Ashcraft pitched six innings, allowing two runs and striking out three batters, earning his fifth victory of the season. Alexis Díaz earned his 27th save of the season.
- July 20 – Andrew Abbott pitched eight innings, allowing only one hit, as the Reds defeated the Giants 5–1 to split the four-game series. Luke Maile had three hits, including a two-run home run.
- July 21 – The Reds hosted the Arizona Diamondbacks for a three-game weekend home series. In the series opener, Matt McLain hit a grand slam and Spencer Steer drove home three runners, leading Cincinnati to a 9–6 victory.
- July 22 – TJ Friedl, Jake Fraley and Matt McLain hit back-to-back-to-back home runs in the sixth inning, leading Cincinnati to a 4–2 victory over Arizona. Brandon Williamson pitched six innings, allowing only three hits and one run, to earn the win.
- July 23 – Elly De La Cruz led off the game with a home run, and Nick Senzel added a home run in the second inning, as Cincinnati completed the three-game sweep of the Diamondbacks, winning the final game 7–3. The win extends the Reds overall winning streak to five games.
- July 24 – The Reds travel to Milwaukee, Wisconsin to face the division leading Milwaukee Brewers at American Family Field for a three-game series. Elly De La Cruz hit a two-run home run, however, Cincinnati lost the game 3–2.
- July 25 – Will Benson hit a two-run home run in the ninth inning, giving the Reds the 4–0 lead, as Cincinnati held off a late surge from the Brewers, winning the game 4–3 and moving within a half game of Milwaukee for first place in the division. Andrew Abbott pitched six innings of shutout baseball, as he scattered seven hits and struck out nine, improving to 6–2 on the season and dropping his ERA to 1.90. Alexis Díaz recorded the final out in the ninth, earning his 30th save of the season.
- July 26 – The Reds were limited to six hits in a 3–0 loss to the Brewers. TJ Friedl and Joey Votto each recorded two hits for the Reds. Overall, Cincinnati batters struck out 18 times in the game. With the loss, the Reds dropped one and a half games behind the Brewers for first place in the NL Central and the team finished their season series with Milwaukee with a 3–10 record.
- July 28 – After an off-day, the Reds travelled to Dodger Stadium in Los Angeles, California for a three-game series against the NL West leading Los Angeles Dodgers. Jake Fraley and Spencer Steer each hit their 15th home runs of the season, leading Cincinnati to a 6–5 victory over the Dodgers.
- July 29 – The Reds dropped a close game to the Dodgers, losing 3–2. Luke Weaver pitched six innings, allowing only two hits and one earned run.
- July 30 – Elly De La Cruz had four hits, including his seventh home run of the season, as the Reds shutout the Dodgers 9–0. Matt McLain and Joey Votto also hit home runs for Cincinnati. Graham Ashcraft pitched six shutout innings to earn his sixth win of the season.
- July 31 – Cincinnati continued their road trip to Wrigley Field in Chicago, Illinois for a four-game road series against the Chicago Cubs. In the first game of the series, Joey Votto, Christian Encarnacion-Strand and Will Benson each had two hits, scored a run and drove home a run, as the Reds won the game 6–5. Alexis Díaz earned his MLB-leading 32nd save of the season. With the win, the Reds end the month with a 59–49 record and had a 1.5 game lead over the Milwaukee Brewers for first place in the NL Central.

==== August ====
- August 1 – Ben Lively was crushed in his start, allowing 13 runs in only four innings, as the Cubs easily defeated the Reds 20–9. Tyler Stephenson hit a two-run home run while Christian Encarnacion-Strand and Matt McLain drove home two runners.
- August 2 – Joey Votto slugged two home runs while Spencer Steer and TJ Friedl each hit solo home runs, however, the Reds pitching staff struggled, as Cincinnati lost to the Cubs 16–6.
- August 3 – The Reds dropped their third game in a row, losing 5–3 to the Cubs. Elly De La Cruz led off the game with a home run and Spencer Steer also hit a home run. With the loss, the Reds dropped out of first place, half a game behind the Milwaukee Brewers.
- August 4 – Cincinnati returned home for a three-game series against the Washington Nationals. Nick Senzel, Matt McLain and Elly De La Cruz each hit solo home runs, but the Reds lost their fourth game in a row, losing 6–3 to the Nationals in ten innings. Graham Ashcraft pitched eight innings, allowing five hits and three runs in his start.
- August 5 – The Reds lost their fifth game in a row, losing 7–3 to the Nationals. TJ Friedl hit a three-run home run. The Reds made four errors in the game, including two by Elly De La Cruz.
- August 6 – Cincinnati's struggles continued, as Lyon Richardson, in his MLB debut, allowed two home runs on his first two pitches. Joey Votto and TJ Friedl each hit home runs, however, the Reds lost their sixth game in a row, losing 6–3 to the Nationals.
- August 7 – The Reds began a three-game home series against the Miami Marlins. Heading into the series opener, the Reds held a half game lead over Miami for the final wild-card position. Down 1–0 in the third, TJ Friedl tripled home Will Benson and Elly De La Cruz, then in the fourth inning, Christian Encarnacion-Strand and Joey Votto hit home runs, as Cincinnati snapped their losing skid with a 5–2 victory. Brandon Williamson pitched 6.2 innings, allowing only one run and striking out nine, to earn the win.
- August 8 - TJ Friedl hit an RBI double and Stuart Fairchild hit a triple, then scored on an error for a Little League home run, however, the Reds lost the game, falling to the Marlins by a 3-2 score.
- August 9 - The Reds fell out of the final wild-card playoff spot, as the Marlins defeated Cincinnati 5-4. Spencer Steer and Christian Encarnacion-Strand each hit fourth inning home runs, while Joey Votto had three hits in the game. Graham Ashcraft pitched seven innings, allowing only three hits and one run while striking out seven.
- August 11 - Following a scheduled day off, the Reds were on the road for a divisional three-game series against the Pittsburgh Pirates at PNC Park in Pittsburgh, Pennsylvania. Elly De La Cruz had two hits and drove home three runners and Luke Maile hit a three-run home run, as the Reds defeated the Pirates 9-2. Andrew Abbott struck out nine batters in 5.2 innings to improve to 7-3 on the season.
- August 12 - The Reds-Pirates game was postponed due to rain. The teams will play a doubleheader on Sunday, August 13.
- August 13 - Game 1 – Spencer Steer had three hits and Matt McLain had two hits, scored a run and drove home another, as the Reds lost the first game of the doubleheader 4-2. Brandon Williamson allowed only two hits and one run in 5.2 innings pitched in his start.
- August 13 - Game 2 - Elly De La Cruz slugged his 10th home run of the season and Henry Ramos had three hits, as the Reds overcame a 5-3 deficit in the eighth inning to defeat the Pirates 6-5 in ten innings to split the doubleheader and win two of three games in the series.
- August 15 - After a day off, the Reds welcomed the Cleveland Guardians at home for the first two games of the Ohio Cup. Cincinnati's offense struggled, as they were limited to only six hits, as the Guardians shut out the Reds 3-0.
- August 16 - Matt McLain and Stuart Fairchild each hit two-run home runs, leading the Reds to a 7-2 victory and a series split against the Guardians. Andrew Abbott improved his win-loss record to 8-3 as he pitched five innings, allowing two runs and struck out five batters to earn the victory.
- August 18 - Following an off-day, Cincinnati were at home for a three-game interleague series against the Toronto Blue Jays. Christian Encarnacion-Strand hit a walk off solo home run in the bottom of the ninth inning, as the Reds shutout the Blue Jays 1-0. Brett Kennedy pitched five shutout innings in his start, allowing only three hits.
- August 19 - TJ Friedl hit a home run and Elly De La Cruz had two hits, including an RBI triple before scoring on a throwing error, as the Reds lost a close game to Toronto, falling 4-3.
- August 20 - Tyler Stephenson hit a solo home run and Spencer Steer had two hits and scored a run, as the Reds lost the series finale against the Blue Jays by a score of 10-3. Cincinnati committed four errors during the game while Hunter Greene struggled, allowing five home runs in three innings pitched.
- August 21 - The Reds were to begin a 10-game road trip with a three-game interleague series against the Los Angeles Angels at Angel Stadium in Anaheim, California, however, due to Hurricane Hilary, the series opener was postponed and will be made up as part of a doubleheader on August 23.
- August 22 - Matt McLain hit a first inning home run and Spencer Steer hit an RBI double in the fifth inning, scoring Elly De La Cruz and breaking 3-3 tie, as the Reds defeated the Angels 4-3. Graham Ashcraft pitched seven innings, allowing three runs and striking out 10 to win his seventh game of the season.
- August 23 - Game 1 - Elly De La Cruz had two hits, including a three-run homer and a three-run triple, as he drove him six runners in a 9-4 win over the Angels. Matt McLain scored four runs and Spencer Steer had three hits and drove home two runs.
- August 23 - Game 2 - TJ Friedl had three hits and an RBI, while Tyler Stephenson and Matt McLain each hit home runs, as the Reds swept the doubleheader and the three-game series against the Angels with a 7-3 victory. With the victory, the Reds jumped over the Arizona Diamondbacks and San Francisco Giants for the third and final wild-card position.
- August 24 - The Reds road trip continued with a four-game series against the Arizona Diamondbacks at Chase Field in Phoenix, Arizona. Nick Senzel hit an eight inning home run and Tyler Stephenson hit an RBI single, giving Cincinnati a 2-1 lead. The Diamondbacks completed the comeback by scoring two in the bottom of the eighth, as Cincinnati lost 3-2 and dropped out of a playoff spot.
- August 25 - Nick Martini hit two home runs and drove home four runners, and Will Benson hit a ninth inning grand slam, however, the Reds lost to the Diamondbacks by a 10-8 score.
- August 26 - Nick Martini had three hits and drove home two runners, while Matt McLain hit a home run and drove home two, as the Reds overcame a 4-0 deficit to defeat the Diamondbacks 8-7 in 11 innings. The Reds winning run was scored on a balk.
- August 27 - The Reds bats were limited to only four hits, as the Diamondbacks won the final game of the series by a 5-2 score. Graham Ashcraft had a good start, pitching 6.2 and allowing only two runs.
- August 28 - Cincinnati concluded their ten-game road trip with a three-game series against the San Francisco Giants at Oracle Park in San Francisco, California. Cincinnati was held to only one run and six hits, as the Giants won the series opener 4-1.
- August 29 - Giants starter Alex Cobb came within one out of pitching a no-hitter, as Spencer Steer hit a two-out RBI double in the top of the ninth inning, as Cincinnati lost to San Francisco 6-1. The loss drops the Reds two games behind the Giants for the final wild-card playoff position.
- August 30 - The Reds closed out the month of August with a 4-1 victory over the Giants. Christian Encarnacion-Strand had four hits, including a two-run home run. Hunter Greene allowed only one unearned run in 5.1 innings pitched, striking out six, to earn the win.

==== September/October ====
- September 1 - Game 1 - Cincinnati opened the final month of the season with a four-game series against the Chicago Cubs, beginning with a doubleheader. In the first game, Noelvi Marte had two hits, scored a run and drove home a run, in the Reds 6-2 loss to the Cubs.
- September 1 - Game 2 - Down 2-1 in the bottom of the ninth inning, Nick Martini tied the game with a solo home run. Then, with Stuart Fairchild on second base, Noelvi Marte hit a game-winning single, as Cincinnati defeated the Cubs 3-2 to split the doubleheader.
- September 2 - In the bottom of the ninth inning, down 1-0 to the Cubs, Elly De La Cruz drove home the tying run with a single, scoring Harrison Bader. Hunter Renfroe then grounded in a fielder's choice, however, TJ Friedl scored on the play, as Cincinnati won the game 2-1. Andrew Abbott pitched 6.1 innings in his start, allowing only one run and striking out five.
- September 3 - Spencer Steer, TJ Friedl and Tyler Stephenson each hit home runs, however, the Cubs won the game to split the series, defeating the Reds 15-7.
- September 4 - The Reds hosted the Seattle Mariners to begin a three-game home interleague series. Spencer Steer hit a three-run home run in the second lead, as Cincinnati cruised to a 6-3 win. Hunter Renfroe and Tyler Stephenson each had two hits in the victory.
- September 5 - Down 6-3 in the bottom of the eighth inning, Nick Martini hit a game-tying three-run home run. In the bottom of the ninth, the Reds completed the comeback on a single by Christian Encarnacion-Strand scored Elly De La Cruz, as Cincinnati won the game 7-6. With the win, the Reds moved into the final wild-card position.
- September 6 - Will Benson had three hits, including a solo home run, however, Cincinnati lost to the Mariners in the series finale, losing by a score of 8-4.
- September 8 - The Reds hosted their divisional rivals, the St. Louis Cardinals, for a three-game series. Hunter Renfroe and Nick Senzel each hit home runs in the third inning, however, the Reds lost the series opener by a score of 9-4. With the loss, Cincinnati drops 1.5 games behind the Arizona Diamondbacks for the third and final wild-card position.
- September 9 - Nick Senzel had two hits and scored a run, however, Cincinnati dropped their third game in a row, losing 4-3 to the Cardinals.
- September 10 - The Reds hit four home runs, as TJ Friedl, Joey Votto, Jonathan India and Will Benson each connected for one. Cincinnati's pitching staff, led by Hunter Greene, who pitched six innings and struck out nine batters, held the Cardinals to one hit, as Cincinnati won the game 7-1.
- September 12 - After an off-day, the Reds travelled to Comerica Park in Detroit, Michigan for a three-game interleague series against the Detroit Tigers. Harrison Bader had two hits and drove home two runners, as the Reds defeated the Tigers 6-5 in ten innings.
- September 13 - Noelvi Marte hit a two-run triple in the second inning, then scored the game winning run in the fourth, leading the Reds to a 4-3 victory over the Tigers. With the win, the Reds move back into the third and final wild-card position.
- September 14 - The Reds had solo home runs from Spencer Steer and TJ Friedl, however, the Tigers won the final game of the series, defeating Cincinnati 8-2.
- September 15 - Cincinnati concluded their road trip with a three-game series at Citi Field in Queens, New York against the New York Mets. Jonathan India broke a 3-3 tie with a two-run home run in the seventh inning, as the Reds defeated the Mets 5-3. Spencer Steer also hit a two-run home run in the victory.
- September 16 - Christian Encarnacion-Strand had two hits, including a two-run home run, as the Reds defeated the Mets 3-2 for their fifth win in their past six games. The Reds bullpen held the Mets to only two hits and no runs in 5.1 innings.
- September 17 - Nick Senzel and Christian Encarnacion-Strand both had two hits, and each hit home runs, however, Cincinnati lost the final game of the series, losing 8-4 to the Mets.
- September 18 - Cincinnati returned home for their final homestand of the regular season, as they host the Minnesota Twins for a three-game interleague series. Will Benson hit a two-run home run and drove home three runs and Spencer Steer had three hits, scored a run and drove home another run, as the Reds won the first game of the series, defeating the Twins 7-3. Connor Phillips pitched seven innings, allowing only three hits and two runs, while striking out seven, to earn his first career victory.
- September 19 - The Reds offense struggled, managing only four hits, in a 7-0 loss to Minnesota. Jake Fraley had a hit and earned two walks. Overall, Cincinnati hitters struck out 14 times in the game.
- September 20 - Hunter Greene had an exceptional start, pitching seven innings and becoming the first Reds pitcher since Ron Villone in 2000 to earn at least 14 strikeouts in a game, however, the Twins scored three runs in the ninth inning, coming from behind to beat Cincinnati 5-3. Christian Encarnacion-Strand hit a home run for the Reds.
- September 22 - After an off-day, the Reds welcomed the Pittsburgh Pirates for a three-game series, their final home series of the season. TJ Friedl reached base five times in the game and hit a two-run home run, however, the Reds lost their third consecutive game, dropping the game by a 7-5 score.
- September 23 - The Reds took a 9-0 lead in the third inning, however, Pittsburgh rallied from behind, and defeated Cincinnati 13-12. Christian Encarnacion-Strand had three hits, including a two-run home run, and drove home four runs, while scoring twice. TJ Friedl hit an inside-the-park home run in the second inning. With the loss, the Reds losing streak is extended to four games.
- September 24 - In the Reds final home game of the season, TJ Friedl and Christian Encarnacion-Strand each hit home runs as Cincinnati defeated Pittsburgh 4-2. Jonathan India had two hits and scored two runs. With the win, the Reds won their 80th game of the season and finish with a 38-43 record at home.
- September 26 - After an off-day, the Reds travelled to Progressive Field in Cleveland, Ohio for the final two games of the Ohio Cup against the Cleveland Guardians. The Reds and Guardians split the first two games of the series in early-August in Cincinnati. Elly De La Cruz hit two-home runs, including a 467-foot moon shot, and drove home four runners, as the Reds defeated the Guardians 11-7. TJ Friedl, Christian Encarnacion-Strand and Luke Maile also hit home runs in the victory.
- September 27 - Jonathan India had two hits and scored two runs, while Elly De La Cruz stole two bases, bringing his season total to 35, as the Reds lost a close game to the Guardians, by a score of 4-3. With the loss, the Reds sit 1.5 games behind the Miami Marlins and Chicago Cubs for the final wild-card position in the National League. Both the Reds and Guardians won two games in the Ohio Cup.
- September 29 - Following an off-day, the Reds closed out the regular season with a three-game series against the St. Louis Cardinals at Busch Stadium in St. Louis, Missouri. In the series opener, the Reds offense exploded for six home runs, as Cincinnati crushed St. Louis 19-2. Jonathan India, Spencer Steer, Christian Encarnacion-Strand, Nick Martini, Tyler Stephenson and Noelvi Marte all connected for home runs in the win. Brandon Williamson pitched six innings to earn the victory. The Reds remain alive in the playoff race, sitting 1.5 games behind the Miami Marlins ffor the final playoff spot with two games remaining in the season.
- September 30 - The Reds were eliminated from post-season contention with a 15-6 loss to the Cardinals. Noelvi Marte had four hits in the game, including a home run, and drove home three runners. The loss dropped the Reds two games out of the post-season, with only one game remaining in the season.
- October 1 - Cincinnati concluded the 2023 regular season with a 4-3 loss against the Cardinals. Nick Martini led off the game with a home run. With the loss, the Reds finished the season with a record of 82-80, a twenty game improvement over 2022.

=== Transactions ===
==== March ====
March 30	Placed 1B Joey Votto (left biceps and left rotator cuff surgeries) and OF Nick Senzel (left great toe injury) on the 10-day injured list retroactive to March 27, 2023. Place RHP's Tony Santillan (low back pars stress fracture), Lucas Sims (low back spasms) and Luke Weaver (right elbow flexor strain) on the 15-day injured list retroactive to March 27, 2023. Placed RHP's Tejay Antone (right elbow flexor strain) and Justin Dunn (right shoulder strain) on the 60-day injured list retroactive to March 27, 2023. Selected the contracts of LHP Alex Young, RHP Derek Law and 3B Jason Vosler from the Louisville Bats. Recalled OF Stuart Fairchild from the Louisville Bats. Designated 2B Nick Solak for assignment.
March 31	Traded 2B Nick Solak to the Seattle Mariners for cash.

==== April ====
April 1	Sent 1B Joey Votto on a rehab assignment to the Louisville Bats.
April 4	Sent RHP Tony Santillan and OF Nick Senzel on a rehab assignment to the Louisville Bats.
April 5	Designated LHP Bennett Sousa for assignment. Optioned RHP Joel Kuhnel to the Louisville Bats. Selected the contract of RHP Kevin Herget from the Louisville Bats.
April 9	Traded LHP Bennett Sousa to the Milwaukee Brewers for cash. Sent RHP's Lucas Sims and Luke Weaver on a rehab assignment to the Louisville Bats.
April 10	Signed free agent C Wilkin Grullon to a minor league contract.
April 13	Activated OF Nick Senzel from the 10-day injured list. Optioned RF Will Benson to the Louisville Bats.
April 15	Placed RHP Connor Overton (right elbow strain) on the 15-day injured list. Recalled RHP Casey Legumina from the Louisville Bats.
April 18	Activated RHP Lucas Sims from the 15-day injured list. Optioned RHP Kevin Herget to the Louisville Bats.
April 19	Optioned RHP Casey Legumina to the Louisville Bats. Recalled RHP Levi Stoudt from the Louisville Bats.
April 20	Optioned RHP Levi Stoudt to the Louisville Bats.
April 24	Designated 3B Jason Vosler for assignment. Selected the contract of RF Henry Ramos from the Louisville Bats.
April 27	Placed RHP Graham Ashcraft on the bereavement list. Placed 1B Wil Myers on the 10-day injured list retroactive to April 26. Sent 3B Jason Vosler outright to the Louisville Bats. Recalled RHP Casey Legumina from the Louisville Bats.
April 28	Placed RHP Tony Santillan (right knee strain) on the 60-day injured list. Selected the contract of 3B Matt Reynolds from the Louisville Bats.
April 30	Placed RHP Fernando Cruz (right shoulder strain) on the 15-day injured list. Activated RHP Graham Ashcraft from the bereavement list.

==== May ====
May 3	Traded RHP Chase Anderson to the Tampa Bay Rays for cash.
May 6	Designated 3B Matt Reynolds for assignment.
May 8	Claimed RHP Franklin German off waivers from the Chicago White Sox and optioned him to the Louisville Bats.
May 9	Placed LHP Reiver Sanmartin (left elbow stress reaction) on the 15-day injured list retroactive to May 8. Designated RHP Luis Cessa for assignment. Selected the contract of RHP Ben Lively from the Louisville Bats. Recalled RHP Kevin Herget from the Louisville Bats. Sent 3B Matt Reynolds outright to the Louisville Bats.
May 13	Optioned RHP Kevin Herget to the Louisville Bats. Recalled RHP Levi Stoudt from the Louisville Bats.
May 14	Released RHP Luis Cessa. Placed RHP Casey Legumina (right ankle contusion) on the 15-day injured list. Transferred LHP Reiver Sanmartin from the 15-day injured list to the 60-day injured list. Optioned RHP Levi Stoudt to the Louisville Bats. Recalled RHP Kevin Herget from the Louisville Bats. Selected the contracts of RHP's Alan Busenitz and Silvino Bracho from the Louisville Bats.
May 15	Placed 1B Joey Votto on the 60-day injured list. Selected the contract of SS Matt McLain from the Louisville Bats.
May 16	Optioned RHP Alan Busenitz to the Louisville Bats. Recalled LHP Brandon Williamson from the Louisville Bats.
May 17	Signed free agent RHP Alec Mills to a minor league contract.
May 19	Placed RHP Derek Law (right elbow sprain) on the 15-day injured list. Recalled RHP Alan Busenitz from the Louisville Bats. Signed free agent RHP Ryan Meisinger to a minor league contract.
May 20	Signed free agent RHP Teddy Stankiewicz to a minor league contract. Recalled RF Will Benson from the Louisville Bats.
May 21	Sent RHP Fernando Cruz on a rehab assignment to the Louisville Bats.
May 23	Signed free agent RHP Shea Spitzbarth to a minor league contract. Optioned RF Will Benson to the Louisville Bats. Activated CF TJ Friedl.
May 24	Designated RHP Silvino Bracho for assignment. Selected the contract of RHP Eduardo Salazar from the Louisville Bats.
May 26	Placed 1B Wil Myers (kidney stone) on the 10-day injured list retroactive to May 24. Optioned RHP Alan Busenitz to the Louisville Bats. Activated RHP Fernando Cruz from the 15-day injured list. Recalled RF Will Benson from the Louisville Bats.
May 27	Sent RHP Silvino Bracho outright to the Louisville Bats.

==== June ====
June 3	Placed CF TJ Friedl (left hamstring strain) on the 10-day injured list retroactive to May 31. Transferred LHP Nick Lodolo from the 15-day injured list to the 60-day injured list. Selected the contract of CF TJ Hopkins from the Louisville Bats. Sent 1B Joey Votto and RF Henry Ramos on a rehab assignment to the Louisville Bats.
June 5	Designated RHP Frank German for assignment. Optioned RHP Kevin Herget to the Louisville Bats. Selected the contract of LHP Andrew Abbott from the Louisville Bats.
June 6	Placed OF Nick Senzel (right knee) on the 10-day injured list retroactive to June 4. Recalled SS Elly De La Cruz from the Louisville Bats. Sent RHP Casey Legumina on a rehab assignment to the Louisville Bats. Sent RHP Frank German outright to the Louisville Bats.
June 8	Optioned RHP Eduardo Salazar to the Louisville Bats.
June 9	Sent 1B Wil Myers on a rehab assignment to the Louisville Bats. Placed RHP Graham Ashcraft (left calf contusion) on the 15-day injured list. Recalled RHP's Joel Kuhnel and Ricky Karcher from the Louisville Bats.
June 10	Placed CF Jake Fraley (right wrist contusion) on the 10-day injured list. Activated CF TJ Friedl from the 10-day injured list. Optioned RHP Joel Kuhnel to the Louisville Bats. Recalled RHP Kevin Herget from the Louisville Bats. Signed free agent RHP Michael Mariot to a minor league contract.
June 11	Optioned RHP Kevin Herget to the Louisville Bats. Activated RHP Casey Legumina from the 15-day injured list. Sent OF Nick Senzel on a rehab assignment to the Louisville Bats.
June 13	Activated RF Henry Ramos from the 10-day injured list and optioned him to the Louisville Bats. Optioned RHP Ricky Karcher to the Louisville Bats. Designated RHP Joel Kuhnel for assignment. Sent RHP Tony Santillan on a rehab assignment to the Louisville Bats. Selected the contract of RHP Daniel Duarte from the Louisville Bats.
June 16	Optioned SS José Barrero to the Louisville Bats. Activated OF Nick Senzel from the 10-day injured list.
June 17	Traded RHP Joel Kuhnel to the Houston Astros for cash.
June 18	Optioned CF T.J. Hopkins to the Louisville Bats. Activated CF Jake Fraley from the 10-day injured list.
June 19	Reinstated Joey Votto from the 60-day injured list. Placed RHP Hunter Greene on the 15-day injured list retroactive to June 18. Designated RHP Kevin Herget for assignment.
June 20	Designated 1B Wil Myers for assignment.
June 21	Placed RHP Casey Legumina on the 15-day injured list. Selected the contract of RHP Silvino Bracho from the Louisville Bats. Optioned OF Stuart Fairchild to the Louisville Bats. Recalled RHP Alan Busenitz from the Louisville Bats.
June 22	Sent RHP Kevin Herget outright to the Louisville Bats.
June 23	Released 1B Wil Myers.
June 24	Placed RHP Ben Lively (right pectoral muscle strain) on the 15-day injured list retroactive to June 21. Optioned RHP Alan Busenitz to the Louisville Bats. Activated RHP Graham Ashcraft from the 15-day injured list.
June 25	Designated RHP Silvino Bracho for assignment. Selected the contract of RHP Randy Wynne from the Louisville Bats. Sent RHP Derek Law on a rehab assignment to the Dayton Dragons.
June 26	Designated RHP Randy Wynne for assignment. Optioned RHP Levi Stoudt to the Louisville Bats. Selected the contract of RHP Jake Wong from the Louisville Bats. Recalled RHP Eduardo Salazar from the Louisville Bats.
June 27	Designated RHP Jake Wong for assignment. Sent RHP Silvino Bracho outright to the Louisville Bats. Selected the contract of RHP Alec Mills from the Louisville Bats.
June 28	Sent RHP Randy Wynne outright to the Louisville Bats. Sent RHP Derek Law on a rehab assignment to the Louisville Bats.

==== July ====
July 1	Sent RHP Jake Wong outright to the Louisville Bats.
July 2	Optioned RHP Eduardo Salazar to the Louisville Bats. Designated RHP Alec Mills for assignment. Activated RHP Derek Law from the 15-day injured list. Recalled OF Stuart Fairchild from the Louisville Bats.
July 4	Optioned OF Stuart Fairchild to the Louisville Bats. Sent RHP Alec Mills outright to the Louisville Bats. Selected the contract of RHP Brett Kennedy from the Louisville Bats.
July 6	Designated RHP Ricky Karcher for assignment. Optioned RHP Brett Kennedy to the Louisville Bats. Activated RHP Tony Santillan from the 60-day injured list.
July 8	Designated RF Henry Ramos for assignment. Optioned RHP Tony Santillan to the Louisville Bats. Selected the contract of RHP Michael Mariot from the Louisville Bats.
July 9	Designated RHP Michael Mariot for assignment. Activated RHP Ben Lively from the 15-day injured list.
July 10	Sent RHP Ricky Karcher and RF Henry Ramos outright to the Louisville Bats.
July 11	Sent RHP Michael Mariot outright to the Louisville Bats.
July 17	Placed SS Kevin Newman (gastiris) on the 10-day injured list retroactive to July 14. Selected the contract of 3B Christian Encarnacion-Strand from the Louisville Bats. Signed free agent LHP Nick Sando to a minor league contract. Signed RHP Simon Miller.
July 18	Recalled RHP Tony Santillan from the Louisville Bats.
July 19	Optioned RHP's Tony Santillan and Daniel Duarte to the Louisville Bats. Recalled RHP Levi Stoudt from the Louisville Bats. Signed free agent RHP's Sebastián Salazar and Johan Cabeza to minor league contracts.
July 21	Signed free agent C Qyshawn Legito to a minor league contract.
July 24	Placed C Curt Casali (left foot contusion) on the 10-day injured list retroactive to July 21. Optioned RHP Levi Stoudt to the Louisville Bats. Activated SS Kevin Newman from the 10-day injured list. Recalled RHP Daniel Duarte from the Louisville Bats.
July 25	Signed free agent RHP Gabe Starks to a minor league contract. Sent RHP Tejay Antone on a rehab assignment to the ACL Reds.
July 28	Sent RHP's Casey Legumina and Vladimir Gutierrez on rehab assignments to ACL Reds.
July 30	Placed 3B Jonathan India (left foot plantar fasciitis) on the 10-day injured list retroactive to July 29. Recalled OF Stuart Fairchild from the Louisville Bats.
July 31	Acquired LHP Sam Moll from the Oakland Athletics in exchange for RHP Joe Boyle. Assigned LHP Sam Moll to the minor leagues. Transferred RHP Hunter Greene (right hip pain) from the 15-day injured list to the 60-day injured list.

==== August ====
August 1	Optioned RHP Daniel Duarte to the Louisville Bats. Activated LHP Sam Moll. Sent RHP Hunter Greene on a rehab assignment to the ACL Reds. Sent RHP Casey Legumina on a rehab assignment to the Louisville Bats. SS Bernard Moon assigned to ACL Reds.
August 2	Placed RHP Ben Lively (right pectoral strain) on the 15-day injured list. Recalled RHP Daniel Duarte from the Louisville Bats. Sent RHP Tejay Antone on a rehab assignment to the Louisville Bats.
August 5	Placed CF Jake Fraley (stress fracture in left fourth toe) on the 10-day injured list retroactive to August 4. Recalled CF TJ Hopkins from the Louisville Bats. Sent RHP's Vladimir Gutiérrez and Hunter Greene on rehab assignments to the Louisville Bats. Signed free agent RHP's Nick Payero and Carson Lambert to minor league contracts.
August 6	Optioned RHP Daniel Duarte to the Louisville Bats. Recalled RHP Lyon Richardson from the Louisville Bats.
August 7	Activated RHP Casey Legumina from the 15-day injured list. Optioned RHP's Casey Legumina and Lyon Richardson to the Louisville Bats. Recalled RHP Brett Kennedy from the Louisville Bats.
August 11	Optioned OF Nick Senzel to the Louisville Bats. Designated Eduardo Salazar for assignment. Selected the contract of Henry Ramos from the Louisville Bats. Sent LHP Nick Lodolo on a rehab assignment to the ACL Reds. Sent C Curt Casali on a rehab assignment to the Louisville Bats.
August 13	Sent RHP Eduardo Salazar outright to the Louisville Bats. Sent RHP Ben Lively on a rehab assignment to the Louisville Bats. Recalled RHP Daniel Duarte from the Louisville Bats.
August 14	Optioned RHP Daniel Duarte to the Louisville Bats.
August 15	Sent LHP Nick Lodolo on a rehab assignment to the Chattanooga Lookouts.
August 16	Designated RHP Luke Weaver for assignment. Recalled RHP Alan Busenitz from the Louisville Bats. Sent RHP Justin Dunn on a rehab assignment to the ACL Reds.
August 17	Signed free agent LHP Chasen Shreve to a minor league contract.
August 18	Released RHP Luke Weaver.
August 19	Placed SS Kevin Newman (left oblique strain) on the 10-day injured list retroactive to August 16. Recalled SS Noelvi Marte from the Louisville Bats.
August 20	Activated RHP Hunter Greene from the 60-day injured list. Optioned RHP Alan Busenitz to the Louisville Bats.
August 22	Placed OF Stuart Fairchild (concussion) on the 7-day injured list. Designated RF Henry Ramos for assignment. Selected the contract of LF Nick Martini from the Louisville Bats. Recalled OF Michael Siani from the Louisville Bats. Sent RHP Justin Dunn on a rehab assignment to the Louisville Bats.
August 23	Recalled RHP Lyon Richardson from the Louisville Bats. Signed free agent LF Trey Mancini to a minor league contract.
August 24	Placed 1B Joey Votto (left shoulder discomfort) on the 10-day injured list. Sent RF Henry Ramos outright to the Louisville Bats. Recalled OF Nick Senzel from the Louisville Bats.
August 25	Optioned RHP Lyon Richardson to the Louisville Bats.
August 26	Placed LHP Alex Young (left hamstring tightness) on the 15-day injured list retroactive to August 25. Activated RHP Ben Lively from the 15-day injured list. Sent OF Stuart Fairchild on a rehab assignment to the Louisville Bats.
August 27	Optioned RHP Brett Kennedy to the Louisville Bats. Recalled RHP Daniel Duarte from the Louisville Bats.
August 28	Placed SS Matt McLain (right oblique strain) on the 10-day injured list. Activated OF Stuart Fairchild from the 7-day injured list.
August 29	Optioned OF Michael Siani to the Louisville Bats. Selected the contract of 2B Alejo López from the Louisville Bats. Sent CF Jake Fraley on a rehab assignment to the Louisville Bats. Designated RHP Tony Santillan for assignment.
August 31	Designated OF Michael Siani and 2B Alejo López for assignment. Claimed RF Hunter Renfroe off waivers from the Los Angeles Angels and CF Harrison Bader from the New York Yankees.

==== September/October ====
September 1	Placed RHP Hunter Greene on the 10-day injured list retroactive to August 31. Placed RHP's Fernando Cruz and Ben Lively on the 15-day injured list retroactive to August 31. Designated RHP Alan Busenitz for assignment. Sent RHP Tony Santillan outright to the Louisville Bats. Optioned CF TJ Hopkins to the Louisville Bats. Activated RHP Tejay Antone from the 60-day injured list. Activated CF Jake Fraley from the 10-day injured list. Activated CF Harrison Bader. Selected the contract of RHP Carson Spiers from the Chattanooga Lookouts. Recalled RHP's Brett Kennedy and Lyon Richardson from the Louisville Bats.
September 2	Placed RHP Graham Ashcraft (right big toe stress reaction) on the 15-day injured list. St. Louis Cardinals claimed OF Michael Siani off waivers. Sent 2B Alejo López outright to Louisville Bats. Selected the contracts of RHP Connor Phillips and LHP Chasen Shreve from the Louisville Bats.
September 4	Sent RHP Alan Busenitz outright to the Louisville Bats. Optioned RHP Brett Kennedy to the Louisville Bats. Returned RHP Lyon Richardson to the Louisville Bats. Recalled RHP Casey Legumina from the Louisville Bats. Selected the contract of RHP Michael Mariot from the Louisville Bats.
September 5	Designated RHP Michael Mariot for assignment. Sent SS Kevin Newman on a rehab assignment to the Louisville Bats. Selected the contract of RHP Kevin Herget from the Louisville Bats. Signed free agent RHP Danis Correa to a minor league contract.
September 6	Optioned RHP Casey Legumina to the Louisville Bats. Recalled RHP Lyon Richardson from the Louisville Bats.
September 7	Sent RHP Michael Mariot outright to the Louisville Bats.
September 8	Designated RHP Kevin Herget for assignment. Activated RHP Fernando Cruz from the 15-day injured list. Sent 1B Joey Votto and 3B Jonathan India on rehab assignments to the Louisville Bats.
September 9	Placed OF Stuart Fairchild on the 7-day injured list. Placed LHP Alex Young on the 7-day injured list retroactive to September 8. Selected the contract of 2B Alejo Lopez from the Louisville Bats.
September 10	Returned RHP Carson Spiers and 2B Alejo Lopez to the Louisville Bats. Optioned RHP Lyon Richardson to the Louisville Bats. Activated RHP Hunter Greene, 3B Jonathan India and 1B Joey Votto from the 10-day injured list.
September 12	Designated LHP Chasen Shreve for assignment. Activated LHP Brandon Williamson from the 7-day injured list.
September 14	Placed RHP Tejay Antone (right elbow discomfort) on the 15-day injured list. Optioned RHP Connor Phillips to the Louisville Bats. Activated RHP Ben Lively from the 15-day injured list. Selected the contract of RHP Carson Spiers from the Louisville Bats.
September 15	Sent OF Stuart Fairchild on a rehab assignment to the Louisville Bats.
September 16	Released LHP Chasen Shreve.
September 18	Placed CF Harrison Bader (right groin strain) on the 10-day injured list. Designated RF Hunter Renfroe for assignment. Optioned RHP Carson Spiers to the Louisville Bats. Transferred RHP Graham Ashcraft (right big toe stress reaction) from the 15-day injured list to the 60-day injured list. Activated OF Stuart Fairchild and LHP Alex Young from the 7-day injured list. Selected the contract of RHP Connor Phillips from the Louisville Bats.
September 21	Released RF Hunter Renfroe.
September 23	Sent SS Matt McLain on a rehab assignment to the Louisville Bats.
September 25	Designated SS Kevin Newman for assignment.
September 27	Released SS Kevin Newman.
September 29	Placed RHP Daniel Duarte (right shoulder tightness) on the 15-day injured list retroactive to September 28. Recalled RHP Carson Spiers from the Louisville Bats.
October 1	Optioned RHP Carson Spiers to the ACL Reds. Selected the contract of RHP Alan Busenitz from the Louisville Bats.

== Roster ==
2023 Cincinnati Reds
Roster
Pitchers: 41 Andrew Abbott; 70 Tejay Antone; 51 Graham Ashcraft; 69 Silvino Bracho; 78 Alan Busenitz; 85 Luis Cessa; 63 Fernando Cruz; 43 Alexis Díaz; 77 Daniel Duarte; 46 Buck Farmer; 79 Ian Gibaut; 21 Hunter Greene; 57 Kevin Herget; 74 Ricky Karcher; 66 Brett Kennedy; 66 Joel Kuhnel; 47 Derek Law; 65 Casey Legumina; 59 Ben Lively; 40 Nick Lodolo; 86 Michael Mariot; 50 Alec Mills; 50 Sam Moll; 71 Connor Overton; 34 Connor Phillips; 72 Lyon Richardson; 81 Eduardo Salazar; 52 Reiver Sanmartín; 64 Tony Santillan; 38 Chasen Shreve; 39 Lucas Sims; 68 Carson Spiers; 58 Levi Stoudt; 34 Luke Weaver; 55 Brandon Williamson; 85 Jake Wong; 82 Randy Wynne; 48 Alex Young	Catchers: 12 Curt Casali; 22 Luke Maile; 37 Tyler Stephenson; Infielders: 2 José Barrero; 44 Elly De La Cruz; 33 Christian Encarnacion-Strand; 6 Jonathan India; 35 Alejo López; 16 Noelvi Marte; 9 Matt McLain; 28 Kevin Newman; 3 Matt Reynolds; 15 Nick Senzel; 7 Spencer Steer; 32 Jason Vosler; 19 Joey Votto	Outfielders: 4 Harrison Bader; 30 Will Benson; 17 Stuart Fairchild; 27 Jake Fraley; 29 TJ Friedl; 26 TJ Hopkins; 23 Nick Martini; 4 Wil Myers; 31 Henry Ramos; 32 Hunter Renfroe; 38 Mike Siani	Manager: 25 David Bell; Coaches: 92 Kyle Arnsberg (assistant coach); 45 Freddie Benavides (bench); 60 Terry Bradshaw (assistant hitting); 54 Collin Cowgill (first base); 91 Jose Duarte (bullpen catcher); 56 J. R. House (third base/catching); 36 Derek Johnson (director of pitching); 88 Alon Leichman (assistant pitching); 62 Joel McKeithan (hitting/offensive coordinator); 61 Jeff Pickler (game planning/outfield); 90 Matt Tracy (bullpen)

== Player statistics ==
= Indicates team leader

=== Batting ===
Note: G = Games played; AB = At bats; R = Runs; H = Hits; 2B = Doubles; 3B = Triples; HR = Home runs; RBI = Runs batted in; SB = Stolen bases; BB = Walks; AVG = Batting average; SLG = Slugging average

Player	G	AB	R	H	2B	3B	HR	RBI	SB	BB	AVG	SLG
Spencer Steer	156	582	74	158	37	3	23	86	15	68	.271	.464
T. J. Friedl	138	488	73	136	22	8	18	66	27	47	.279	.467
Tyler Stephenson	142	465	59	113	20	2	13	56	0	47	.243	.378
Jonathan India	119	454	78	111	23	0	17	61	14	52	.244	.407
Elly De La Cruz	98	388	67	91	15	7	13	44	35	35	.235	.410
Matt McLain	89	365	65	106	23	4	16	50	14	31	.290	.507
Jake Fraley	111	386	41	86	18	0	15	65	21	37	.256	.443
Nick Senzel	104	301	49	71	10	0	13	42	6	26	.236	.399
Will Benson	108	287	51	79	15	8	11	31	19	40	.275	.498
Kevin Newman	74	225	28	57	16	0	3	28	8	17	.253	.364
Christian Encarnacion-Strand	63	222	29	60	7	0	13	37	2	14	.270	.477
Stuart Fairchild	97	219	34	50	16	2	5	28	10	25	.228	.388
Joey Votto	65	208	26	42	6	0	14	38	0	27	.202	.433
Luke Maile	74	179	17	42	10	0	6	25	2	14	.235	.391
José Barrero	46	133	15	29	8	0	2	17	3	15	.218	.323
Wil Myers	37	127	11	24	3	0	3	12	2	12	.189	.283
Noelvi Marte	35	114	15	36	7	0	3	15	6	8	.316	.456
Curt Casali	40	80	8	14	2	0	0	6	0	11	.175	.200
Henry Ramos	23	74	9	18	3	1	0	5	2	11	.243	.311
Nick Martini	29	72	10	19	3	1	6	16	0	5	.264	.583
Jason Vosler	20	62	6	10	2	1	3	10	0	3	.161	.371
T. J. Hopkins	25	41	7	7	0	0	0	1	1	2	.171	.171
Hunter Renfroe	14	39	4	5	0	0	1	4	0	5	.128	.205
Harrison Bader	14	31	4	5	1	0	0	3	3	3	.161	.194
Matt Reynolds	2	5	1	1	0	0	0	0	0	0	.200	.200
Alejo López	1	2	1	1	1	0	0	1	0	0	.500	1.000
Michael Siani	3	0	1	0	0	0	0	0	0	1	.---	.---
Totals	162	5499	783	1371	268	37	198	747	190	556	.249	.420
Rank in NL	—	7	5	8	10	2	7	5	1	6	9	5

Source:Baseball Reference

=== Pitching ===
Note: W = Wins; L = Losses; ERA = Earned run average; G = Games pitched; GS = Games started; SV = Saves; IP = Innings pitched; H = Hits allowed; R = Runs allowed; ER = Earned runs allowed; BB = Walks allowed; SO = Strikeouts

Player	W	L	ERA	G	GS	SV	IP	H	R	ER	BB	SO
Graham Ashcraft	7	9	4.76	26	26	0	145.2	148	78	77	52	111
Brandon Williamson	5	5	4.46	23	23	0	117.0	111	63	58	39	98
Hunter Greene	4	7	4.82	22	22	0	112.0	111	65	60	48	152
Andrew Abbott	8	6	3.87	21	21	0	109.1	100	47	47	44	120
Luke Weaver	2	4	6.87	21	21	0	97.0	125	76	74	34	85
Ben Lively	4	7	5.38	19	12	0	88.2	96	53	53	25	79
Ian Gibaut	8	4	3.33	74	0	3	75.2	69	33	28	28	69
Buck Farmer	4	5	4.20	71	0	3	75.0	58	36	35	29	70
Alexis Díaz	9	6	3.07	71	0	37	67.1	44	30	23	36	86
Fernando Cruz	1	2	4.91	58	2	0	66.0	52	39	36	28	98
Lucas Sims	7	3	3.10	67	0	3	61.0	33	23	21	39	72
Derek Law	4	6	3.60	54	3	2	55.0	50	24	22	26	45
Alex Young	4	2	3.86	63	0	1	53.2	53	27	23	20	50
Nick Lodolo	2	1	6.29	7	7	0	34.1	50	24	24	10	47
Daniel Duarte	3	0	3.69	31	0	1	31.2	24	14	13	20	23
Luis Cessa	1	4	9.00	7	6	0	26.0	46	26	26	12	11
Sam Moll	2	0	0.73	25	0	0	24.2	13	2	2	11	22
Kevin Herget	1	2	5.18	14	0	1	24.1	26	14	14	6	13
Connor Phillips	1	1	6.97	5	5	0	20.2	18	16	16	13	26
Brett Kennedy	1	0	6.50	5	2	0	18.0	19	13	13	7	9
Lyon Richardson	0	2	8.64	4	4	0	16.2	17	16	16	15	12
Reiver Sanmartín	1	0	7.07	14	0	0	14.0	17	13	11	10	13
Carson Spiers	0	1	6.92	4	2	1	13.0	18	12	10	7	12
Casey Legumina	1	0	5.68	11	0	0	12.2	16	11	8	9	11
Eduardo Salazar	1	0	8.03	8	0	0	12.1	16	11	11	5	5
Connor Overton	0	1	11.45	3	3	0	11.0	19	14	14	7	9
Levi Stoudt	0	1	9.58	4	2	0	10.1	16	11	11	8	9
Silvino Bracho	0	0	3.68	5	0	0	7.1	5	3	3	6	6
Alan Busenitz	0	0	2.57	6	0	0	7.0	8	2	2	1	5
Tejay Antone	0	0	1.59	5	1	0	5.2	3	1	1	2	7
Luke Maile	0	0	16.62	4	0	0	4.1	12	8	8	0	0
Tony Santillan	1	0	2.70	3	0	0	3.1	4	1	1	5	1
Joel Kuhnel	0	0	8.10	2	0	0	3.1	6	3	3	2	0
Chasen Shreve	0	0	2.70	3	0	0	3.1	1	1	1	2	3
Jake Wong	0	0	9.00	1	0	0	3.0	6	3	3	3	0
Michael Mariot	0	0	3.38	1	0	0	2.2	4	1	1	1	2
Randy Wynne	0	1	3.86	1	0	0	2.1	3	1	1	1	0
Jason Vosler	0	0	4.50	2	0	0	2.0	5	1	1	0	0
Alec Mills	0	0	18.00	1	0	0	1.0	4	5	2	1	0
Ricky Karcher	0	0	0.00	1	0	1	1.0	0	0	0	1	0
Totals	82	80	4.83	162	162	53	1439.1	1426	821	772	613	1381
Rank in NL	8	7	13	—	—	1	6	12	12	13	15	8

Note: No qualifiers in ERA, no pitchers with minimum 162 innings pitched.

Source:Baseball Reference

== Farm system ==
Level	Team	League	Manager
AAA	Louisville Bats	International League	Pat Kelly
AA	Chattanooga Lookouts	Southern League	José Moreno
High-A	Dayton Dragons	Midwest League	Bryan LaHair
Low-A	Daytona Tortugas	Florida State League	Julio Morillo
Rookie	ACL Reds	Arizona Complex League	Gustavo Molina
Foreign Rookie	DSL Reds	Dominican Summer League	Juan Ballara
