= Randy Wynne =

American baseball player (born 1993)

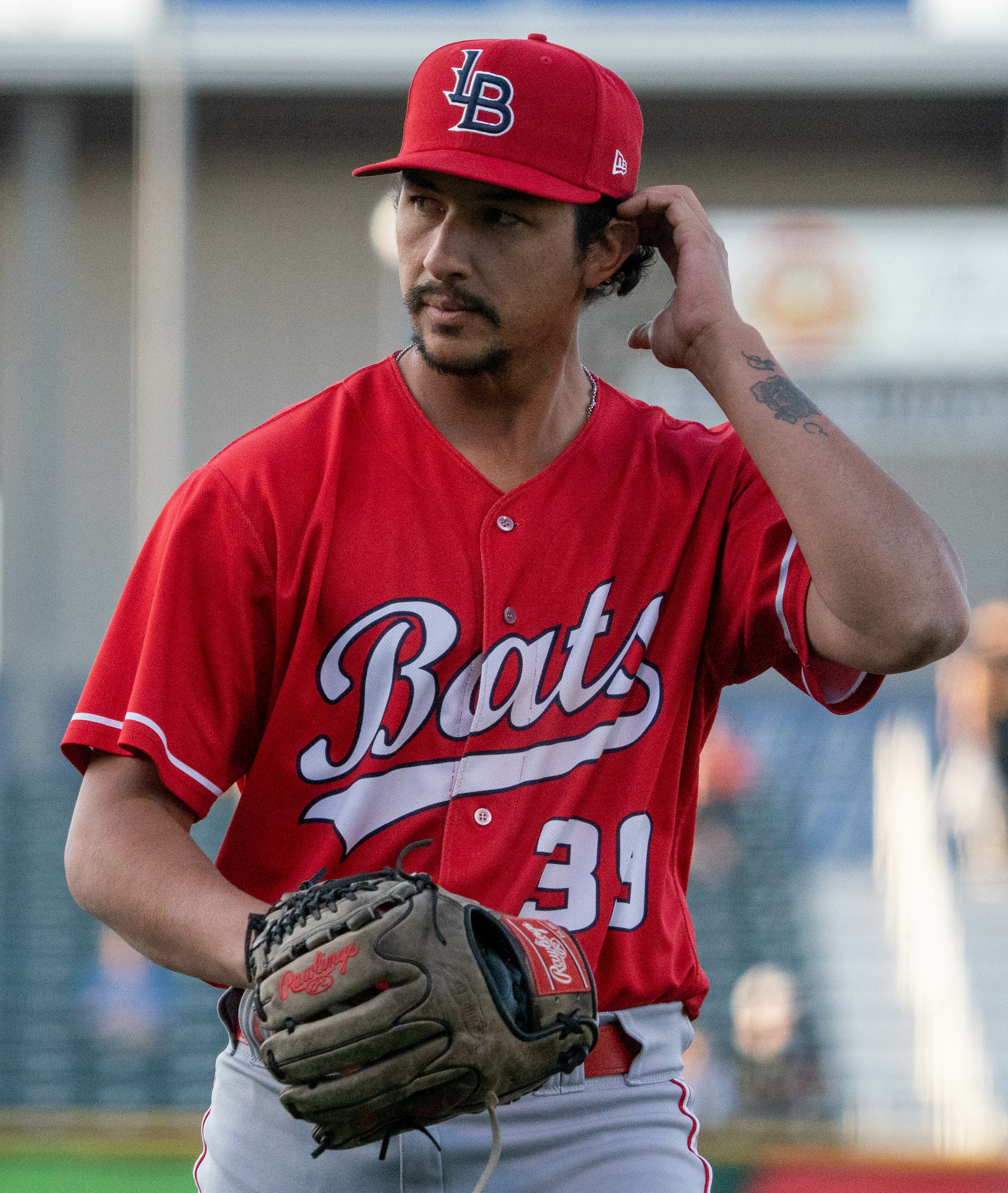
- Wynne with the Louisville Bats in 2023

Toros de Tijuana – No. 36
- Pitcher
- Born: March 9, 1993 (age 33); San Diego, California, U.S.
- Bats: Right Throws: Right

MLB debut
- June 25, 2023, for the Cincinnati Reds

MLB statistics (through 2025 season)
- Win–loss record: 0–1
- Earned run average: 3.38
- Strikeouts: 3
- Stats at Baseball Reference

Teams
- Cincinnati Reds (2023, 2025)

Randall Garrett Wynne (born March 9, 1993) is an American professional baseball pitcher for the Toros de Tijuana of the Mexican League. He has previously played in Major League Baseball (MLB) for the Cincinnati Reds.

== Career ==
=== Amateur ===
Wynne played college baseball for Grossmont College and Missouri Baptist University. He was not selected in the 2015 Major League Baseball draft.

=== Birmingham-Bloomfield Beavers ===
Wynne made his professional debut in 2016 with the Birmingham-Bloomfield Beavers of the United Shore Professional Baseball League, an independent baseball league. In 17 games (10 starts), he logged a 5–4 record and 3.08 ERA with 55 strikeouts across 61 1/3 innings of work. The following year, Wynne made 16 appearances (15 starts) and registered an 8–4 record and 3.30 ERA with 90 strikeouts in 95 1/3 innings pitched.

=== Evansville Otters ===
On January 29, 2018, Wynne signed with the Evansville Otters of the independent Frontier League. In 23 games (19 starts) for Evansville, Wynne pitched to a 9–9 record and 3.55 ERA with 114 strikeouts across 134 1/3 innings of work. He made 7 starts for the team in 2019, going 5–2 with a 3.42 ERA and 47 strikeouts in 50 innings pitched.

=== Cincinnati Reds ===
On June 18, 2019, Wynne signed a minor league contract with the Cincinnati Reds organization. In his second game for the rookie-level Greeneville Reds, he recorded 17 strikeouts. He made 16 appearances split between the rookie-level Arizona League Reds, Greeneville, and Single-A Dayton Dragons, with a combined 5–3 record and 3.34 ERA with 69 strikeouts in 67 1/3 innings of work. Wynne did not play in a game in 2020 due to the cancellation of the minor league season because of the COVID-19 pandemic.

In 2021, Wynne spent the season with the Double-A Chattanooga Lookouts. In 25 games (14 starts), he worked to an 8–4 record and 4.94 ERA with 67 strikeouts and one save across 89 1/3 innings of work. He was promoted to the Triple-A Louisville Bats, pitching in 26 games (22 starts) and posting a 6–11 record and 4.75 ERA with 85 strikeouts in 132 2/3 innings pitched.

He returned to Triple-A to begin the 2023 season. On June 25, Wynne was selected to the 40-man roster and promoted to the major leagues for the first time. Wynne lost his major league debut that same day, pitching 2 1/3 innings with three hits and one walk allowed in a loss to the Atlanta Braves. On June 26, Wynne was designated for assignment by Cincinnati following the promotion of Jake Wong. He cleared waivers and was sent outright to the Triple-A Louisville Bats on June 28.

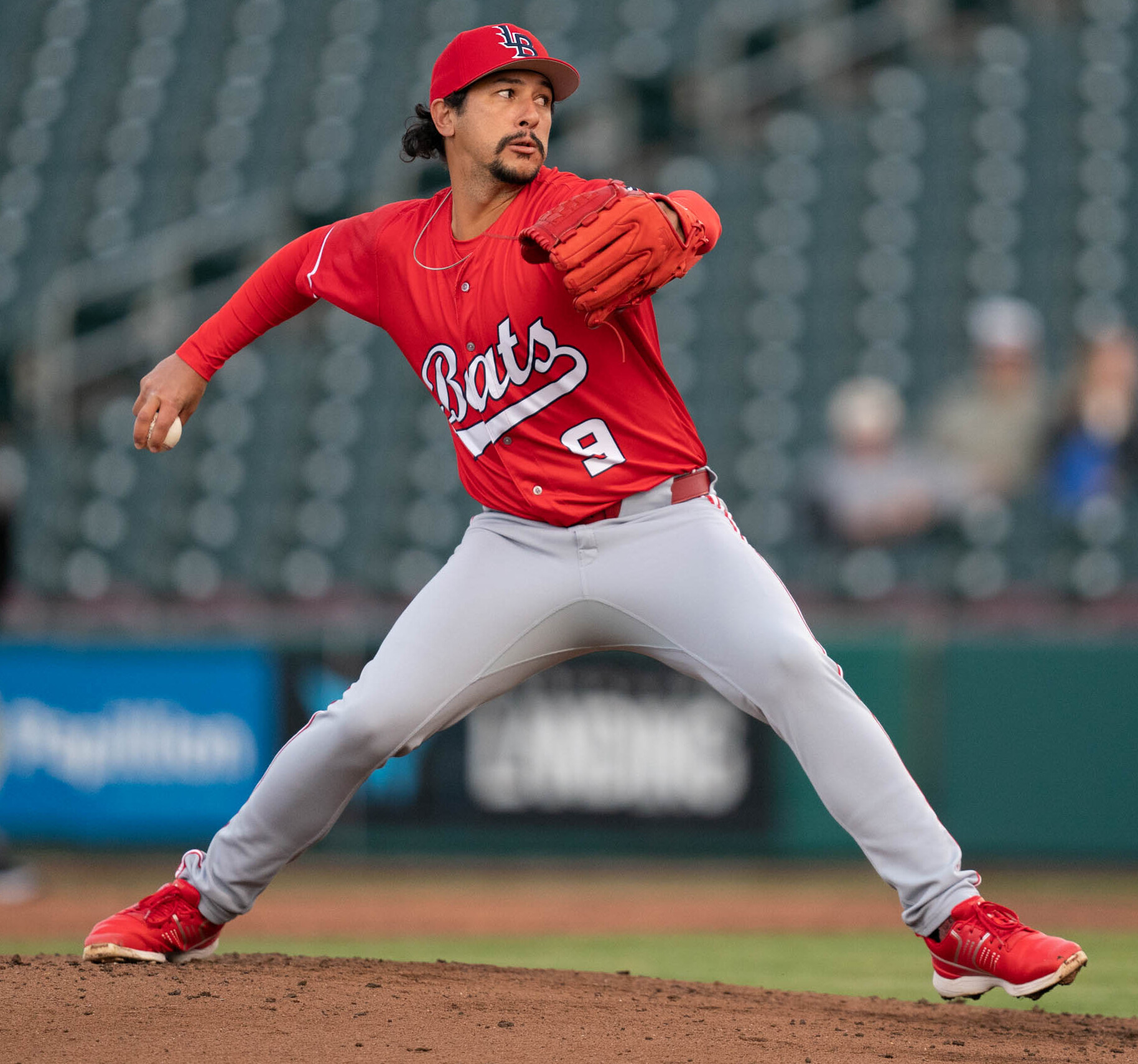
Wynne with Louisville in 2025

On April 20, 2025, the Reds selected Wynne's contract, adding him back to their active roster. He made one appearance for Cincinnati, earning the save after throwing three innings against the Baltimore Orioles, allowing one run on three hits with three strikeouts. On April 24, Wynne was removed from the 40-man roster and sent outright to Triple-A Louisville. He elected free agency on October 14.

=== Toros de Tijuana ===
On April 18, 2026, Wynne signed with the Toros de Tijuana of the Mexican League.
