= Jared Solomon (baseball) =

American baseball player (born 1997)

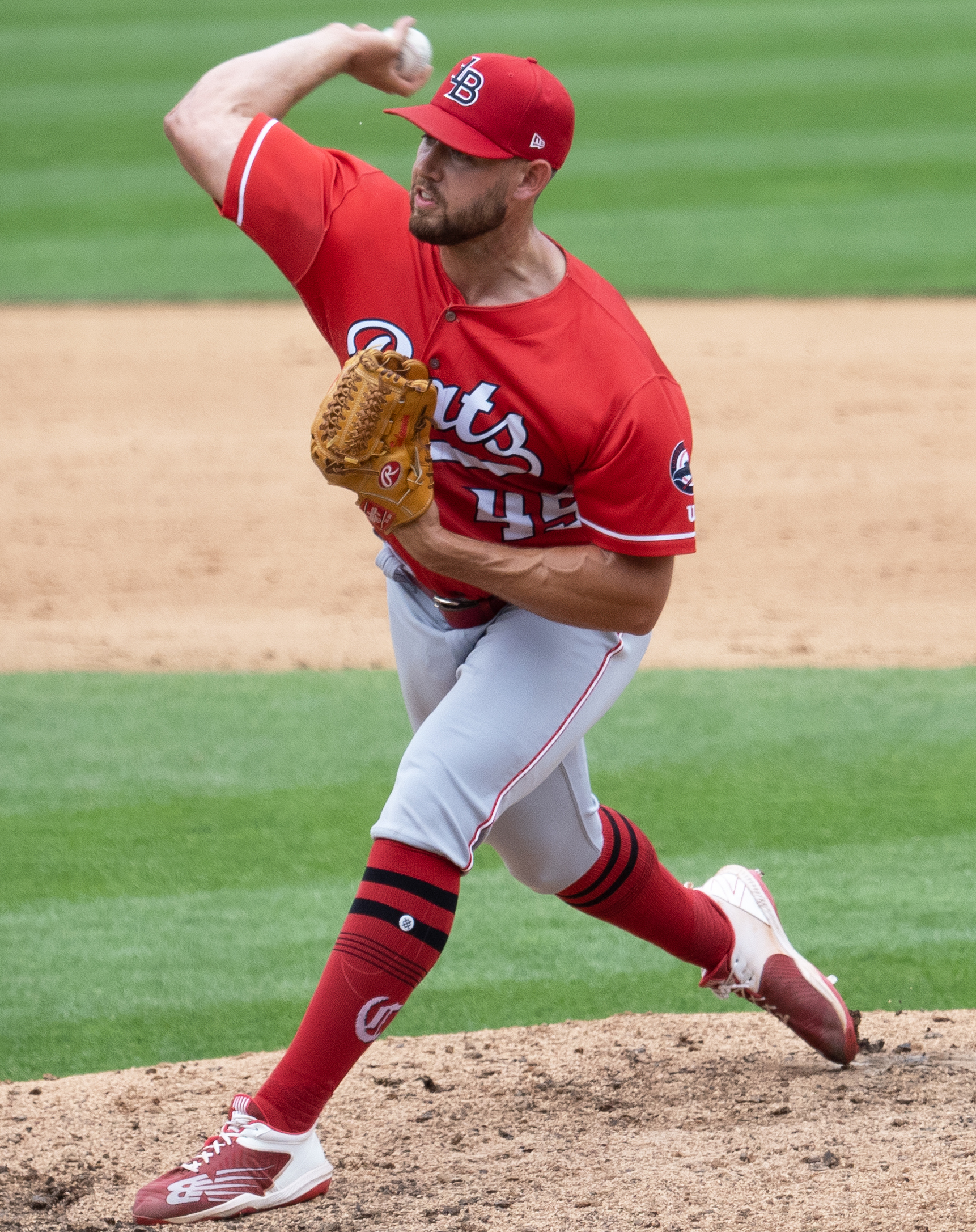
- Solomon with the Louisville Bats in 2022
- Pitcher
- Born: June 10, 1997 (age 29); Millville, Pennsylvania, U.S.
- Batted: Right Threw: Right

MLB debut
- May 7, 2022, for the Cincinnati Reds

Last MLB appearance
- July 7, 2022, for the Cincinnati Reds

MLB statistics
- Win–loss record: 0–0
- Earned run average: 10.80
- Strikeouts: 9
- Stats at Baseball Reference

Teams
- Cincinnati Reds (2022)

Jared Solomon (born June 10, 1997) is an American former professional baseball pitcher. He has previously played in Major League Baseball (MLB) for the Cincinnati Reds.

== Amateur career ==
Solomon attended Millville Area Junior Senior High School in Millville, Pennsylvania and played college baseball at Alderson Broaddus University and Lackawanna College. He was drafted by the Cincinnati Reds in the 11th round of the 2017 Major League Baseball draft.

== Professional career ==
=== Cincinnati Reds ===
Solomon signed with the Reds and made his professional debut with the Arizona League Reds, going 2–2 with a 4.26 ERA over 38 innings. In 2018, he pitched with both the Billings Mustangs and the Dayton Dragons, starting 15 games between both teams and compiling a 4–3 record and 3.34 ERA over 72 2/3 innings. Solomon split the 2019 season between Dayton and the Daytona Tortugas and went 3–11 with a 3.98 ERA and 111 strikeouts over 26 starts and 115 1/3 innings. Solomon did not play in a game in 2020 due to the cancellation of the minor league season because of the COVID-19 pandemic. On November 20, 2020, the Reds added Solomon to their 40-man roster to protect him from the Rule 5 draft. He did not play a game in 2021 after undergoing Tommy John surgery.

On May 7, 2022, Solomon was promoted to the major leagues for the first time to serve as the 27th man in a doubleheader against the Pittsburgh Pirates. He made his MLB debut that night, throwing a scoreless inning in relief. In 9 appearances during his rookie campaign, he struggled to a 10.80 ERA with 9 strikeouts in 8 1/3 innings pitched. On November 15, Solomon was designated for assignment by Cincinnati. On November 18, he was non tendered and became a free agent.

On December 6, 2022, Solomon re–signed with the Reds on a minor league contract. Solomon began the 2023 season with the Triple–A Louisville Bats. In 26 games, he struggled immensely to a 10.29 ERA with 22 strikeouts in 28.0 innings pitched. On July 14, 2023, Solomon was released by the Reds organization.

=== Minnesota Twins ===
On January 17, 2024, Solomon signed a minor league contract with the Minnesota Twins. In 30 outings for the Double–A Wichita Wind Surge, he struggled to a 7.76 ERA with 33 strikeouts and 4 saves across 31 1/3 innings pitched. Solomon was released by the Twins organization on July 31.
