= Eduardo Salazar =

Venezuelan baseball player (born 1998)

Free agent
- Pitcher
- Born: May 5, 1998 (age 28); Cumaná, Venezuela
- Bats: Right Throws: Right

MLB debut
- May 24, 2023, for the Cincinnati Reds

MLB statistics (through 2025 season)
- Win–loss record: 1–2
- Earned run average: 5.99
- Strikeouts: 55
- Stats at Baseball Reference

Teams
- Cincinnati Reds (2023); Los Angeles Dodgers (2024); Washington Nationals (2024–2025)

Eduardo José Salazar (born May 5, 1998) is a Venezuelan professional baseball pitcher who is a free agent. He has previously played in Major League Baseball (MLB) for the Cincinnati Reds, Los Angeles Dodgers, and Washington Nationals.

== Career ==
=== Cincinnati Reds ===
On March 4, 2017, Salazar signed with the Cincinnati Reds as an international free agent and he made his professional debut that year with the Dominican Summer League Reds. He spent the 2018 season split between the rookie-level Arizona League Reds and Greeneville Reds, posting a cumulative 5.83 ERA with 26 strikeouts in 29.1 innings pitched. Salazar spent 2019 with the High-A Dayton Dragons, recording a 6–3 record and 3.81 ERA with 81 strikeouts in 106 1/3 innings of work across 35 games (11 starts).

Salazar did not play in a game in 2020 due to the cancellation of the minor league season because of the COVID-19 pandemic and spent the majority of the 2021 season with High-A Dayton, making one start for the Double-A Chattanooga Lookouts at the end of the year. In 19 starts for Dayton, he pitched to a 4–5 record and 3.49 ERA with 107 strikeouts in 98 innings of work.

Salazar spent the entire 2022 season with Chattanooga, starting 27 games and registering a 6–10 record and 5.16 ERA with 111 strikeouts in 125 2/3 innings pitched. He was converted from a starter to a relief pitcher for the 2023 season, which he began with Double-A Chattanooga before being promoted to the Triple-A Louisville Bats after posting a minuscule 0.68 ERA in nine appearances. In three games with Louisville, Salazar allowed no runs with one walk and three strikeouts in 4 1/3 innings pitched.

On May 24, 2023, Salazar was selected to the 40-man roster and promoted to the major leagues for the first time and made his debut with one inning of work against the St. Louis Cardinals, allowing one run on two hits and a walk while striking out one. His first MLB strikeout was of Nolan Gorman. In eight appearances for the Reds, he had a 8.03 ERA with five strikeouts in 12 1/3 innings pitched. On August 11, he was designated for assignment and removed from the 40-man roster. After finishing the season with Louisville, he became a free agent on November 6.

=== Los Angeles Dodgers ===
On November 16, 2023, Salazar signed a minor league contract with the Los Angeles Dodgers and was assigned to the Triple–A Oklahoma City Baseball Club to start the season. The Dodgers selected his contract to the major league roster on April 16, 2024, however he was optioned back to the minors the following day without appearing in a game. He rejoined the majors and pitched two innings in a game on May 15, giving up three hits and two walks but no earned runs. He also made seven starts for Oklahoma City, with a 5.61 ERA. The Dodgers designated him for assignment on May 20.

=== Seattle Mariners ===
On May 23, 2024, Salazar was claimed off waivers by the Seattle Mariners. In four games for the Triple–A Tacoma Rainiers, he compiled a 5.40 ERA with one strikeout across 3 1/3 innings. On June 9, Salazar was designated for assignment by Seattle.

=== Washington Nationals ===
On June 13, 2024, Salazar was claimed off waivers by the Washington Nationals. He made 25 appearances for Washington, posting an 0-1 record and 2.96 ERA with 24 strikeouts across 27 1/3 innings pitched.

Salazar made 30 appearances for the Nationals in 2025, but struggled to an 0-1 record and 8.38 ERA with 23 strikeouts over 29 innings of work. On October 29, 2025, Salazar was removed from the 40-man roster and sent outright to the Triple-A Rochester Red Wings; he subsequently rejected the assignment in favor of free agency.

=== Minnesota Twins ===
On February 3, 2026, Salazar signed a minor league contract with the Minnesota Twins. He made 19 appearances (two starts) split between the rookie–level Florida Complex League Twins, Sinhle–A Fort Myers Mighty Mussels, and Triple–A St. Paul Saints, accumulating a 1–1 record and 4.10 ERA with 20 strikeouts across 26 1/3 innings pitched. Salazar was released by the Twins organization on August 13.
