= Jake Wong =

American baseball player (born 1996)

- Pitcher
- Born: September 3, 1996 (age 30); Chandler, Arizona, U.S.
- Batted: Right Threw: Right

MLB debut
- June 26, 2023, for the Cincinnati Reds

Last MLB appearance
- June 26, 2023, for the Cincinnati Reds

MLB statistics
- Win–loss record: 0–0
- Earned run average: 9.00
- Strikeouts: 0
- Stats at Baseball Reference

Teams
- Cincinnati Reds (2023)

Jacob Ryne Wong (born September 3, 1996) is an American former professional baseball pitcher. He played one game in Major League Baseball (MLB) for the Cincinnati Reds in 2023.

== Amateur career ==
Wong attended Hamilton High School in Chandler, Arizona. In 2015, his senior year, he pitched to a 2.86 earned run average (ERA). Undrafted in the 2015 Major League Baseball draft, he enrolled at Grand Canyon University where he played college baseball.

In 2016, Wong's freshman season at Grand Canyon, he appeared in 18 games (making six starts) in which he went 2–3 with a 4.28 ERA. That summer, he played in the West Coast League for the Corvallis Knights. As a sophomore in 2017, he moved into the starting rotation and was GCU's Friday night starter, going 5–3 with a 4.00 ERA over 14 starts. After the 2017 season, he played in the Cape Cod Baseball League with the Orleans Firebirds, pitching to a 2.58 ERA over 24 1/3 innings. In 2018, Wong's junior year, he started 15 games and pitched to a 9–3 record and a 2.81 ERA, striking out 88 batters over 89 2/3 innings. After the season, he was selected by the San Francisco Giants in the third round of the 2018 Major League Baseball draft.

== Professional career ==
=== San Francisco Giants ===
Wong signed with the Giants and made his professional debut with the Salem-Keizer Volcanoes, compiling a 2.30 ERA over 11 starts. In 2019, he began the year with the Augusta GreenJackets with whom he went 2–1 with a 1.99 ERA over eight starts being promoted to the San Jose Giants in May. Over 15 starts with San Jose, he pitched to a 3–2 record with a 4.98 ERA, striking out 67 over 72 1/3 innings.

Wong did not play a minor league game in 2020 due to the cancellation of the minor league season caused by the COVID-19 pandemic. He missed the whole 2021 season after undergoing surgery. He was assigned to the Eugene Emeralds of the High-A Northwest League for the 2022 season. Over 25 games (17 starts), he went 6–5 with one save (his first in the minors) and a 4.52 ERA and 108 strikeouts over 97 2/3 innings.

=== Cincinnati Reds ===
On December 13, 2022, the Giants traded Wong to the Cincinnati Reds to complete a trade made in the Rule 5 draft a few days prior. To open the 2023 season, he was assigned to the Chattanooga Lookouts of the Double-A Southern League. After 6 appearances, Wong was promoted to the Triple–A Louisville Bats, where he struggled to a 10.13 ERA across 11 appearances. On June 26, 2023, Wong was selected to the 40-man roster and promoted to the major leagues for the first time. Wong made his major league debut that same day, pitching three innings and allowing three runs on six hits and three walks in a 10–3 loss against the Baltimore Orioles. He was designated for assignment by Cincinnati the next day following the promotion of Alec Mills. He cleared waivers and was sent outright to Louisville on July 1.

=== Chicago Cubs ===
On May 1, 2024, Wong signed a minor league contract with the Chicago Cubs. Wong made one scoreless appearance for the Double–A Tennessee Smokies before he was released by the Cubs organization on June 12.
