= 2026 Cincinnati Reds season =

2026 Cincinnati Reds
- League: National League
- Division: Central
- Ballpark: Great American Ball Park
- City: Cincinnati
- Record: 75–87 (.463)
- Divisional place: 5th
- Owner: Bob Castellini
- General manager: Nick Krall
- Manager: Terry Francona
- Television: MLB Local Media
- Radio: WLW (700 AM); Reds Radio Network
- Stats: ESPN.com; Baseball Reference

The 2026 Cincinnati Reds season was the 157th season for the franchise in Major League Baseball, and their 24th at Great American Ball Park in Cincinnati. Coming off a playoff appearance the previous year, they started the season off strong at 20–11. However, the Reds struggled with a 55–76 record from that point forward, being eliminated from playoff contention on September 14 and finishing with a 75–87 record, their worst since 2022. The Cincinnati Reds became the seventh team eliminated from 2026 playoff contention, despite clinching the playoffs one season prior.

First baseman Sal Stewart in his first season for the Reds, led all rookies in RBI’s with 112, as well as also having 32 home runs. Stewart had the best offensive season compared to all over National League rookies.

On September 11, the Reds suffered their worst shutout loss in franchise history, losing 20–0 to the eventual World Series champions, the Milwaukee Brewers, which is also their worst overall loss since they were defeated 22–1 by the Philadelphia Phillies in 2009.

On May 14, the Reds offense reached its peak after a 15–1 win against the Washington Nationals where designated hitter JJ Bleday hit two home-runs with six runs batted in.

Despite their dismal season, one of the few bright spots for the Reds was Elly De La Cruz achieving 30 home runs and 30 stolen bases in a single season. Cruz became the fourth Reds player to meet that milestone after Eric Davis, Barry Larkin, and Brandon Phillips previously did so.

== Standings ==
=== National League Central ===
NL Central
| Team | W | L | Pct. | GB | Home | Road |
|---|---|---|---|---|---|---|
| Milwaukee Brewers | 103 | 59 | .636 | — | 55‍–‍26 | 48‍–‍33 |
| Chicago Cubs | 89 | 73 | .549 | 14 | 46‍–‍35 | 43‍–‍38 |
| Pittsburgh Pirates | 82 | 80 | .506 | 21 | 44‍–‍37 | 38‍–‍43 |
| St. Louis Cardinals | 77 | 85 | .475 | 26 | 38‍–‍43 | 39‍–‍42 |
| Cincinnati Reds | 75 | 87 | .463 | 28 | 38‍–‍43 | 37‍–‍44 |

=== National League Wild Card ===
Division leaders
| Team | W | L | Pct. |
|---|---|---|---|
| Milwaukee Brewers | 103 | 59 | .636 |
| Los Angeles Dodgers | 100 | 62 | .617 |
| Atlanta Braves | 94 | 68 | .580 |

Wild Card teams (Top 3 teams qualify for postseason)
| Team | W | L | Pct. | GB |
|---|---|---|---|---|
| San Diego Padres | 91 | 71 | .562 | +3 |
| Chicago Cubs | 89 | 73 | .549 | +1 |
| Philadelphia Phillies | 88 | 74 | .543 | — |
| Arizona Diamondbacks | 86 | 76 | .531 | 2 |
| Pittsburgh Pirates | 82 | 80 | .506 | 6 |
| Miami Marlins | 80 | 82 | .494 | 8 |
| St. Louis Cardinals | 77 | 85 | .475 | 11 |
| Washington Nationals | 77 | 85 | .475 | 11 |
| Cincinnati Reds | 75 | 87 | .463 | 13 |
| New York Mets | 74 | 88 | .457 | 14 |
| San Francisco Giants | 65 | 97 | .401 | 23 |
| Colorado Rockies | 58 | 104 | .358 | 30 |

=== Record vs. opponents ===
2026 National League record Source: MLB Standings Grid – 2026
| Team | AZ | ATL | CHC | CIN | COL | LAD | MIA | MIL | NYM | PHI | PIT | SD | SF | STL | WSH | AL |
|---|---|---|---|---|---|---|---|---|---|---|---|---|---|---|---|---|
| Arizona | — | 4–3 | 2–4 | 4–2 | 9–4 | 7–6 | 1–5 | 2–4 | 4–2 | 3–3 | 3–3 | 6–7 | 10–3 | 5–2 | 2–4 | 24–24 |
| Atlanta | 3–4 | — | 3–3 | 3–3 | 6–0 | 5–1 | 9–4 | 3–3 | 6–7 | 9–4 | 5–1 | 3–4 | 1–5 | 2–4 | 9–4 | 27–21 |
| Chicago | 4–2 | 3–3 | — | 9–4 | 3–3 | 4–2 | 3–3 | 4–9 | 7–0 | 6–1 | 7–6 | 5–1 | 3–3 | 6–7 | 3–3 | 22–26 |
| Cincinnati | 2–4 | 3–3 | 4–9 | — | 4–2 | 1–6 | 3–4 | 4–9 | 4–2 | 3–3 | 6–7 | 3–3 | 3–3 | 5–8 | 1–5 | 29–19 |
| Colorado | 4–9 | 0–6 | 3–3 | 2–4 | — | 3–10 | 2–5 | 1–5 | 4–2 | 2–4 | 3–3 | 2–11 | 7–6 | 2–4 | 3–4 | 20–28 |
| Los Angeles | 6–7 | 1–5 | 2–4 | 6–1 | 10–3 | — | 2–4 | 3–4 | 5–1 | 4–2 | 5–1 | 8–5 | 9–4 | 2–4 | 6–0 | 31–17 |
| Miami | 5–1 | 4–9 | 3–3 | 4–3 | 5–2 | 4–2 | — | 1–5 | 6–7 | 5–8 | 4–2 | 0–6 | 4–2 | 4–2 | 9–4 | 22–26 |
| Milwaukee | 4–2 | 3–3 | 9–4 | 9–4 | 5–1 | 4–3 | 5–1 | — | 4–2 | 4–2 | 6–7 | 2–4 | 3–4 | 11–2 | 2–4 | 32–16 |
| New York | 2–4 | 7–6 | 0–7 | 2–4 | 2–4 | 1–5 | 7–6 | 2–4 | — | 6–7 | 4–2 | 4–2 | 5–2 | 2–4 | 7–6 | 23–25 |
| Philadelphia | 3–3 | 4–9 | 1–6 | 3–3 | 4–2 | 2–4 | 8–5 | 2–4 | 7–6 | — | 5–2 | 6–0 | 4–2 | 4–2 | 9–4 | 26–22 |
| Pittsburgh | 3–3 | 1–5 | 6–7 | 7–6 | 3–3 | 1–5 | 2–4 | 7–6 | 2–4 | 2–5 | — | 3–3 | 3–3 | 6–7 | 4–3 | 32–16 |
| San Diego | 7–6 | 4–3 | 1–5 | 3–3 | 11–2 | 5–8 | 6–0 | 4–2 | 2–4 | 0–6 | 3–3 | — | 9–4 | 3–4 | 4–2 | 29–19 |
| San Francisco | 3–10 | 5–1 | 3–3 | 3–3 | 6–7 | 4–9 | 2–4 | 4–3 | 2–5 | 2–4 | 3–3 | 4–9 | — | 5–1 | 3–3 | 16–32 |
| St. Louis | 2–5 | 4–2 | 7–6 | 8–5 | 4–2 | 4–2 | 2–4 | 2–11 | 4–2 | 2–4 | 7–6 | 4–3 | 1–5 | — | 3–3 | 23–25 |
| Washington | 4–2 | 4–9 | 3–3 | 5–1 | 4–3 | 0–6 | 4–9 | 4–2 | 6–7 | 4–9 | 3–4 | 2–4 | 3–3 | 3–3 | — | 28–20 |

Updated with the results of all games through September 27, 2026.

== Off-season ==
=== Clock outside stadium ===
On March 24, Joey Votto donated a custom-built Reds-themed clock outside of Great American Ball Park to the Reds and the City of Cincinnati, just days before Opening Day.

== Regular season ==
=== Opening day lineup ===
| Order | No. | Player | Pos. |
Batters
| 1 | 29 | TJ Friedl | CF |
| 2 | 9 | Matt McLain | 2B |
| 3 | 44 | Elly De La Cruz | SS |
| 4 | 27 | Sal Stewart | 1B |
| 5 | 28 | Eugenio Suárez | DH |
| 6 | 7 | Spencer Steer | LF |
| 7 | 37 | Tyler Stephenson | C |
| 8 | 4 | Noelvi Marte | RF |
| 9 | 3 | Ke'Bryan Hayes | 3B |
Starting pitcher
| — | 41 | Andrew Abbott | |
Source: Baseball Reference

== Transactions ==
=== April ===
- April 1: Designated LHP Nick Lodolo on a rehab assignment to Daytona Tortugas.
- April 2: Signed free agent C Mikel Nieblas to minor league contract.
- April 8: Selected the contract of C P.J. Higgins from Louisville Bats. Placed C Jose Trevino on the 10-day injured list retroactive to April 5, 2026. Designated 1B Christian Encarnacion-Strand for assignment.
- April 10: Recalled RHP Kyle Nicolas from Louisville Bats. Optioned RHP José Franco to Louisville Bats.
- April 13: Optioned OF Noelvi Marte to Louisville Bats

== Game log ==
Legend
| Reds Win | Reds Loss | Game postponed | Eliminated from playoff race |

2026 Game Log: 75–87 (Home: 38–43; Away: 37–44)
March/April: 20–11 (Home: 10–8; Road: 10–3)

| # | Date | Opponent | Score | Win | Loss | Save | Attendance | Record | Streak |
|---|---|---|---|---|---|---|---|---|---|
| 1 | March 26 | Red Sox | 0–3 | Crochet (1–0) | Johnson (0–1) | Chapman (1) | 43,897 | 0–1 | L1 |
| 2 | March 28 | Red Sox | 6–5 (11) | Phillips (1–0) | Slaten (0–1) | — | 38,298 | 1–1 | W1 |
| 3 | March 29 | Red Sox | 3–2 | Burke (1–0) | Weissert (0–1) | Pagán (1) | 27,084 | 2–1 | W2 |
| 4 | March 30 | Pirates | 2–0 | Burns (1–0) | Ashcraft (0–1) | Phillips (1) | 13,626 | 3–1 | W3 |
| 5 | March 31 | Pirates | 3–8 | Ramírez (1–0) | Williamson (0–1) | — | 22,390 | 3–2 | L1 |
| 6 | April 1 | Pirates | 3–8 | Skenes (1–1) | Abbott (0–1) | — | 15,007 | 3–3 | L2 |
| 7 | April 3 | @ Rangers | 5–3 | Santillan (1–0) | Martin (0–1) | Pagán (2) | 37,635 | 4–3 | W1 |
| 8 | April 4 | @ Rangers | 2–0 | Lowder (1–0) | Rocker (0–1) | Pagán (3) | 36,393 | 5–3 | W2 |
| 9 | April 5 | @ Rangers | 2–1 | Moll (1–0) | Garcia (0–1) | Burke (1) | 31,561 | 6–3 | W3 |
| 10 | April 6 | @ Marlins | 2–0 | Williamson (1–1) | Junk (0–1) | Pagán (4) | 10,934 | 7–3 | W4 |
| 11 | April 7 | @ Marlins | 6–3 (10) | Pagán (1–0) | Faucher (1–1) | — | 8,318 | 8–3 | W5 |
| 12 | April 8 | @ Marlins | 4–7 | Pérez (1–1) | Singer (0–1) | Petersen (1) | 8,639 | 8–4 | L1 |
| 13 | April 9 | @ Marlins | 1–8 | Meyer (1–0) | Lowder (1–1) | Phillips (1) | 9,578 | 8–5 | L2 |
| 14 | April 10 | Angels | 2–10 | Kochanowicz (2–0) | Burns (1–1) | — | 22,357 | 8–6 | L3 |
| 15 | April 11 | Angels | 7–3 | Johnson (1–1) | Klassen (0–1) | — | 32,554 | 9–6 | W1 |
| 16 | April 12 | Angels | 6–9 | Soriano (4–0) | Abbott (0–2) | — | 20,311 | 9–7 | L1 |
| 17 | April 14 | Giants | 2–1 | Singer (1–1) | Ray (2–2) | Pagán (5) | 20,690 | 10–7 | W1 |
| 18 | April 15 | Giants | 8–3 | Lowder (2–1) | Mahle (0–3) | — | 13,822 | 11–7 | W2 |
| 19 | April 16 | Giants | 0–3 | Roupp (3–1) | Burke (1–1) | Miller (1) | 16,898 | 11–8 | L1 |
| 20 | April 17 | @ Twins | 2–1 | Williamson (2–1) | Ryan (2–2) | Pagán (6) | 31,220 | 12–8 | W1 |
| 21 | April 18 | @ Twins | 5–4 | Nicolas (1–0) | Sands (0–1) | Santillan (1) | 20,198 | 13–8 | W2 |
| 22 | April 19 | @ Twins | 7–4 (10) | Pagán (2–0) | Acton (1–1) | Ashcraft (1) | 19,422 | 14–8 | W3 |
| 23 | April 20 | @ Rays | 6–1 | Lowder (3–1) | Scholtens (1–1) | — | 15,962 | 15–8 | W4 |
| 24 | April 21 | @ Rays | 12–6 | Burns (2–1) | Matz (3–1) | — | 14,749 | 16–8 | W5 |
| 25 | April 22 | @ Rays | 1–6 | Martinez (1–1) | Williamson (2–2) | — | 15,546 | 16–9 | L1 |
| 26 | April 24 | Tigers | 9–8 | Ashcraft (1–0) | Jansen (0–1) | — | 23,879 | 17–9 | W1 |
| 27 | April 25 | Tigers | 9–2 | Singer (2–1) | Flaherty (0–2) | — | 35,315 | 18–9 | W2 |
| 28 | April 26 | Tigers | 3–8 | Hurter (3–0) | Moll (1–1) | — | 31,377 | 18–10 | L1 |
| 29 | April 28 | Rockies | 7–2 | Burns (3–1) | Freeland (1–2) | — | 24,152 | 19–10 | W1 |
| 30 | April 29 | Rockies | 2–13 | Sugano (3–1) | Williamson (2–3) | — | 17,823 | 19–11 | L1 |
| 31 | April 30 | Rockies | 6–4 | Abbott (1–2) | Lorenzen (2–3) | — | 17,211 | 20–11 | W1 |

May: 10–17 (Home: 5–6; Road: 5–11)

| # | Date | Opponent | Score | Win | Loss | Save | Attendance | Record | Streak |
|---|---|---|---|---|---|---|---|---|---|
| 32 | May 1 | @ Pirates | 1–9 | Keller (3–1) | Singer (2–2) | — | 13,442 | 20–12 | L1 |
| 33 | May 2 | @ Pirates | 7–17 | Mlodzinski (2–2) | Lowder (3–2) | — | 23,763 | 20–13 | L2 |
| 34 | May 3 | @ Pirates | 0–1 | Soto (3–0) | Santillan (1–1) | — | 16,642 | 20–14 | L3 |
| 35 | May 4 | @ Cubs | 4–5 | Rolison (2–0) | Pagán (2–1) | — | 32,997 | 20–15 | L4 |
| 36 | May 5 | @ Cubs | 2–3 (10) | Rolison (3–0) | Moll (1–2) | — | 34,777 | 20–16 | L5 |
| 37 | May 6 | @ Cubs | 6–7 (10) | Thornton (1–0) | Burke (1–2) | — | 34,143 | 20–17 | L6 |
| 38 | May 7 | @ Cubs | 3–8 | Imanaga (4–2) | Lowder (3–3) | Palencia (2) | 30,441 | 20–18 | L7 |
| 39 | May 8 | Astros | 0–10 | Burrows (2–4) | Lodolo (0–1) | — | 24,347 | 20–19 | L8 |
| 40 | May 9 | Astros | 3–1 | Burns (4–1) | Arrighetti (4–1) | Johnson (1) | 35,688 | 21–19 | W1 |
| 41 | May 10 | Astros | 5–0 | Abbott (2–2) | Teng (1–3) | — | 23,980 | 22–19 | W2 |
| 42 | May 12 | Nationals | 4–10 | Lord (2–0) | Singer (2–3) | — | 23,715 | 22–20 | L1 |
| 43 | May 13 | Nationals | 7–8 (10) | Varland (1–1) | Santillan (1–2) | Poulin (2) | 17,312 | 22–21 | L2 |
| 44 | May 14 | Nationals | 15–1 | Burns (5–1) | Griffin (4–2) | — | 22,651 | 23–21 | W1 |
| 45 | May 15 | @ Guardians | 7–6 | Abbott (3–2) | Bibee (0–6) | Antone (1) | 27,903 | 24–21 | W2 |
| 46 | May 16 | @ Guardians | 4–7 | Sabrowski (2–1) | Moll (1–3) | Smith (14) | 33,331 | 24–22 | L1 |
| 47 | May 17 | @ Guardians | 3–10 | Williams (6–3) | Singer (2–4) | — | 27,388 | 24–23 | L2 |
| 48 | May 18 | @ Phillies | 4–5 | Kerkering (2–0) | Ashcraft (1–1) | Durán (8) | 40,065 | 24–24 | L3 |
| 49 | May 19 | @ Phillies | 4–1 | Burns (6–1) | Luzardo (3–4) | Santillan (2) | 37,527 | 25–24 | W1 |
| 50 | May 20 | @ Phillies | 9–4 | Abbott (4–2) | Nola (2–4) | — | 38,222 | 26–24 | W2 |
| ― | May 22 | Cardinals | Postponed (rain) (Makeup date: May 23) | | | | | | |
| 51 | May 23 (1) | Cardinals | 1–8 | Pallante (5–4) | Paddack (0–6) | — | 19,927 | 26–25 | L1 |
| 52 | May 23 (2) | Cardinals | 7–6 (11) | Johnson (2–1) | O'Brien (3–2) | — | 31,144 | 27–25 | W1 |
| ― | May 24 | Cardinals | Postponed (rain) (Makeup date: August 17) | | | | | | |
| 53 | May 25 | @ Mets | 7–2 | Lodolo (1–1) | McLean (2–4) | — | 36,734 | 28–25 | W2 |
| 54 | May 26 | @ Mets | 7–2 | Burns (7–1) | Peterson (3–5) | — | 36,848 | 29–25 | W3 |
| 55 | May 27 | @ Mets | 2–4 | Tong (1–0) | Abbott (4–3) | Williams (8) | 33,453 | 29–26 | L1 |
| 56 | May 29 | Braves | 3–8 | Fuentes (4–0) | Paddack (0–7) | — | 29,996 | 29–27 | L2 |
| 57 | May 30 | Braves | 2–5 | Pérez (3–3) | Singer (2–5) | Iglesias (10) | 36,848 | 29–28 | L3 |
| 58 | May 31 | Braves | 6–4 | Lodolo (2–1) | Strider (3–1) | Moll (1) | 31,084 | 30–28 | W1 |

June: 9–17 (Home: 4–8; Road: 5–9)

| # | Date | Opponent | Score | Win | Loss | Save | Attendance | Record | Streak |
|---|---|---|---|---|---|---|---|---|---|
| 59 | June 1 | Royals | 2–9 | Avila (1–2) | Richardson (0–1) | — | 19,409 | 30–29 | L1 |
| 60 | June 2 | Royals | 4–3 (10) | Burke (2–2) | Schreiber (0–3) | — | 25,824 | 31–29 | W1 |
| 61 | June 3 | Royals | 2–5 | Lynch IV (2–0) | Santillan (1–3) | Lange (1) | 15,959 | 31–30 | L1 |
| 62 | June 5 | @ Cardinals | 3–10 | Dobbins (1–0) | Singer (2–6) | — | 30,058 | 31–31 | L2 |
| 63 | June 6 | @ Cardinals | 5–6 | Soriano (3–0) | Moll (1–4) | O'Brien (16) | 26,904 | 31–32 | L3 |
| 64 | June 7 | @ Cardinals | 3–5 | Stanek (2–0) | Moll (1–5) | O'Brien (17) | 31,335 | 31–33 | L4 |
| 65 | June 8 | @ Padres | 2–6 | Morejón (5–1) | Abbott (4–4) | — | 37,223 | 31–34 | L5 |
| 66 | June 9 | @ Padres | 5–3 (11) | Antone (1–0) | Matsui (0–1) | Maxwell (1) | 40,469 | 32–34 | W1 |
| 67 | June 10 | @ Padres | 4–5 | Peralta (1–0) | Petty (0–1) | — | 37,393 | 32–35 | L1 |
| 68 | June 12 | Diamondbacks | 2–5 | Ginkel (2–2) | Burke (2–3) | Sewald (16) | 29,803 | 32–36 | L2 |
| 69 | June 13 | Diamondbacks | 2–1 | Petty (1–1) | Morillo (1–3) | Santillan (3) | 27,563 | 33–36 | W1 |
| 70 | June 14 | Diamondbacks | 3–5 | Morillo (2–3) | Maxwell (0–1) | Sewald (17) | 22,946 | 33–37 | L1 |
| 71 | June 15 | Mets | 12–0 | Burns (8–1) | Myers (0–2) | — | 19,853 | 34–37 | W1 |
| 72 | June 16 | Mets | 5–3 | Singer (3–6) | Senga (0–5) | Santillan (4) | 28,710 | 35–37 | W2 |
| 73 | June 17 | Mets | 1–9 | McLean (4–4) | Lodolo (2–2) | — | 27,207 | 35–38 | L1 |
| 74 | June 19 | @ Yankees | 0–5 | Schlitter (8–3) | Lowder (3–4) | — | 42,420 | 35–39 | L2 |
| 75 | June 20 | @ Yankees | 10–2 | Abbott (5–4) | Warren (7–2) | — | 46,089 | 36–39 | W1 |
| 76 | June 21 | @ Yankees | 4–1 | Burns (9–1) | Rodríguez (0–2) | Santillan (5) | 46,046 | 37–39 | W2 |
| 77 | June 22 | Brewers | 1–2 (10) | Megill (2–2) | Santillan (1–4) | Kuhnel (5) | 17,971 | 37–40 | L1 |
| 78 | June 23 | Brewers | 0–2 | Sproat (2–4) | Garcia (0–1) | Megill (10) | 28,302 | 37–41 | L2 |
| 79 | June 24 | Brewers | 5–6 | Patrick (5–3) | Lowder (3–5) | Kuhnel (6) | 22,981 | 37–42 | L3 |
| 80 | June 26 | @ Pirates | 6–4 | Burke (3–3) | Montgomery (2–3) | Ferguson (1) | 25,186 | 38–42 | W1 |
| 81 | June 27 | @ Pirates | 9–7 | Ferguson (1–0) | Soto (4–2) | Petty (1) | 30,077 | 39–42 | W2 |
| 82 | June 28 | @ Pirates | 4–9 | Keller (6–5) | Singer (3–7) | — | 24,023 | 39–43 | L1 |
| 83 | June 29 | @ Brewers | 3–5 | Ashby (11–1) | Moll (1–6) | Megill (11) | 28,059 | 39–44 | L2 |
| 84 | June 30 | @ Brewers | 2–7 | Sproat (3–4) | Lowder (3–6) | — | 28,081 | 39–45 | L3 |

July: 13–12 (Home: 6–8; Road: 7–4)

| # | Date | Opponent | Score | Win | Loss | Save | Attendance | Record | Streak |
|---|---|---|---|---|---|---|---|---|---|
| 85 | July 1 | @ Brewers | 2–4 | Ashby (12–1) | Burke (3–4) | Megill (12) | 30,068 | 39–46 | L4 |
| 86 | July 2 | @ Brewers | 7–2 | Burns (10–1) | Misiorowski (9–4) | — | 41,390 | 40–46 | W1 |
| 87 | July 3 | Orioles | 0–3 | Rogers (6–7) | Singer (3–8) | Wells (1) | 22,157 | 40–47 | L1 |
| 88 | July 4 | Orioles | 5–8 | Young (7–2) | Greene (0–1) | Wells (2) | 33,047 | 40–48 | L2 |
| 89 | July 5 | Orioles | 3–2 | Lodolo (3–2) | Bradish (5–9) | Pagán (7) | 17,601 | 41–48 | W1 |
| 90 | July 7 | Phillies | 1–4 | Wheeler (9–1) | Abbott (5–5) | Durán (22) | 31,204 | 41–49 | L1 |
| 91 | July 8 | Phillies | 11–5 | Burns (11–1) | Rangel (0–1) | — | 33,089 | 42–49 | W1 |
| 92 | July 9 | Phillies | 0–1 | Luzardo (8–4) | Singer (3–9) | Durán (23) | 19,777 | 42–50 | L1 |
| 93 | July 10 | Cubs | 4–0 | Greene (1–1) | Imanaga (5–8) | — | 30,878 | 43–50 | W1 |
| 94 | July 11 | Cubs | 3–5 | Pomeranz (2–3) | Garcia (0–2) | Thornton (3) | 34,199 | 43–51 | L1 |
| 95 | July 12 | Cubs | 4–8 | Boyd (5–1) | Petty (1–2) | Webb (5) | 29,200 | 43–52 | L2 |
| ASG | July 14 | AL @ NL | 4–0 | Cease (1–0) | Sánchez (0–1) | ― | 43,916 | — | — |
| 96 | July 17 | @ Rockies | 7–2 | Singer (4–9) | Hughes (0–1) | — | 40,356 | 44–52 | W1 |
| 97 | July 18 | @ Rockies | 3–10 | Sugano (9–4) | Lowder (3–7) | — | 31,585 | 44–53 | L1 |
| 98 | July 19 | @ Rockies | 9–6 | Greene (2–1) | Feltner (3–4) | — | 20,158 | 45–53 | W1 |
| 99 | July 20 | @ Mariners | 0–8 | Kirby (8–8) | Abbott (5–6) | — | 35,929 | 45–54 | L1 |
| 100 | July 21 | @ Mariners | 4–2 | Burns (12–1) | Castillo (3–9) | Pagán (8) | 35,239 | 46–54 | W1 |
| 101 | July 22 | @ Mariners | 5–3 | Singer (5–9) | Bazardo (3–3) | Pagán (9) | 38,236 | 47–54 | W2 |
| 102 | July 24 | @ Cardinals | 4–2 | Garcia (1–2) | Soriano (3–3) | Pagán (10) | 29,900 | 48–54 | W3 |
| 103 | July 25 | @ Cardinals | 0–7 | Pallante (11–6) | Greene (2–2) | — | 33,975 | 48–55 | L1 |
| 104 | July 26 | @ Cardinals | 5–3 (10) | Burke (4–4) | Svanson (2–3) | Garcia (1) | 22,852 | 49–55 | W1 |
| ― | July 27 | Guardians | Postponed (rain) (Makeup date: July 28) | | | | | | |
| 105 | July 28 (1) | Guardians | 5–6 | Holderman (6–2) | Moll (1–7) | Smith (30) | 16,866 | 49–56 | L1 |
| 106 | July 28 (2) | Guardians | 2–0 | Franco (1–0) | Williams (10–6) | Pagán (11) | 26,928 | 50–56 | W1 |
| 107 | July 29 | Guardians | 1–6 | Sabrowski (4–2) | Singer (5–10) | — | 17,084 | 50–57 | L1 |
| 108 | July 30 | Pirates | 3–2 | Pagán (3–1) | Soto (5–3) | — | 25,532 | 51–57 | W1 |
| 109 | July 31 | Pirates | 8–7 | Pagán (4–1) | Dotel (1–4) | — | 30,618 | 52–57 | W2 |

August: 13–16 (Home: 7–7; Road: 6–9)

| # | Date | Opponent | Score | Win | Loss | Save | Attendance | Record | Streak |
|---|---|---|---|---|---|---|---|---|---|
| 110 | August 1 | Pirates | 1–4 | Ashcraft (11–4) | Abbott (5–7) | Soto (14) | 27,616 | 52–58 | L1 |
| 111 | August 2 | Pirates | 10–2 | Burns (13–1) | Keller (6–8) | — | 23,878 | 53–58 | W1 |
| 112 | August 4 | Athletics | 5–4 | Garcia (2–2) | Harris (3–1) | Pagán (12) | 21,714 | 54–58 | W2 |
| 113 | August 5 | Athletics | 3–2 | Lowder (4–7) | Juenger (0–1) | Pagán (13) | 16,544 | 55–58 | W3 |
| 114 | August 6 | Athletics | 6–5 | Abbott (6–7) | Barnett (1–2) | Burke (2) | 17,617 | 56–58 | W4 |
| 115 | August 7 | @ Nationals | 3–5 | Cavalli (9–5) | Garcia (2–3) | Beeter (12) | 26,065 | 56–59 | L1 |
| 116 | August 8 | @ Nationals | 2–8 | Beeter (5–3) | Burns (13–2) | — | 32,602 | 56–60 | L2 |
| 117 | August 9 | @ Nationals | 1–7 | Dion (1–0) | Singer (5–11) | — | 21,375 | 56–61 | L3 |
| 118 | August 11 | @ White Sox | 5–4 (10) | Burke (5–4) | Newcomb (1–3) | Pagán (14) | 38,113 | 57–61 | W1 |
| 119 | August 12 | @ White Sox | 0–5 | Castillo (4–9) | Lowder (4–8) | — | 24,099 | 57–62 | L1 |
| 120 | August 13 | @ White Sox | 9–8 | Antone (2–0) | Fedde (6–8) | Garcia (2) | 17,013 | 58–62 | W1 |
| 121 | August 14 | Marlins | 1–0 | Burns (14–2) | Alcántara (13–7) | Pagán (15) | 21,232 | 59–62 | W2 |
| 122 | August 15 | Marlins | 4–8 | Zuber (2–1) | Antone (2–1) | — | 38,302 | 59–63 | L1 |
| 123 | August 16 | Marlins | 1–7 | Ekness (1–1) | Antone (2–2) | — | 24,092 | 59–64 | L2 |
| 124 | August 17 (1) | Cardinals | 1–2 | Gastélum (3–2) | Emanuel (0–1) | O'Brien (31) | 20,434 | 59–65 | L3 |
| 125 | August 17 (2) | Cardinals | 6–5 (10) | Pagán (5–1) | Bruihl (0–1) | — | 12,166 | 60–65 | W1 |
| 126 | August 18 | Cardinals | 0–3 | Leahy (10–4) | Abbott (6–8) | O'Brien (32) | 21,757 | 60–66 | L1 |
| 127 | August 19 | Cardinals | 5–4 | Moll (2–7) | Liberatore (5–11) | Pagán (16) | 16,097 | 61–66 | W1 |
| 128 | August 20 | Cardinals | 9–10 | Strzelecki (1–1) | Burke (5–5) | O'Brien (33) | 15,361 | 61–67 | L1 |
| 129 | August 21 | @ Diamondbacks | 0–9 | Rodríguez (13–4) | Lodolo (3–3) | — | 32,087 | 61–68 | L2 |
| 130 | August 22 | @ Diamondbacks | 11–5 | Lowder (5–8) | Soroka (8–4) | — | 36,405 | 62–68 | W1 |
| 131 | August 23 | @ Diamondbacks | 3–5 | Loáisiga (5–3) | Abbott (6–9) | Ginkel (2) | 28,433 | 62–69 | L1 |
| 132 | August 24 | @ Giants | 0–5 | Foley (1–1) | Burns (14–3) | — | 31,123 | 62–70 | L2 |
| 133 | August 25 | @ Giants | 1–3 | Molina (1–0) | Singer (5–12) | Seymour (1) | 27,207 | 62–71 | L3 |
| 134 | August 26 | @ Giants | 10–9 | Santillan (2–4) | Smith (0–5) | Pagán (17) | 24,130 | 63–71 | W1 |
| 135 | August 28 | @ Cubs | 10–8 | Lowder (6–8) | Thornton (5–5) | Pagán (18) | 39,036 | 64–71 | W2 |
| 136 | August 29 | @ Cubs | 5–17 | Gausman (8–11) | Abbott (6–10) | — | 39,597 | 64–72 | L1 |
| 137 | August 30 | @ Cubs | 7–5 | Burns (15–3) | Imanaga (8–10) | Pagán (19) | 36,308 | 65–72 | W1 |
| 138 | August 31 | Padres | 0–5 | King (9–9) | Singer (5–13) | — | 16,162 | 65–73 | L1 |

September: 10–14 (Home: 6–6; Road: 4–8)

| # | Date | Opponent | Score | Win | Loss | Save | Attendance | Record | Streak |
|---|---|---|---|---|---|---|---|---|---|
| 139 | September 1 | Padres | 4–3 | Burke (6–5) | Morejón (9–3) | Pagán (20) | 19,376 | 66–73 | W1 |
| 140 | September 2 | Padres | 7–3 | Williamson (3–3) | Mize (5–9) | — | 14,632 | 67–73 | W2 |
| 141 | September 4 | Brewers | 7–10 | Patrick (8–4) | Lowder (6–9) | Megill (26) | 30,450 | 67–74 | L1 |
| 142 | September 5 | Brewers | 5–3 | Santillan (3–4) | Ashby (13–3) | Pagán (21) | 32,778 | 68–74 | W1 |
| 143 | September 6 | Brewers | 12–8 | Singer (6–13) | Senzatela (10–5) | Pagán (22) | 23,310 | 69–74 | W2 |
| 144 | September 7 | @ Dodgers | 3–6 | Sheehan (5–8) | Williamson (3–4) | Phillips (1) | 50,293 | 69–75 | L1 |
| 145 | September 8 | @ Dodgers | 2–3 | Skubal (9–7) | Lodolo (3–4) | Scott (22) | 48,439 | 69–76 | L2 |
| 146 | September 9 | @ Dodgers | 1–14 | Yamamoto (13–8) | Lowder (6–10) | — | 45,252 | 69–77 | L3 |
| 147 | September 11 | @ Brewers | 0–20 | May (7–9) | Abbott (6–11) | Stallings (1) | 41,879 | 69–78 | L4 |
| 148 | September 12 | @ Brewers | 9–13 | Patrick (9–4) | Singer (6–14) | — | 41,167 | 69–79 | L5 |
| 149 | September 13 | @ Brewers | 4–3 | Williamson (4–4) | Uribe (5–3) | Pagán (23) | 40,559 | 70–79 | W1 |
| 150 | September 14 | Dodgers | 1–4 | Skubal (10–7) | Lodolo (3–5) | — | 22,807 | 70–80 | L1 |
| 151 | September 15 | Dodgers | 0–4 | Yamamoto (14–8) | Lowder (6–11) | — | 25,341 | 70–81 | L2 |
| 152 | September 16 | Dodgers | 6–2 | Antone (3–2) | Halvorsen (1–2) | — | 20,151 | 71–81 | W1 |
| 153 | September 17 | Dodgers | 2–8 | Knack (1–0) | Singer (6–15) | — | 24,169 | 71–82 | L1 |
| 154 | September 18 | Cubs | 6–4 | Aguiar (1–0) | Holmes (6–8) | Pagán (24) | 31,678 | 72–82 | W1 |
| 155 | September 19 | Cubs | 2–5 | Boyd (9–5) | Lodolo (3–6) | Rolison (3) | 37,031 | 72–83 | L1 |
| 156 | September 20 | Cubs | 1–9 | Peterson (9–8) | Lowder (6–12) | — | 28,917 | 72–84 | L2 |
| 157 | September 22 | @ Braves | 4–0 | Williamson (5–4) | Ritchie (1–4) | — | 38,214 | 73–84 | W1 |
| 158 | September 23 | @ Braves | 2–3 (10) | Suter (3–2) | Mey (0–1) | — | 39,680 | 73–85 | L1 |
| 159 | September 24 | @ Braves | 7–6 | Phillips (2–0) | Smith-Shawver (0–3) | Pagán (25) | 40,165 | 74–85 | W1 |
| 160 | September 25 | @ Blue Jays | 5–6 | Fluharty (7–1) | Mey (0–2) | Varland (35) | 42,535 | 74–86 | L1 |
| 161 | September 26 | @ Blue Jays | 5–1 | Lowder (7–12) | Yesavage (5–6) | — | 42,482 | 75–86 | W1 |
| 162 | September 27 | @ Blue Jays | 1–5 | Scherzer (4–9) | Williamson (5–5) | — | 42,131 | 75–87 | L1 |

Source: ESPN

== Roster ==
2026 Cincinnati Reds
Roster
| Pitchers: 41 Andrew Abbott; 39 Julian Aguiar; 70 Tejay Antone; 23 Graham Ashcraft; 49 Brock Burke; 26 Chase Burns; 67 Kent Emanuel; 46 Caleb Ferguson; 74 José Franco; 57 Julian Garcia; 21 Hunter Greene; 52 Pierce Johnson; 58 Brandon Leibrandt; 40 Nick Lodolo; 25 Rhett Lowder; 97 Ron Marinaccio; 58 Yunior Marte; 78 Zach Maxwell; 62 Zach McCambley; 47 Luis Mey; 50 Sam Moll; 62 Kyle Nicolas; 56 Chris Paddack; 15 Emilio Pagán; 61 Chase Petty; 34 Connor Phillips; 72 Lyon Richardson; 64 Tony Santillan; 51 Brady Singer; 68 Carson Spiers; 35 Jose Trevino; 55 Brandon Williamson | Catchers: 60 Will Banfield; 65 P. J. Higgins; 37 Tyler Stephenson; 35 Jose Trevino; Infielders: 1 Edwin Arroyo; 46 Juan Brito; 16 Oswaldo Cabrera; 44 Elly De La Cruz; 3 Ke'Bryan Hayes; 63 Ivan Johnson; 31 Nathaniel Lowe; 9 Matt McLain; 7 Spencer Steer; 27 Sal Stewart; 28 Eugenio Suárez; 48 Michael Toglia | Outfielders: 30 Will Benson; 22 JJ Bleday; 59 Blake Dunn; 29 TJ Friedl; 57 Rece Hinds; 38 Carlos Jorge; 4 Noelvi Marte; 17 Dane Myers; 43 Héctor Rodríguez | Manager: 77 Terry Francona; Coaches: 92 Kyle Arnsberg (assistant coach); 45 Freddie Benavides (bench coach/field coordinator); 54 Collin Cowgill (first base); 91 Jose Duarte (bullpen catcher); 99 Willie Harris (third base); 36 Derek Johnson (director of pitching); 95 James Keller (bullpen catcher); 96 Simon Mathews (assistant pitching); 75 Mike Napoli (staff assistant); 93 Alex Pelaez (assistant hitting); 94 Will Remillard (assistant hitting); 90 Matt Tracy (bullpen); 76 Chris Valaika (hitting) |

== Player stats ==
| = Indicates team leader |

| = Indicates league leader |

=== Batting ===
Note: G = Games played; AB = At bats; R = Runs scored; H = Hits; 2B = Doubles; 3B = Triples; HR = Home runs; RBI = Runs batted in; SB = Stolen bases; BB = Walks; AVG = Batting average; SLG = Slugging average

| Player | G | AB | R | H | 2B | 3B | HR | RBI | SB | BB | AVG | SLG |
|---|---|---|---|---|---|---|---|---|---|---|---|---|
| Sal Stewart | 162 | 623 | 87 | 164 | 25 | 0 | 32 | 111 | 15 | 63 | .263 | .457 |
| Elly De La Cruz | 143 | 559 | 99 | 158 | 30 | 5 | 30 | 79 | 30 | 72 | .283 | .515 |
| JJ Bleday | 133 | 466 | 61 | 101 | 17 | 2 | 24 | 58 | 6 | 72 | .217 | .416 |
| Matt McLain | 134 | 437 | 59 | 81 | 18 | 1 | 15 | 40 | 20 | 48 | .185 | .334 |
| Eugenio Suárez | 125 | 434 | 50 | 92 | 18 | 0 | 26 | 74 | 1 | 52 | .212 | .433 |
| Tyler Stephenson | 130 | 411 | 41 | 99 | 22 | 0 | 15 | 54 | 0 | 49 | .241 | .404 |
| Spencer Steer | 98 | 340 | 54 | 81 | 14 | 0 | 16 | 40 | 3 | 35 | .238 | .421 |
| Dane Myers | 117 | 292 | 39 | 75 | 11 | 0 | 8 | 27 | 10 | 37 | .257 | .377 |
| Nathaniel Lowe | 83 | 248 | 26 | 66 | 17 | 0 | 12 | 37 | 0 | 28 | .266 | .480 |
| TJ Friedl | 91 | 239 | 20 | 41 | 6 | 1 | 4 | 13 | 5 | 22 | .172 | .255 |
| Ke'Bryan Hayes | 94 | 227 | 19 | 32 | 2 | 1 | 5 | 9 | 1 | 13 | .141 | .225 |
| Noelvi Marte | 63 | 190 | 19 | 36 | 7 | 0 | 6 | 15 | 7 | 10 | .189 | .321 |
| Jose Trevino | 48 | 152 | 12 | 33 | 3 | 0 | 5 | 19 | 0 | 1 | .217 | .336 |
| Edwin Arroyo | 50 | 148 | 14 | 33 | 4 | 1 | 0 | 5 | 1 | 6 | .223 | .264 |
| Héctor Rodríguez | 41 | 144 | 16 | 33 | 4 | 2 | 6 | 17 | 0 | 7 | .229 | .410 |
| Blake Dunn | 38 | 142 | 20 | 40 | 7 | 1 | 2 | 7 | 6 | 10 | .282 | .387 |
| Will Benson | 51 | 96 | 11 | 18 | 3 | 1 | 3 | 6 | 1 | 16 | .188 | .333 |
| Juan Brito | 18 | 55 | 6 | 17 | 2 | 0 | 3 | 11 | 1 | 3 | .309 | .509 |
| Carlos Jorge | 18 | 46 | 5 | 10 | 0 | 1 | 1 | 2 | 2 | 4 | .217 | .326 |
| Rece Hinds | 12 | 33 | 2 | 4 | 3 | 0 | 0 | 5 | 0 | 1 | .121 | .212 |
| Michael Toglia | 10 | 26 | 2 | 3 | 2 | 0 | 0 | 1 | 0 | 2 | .115 | .192 |
| P.J. Higgins | 13 | 26 | 1 | 6 | 1 | 0 | 0 | 4 | 0 | 2 | .231 | .269 |
| Will Banfield | 11 | 20 | 1 | 3 | 1 | 0 | 0 | 1 | 0 | 0 | .150 | .200 |
| Ivan Johnson | 16 | 16 | 0 | 1 | 0 | 0 | 0 | 0 | 2 | 3 | .063 | .063 |
| Oswaldo Cabrera | 4 | 13 | 2 | 4 | 2 | 0 | 0 | 0 | 1 | 1 | .308 | .462 |
| Totals | 162 | 5383 | 666 | 1231 | 219 | 16 | 213 | 635 | 112 | 557 | .229 | .394 |

=== Pitching ===
Note: W = Wins; L = Losses; ERA = Earned run average; G = Games pitched; GS = Games started; SV = Saves; IP = Innings pitched; H = Hits allowed; R = Runs allowed; ER = Earned runs allowed; BB = Walks allowed; SO = Strikeouts

| Player | W | L | ERA | G | GS | SV | IP | H | R | ER | BB | SO |
|---|---|---|---|---|---|---|---|---|---|---|---|---|
| Andrew Abbott | 6 | 11 | 4.61 | 32 | 32 | 0 | 166.0 | 165 | 91 | 85 | 76 | 131 |
| Brady Singer | 6 | 15 | 5.85 | 31 | 31 | 0 | 157.0 | 188 | 107 | 102 | 62 | 126 |
| Chase Burns | 15 | 3 | 2.86 | 29 | 29 | 0 | 154.1 | 124 | 54 | 49 | 56 | 185 |
| Rhett Lowder | 7 | 12 | 5.74 | 29 | 26 | 0 | 133.1 | 147 | 88 | 85 | 56 | 103 |
| Nick Lodolo | 3 | 6 | 4.97 | 21 | 21 | 0 | 108.2 | 115 | 60 | 60 | 46 | 83 |
| Brock Burke | 6 | 5 | 2.30 | 77 | 0 | 2 | 74.1 | 54 | 32 | 19 | 40 | 74 |
| Sam Moll | 2 | 7 | 4.79 | 65 | 0 | 1 | 56.1 | 54 | 36 | 30 | 30 | 56 |
| Tejay Antone | 3 | 2 | 3.11 | 58 | 0 | 1 | 55.0 | 43 | 22 | 19 | 17 | 57 |
| Brandon Williamson | 5 | 5 | 5.30 | 12 | 9 | 0 | 52.2 | 47 | 34 | 31 | 30 | 36 |
| Pierce Johnson | 2 | 1 | 4.62 | 56 | 0 | 1 | 48.2 | 47 | 25 | 25 | 19 | 42 |
| Julian Garcia | 2 | 3 | 3.13 | 33 | 0 | 2 | 46.0 | 29 | 17 | 16 | 19 | 41 |
| Emilio Pagán | 5 | 1 | 3.38 | 45 | 0 | 25 | 42.2 | 33 | 16 | 16 | 11 | 45 |
| Tony Santillan | 3 | 4 | 6.42 | 44 | 0 | 5 | 40.2 | 40 | 31 | 29 | 28 | 36 |
| Graham Ashcraft | 1 | 1 | 4.08 | 35 | 0 | 1 | 35.1 | 27 | 17 | 16 | 24 | 40 |
| Luis Mey | 0 | 2 | 6.23 | 29 | 0 | 0 | 34.2 | 35 | 26 | 24 | 22 | 50 |
| Chase Petty | 1 | 2 | 4.83 | 16 | 3 | 1 | 31.2 | 31 | 19 | 17 | 9 | 15 |
| Connor Phillips | 2 | 0 | 5.40 | 27 | 0 | 1 | 30.0 | 23 | 19 | 18 | 31 | 29 |
| Hunter Greene | 2 | 2 | 6.83 | 5 | 5 | 0 | 27.2 | 29 | 22 | 21 | 9 | 33 |
| Caleb Ferguson | 1 | 0 | 4.01 | 26 | 1 | 1 | 24.2 | 26 | 11 | 11 | 11 | 22 |
| Chris Paddack | 0 | 2 | 6.04 | 6 | 3 | 0 | 22.1 | 28 | 15 | 15 | 9 | 12 |
| José Franco | 1 | 0 | 4.43 | 10 | 0 | 0 | 20.1 | 19 | 11 | 10 | 16 | 15 |
| Zach McCambley | 0 | 0 | 4.05 | 11 | 0 | 0 | 13.1 | 13 | 6 | 6 | 6 | 14 |
| Zach Maxwell | 0 | 1 | 8.31 | 12 | 0 | 1 | 13.0 | 18 | 12 | 12 | 10 | 12 |
| Jose Trevino | 0 | 0 | 15.00 | 7 | 0 | 0 | 9.0 | 22 | 15 | 15 | 1 | 3 |
| Kyle Nicolas | 1 | 0 | 8.59 | 7 | 0 | 0 | 7.1 | 8 | 7 | 7 | 13 | 7 |
| Carson Spiers | 0 | 0 | 7.50 | 2 | 0 | 0 | 6.0 | 6 | 5 | 5 | 0 | 6 |
| Brandon Leibrandt | 0 | 0 | 7.50 | 1 | 0 | 0 | 6.0 | 10 | 5 | 5 | 3 | 3 |
| Ron Marinaccio | 0 | 0 | 16.88 | 4 | 0 | 0 | 5.1 | 6 | 10 | 10 | 7 | 6 |
| Kent Emanuel | 0 | 1 | 3.60 | 1 | 1 | 0 | 5.0 | 5 | 2 | 2 | 3 | 4 |
| Julian Aguiar | 1 | 0 | 6.00 | 1 | 0 | 0 | 3.0 | 4 | 2 | 2 | 1 | 2 |
| Lyon Richardson | 0 | 1 | 27.00 | 2 | 1 | 0 | 1.2 | 2 | 5 | 5 | 2 | 3 |
| P.J. Higgins | 0 | 0 | 0.00 | 1 | 0 | 0 | 1.0 | 0 | 0 | 0 | 0 | 1 |
| Yunior Marte | 0 | 0 | 108.00 | 1 | 0 | 0 | 0.1 | 3 | 4 | 4 | 1 | 1 |
| Totals | 75 | 87 | 4.83 | 162 | 162 | 42 | 1433.1 | 1401 | 826 | 770 | 668 | 1293 |

== Farm system ==
| Level | Team | League | Manager |
|---|---|---|---|
| Triple-A | Louisville Bats | International League | Pat Kelly |
| Double-A | Chattanooga Lookouts | Southern League | Jose Moreno |
| High-A | Dayton Dragons | Midwest League | Julio Morillo |
| Single-A | Daytona Tortugas | Florida State League | Ricky Gutiérrez |
| Rookie | ACL Reds | Arizona Complex League | Gary Van Tol |
| Foreign Rookie | DSL Reds | Dominican Summer League | Jose Montilla |
