= P. J. Higgins =

American baseball player (born 1993)

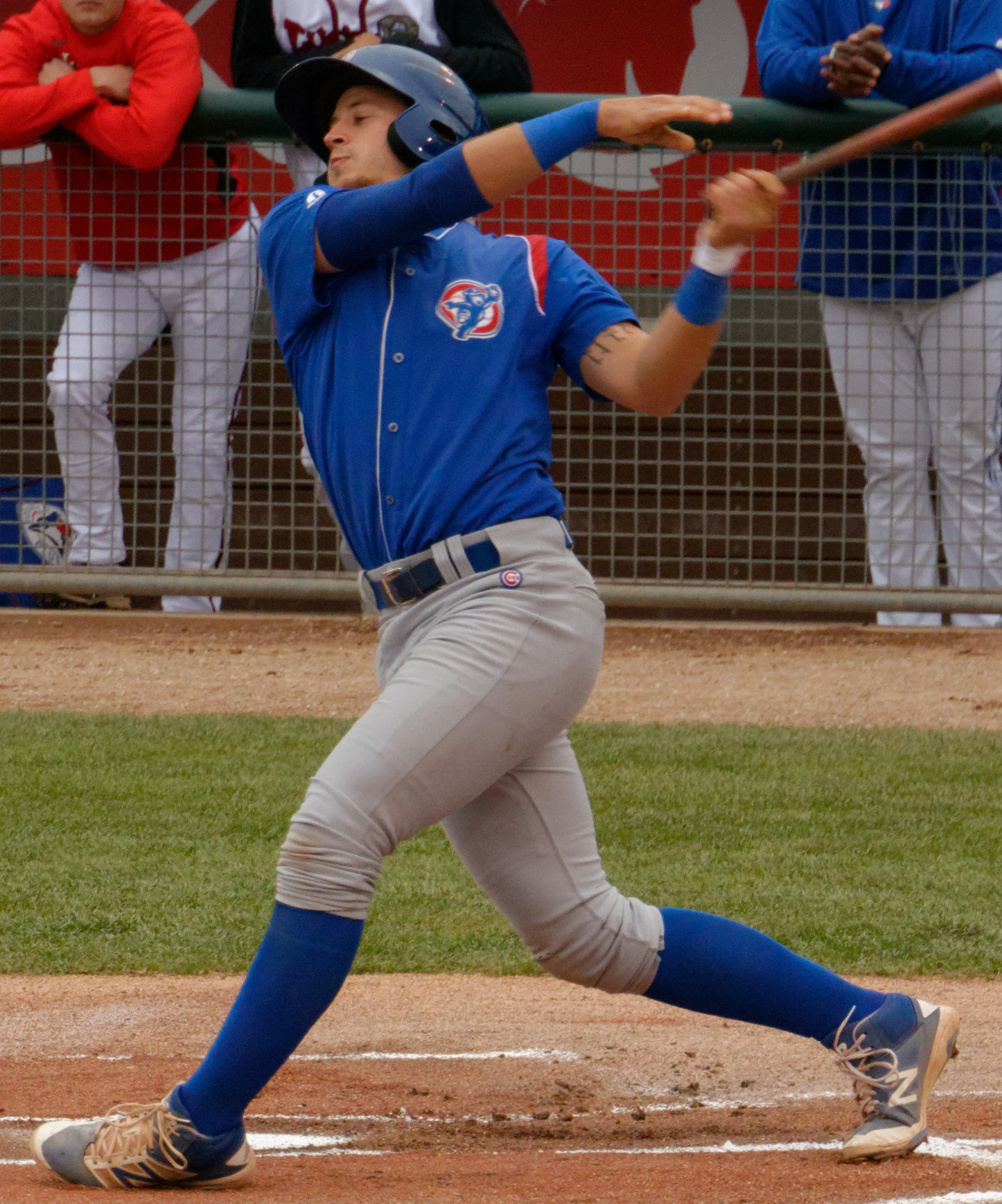
- Higgins with the South Bend Cubs in 2016

Free agent
- Catcher / First baseman
- Born: May 10, 1993 (age 33); Wallingford, Connecticut, U.S.
- Bats: Right Throws: Right

MLB debut
- May 19, 2021, for the Chicago Cubs

MLB statistics (through 2026 season)
- Batting average: .212
- Home runs: 6
- Runs batted in: 34
- Stats at Baseball Reference

Teams
- Chicago Cubs (2021–2022); Cincinnati Reds (2026)

Patrick James Higgins (born May 10, 1993) is an American professional baseball catcher and first baseman who is a free agent. He has previously played in Major League Baseball (MLB) for the Chicago Cubs and Cincinnati Reds. He was drafted by the Cubs in the 12th round of the 2015 MLB draft out of Old Dominion University.

== Early life ==
Higgins was born and raised in Connecticut, growing up in Wallingford. Higgins attended Lyman Hall High School, and graduated in 2011. He attended Old Dominion University where he played NCAA Division 1 baseball for the Old Dominion Monarchs.

== Career ==
=== Chicago Cubs ===
The Chicago Cubs selected Higgins in 12th round, 353rd overall, of the 2015 Major League Baseball draft. He made his professional debut with the rookie–level Arizona League Cubs in 2015, and also played for the Low-A Eugene Emeralds, accumulating a batting line of .299/.351/.445. In 2016, Higgins played for the Single-A South Bend Cubs, slashing .283/.389/.355 with 40 RBI. The next year, he played for the High-A Myrtle Beach Pelicans, batting .237/.327/.298 with a career-high four home runs. He split the 2018 season between Myrtle Beach and the Double-A Tennessee Smokies, posting a .271/.353/.366 line with four home runs and a career-high in RBI, with 52. In 2019, Higgins split the season between the Triple-A Iowa Cubs and Tennessee, batting .281/.349/.416 with career-highs in home runs (10) and RBI (57).

Higgins did not play in a game in 2020 due to the cancellation of the minor league season because of the COVID-19 pandemic. He was assigned to Triple-A Iowa to begin the 2021 season.

On May 19, 2021, Higgins was selected to the 40–man roster and promoted to the major leagues for the first time. He made his MLB debut that night against the Washington Nationals as a replacement for Jason Heyward, going hitless in three at-bats. On June 3, Higgins recorded his first major league hit, a single off of San Diego Padres pitcher Austin Adams. On June 16, he was placed on the 60-day injured list with a right forearm strain. He was later diagnosed with a partially torn UCL that required Tommy John surgery, ending his regular season. On November 5, Higgins was outrighted off of the 40-man roster. Higgins re-signed with the Cubs on a minor league deal on November 19.

Higgins was assigned to Triple-A Iowa to begin the 2022 season. On May 22, 2022, Higgins was selected to the 40-man and active rosters. On July 10, Higgins hit his first career grand slam off of Los Angeles Dodgers starting pitcher Julio Urías. In 2022 with the Cubs he batted .229/.310/.383. On December 29, Higgins was designated for assignment. He cleared waivers and was sent outright to Triple-A Iowa on January 6, 2023. Higgins rejected the outright assignment and elected free agency on January 9.

=== Arizona Diamondbacks ===
On January 12, 2023, Higgins signed a minor league contract with the Arizona Diamondbacks organization. In 58 games for the Triple–A Reno Aces, Higgins batted .317/.407/.473 with six home runs and 46 RBI.

=== Chicago Cubs (second stint) ===
On July 16, 2023, Higgins was traded to the Chicago Cubs in exchange for cash considerations. In 32 games for the Triple–A Iowa Cubs, he batted .285/.333/.480 with five home runs and 21 RBI. Higgins elected free agency following the season on November 6.

=== Cincinnati Reds ===
On November 13, 2023, Higgins signed a minor league contract with the Cincinnati Reds that included an invitation to spring training. He played in 134 games for the Triple-A Louisville Bats, slashing .259/.320/.385 with 11 home runs and 68 RBI. Higgins elected free agency following the season on November 4, 2024.

On January 28, 2025, Higgins re-signed with the Reds organization on a new minor league contract. He made 111 appearances for Triple-A Louisville, batting .240/.300/.345 with seven home runs and 42 RBI. Higgins elected free agency following the season on November 6.

On December 17, 2025, Higgins re-signed with the Reds on another minor league contract. He was assigned to Triple-A Louisville to begin the regular season. On April 8, 2026, the Reds selected Higgins' contract, adding him to their active roster. On April 10, Higgins entered a 10–2 blowout loss to the Los Angeles Angels in relief of Kyle Nicolas in the ninth inning; in the appearance, he recorded a strikeout against Angels outfielder Josh Lowe. He made five appearances for Cincinnati, going 2-for-10 (.200) with one RBI and one walk. On May 13, Higgins was designated for assignment following the signing of Chris Paddack. He cleared waivers and was sent outright to Louisville the following day. On May 17, Higgins was added back to Cincinnati's active roster. Across 13 total games for the team, he went 6-for-26 (.231) with four RBI and two walks. On June 18, Higgins was removed from the 40-man roster and sent outright to Triple-A Louisville. He elected free agency on September 29.
