= Connor Scott =

American baseball player (born 1999)

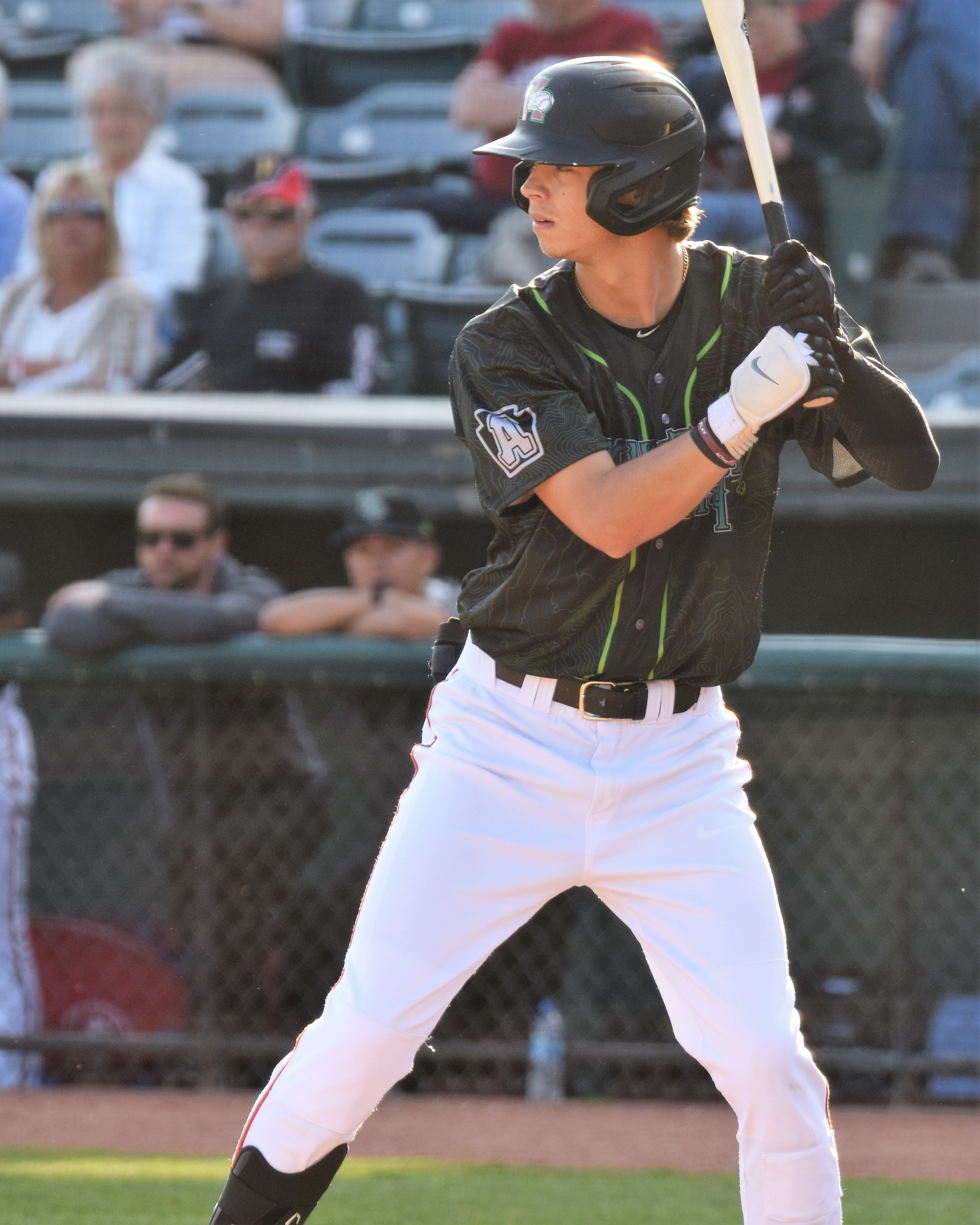
- Scott with the Altoona Curve in 2022

Free agent
- Outfielder
- Born: October 8, 1999 (age 26); Tampa, Florida, U.S.
- Bats: Left Throws: Left
- Stats at Baseball Reference

Connor Bryant Scott (born October 8, 1999) is an American professional baseball outfielder who is a free agent. He was drafted by the Miami Marlins in the first round of the 2018 MLB draft.

== Amateur career ==
Scott attended Henry B. Plant High School in Tampa, Florida, where he played four years of varsity baseball. In 2018, his senior year, he struggled with a hamstring injury, forcing him to miss three weeks. Over 20 games, he batted .526 with five home runs, along with pitching to a 3–0 win–loss record and a 2.13 earned run average in 23 innings. He committed to attend the University of Florida to play college baseball for the Florida Gators.

== Professional career ==
=== Miami Marlins ===
The Miami Marlins selected Scott in the first round, with the 13th overall pick, in the 2018 Major League Baseball draft. He signed for a $4,038,200 signing bonus, rather than attend Florida, and made his professional debut with the Gulf Coast Marlins of the Rookie-level Gulf Coast League (GCL). After 27 games in the GCL, he was promoted to the Greensboro Grasshoppers of the Single–A South Atlantic League. In 50 games between the two teams, Scott batted .218 with one home run and 13 runs batted in.

Scott began 2019 with the Clinton LumberKings of the Single–A Midwest League. After slashing .251/.311/.368 with four home runs, 36 RBI, and 21 stolen bases over 95 games, he was promoted to the Jupiter Hammerheads of the High–A Florida State League, with whom he finished the year, batting .235 with one home run over 27 games. For the 2021 season, he was assigned to the Beloit Snappers of the High-A Central, slashing .276/.333/.446 with ten home runs, 46 RBI, and 14 stolen bases over 96 games.

=== Pittsburgh Pirates ===
On November 29, 2021, the Marlins traded Scott, Zach Thompson, and Kyle Nicolas to the Pittsburgh Pirates in exchange for Jacob Stallings. He was assigned to the Altoona Curve of the Double-A Eastern League for the 2022 season. Over 109 games, Scott slashed .247/.308/.389 with seven home runs, 49 RBI, and 25 doubles.

Scott returned to Altoona in 2023, playing in 74 contests and hitting .196/.263/.315 with three home runs, 37 RBI, and 10 stolen bases. Scott spent the 2024 campaign back with Altoona, batting .161/.207/.185 with five RBI across 24 contests. He was released by the Pirates organization on June 27, 2024.

=== Milwaukee Brewers ===
On July 2, 2024, Scott signed a minor league contract with the Milwaukee Brewers. In 41 appearances for the Double-A Biloxi Shuckers, he slashed .243/.305/.421 with four home runs and 24 RBI. Scott elected free agency following the season on November 4.

=== Kansas City Royals ===
On January 15, 2025, Scott signed a minor league contract with the Kansas City Royals. On May 2, he was placed on the full-season injured list, ruling him out for the remainder of the season. Scott made eight appearances for the Double-A Northwest Arkansas Naturals prior to his injury, going 9-for-27 (.333) with six RBI. Scott elected free agency following the season on November 6.

On January 12, 2026, Scott re-signed with the Royals organization on a minor league contract. He played in 88 games for Northwest Arkansas and hit .231 with 11 home runs and 50 RBI. On September 14, Scott was released by the Royals.
