= Justin Dunn =

American baseball player (born 1995)

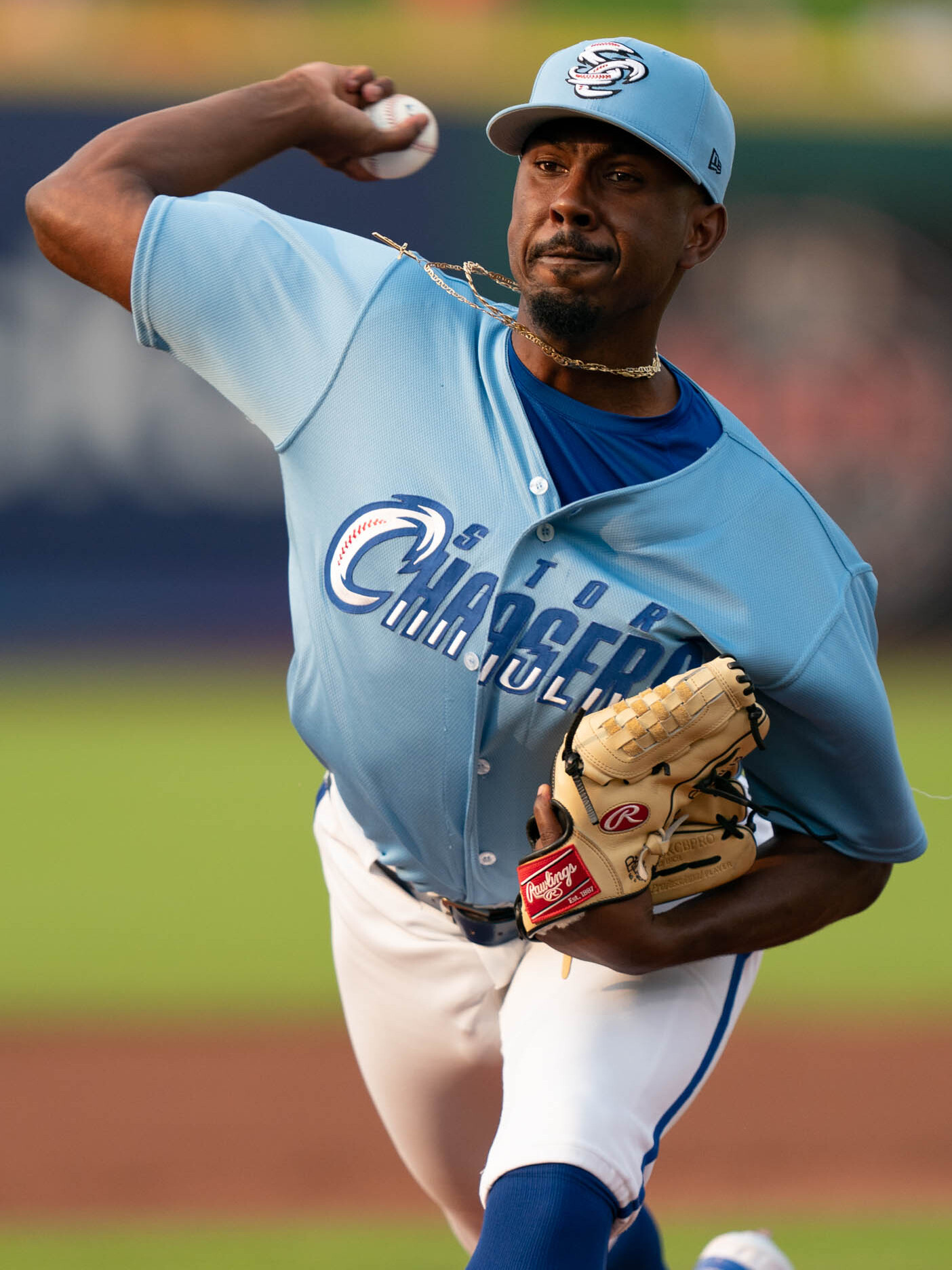
- Dunn with the Omaha Storm Chasers in 2025

High Point Rockers – No. 18
- Pitcher
- Born: September 22, 1995 (age 31); Freeport, New York, U.S.
- Bats: Right Throws: Right

MLB debut
- September 12, 2019, for the Seattle Mariners

MLB statistics (through 2022 season)
- Win–loss record: 6–7
- Earned run average: 4.44
- Strikeouts: 113
- Stats at Baseball Reference

Teams
- Seattle Mariners (2019–2021); Cincinnati Reds (2022)

Justin Warren Dunn (born September 22, 1995) is an American professional baseball pitcher for the High Point Rockers of the Atlantic League of Professional Baseball. He has previously played in Major League Baseball (MLB) for the Seattle Mariners and Cincinnati Reds. Dunn played college baseball at Boston College and was selected by the New York Mets with the 19th overall pick in the first round of the 2016 MLB draft.

== Amateur career ==
Dunn was born in Freeport, New York to Ed, a grant administrator, and Donna, a health company recruiter. As an eighth grader, he was noticed playing at a showcase with the Boys Club of New York by the baseball coach of The Gunnery, a boarding school in Washington, Connecticut. At 13 years old, Dunn left his family on Long Island to attend The Gunnery.

The Los Angeles Dodgers selected Dunn in the 37th round of the 2013 Major League Baseball draft. He did not sign and attended Boston College to play college baseball for the Boston College Eagles. As an 18-year-old freshman in 2014, Dunn pitched 12 1/3 innings. He went 1–1 with a 7.30 earned run average (ERA) and 12 strikeouts. As a sophomore, he appeared in 20 games with three starts. A month into the season he became the team's closer. He finished the year 4–4 with a 4.94 ERA, 46 strikeouts and five saves. After the 2015 season, he played collegiate summer baseball with the Cotuit Kettleers of the Cape Cod Baseball League. Dunn started his junior year as the closer, but was moved into the starting rotation during the season. He recorded a 2.06 ERA with a 4–2 record in his junior season.

== Career ==
=== New York Mets ===
Dunn was drafted by the New York Mets in the first round, with the 19th overall selection, of the 2016 Major League Baseball draft. He signed with the Mets and was assigned to the Brooklyn Cyclones, where he spent all of 2016, posting a 1–1 record with a 1.50 ERA in 11 games (eight starts). He spent 2017 with the St. Lucie Mets where he went 5–6 with a 5.00 ERA in 20 games (16 starts).

MLB.com ranked Dunn as New York's third best prospect going into the 2018 season. He began the season with St. Lucie and was promoted to the Binghamton Rumble Ponies during the year. In 24 starts between the two clubs, Dunn was 8–8 with a 3.59 ERA.

=== Seattle Mariners ===
On December 3, 2018, the Mets traded Dunn, Jay Bruce, Jarred Kelenic, Anthony Swarzak, and Gerson Bautista to the Seattle Mariners for Edwin Díaz, Robinson Canó, and $20 million. He spent 2019 with the Arkansas Travelers, going 9–5 with a 3.55 ERA over 25 starts. He was named to the 2019 All-Star Futures Game.

The Mariners selected Dunn's contract and promoted him to the major leagues on September 10, 2019. He made his major league debut on September 12 versus the Cincinnati Reds, allowing two runs over 2/3 of an inning.

In 2020, he led the AL in stolen bases allowed, with 13.

On August 19, 2021, Dunn was placed on the 60-day injured list with a shoulder strain, an injury that had kept him out since mid-June. Dunn was shut down for the season in mid-September due to the injury.

=== Cincinnati Reds ===
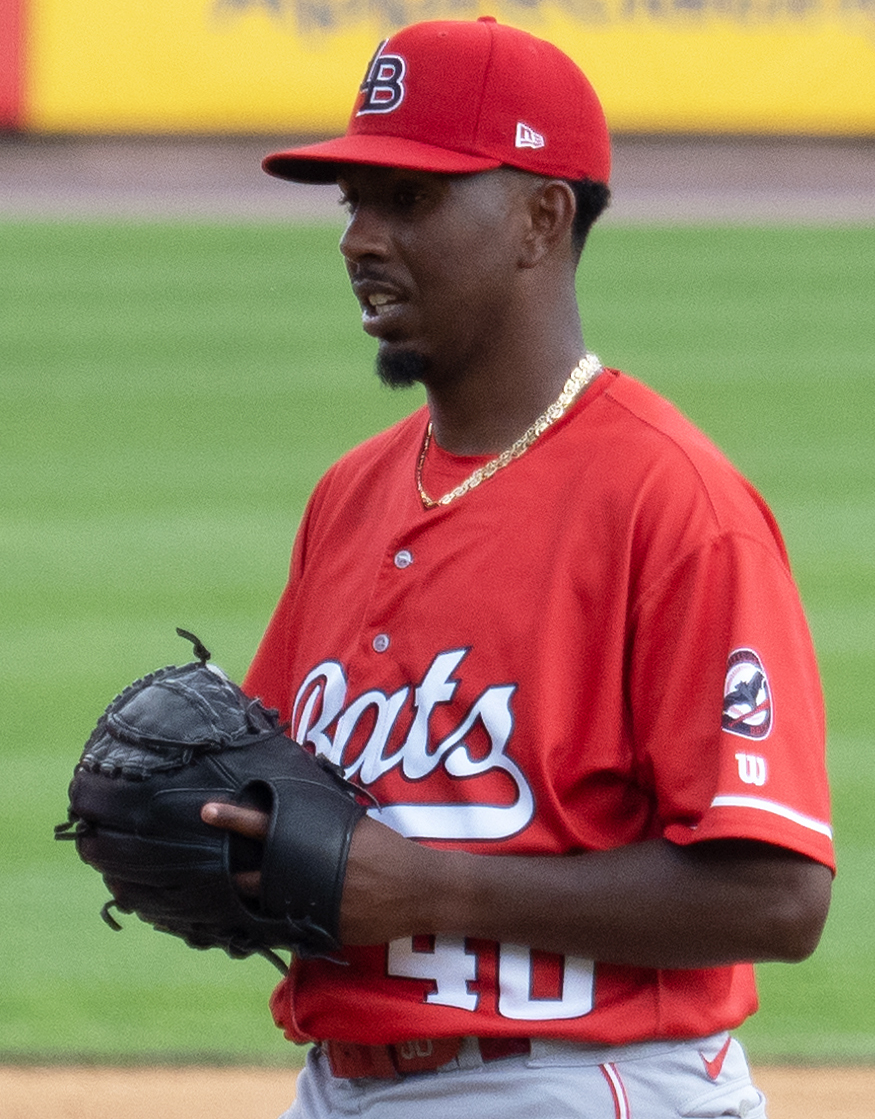
Dunn with the Louisville Bats in 2022

On March 14, 2022, the Mariners traded Dunn, Jake Fraley, Brandon Williamson, and a player to be named later (Connor Phillips) to the Cincinnati Reds in exchange for Eugenio Suárez and Jesse Winker. Dunn began his Reds tenure on the 60-day injured list, with a report noting that the same shoulder strain from 2021 would keep him shelved for months. He was activated on July 24, and optioned to the Triple-A Louisville Bats. On August 8, he was recalled to the major leagues to make his Reds debut as the starting pitcher against the New York Mets.

On March 4, 2023, it was announced that Dunn would be shut down for “a couple of months” so he could recover from inflammation in the right subscapularis muscle of his rotator cuff. On August 16, he began a rehab assignment with the rookie–level Arizona Complex League Reds. However, on August 29, Dunn was pulled off of the assignment after suffering a setback in his recovery. On September 1, it was announced that Dunn would undergo surgery to repair a torn anterior capsule in his right shoulder. On October 9, Dunn was removed from the 40–man roster and sent outright to Triple–A Louisville. He elected free agency on October 11.

=== Chicago White Sox ===
On October 14, 2024, it was announced that Dunn would be holding a showcase for teams interested in his services. On November 8, Dunn signed a minor league contract with the Chicago White Sox organization. He made 10 appearances (7 starts) for the Triple-A Charlotte Knights, but struggled to a 2-3 record and 7.64 ERA with 38 strikeouts over 33 innings of work. Dunn was released by the White Sox organization on May 28, 2025.

=== Kansas City Royals ===
On June 5, 2025, Dunn signed a minor league contract with the Kansas City Royals. In three appearances for the rookie-level Arizona Complex League Royals, he struggled to an 0-3 record and 20.25 ERA with two strikeouts; similarly, he struggled to an 0-4 record and 10.34 ERA with 17 strikeouts across six games (four starts) for the Triple-A Omaha Storm Chasers. Dunn was released by the Royals organization on August 3.

=== Los Angeles Angels ===
On April 27, 2026, Dunn signed a minor league contract with the Los Angeles Angels. He made 27 appearances (including two starts) for the Triple–A Salt Lake Bees, accumulating a 1–4 record and 6.13 ERA with 39 strikeouts across 39 2/3 innings pitched. Dunn was released by the Angels organization on August 3.

=== High Point Rockers ===
On August 15, 2026, Dunn signed with the High Point Rockers of the Atlantic League of Professional Baseball.

== Personal life ==
Dunn is the older brother of Phoenix Suns forward Ryan Dunn.
