= Julián García =

Julián García may refer to:

- Julián García Centeno (born 1933), Spanish-born Peruvian prelate of the Roman Catholic Church
- Julián García Valverde (born 1946), Spanish politician
- Julián García Vargas (1945–2026), Spanish economist and politician
- Julian S. Garcia, American writer
- Julian Garcia (baseball) (born 1995), American baseball pitcher
