= Graham Ashcraft =

American baseball player (born 1998)

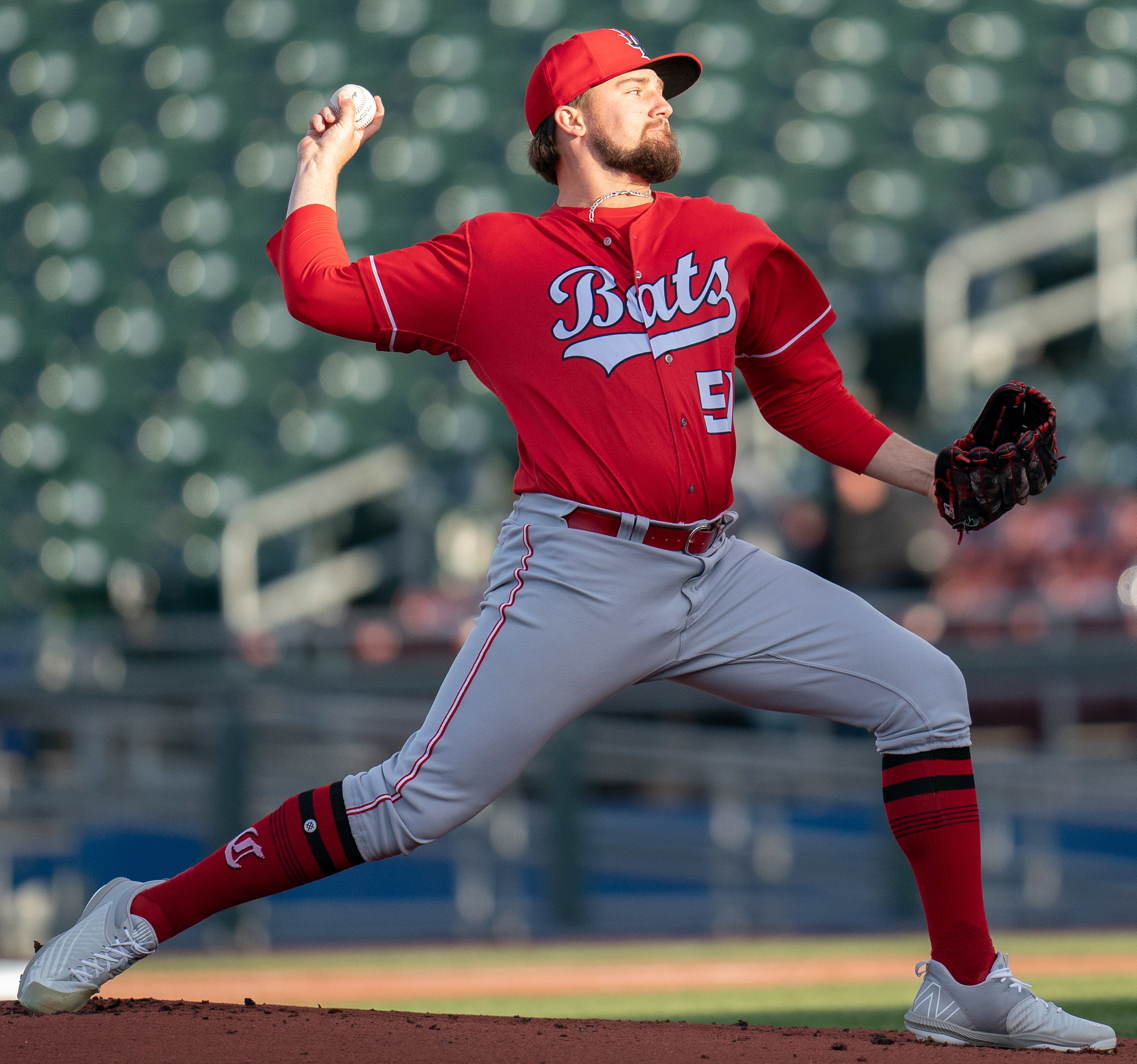
- Ashcraft with the Louisville Bats in 2022

Cincinnati Reds – No. 23
- Pitcher
- Born: February 11, 1998 (age 28); Huntsville, Alabama, U.S.
- Bats: Left Throws: Right

MLB debut
- May 22, 2022, for the Cincinnati Reds

MLB statistics (through 2026 season)
- Win–loss record: 26–26
- Earned run average: 4.70
- Strikeouts: 343
- Stats at Baseball Reference

Teams
- Cincinnati Reds (2022–present)

Douglas Graham Ashcraft (born February 11, 1998) is an American professional baseball pitcher for the Cincinnati Reds of Major League Baseball (MLB). He made his MLB debut in 2022.

== Early life and amateur career ==
Ashcraft grew up in Gurley, Alabama, and attended Huntsville High School. He was selected in the 12th round of the 2016 Major League Baseball draft by the Los Angeles Dodgers, but opted not to sign with the team.

Ashcraft enrolled at Mississippi State University and began his college baseball career with the Mississippi State Bulldogs. As a freshman he went 2–0 with a 5.63 ERA and 25 strikeouts in ten appearances. Following the season Ashcraft transferred to the University of Alabama at Birmingham (UAB) to play for the UAB Blazers. After sitting out one season due to NCAA transfer rules, Ashcraft went 2–5 with a 5.62 ERA and 56 strikeouts in 53 innings over 17 pitching appearances.

== Professional career ==
The Cincinnati Reds selected Ashcraft in the sixth round of the 2019 Major League Baseball draft, making Ashcraft the highest-selected player in the MLB draft from UAB. After signing with Cincinnati, he was assigned to the Rookie-level Greeneville Reds. Ashcraft did not play in a game in 2020 due to the cancelation of the minor league season because of the COVID-19 pandemic. He was assigned to the High-A Dayton Dragons to begin 2021, where he went 4–1 with a 2.33 ERA and 55 strikeouts before being promoted to the Double-A Chattanooga Lookouts. Ashcraft began the 2022 season with the Triple-A Louisville Bats.

Ashcraft was promoted to the Reds' major league roster on May 20, 2022. He made his MLB debut on May 22, tossing 4 1/3 innings against the Toronto Blue Jays and allowing two earned runs. On May 23, he was removed from the 40-man roster and returned to Triple-A Louisville. On May 27, Ashcraft had his contract selected back to the active roster. He finished the season with a 5–6 record and a 4.89 ERA and 71 strikeouts over 19 starts.

In 2023, Ashcraft made 26 starts for Cincinnati, logging a 7–9 record and 4.76 ERA with 111 strikeouts in 145 2/3 innings pitched. On September 2, 2023, Ashcraft was placed on the injured list with a stress reaction in his right big toe. On September 16, it was announced that Ashcraft would undergo season–ending surgery to repair the toe.

Ashcraft began the 2024 campaign as part of Cincinnati's rotation, compiling a 5–5 record and 5.24 ERA with 57 strikeouts across 15 starts. On July 10, he was optioned to the Triple–A Louisville Bats. However, the option was later voided. and Ashcraft was placed on the injured list with a right elbow strain. He was transferred to the 60–day injured list on July 29.

For the 2025 Reds season, Ashcraft was moved to the bullpen and responded with an improved 3.99 ERA. Ashcraft was manager Terry Francona’s second most used high-leverage relief pitcher after Tony Santillan.

Prior to the 2026 season, Ashcraft won his arbitration case against the Reds. Ashcraft had filed for a salary of $1.75 million whereas the Reds filed at $1.25 million. On May 29, 2026, Ashcraft was placed on the 60-day injured list due to a sprain in the ulnar collateral ligament of his pitching elbow. He was activated off of the injured list on September 6.

== Personal life ==
Ashcraft is the son of Chuck Ashcraft and Michelle Daymond. He has two brothers.
