= José Franco (baseball) =

Venezuelan baseball player (born 2000)

Cincinnati Reds – No. 74
- Pitcher
- Born: November 25, 2000 (age 25); Maracay, Venezuela
- Bats: Right Throws: Right

MLB debut
- March 30, 2026, for the Cincinnati Reds

MLB statistics (through 2026 season)
- Win–loss record: 1–0
- Earned run average: 4.43
- Strikeouts: 15
- Stats at Baseball Reference

Teams
- Cincinnati Reds (2026–present)

José Alejandro Franco (born November 25, 2000) is a Venezuelan professional baseball pitcher for the Cincinnati Reds of Major League Baseball (MLB). He made his MLB debut in 2026.

== Career ==
Franco signed with the Cincinnati Reds as an international free agent on October 16, 2018. He made his professional debut in 2019 with the Dominican Summer League Reds, pitching to a 2.20 ERA with 59 strikeouts across 14 starts. Franco did not play in a game in 2020 due to the cancellation of the minor league season because of the COVID-19 pandemic.

In 2021, Franco made 19 appearances (11 starts) for the Single-A Daytona Tortugas, for whom he posted a 2–3 record, 3.52 ERA, and 90 strikeouts; Franco returned to Daytona for the 2022 season, where he registered a 1–6 record and 4.44 ERA with 104 strikeouts across 20 appearances. He missed the entirety of the 2023 season after undergoing Tommy John surgery.

Franco returned in 2024 to pitch for Daytona and the High-A Dayton Dragons; in 22 combined starts for the two affiliates, he posted a 2–3 record and 3.52 ERA with 90 strikeouts across 76 2/3 innings pitched. He started 2025 with the Double-A Chattanooga Lookouts before being promoted to the Triple-A Louisville Bats. In 31 appearances (including 26 starts) for both affiliates, Franco logged a cumulative 10–4 record and 3.11 ERA with 118 strikeouts over 110 innings of work.

On November 6, 2025, the Reds added Franco to their 40-man roster to prevent him from reaching minor league free agency. Franco was optioned to Triple-A Louisville to begin the 2026 season. However, following an injury to Nick Lodolo, Franco was announced as part of Cincinnati's Opening Day roster.
