= Ivan Johnson (baseball) =

American baseball player (born 1998)

Free agent
- Infielder / Outfielder
- Born: October 11, 1998 (age 28); Atlanta, Georgia, U.S.
- Bats: Switch Throws: Right

MLB debut
- June 30, 2026, for the Cincinnati Reds

MLB statistics (through 2026 season)
- Batting average: .063
- Home runs: 0
- Runs batted in: 0
- Stats at Baseball Reference

Teams
- Cincinnati Reds (2026)

Vincent Ivan Johnson (born October 11, 1998) is an American professional baseball infielder and outfielder who is a free agent. He has previously played in Major League Baseball (MLB) for the Cincinnati Reds. He made his MLB debut in 2026.

== Amateur career ==
Johnson attended Kennesaw Mountain High School in Kennesaw, Georgia. He enrolled at the University of Georgia and appeared in 32 games for the Bulldogs. In 2018, immediately following his freshman year, he played collegiate summer baseball for the Kalamazoo Growlers of the Northwoods League. He transferred to Chipola College for his sophomore year, appearing in 57 games in what would prove to be his final year of college ball.

== Professional career ==
Johnson was drafted by the Cincinnati Reds in the fourth round, with the 114th overall selection, of the 2019 Major League Baseball draft; he signed with the team on June 10, 2019. He made his professional debut with the rookie-level Greeneville Reds, hitting .255 with six home runs, 22 RBI, and 11 stolen bases in 46 games. Johnson did not play in a game in 2020 due to the cancellation of the minor league season because of the COVID-19 pandemic.

Johnson returned to action in 2021 with the Single-A Daytona Tortugas and High-A Dayton Dragons. In 79 appearances split between the two affiliates, he batted a combined .264/.367/.451 with 10 home runs, 41 RBI, and 11 stolen bases. Johnson spent the 2022 campaign with the Double-A Chattanooga Lookouts, hitting .261 with four home runs and 25 RBI in 50 games; he returned to Chattanooga in 2023, batting .225 with career-highs in home runs (14), RBI (55), and stolen bases (20).

Johnson split the 2024 season between Chattanooga and the Triple-A Louisville Bats, slashing a cumulative .256/.355/.464 with 13 home runs, 47 RBI, and 15 stolen bases. He returned to Louisville for the 2025 campaign, posting a .221/.337/.378 slash line with seven home runs, 25 RBI, and 10 stolen bases.

Johnson was assigned to the Triple-A Louisville Bats to begin the 2026 season, batting .290/.388/.489 with nine home runs, 28 RBI, and 11 stolen bases across his first 55 games. On June 30, 2026, Johnson was selected to the 40-man roster and promoted to the major leagues for the first time. On July 28, Johnson recorded his first Major League hit in the bottom of the fifth inning, lining a single to left field off Cleveland Guardians pitcher Gavin Williams. On October 1, he was sent outright to Triple-A Louisville Bats. He elected free agency on November 2.

== International career ==
Johnson played for Team Great Britain in the 2026 World Baseball Classic.
