= Carlos Jorge (baseball) =

Dominican baseball player (born 2003)

Cincinnati Reds – No. 38
- Center fielder
- Born: September 22, 2003 (age 23); Puerto Plata, Dominican Republic
- Bats: Left Throws: Right

MLB debut
- September 4, 2026, for the Cincinnati Reds

MLB statistics (through 2026 season)
- Batting average: .217
- Home runs: 1
- Runs batted in: 2
- Stats at Baseball Reference

Teams
- Cincinnati Reds (2026–present)

Carlos Enmanuel Jorge (born September 22, 2003) is a Dominican professional baseball center fielder for the Cincinnati Reds of Major League Baseball (MLB). He made his MLB debut in 2026.

== Career ==
On January 15, 2021, Jorge signed with the Cincinnati Reds as an international free agent for $495,000. He made his professional debut with the Dominican Summer League Reds, batting .346 with three home runs and 33 RBI in 47 games. Jorge spent the 2022 season with the Arizona Complex League Reds, batting .261 with seven home runs and 21 RBI in 42 games. He began the 2023 season with the Single-A Daytona Tortugas before being promoted to the High-A Dayton Dragons. Between the two affiliates in 2023, Jorge slashed .282/.374/.464 with 12 home runs, 50 RBI, and 32 stolen bases. He returned to Dayton in 2024, batting .220 with 12 home runs and 28 stolen bases over 95 games before his season ended prematurely due to a sprained left thumb. Jorge played the 2025 campaign with Dayton, batting .251/.342/.355 with six home runs, 37 RBI, and 40 stolen bases. After the season, he played in the Dominican Winter League with the Gigantes del Cibao.

Jorge was assigned to the Double-A Chattanooga Lookouts to begin the 2026 season and was later promoted to the Triple-A Louisville Bats. Between the two affiliates, he slashed .308/.376/.427 with eight home runs and 43 RBI in 88 games. On September 4, 2026, the Reds selected Jorge's contract and promoted him to the major leagues for the first time.
