= Rhett Lowder =

American baseball player (born 2002)

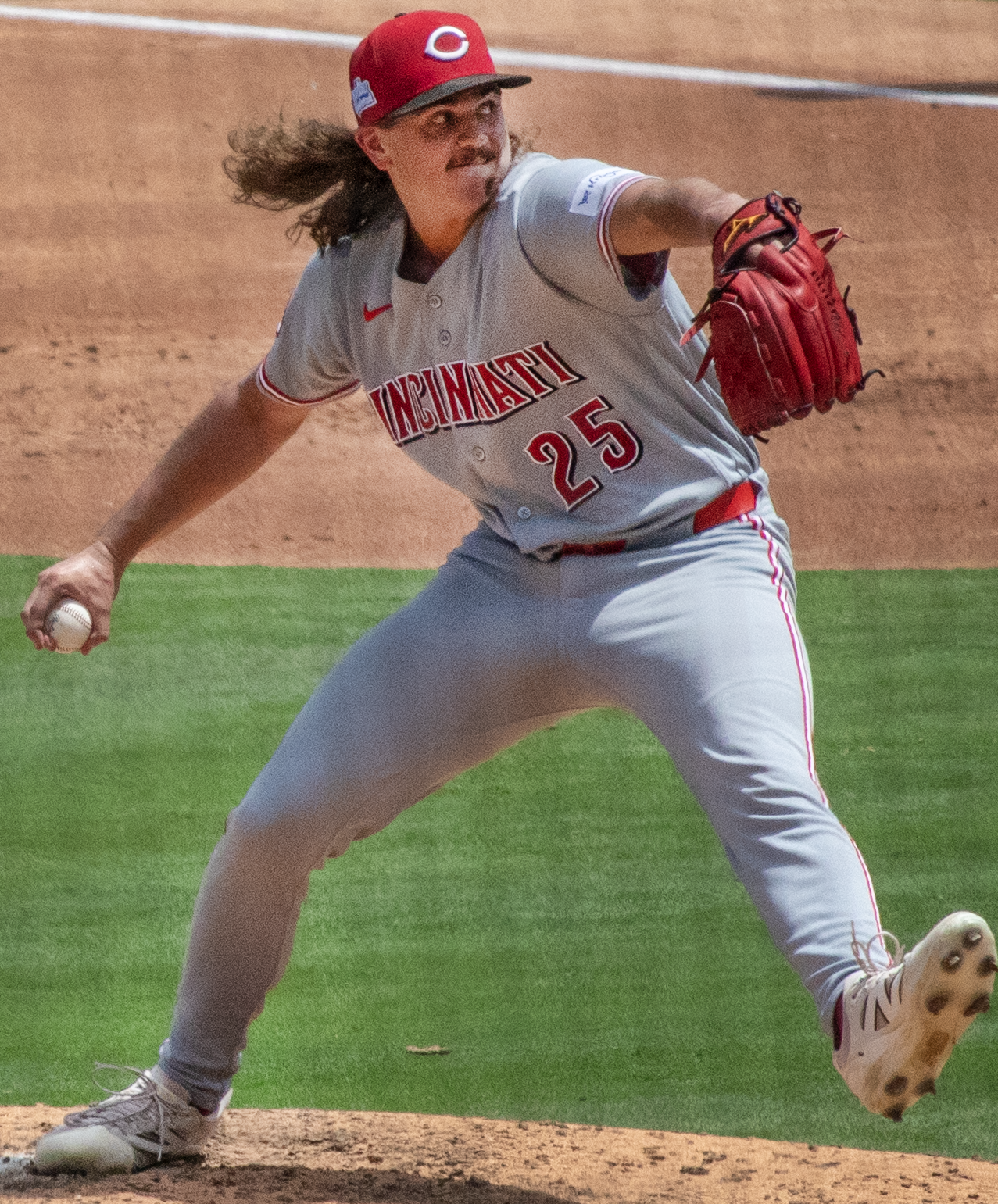
- Lowder with the Reds in 2026

Cincinnati Reds – No. 25
- Pitcher
- Born: March 8, 2002 (age 24); Albemarle, North Carolina, U.S.
- Bats: Right Throws: Right

MLB debut
- August 30, 2024, for the Cincinnati Reds

MLB statistics (through 2026 season)
- Win–loss record: 9–14
- Earned run average: 4.88
- Strikeouts: 125
- Stats at Baseball Reference

Teams
- Cincinnati Reds (2024, 2026–present)
Medals
Men's baseball
Representing the United States
Haarlem Baseball Week
Bronze medal – third place	2022	Team

Rhett Hamilton Lowder (born March 8, 2002) is an American professional baseball pitcher for the Cincinnati Reds of Major League Baseball (MLB). He made his MLB debut in 2024.

== Amateur career ==
Lowder attended North Stanly High School in New London, North Carolina, where he played for the baseball team. During his sophomore season in 2018, he pitched a 9–2 win–loss record and with a 1.03 earned run average (ERA). As a junior in 2019, he went 9–0 with a 0.61 ERA, 115 strikeouts, and seven walks over 68.1 innings. His senior season in 2020 was shortened due to the COVID-19 pandemic and he was unselected in the shortened 2020 Major League Baseball draft, leading to him enrolling at Wake Forest University to play college baseball for the Wake Forest Demon Deacons.

During his freshman season at Wake Forest in 2021, Lowder appeared in 14 games (making 12 starts) in which he went 4–2 with a 6.12 ERA, 78 strikeouts, and 14 home runs allowed over 67.2 innings. That summer, he played for the Strasburg Express of the Valley Baseball League. As a sophomore in 2022, Lowder started 16 games and pitched to an 11–3 record with a 3.08 ERA, 105 strikeouts and 26 walks over 99.1 innings. He was named the Atlantic Coast Conference Baseball Pitcher of the Year, becoming the first ever player from Wake Forest to win the award. Following the season's end, he was named to the USA Baseball Collegiate National Team .

In 2023, Lowder went 15–0, leading NCAA Division I in wins, and also finished in the top 10 nationally in ERA (1.87), strikeouts (a school-record 143), and WHIP (0.95), playing a key role in the Deacons' run to the Men's College World Series. Lowder repeated as the ACC Pitcher of the Year, and was also a consensus first-team All-American, the ACC Scholar-Athlete of the Year, and the men's ACC Athlete of the Year across all sports, sharing the last of these honors with women's winner Katelyn Tuohy of NC State cross country and track.

== Professional career ==
The Cincinnati Reds selected Lowder in the first round, with the seventh overall selection, of the 2023 MLB draft. On July 14, 2023, Lowder signed with the Reds for an under slot deal worth $5.7 million. Lowder made his professional debut in 2024 with the High–A Dayton Dragons, later receiving promotions to the Double–A Chattanooga Lookouts and Triple–A Louisville Bats. In 22 starts split between the three affiliates, he compiled a 6–4 record and 3.64 ERA with 113 strikeouts across 108 2/3 innings pitched.

On August 29, 2024, the Reds announced that Lowder would be promoted to the major leagues for the first time. His contract was formally purchased the next day. After being called up, Lowder went 2–2 over 6 starts with a 1.17 ERA for the Reds in 2024.

The Reds paid particular attention to the health of Lowder's elbow during spring training in 2025. During May, Lowder began making minor league appearances, seeking rehabilitation for a forearm strain. On May 23, he suffered an additional oblique strain, and was transferred to the 60-day injured list on June 4.
