= Tejay Antone =

American baseball player (born 1993)

Cincinnati Reds – No. 70
- Pitcher
- Born: December 5, 1993 (age 32); Oklahoma City, Oklahoma, U.S.
- Bats: Right Throws: Right

MLB debut
- July 27, 2020, for the Cincinnati Reds

MLB statistics (through 2026 season)
- Win–loss record: 5–5
- Earned run average: 2.73
- Strikeouts: 153
- Stats at Baseball Reference

Teams
- Cincinnati Reds (2020–2021, 2023–2024, 2026–present)

Tejay Anthony Antone (/ˈtiːdʒeɪ ˈæntoʊn/ TEE-jay AN-tohn; born December 5, 1993) is an American professional baseball pitcher for the Cincinnati Reds of Major League Baseball (MLB). He made his MLB debut in 2020.

== Amateur career ==
Antone attended Mansfield Legacy High School in Mansfield, Texas. Antone was drafted by the New York Mets in the 22nd round of the 2012 MLB draft, but did not sign and attended Texas Christian University. He appeared in 6 games for the TCU Horned Frogs in 2013. Antone transferred to Weatherford College for the 2014 season, going 7–6 with a 2.88 ERA over 84 1/3 innings.

== Professional career ==
Antone was drafted by the Cincinnati Reds in the fifth round, with the 155th overall selection, of the 2014 Major League Baseball draft.

Antone split the 2014 season between the Arizona League Reds and the Billings Mustangs, going a combined 2–3 with a 5.76 ERA over 54 2/3 innings. He spent the 2015 season with the Dayton Dragons, going 6–10 with a 2.91 ERA over 158 innings. He split the 2016 season between the Daytona Tortugas and the Louisville Bats, going a combined 14–7 with a 3.45 ERA over 156 1/3 innings. He missed the 2017 season after undergoing Tommy John surgery. He spent the 2018 season with Daytona, going 14–6 with a 3.51 ERA over 151 1/3 innings. Antone split the 2019 season between the Chattanooga Lookouts and Louisville, going a combined 11–12 with a 4.00 ERA over 146 1/3 innings.

Antone was added to the Reds 40–man roster after the 2019 season. He made his major league debut on July 27, 2020, giving up one run in 4 1/3 innings of work against the Chicago Cubs. In 2020, Antone went 0–3 with a 2.80 ERA in 13 appearances (four starts), spanning 35 1/3 innings.

In 2021, Antone spent most of the season on the IL with a forearm injury, making 23 appearances with a 2.14 ERA spanning 35 2/3 innings. In August, he announced on Twitter that he would undergo his second Tommy John surgery. Antone missed the 2022 season recovering from the injury.

On February 7, 2023, Antone received a platelet-rich plasma injection to treat a flexor strain in his forearm, causing him to miss the beginning of the 2023 season. On September 1, he was activated from the injured list. He made 5 appearances down the stretch, logging a 1.59 ERA with 7 strikeouts across 5 2/3 innings pitched.

Antone began the 2024 season pitching out of Cincinnati's bullpen, recording a 4.50 ERA with two strikeouts across two appearances. On April 8, 2024, it was announced that Antone would undergo surgery after a he tore a tendon completely off the bone and suffered a partial ligament tear in his right elbow. On November 1, Antone was removed from the 40–man roster and sent outright to Louisville. Antone split the 2025 campaign between Dayton, Chattanooga, and Louisville, but struggled to a combined 0-1 record and 10.20 ERA with 15 strikeouts over 15 innings of work. He elected free agency following the season on November 6, 2025.

On November 14, 2025, Antone re-signed with the Reds organization on a minor league contract.

Antone opened the 2026 season with Triple-A Louisville, posting a 1−1 record with 2.25 ERA in 12 appearances before having his contract selected to Cincinnati's active roster on May 6, 2026, following an injury to closer Emilio Pagán. That evening, in his first MLB appearance in over two years, Antone pitched a perfect eighth inning, striking out two, in a 7−6 extra-inning loss to the Chicago Cubs. He is only the third player in MLB history to make it back to the bigs after three Tommy John surgeries, following Jonny Venters and Jason Isringhausen.

== Personal life ==
Antone and his wife, Kelsi, married in September 2019.

On July 17, 2026, he released The Tommy John Protocol: How to Rebuild Your Arm, Your Mind, and Your Faith, a self-published book with Starling Publishing that's a memoir and instructional guide about recovering from the medical procedure.
