= Spencer Steer =

American baseball player (born 1997)

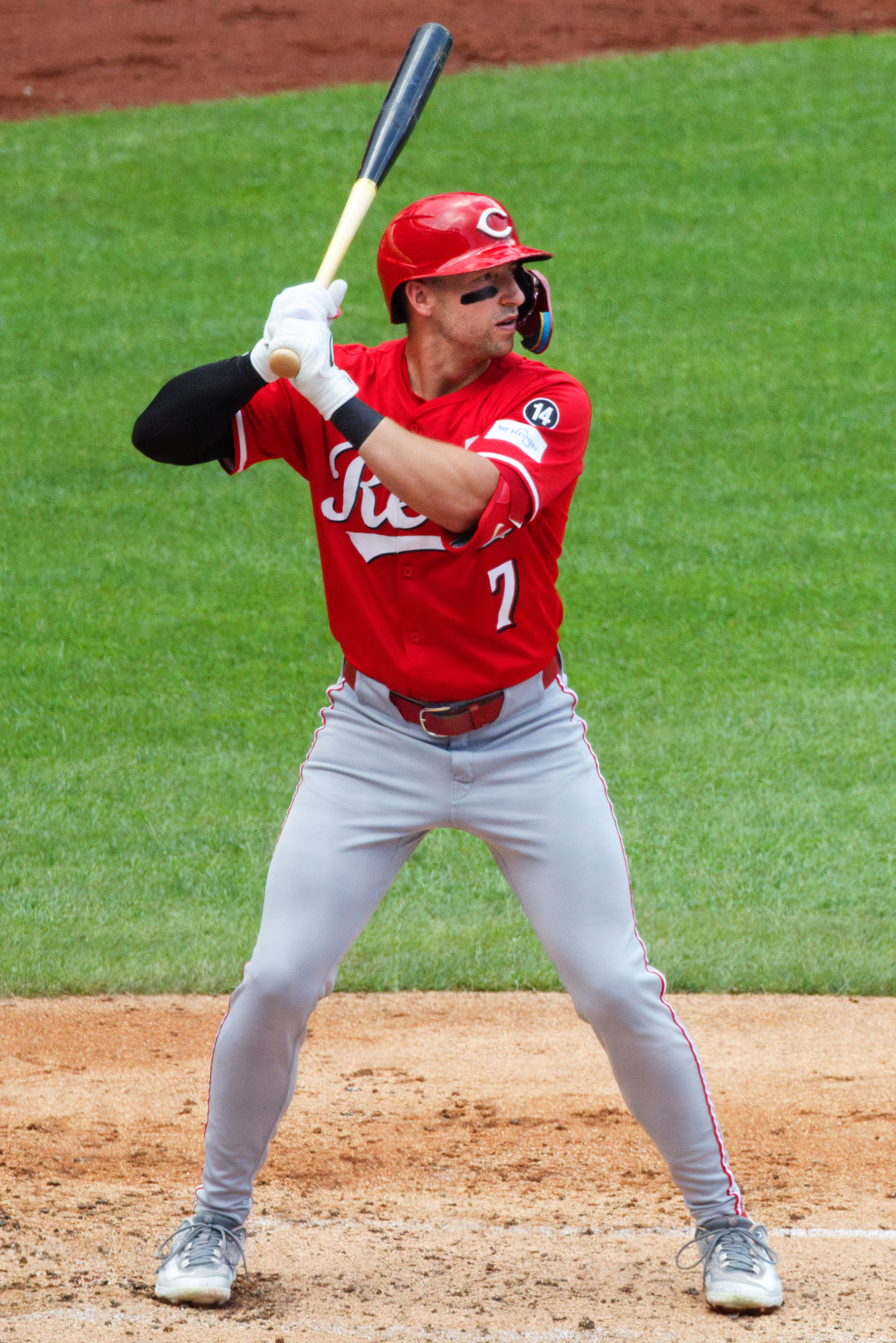
- Steer with the Reds in 2025

Cincinnati Reds – No. 7
- Utility player
- Born: December 7, 1997 (age 28); Long Beach, California, U.S.
- Bats: Right Throws: Right

MLB debut
- September 2, 2022, for the Cincinnati Reds

MLB statistics (through 2026 season)
- Batting average: .242
- Home runs: 82
- Runs batted in: 301
- Stats at Baseball Reference

Teams
- Cincinnati Reds (2022–present)

Spencer Gordon Steer (born December 7, 1997) is an American professional baseball utility player for the Cincinnati Reds of Major League Baseball (MLB). He made his MLB debut in 2022.

== Amateur career ==
Steer attended Millikan High School in Long Beach, California. He was drafted by the Cleveland Indians in the 29th round of the 2016 Major League Baseball draft but did not sign and played college baseball at the University of Oregon. In 2018, he played collegiate summer baseball with the Orleans Firebirds of the Cape Cod Baseball League. Steer was selected by the Minnesota Twins in the third round of the 2019 MLB draft.

== Professional career ==
=== Minnesota Twins ===
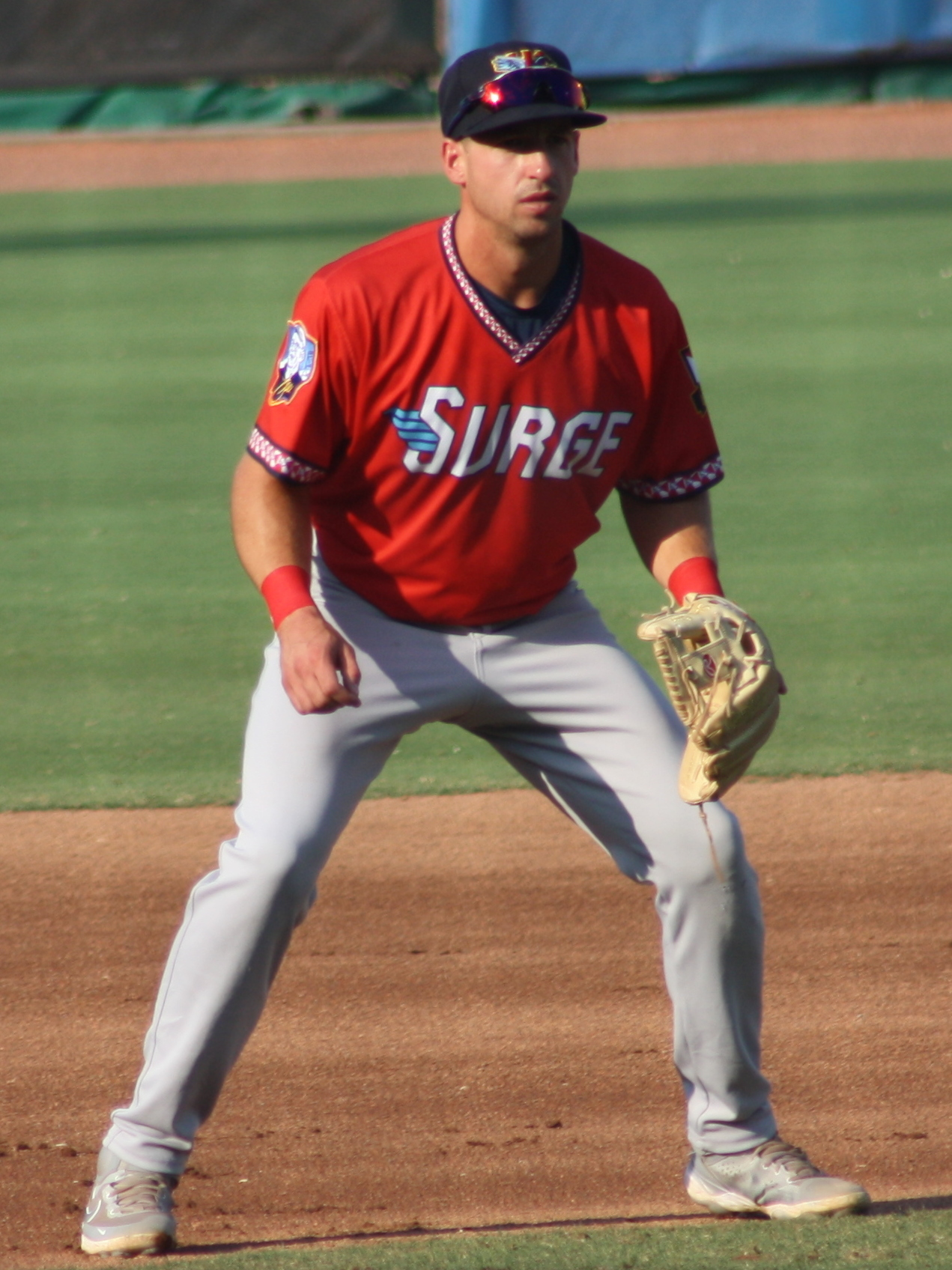
Steer with the Wichita Surge in 2021

Steer made his professional debut with the Elizabethton Twins and Cedar Rapids Kernels. He did not play a minor league game in 2020 because the season was cancelled due to the COVID-19 pandemic. He started 2021 with Cedar Rapids before being promoted to the Wichita Wind Surge. Over 110 games between the two teams, Steer slashed .254/.348/.484 with 24 home runs and 66 RBIs.

=== Cincinnati Reds ===
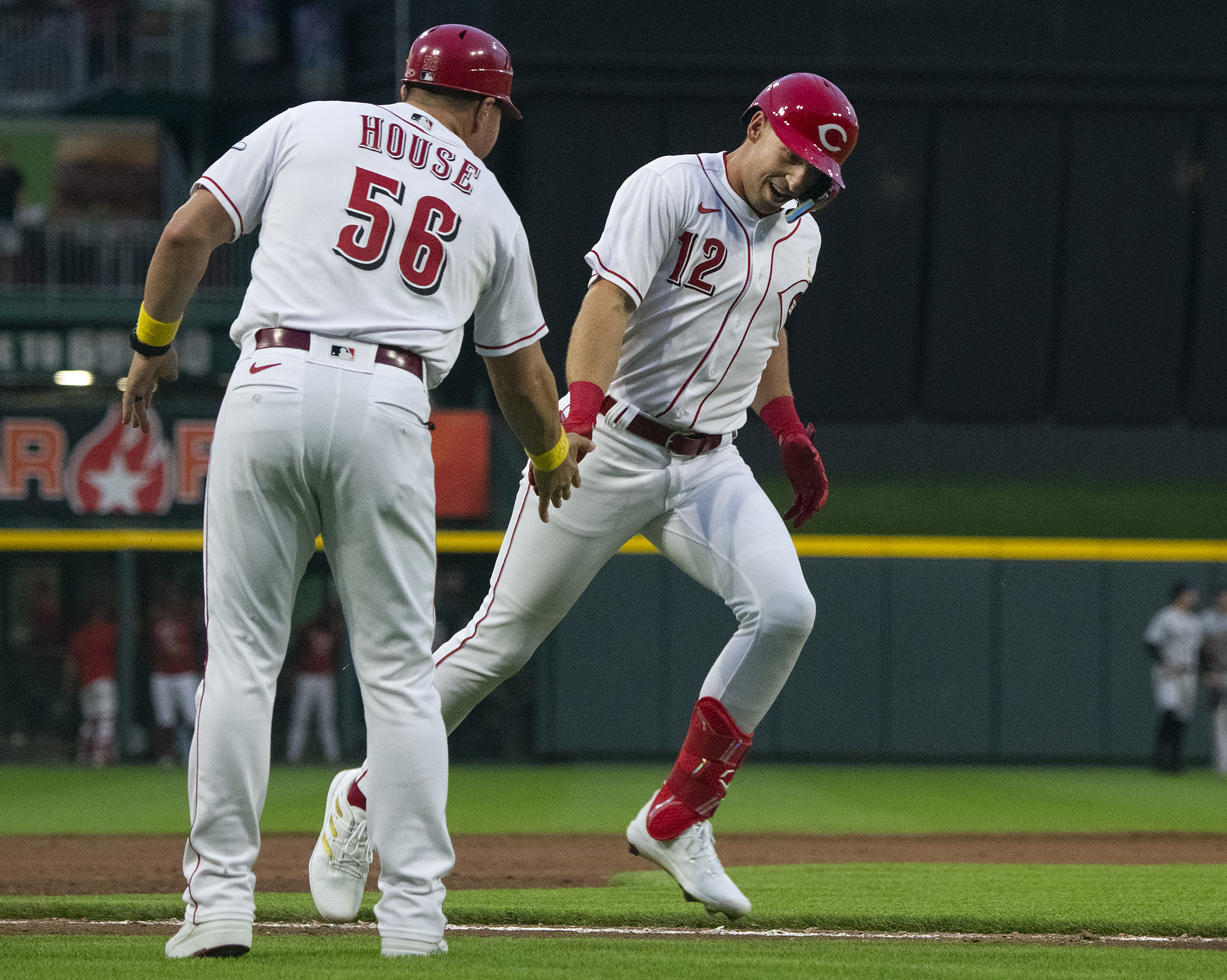
Steer with the Reds in 2022

On August 2, 2022, the Twins traded Steer, Steve Hajjar, and Christian Encarnacion-Strand, to the Cincinnati Reds in exchange for Tyler Mahle. On September 1, the Reds selected Steer's contract and promoted him to the major leagues. He made his debut the next day, going 2–for–2 with a home run for his first Major League hit, a double, and walking twice. In the 28 games Steer appeared in, he ended the season slashing .211/.306/.326.

In 2023, Steer played 73 games at first base, 48 games in the outfield, 47 games at third base, and 16 games at second base. Over 156 games, he hit .271 with 23 home runs, 15 stolen bases, 74 runs, and 86 RBI.

In 2024, Steer played 102 games in the outfield, 63 games at first base, seven games at second base, and one game at shortstop. He suffered a steep drop in batting average from .271 to .225, but hit 20 home runs and stole 25 bases.

On June 27, 2025, Steer recorded his first career three-home run game against the San Diego Padres and became the first Reds player with a three-homer game since Jesse Winker in 2021.

Steer made 98 appearances for Cincinnati during the 2026 season, batting .238/.319/.421 with 16 home runs and 40 RBI. On July 27, 2026, Steer was placed on the injured list due to a partial tear of a sheath in his right wrist. He was transferred to the 60–day injured list on September 18. On September 23, it was announced that Steer would undergo surgery for the injury, officially ending his season.
