= Brandon Williamson (baseball) =

American baseball player (born 1998)

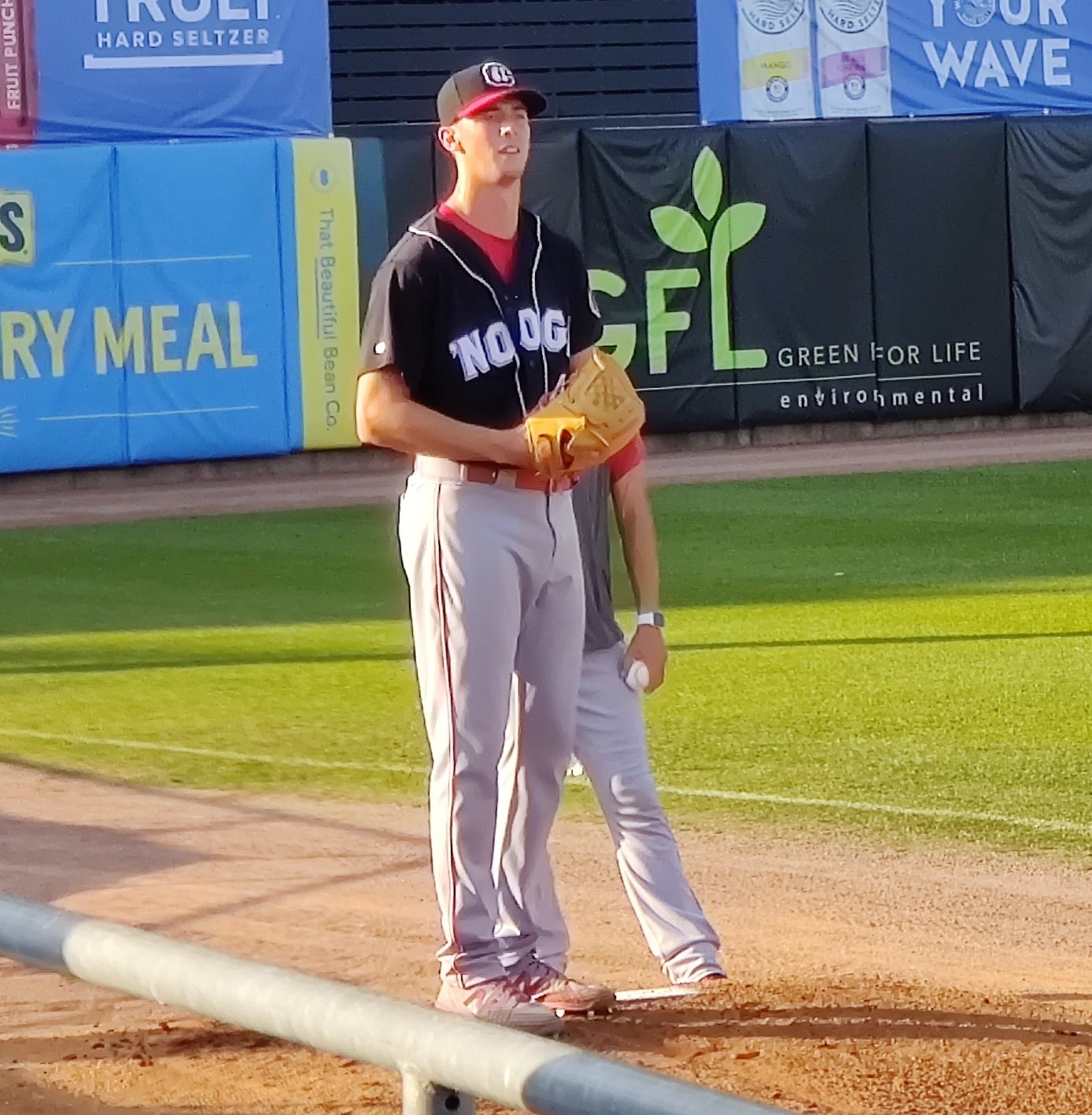
- Williamson with the Chattanooga Lookouts in 2022

Cincinnati Reds – No. 55
- Pitcher
- Born: April 2, 1998 (age 28); Fairmont, Minnesota, U.S.
- Bats: Right Throws: Left

MLB debut
- May 16, 2023, for the Cincinnati Reds

MLB statistics (through 2026 season)
- Win–loss record: 10–10
- Earned run average: 4.65
- Strikeouts: 146
- Stats at Baseball Reference

Teams
- Cincinnati Reds (2023–2024, 2026–present)

Brandon Martin Williamson (born April 2, 1998) is an American professional baseball pitcher for the Cincinnati Reds of Major League Baseball (MLB). He made his MLB debut in 2023.

== Amateur career ==
Williamson attended Martin County West High School in Sherburn, Minnesota, and played college baseball at North Iowa Area Community College and Texas Christian University (TCU). In summer 2017, he played for the Thunder Bay Border Cats of the Northwoods League. He was drafted by the Milwaukee Brewers in the 36th round of the 2018 Major League Baseball draft out of North Iowa but did not sign and transferred to TCU.

== Professional career ==
=== Seattle Mariners ===
The Seattle Mariners selected Williamson in the second round of the 2019 Major League Baseball draft and he signed. Williamson made his professional debut with the Everett AquaSox, posting a 2.35 ERA over 15 1/3 innings. Due to the cancellation of the 2020 Minor League Baseball season caused by the COVID-19 pandemic, he did not pitch for a team, but was a member of the Mariners' 60-man player pool. Williamson returned to Everett to start 2021 and was promoted to the Arkansas Travelers during the season. Over 19 starts between the two teams, he went 4–6 with a 3.39 ERA and 153 strikeouts over 98 1/3 innings.

=== Cincinnati Reds ===
On March 14, 2022, the Mariners traded Williamson, Justin Dunn, Jake Fraley, and a player to be named later (Connor Phillips) to the Cincinnati Reds in exchange for Jesse Winker and Eugenio Suárez. Williamson began the 2022 season with the Double-A Chattanooga Lookouts before receiving a promotion to the Triple-A Louisville Bats later in the season. In 27 starts between the two, he worked to a 6–7 record and 4.11 ERA with 123 strikeouts in 122 2/3 innings pitched. On November 15, the Reds added Williamson to their 40-man roster to protect him from the Rule 5 draft.

After making a push for a spot in the Reds’ rotation during spring training, Williamson was optioned to Triple-A Louisville to begin the 2023 season. In 8 starts, he struggled to a 2–4 record and 6.62 ERA with 27 strikeouts. On May 15, 2023, the Reds announced that Williamson would make his debut the next day as the starting pitcher against the Colorado Rockies. In 23 starts during his rookie campaign, he logged a 5–5 record and 4.46 ERA with 98 strikeouts across 117 innings pitched.

Williamson began the 2024 season on the injured list with a left shoulder strain. On May 8, 2024, he was transferred to the 60–day injured list. Williamson was activated on September 1. In 4 games (3 starts) for Cincinnati, he posted a 3.77 ERA with 12 strikeouts over 14 1/3 innings pitched. On September 18, it was announced that Williamson had suffered a full tear of his ulnar collateral ligament and would undergo Tommy John surgery. The procedure ruled him out for the remainder of 2024, as well as the entirety of the 2025 season.

On April 30, 2026, Williamson was placed on the injured list due to left shoulder fatigue. On May 6, he was transferred to the 60-day injured list. Williamson was activated from the injured list on September 1.
