= Zach Maxwell =

American baseball player (born 2001)

Cincinnati Reds – No. 78
- Pitcher
- Born: January 26, 2001 (age 25); Nashville, Tennessee, U.S.
- Bats: Right Throws: Right

MLB debut
- August 23, 2025, for the Cincinnati Reds

MLB statistics (through August 20, 2026)
- Win–loss record: 0–1
- Earned run average: 6.65
- Strikeouts: 25
- Stats at Baseball Reference

Teams
- Cincinnati Reds (2025–present)

Zachary Thomas Maxwell (born January 26, 2001) is an American professional baseball pitcher for the Cincinnati Reds of Major League Baseball (MLB). He made his MLB debut in 2025.

== Amateur career ==
Maxwell attended North Paulding High School in Dallas, Georgia. He was drafted by the New York Yankees in the 30th round of the 2019 Major League Baseball draft but did not sign with them and played college baseball at Georgia Tech. In 2021, he played collegiate summer baseball with the Chatham Anglers of the Cape Cod Baseball League.

== Professional career ==
After three years at Georgia Tech, Maxwell was drafted (183rd overall) by the Cincinnati Reds in the sixth round of the 2022 MLB draft. He signed with the Reds and spent his first professional season with the rookie-level Arizona Complex League Reds and Single-A Daytona Tortugas. Maxwell started 2023 with Daytona before being promoted to the High-A Dayton Dragons. After the season, he played in the Arizona Fall League.

Maxwell split the 2024 campaign between the Double-A Chattanooga Lookouts and Triple-A Louisville Bats. In 53 relief appearances split between the two affiliates, he compiled a combined 7-2 record and 3.17 ERA with 85 strikeouts and five saves over 54 innings of work.

Maxwell made 51 appearances for Louisville to begin the 2025 season, compiling a 1-3 record and 4.17 ERA with 59 strikeouts and five saves across 49 2/3 innings pitched. On August 22, 2025, Maxwell was selected to the 40-man roster and promoted to the major leagues for the first time.

Maxwell was optioned to Triple-A Louisville to begin the 2026 season.
