= Connor Phillips =

American baseball player (born 2001)

Cincinnati Reds – No. 34
- Pitcher
- Born: May 4, 2001 (age 25); Houston, Texas, U.S.
- Bats: Right Throws: Right

MLB debut
- September 5, 2023, for the Cincinnati Reds

MLB statistics (through 2026 season)
- Win–loss record: 8–1
- Earned run average: 5.00
- Strikeouts: 87
- Stats at Baseball Reference

Teams
- Cincinnati Reds (2023, 2025–present)

Connor Allan Phillips (born May 4, 2001) is an American professional baseball pitcher for the Cincinnati Reds of Major League Baseball (MLB). He made his MLB debut in 2023.

== Amateur career ==
Phillips attended Magnolia West High School in Magnolia, Texas, where he played baseball and went 12–3 with a 1.13 ERA and 125 strikeouts over 92 2/3 innings as a senior in 2019. He was selected by the Toronto Blue Jays in the 35th round of the 2019 Major League Baseball draft but did not sign. He had originally signed to play college baseball for the LSU Tigers, but instead enrolled at McLennan Community College so he would be eligible for the draft after his freshman year. As a freshman at McLennan in 2020, he made six starts and went 3–1 with a 3.16 ERA over 25 2/3 innings before the season was cancelled due to the COVID-19 pandemic.

== Professional career ==
=== Seattle Mariners ===
The Seattle Mariners selected Phillips with the 64th overall selection of the 2020 Major League Baseball draft. He signed for $1.1 million. He made his professional debut in 2021 with the Modesto Nuts and was promoted to the Everett AquaSox at the season's end. Over 17 starts between the two clubs, he went 7–4 with a 4.62 ERA, 111 strikeouts, and 46 walks over 76 innings.

=== Cincinnati Reds ===
On March 29, 2022, the Mariners sent Phillips to the Cincinnati Reds as the player to be named later from an earlier trade that also sent Justin Dunn, Jake Fraley, and Brandon Williamson to the Reds in exchange for Jesse Winker and Eugenio Suárez. He was assigned to the Dayton Dragons to open the 2022 season. In late June, he was promoted to the Chattanooga Lookouts. Over 24 starts between the two teams, Philips went 5–8 with a 3.78 ERA and 150 strikeouts over 109 2/3 innings. Phillips returned to Chattanooga to open the 2023 season. In late June, Phillips was promoted to the Louisville Bats. In 25 games (24 starts) between the two affiliates, he logged a cumulative 4–5 record and 3.86 ERA with 154 strikeouts in 105 innings of work.

On September 2, 2023, Phillips was selected to the 40-man roster and promoted to the major leagues for the first time after Brandon Williamson was placed on the COVID-19 injured list. Across five starts during his rookie campaign, he struggled to a 6.97 ERA with 26 strikeouts across 20 2/3 innings pitched.

Phillips was optioned to Louisville to begin the 2024 season. He did not make an appearance for Cincinnati during the season and played the entirety of the season with the Bats. In 19 starts for Louisville, he struggled to a 3–9 record and 8.01 ERA with 77 strikeouts across 78 2/3 innings pitched.

Phillips was again optioned to Louisville to begin the 2025 season. He suffered a minor injury during spring training and was moved to the bullpen. The injury was later announced to be a diagnosis of thoracic outlet syndrome, which Phillips managed with botox injections as opposed to surgery. He was recalled to the Reds twice during the year, and appeared in 21 games as a reliever, going 5–0 with a 2.88 ERA and 32 strikeouts over 25 innings. With Louisville, he went 1–2 with a 2.84 ERA across 38 innings.

In 2026, Phillips was named to Cincinnati's Opening Day roster. On May 23, he was optioned to Louisville. Phillips made 27 relief appearances for the Reds and had a 0–2 record, a 5.40 ERA, 29 strikeouts, and 31 walks across 30 innings pitched. He pitched in 31 games for Louisville and went 2–2 with a 5.06 ERA and 51 strikeouts across 37 1/3 innings.
