= Kyle Nicolas =

American baseball player (born 1999)

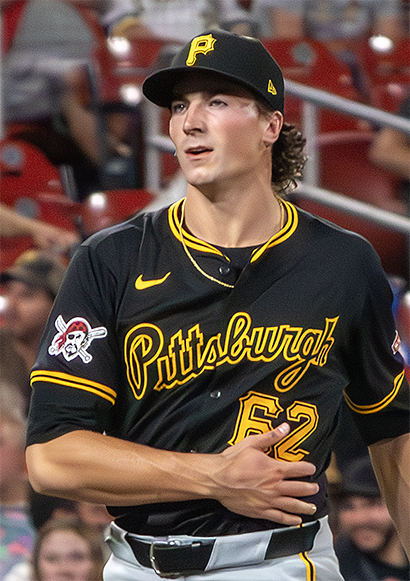
- Nicolas with the Pittsburgh Pirates

Free agent
- Pitcher
- Born: February 22, 1999 (age 27); Massillon, Ohio, U.S.
- Bats: Right Throws: Right

MLB debut
- September 19, 2023, for the Pittsburgh Pirates

MLB statistics (through 2026 season)
- Win–loss record: 4–4
- Earned run average: 4.96
- Strikeouts: 103
- Stats at Baseball Reference

Teams
- Pittsburgh Pirates (2023–2025); Cincinnati Reds (2026)

Kyle Todd Nicolas (born February 22, 1999) is an American professional baseball pitcher who is a free agent. He has previously played in Major League Baseball (MLB) for the Pittsburgh Pirates and Cincinnati Reds. He made his MLB debut in 2023.

== Amateur career ==
Nicolas grew up in Massillon, Ohio and attended Jackson High School, where he played baseball and basketball. He won state titles in both sports as a senior and was named the Federal League Co-Player of the Year in baseball after going 8–0 with a save and a 0.50 ERA on the mound while also batting .349 with 24 RBIs. He was teammates with fellow major leaguer Dillon Dingler.

Nicolas played for the Ball State Cardinals for three seasons. In 2019, he played collegiate summer baseball with the Cotuit Kettleers of the Cape Cod Baseball League. As a junior, Nicolas went 0–1 with a 2.74 ERA in four starts before the season was cut short due to the coronavirus pandemic.

== Professional career ==
=== Miami Marlins ===
Nicolas was selected 61st overall by the Miami Marlins in the 2020 Major League Baseball draft. He did not play in a game in 2020 due to the cancellation of the minor league season because of the COVID-19 pandemic.

Nicolas began the 2021 season with the High-A Beloit Snappers. Nicolas was promoted to the Double-A Pensacola Blue Wahoos after posting 3–2 record with a 5.28 ERA and 86 strikeouts in 59 2/3 innings with Beloit.

=== Pittsburgh Pirates ===
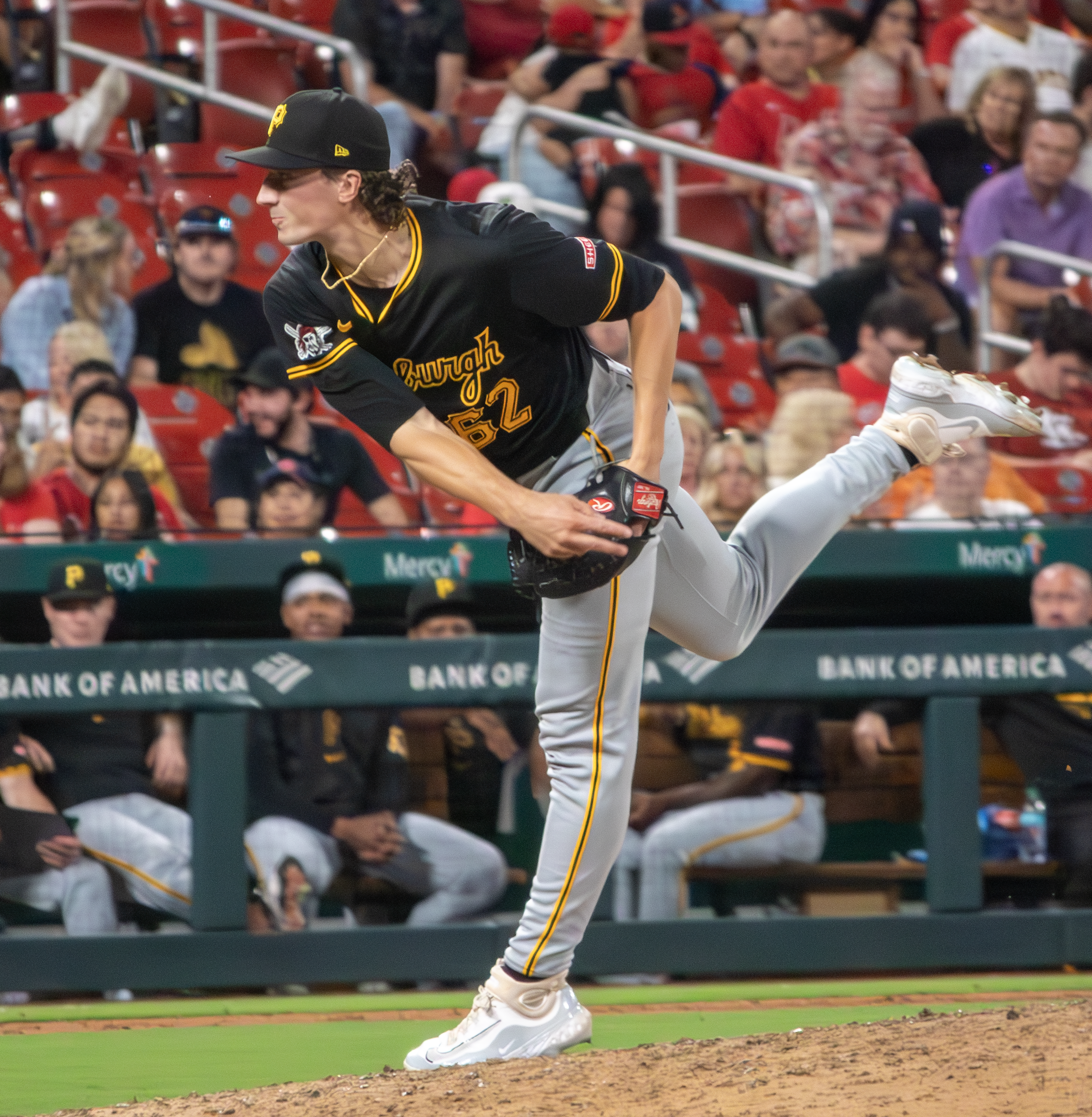
Kyle Nicolas pitches in St.Louis, 2024.

On November 29, 2021, Nicolas was traded along with Zach Thompson and Connor Scott to the Pittsburgh Pirates in exchange for Jacob Stallings. He spent the 2022 season with the Double–A Altoona Curve, making 24 appearances (22 starts) and posting a 3.97 ERA with 101 strikeouts across 90 2/3 innings pitched.

In 2023, Nicolas made 35 appearances (18 starts) split between Double–A Altoona and the Triple–A Indianapolis Indians, registering a cumulative 4–7 record and 5.20 ERA with 127 strikeouts and 2 saves in 98 2/3 innings pitched. On September 19, 2023, Nicolas had his contract selected to the 40-man roster and promoted to the major leagues for the first time. In 4 appearances during his rookie campaign, he struggled to an 11.81 ERA with 7 strikeouts across 5 1/3 innings pitched.

Nicolas was optioned to Triple–A Indianapolis to begin the 2024 season. He made 51 appearances for Pittsburgh in 2024, compiling a 2-2 record and 3.95 ERA with 55 strikeouts across 54 2/3 innings pitched.

Nicolas was again optioned to Triple-A Indianapolis to begin the 2025 season. He made 31 total appearances for Pittsburgh during the year, compiling a 1-2 record and 4.74 ERA with 34 strikeouts over 38 innings of work.

=== Cincinnati Reds ===
On March 4, 2026, the Pirates traded Nicolas to the Cincinnati Reds in exchange for Tyler Callihan. He was optioned to the Triple-A Louisville Bats to begin the regular season. Nicolas made seven appearances for the Reds, recording an 8.59 ERA with seven strikeouts across 7 1/3 innings pitched. On May 30, Nicolas was designated for assignment by Cincinnati.

=== Baltimore Orioles ===
On June 4, 2026, Nicolas was traded to the Baltimore Orioles in exchange for cash considerations. He made six appearances for the Triple-A Norfolk Tides, posting a 1-0 record and 6.23 ERA with six strikeouts across 4 1/3 innings pitched. Nicolas was designated for assignment by the Orioles on June 27.

=== Washington Nationals ===
On July 1, 2026, Nicolas was traded to the Washington Nationals in exchange for infielder Randal Diaz. He was designated for assignment on November 6, following the acquisition of Reiver Sanmartin. He was released on November 13.

== Personal life ==
Nicolas is the nephew of former Penn State and NFL quarterback Todd Blackledge.
