= Julian Garcia (baseball) =

American baseball player (born 1995)

Cincinnati Reds – No. 57
- Pitcher
- Born: May 13, 1995 (age 31); Fort Collins, Colorado, U.S.
- Bats: Left Throws: Right

MLB debut
- June 23, 2026, for the Cincinnati Reds

MLB statistics (through 2026 season)
- Win-loss record: 2-3
- Earned run average: 3.13
- Strikeouts: 41
- Stats at Baseball Reference

Teams
- Cincinnati Reds (2026–present)

Julian Robert Garcia (born May 13, 1995) is an American professional baseball pitcher for the Cincinnati Reds of Major League Baseball (MLB).

== Career ==
Garcia played college baseball at Metropolitan State University of Denver. He was selected by the Philadelphia Phillies in the 10th round of the 2016 Major League Baseball draft. He pitched in the Phillies organization until 2022. After not playing in 2023, Garcia pitched for the Kansas City Monarchs of the American Association of Professional Baseball in 2024 and 2025. He signed a minor league deal with the Cincinnati Reds in 2025.

Garcia was called up to the majors for the first time on June 21, 2026.
