= Tony Santillan =

American baseball player (born 1997)

Cincinnati Reds – No. 64
- Pitcher
- Born: April 15, 1997 (age 29); Fort Worth, Texas, U.S.
- Bats: Right Throws: Right

MLB debut
- June 13, 2021, for the Cincinnati Reds

MLB statistics (through 2026 season)
- Win–loss record: 9–16
- Earned run average: 3.67
- Strikeouts: 235
- Stats at Baseball Reference

Teams
- Cincinnati Reds (2021–present)

Antonio C. Santillan (born April 15, 1997) is an American professional baseball pitcher for the Cincinnati Reds of Major League Baseball (MLB). He made his MLB debut in 2021.

== Amateur career ==
Santillan attended Seguin High School in Arlington, Texas. He committed to play college baseball at Texas Tech University. He was selected by the Cincinnati Reds in the second round of the 2015 Major League Baseball draft.

== Professional career ==
After signing, Santillan made his professional debut with the Arizona League Reds and spent all of his first professional season there, pitching to an 0–2 record and 5.03 ERA in 19 2/3 innings pitched. He pitched 2016 with both the Billings Mustangs and Dayton Dragons, compiling a combined 3–3 record, 5.19 ERA, and 1.43 WHIP in 15 games started between both teams, and spent 2017 back with Dayton, posting a 9–8 record and 3.38 ERA in 25 games (24 starts). He started 2018 with the Daytona Tortugas and was promoted to the Double–A Pensacola Blue Wahoos during the season. In 26 combined starts between the two clubs, he was 10–7 with a 3.08 ERA and a 1.23 WHIP. He spent 2019 with the Chattanooga Lookouts, going 2–8 with a 4.84 ERA over 21 starts, striking out 92 over 102 1/3 innings.

On November 20, 2019, the Reds added Santillan to their 40-man roster to protect him from the Rule 5 draft. He did not play in a game in 2020 due to the cancellation of the minor league season because of the COVID-19 pandemic. On June 12, 2021, Santillan was promoted to the major leagues for the first time. Santillan made his MLB debut the next day as the starting pitcher against the Colorado Rockies, pitching 4 2/3 innings of 1-run ball with 5 strikeouts. He recorded his first career strikeout versus Rockies shortstop Trevor Story. He finished his debut campaign making 26 appearances and posting a 1–3 record and 2.91 ERA with 56 strikeouts in 43.1 innings pitched. In 2022, Santillan pitched in 21 games for the Reds, registering a 5.49 ERA with 21 strikeouts in 19.2 innings of work. He was placed on the 60-day injured list with a lower-back strain on July 4, 2022, and was later ruled out for the remainder of the season.

On April 28, 2023, Santillan was placed on the 60-day injured list. He had initially began the year on the injured list with a back injury, but suffered a knee injury while on rehab assignment, thus extending his stay. Santillan was activated from the injured list on July 6. In 3 games for the Reds, he logged a 2.70 ERA with 1 strikeout in 3 1/3 innings pitched. On August 29, Santillan was designated for assignment by Cincinnati. He cleared waivers and was sent outright to Triple–A Louisville on September 1. He re-signed with Cincinnati on a new minor league contract on November 9.

Santillan began the 2024 campaign with Triple–A Louisville. In 38 relief appearances, he compiled a 3.49 ERA with 53 strikeouts and 16 saves across 38 2/3 innings pitched. On July 13, 2024, the Reds selected Santillan's contract, adding him to their active roster.

Santillan made 44 appearances for Cincinnati during the 2026 season, struggling to a 3–4 record and 6.42 ERA with 36 strikeouts and five saves across 40 2/3 innings pitched. On September 23, 2026, it was announced that Santillan would require hip labrum surgery, ending his season.
