= Nick Lodolo =

American baseball player (born 1998)

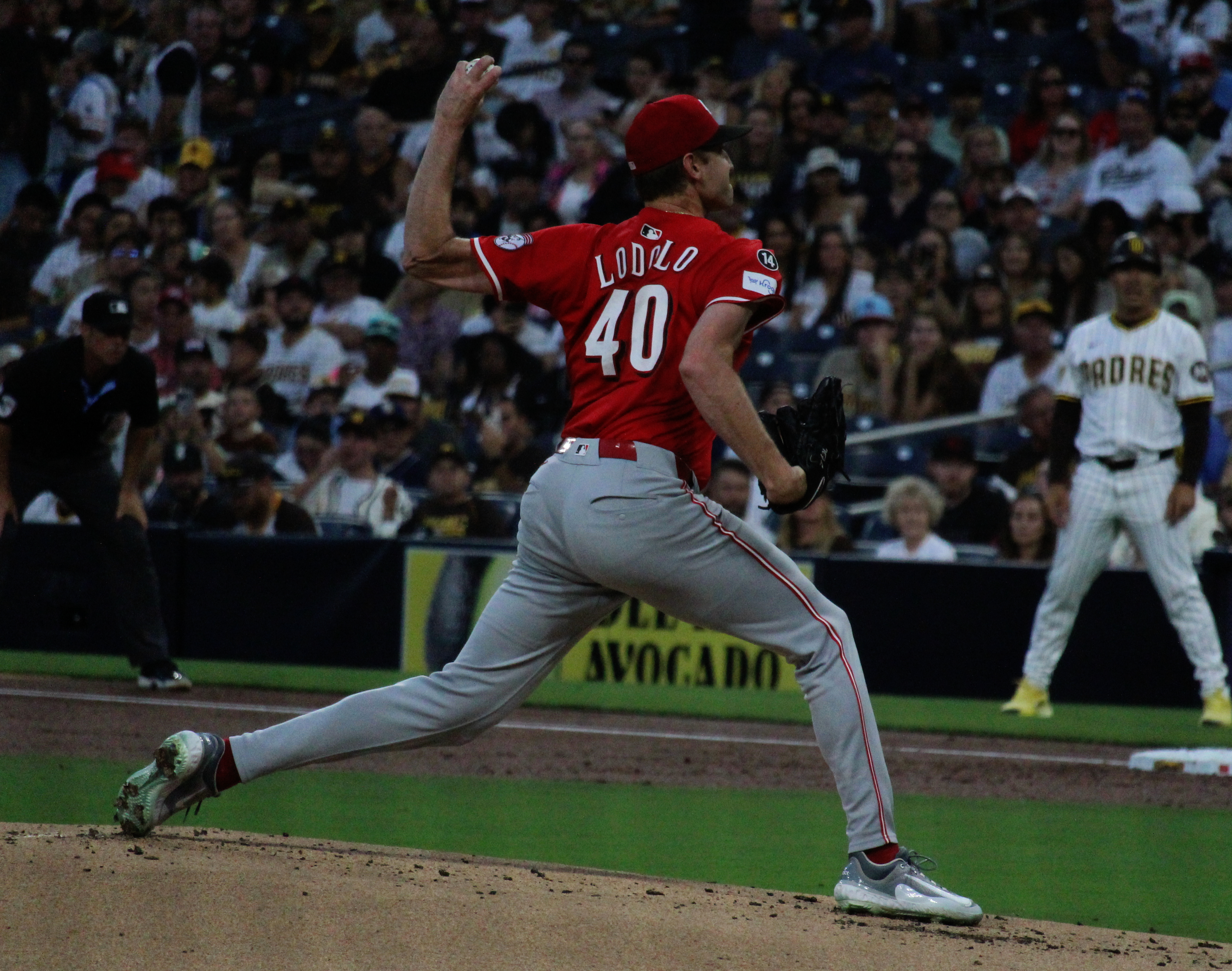
- Lodolo with the Cincinnati Reds in 2025

Cincinnati Reds – No. 40
- Pitcher
- Born: February 5, 1998 (age 28); La Verne, California, U.S.
- Bats: Left Throws: Left

MLB debut
- April 13, 2022, for the Cincinnati Reds

MLB statistics (through 2026 season)
- Win–loss record: 27–28
- Earned run average: 4.25
- Strikeouts: 539
- Stats at Baseball Reference

Teams
- Cincinnati Reds (2022–present)

Nicholas Frank Lodolo (/loʊˈdoʊloʊ/ loh-DOH-loh; born February 5, 1998) is an American professional baseball pitcher for the Cincinnati Reds of Major League Baseball (MLB). He made his MLB debut in 2022.

== Amateur career ==
Lodolo attended Damien High School in La Verne, California, and played for the school's baseball team as a pitcher. As a senior, he had a 8–2 win–loss record with a 1.97 earned run average (ERA), striking out 83 batters in 65 innings pitched. After his senior year, the Pittsburgh Pirates selected Lodolo with the 41st overall pick in the 2016 Major League Baseball draft. However, he did not sign and instead chose to fulfill his commitment to attend Texas Christian University (TCU) and play college baseball for the TCU Horned Frogs.

As a freshman at TCU in 2017, Lodolo appeared in 17 games (15 starts) where he compiled a 5–1 record with a 4.35 ERA. He was named to the All-Big 12 Second Team as well as to the All-Freshman Team. In 2018, as a sophomore, he went 7–4 with a 4.32 ERA, striking out 93 batters in 77 innings over 16 games (15 starts) and was named to the All-Big 12 Second Team once again. Prior to the 2019 season, Lodolo was named to the Preseason All-Big 12 Team. Lodolo finished his junior season with a 6–6 record and a 2.36 ERA, striking out 131 in 103 innings. He was named to the All-Big 12 First Team. In his college career, he was 18–11 with a 3.55 ERA in 258 2/3 innings, in which he struck out 296 batters.

== Professional career ==
=== Minor leagues ===
Lodolo was considered one of the top prospects for the 2019 Major League Baseball draft. He was selected by the Cincinnati Reds with the seventh overall pick. He signed for $5.43 million, and was assigned to the Billings Mustangs of the Rookie Advanced Pioneer League. After six starts with Billings, he was promoted to the Dayton Dragons of the Single-A Midwest League in July. Following two starts with Dayton, Lodolo reached his innings limit, and was shut down for the remainder of the year. Over eight starts between Billings and Dayton, he pitched to a 0–1 record with a 2.45 ERA, striking out 30 in 18 1/3 innings.

Lodolo did not play a minor league game in 2020 due to the cancellation of the minor league season caused by the COVID-19 pandemic. To begin the 2021 season, he was assigned to the Chattanooga Lookouts of the Double-A South. He was named the league's Player of the Month in May after compiling a 1.01 ERA with 38 strikeouts and a 0.83 WHIP over 26 2/3 innings. On June 15, he was placed on the injured list due to a blister on a finger on his left hand, and was activated a few weeks later. That same month, Lodolo was selected to play in the All-Star Futures Game at Coors Field. Over ten starts with the Lookouts, he went 2–1 with a 1.84 ERA and 68 strikeouts over 44 innings. In early August, he was promoted to the Louisville Bats of the Triple-A East. He was placed back on the injured list in late August with a shoulder strain, and missed the remainder of the season. Over three starts with Louisville, Lodolo went 0-1 and gave up four earned runs and two walks while striking out ten over 6 2/3 innings.

=== Major leagues ===
On April 13, 2022, the Reds selected Lodolo's contract and promoted him to the major leagues. He made his MLB debut that day as the starting pitcher versus the Cleveland Guardians. Over four innings, he allowed five earned runs on seven hits (two home runs), three walks, and four strikeouts, taking the loss as the Reds fell 7–3. After three starts, he was placed on the injured list with a back strain. In 2022, Lodolo started 19 games for the Reds and went 4–7 with a 3.66 ERA in 103 1/3 innings, and led the majors in hit batsmen, with 19. He also came in sixth in Rookie of the Year voting.

To begin the 2023 season, Lodolo made seven starts for the Reds, struggling to a 6.29 ERA with 47 strikeouts in 34 1/3 innings pitched. On May 13, Lodolo was scratched from a scheduled start against the Miami Marlins with what was described as a lingering ankle/calf injury. An MRI of his left leg revealed a stress reaction in his tibia, and he was placed on the 60-day injured list on June 3. On August 31, it was announced that Lodolo would miss the remainder of the season.

During the 2024 season, Lodolo was placed on the injured list four separate times during the season with left calf tenosynovitis, a left groin strain, a left finger blister, and a sprained left middle finger. Lodolo still started 21 games for the Reds and posted a 9–8 record, a 4.76 ERA and 122 strikeouts over 115 1/3 innings.

Lodolo appeared in a career-high 29 games (28 starts) for the Reds in 2025. On July 23, 2025, he recorded his first career complete-game shutout against the Washington Nationals in a 5–0 victory. He was placed on the injured list once during the season, missing approximately three weeks in August, with a left finger blister. Across 29 games, Lodolo had a 9-8 record, a 3.33 ERA, and 156 strikeouts over 156 2/3 innings and was tied for the major league lead in complete games (2) and shutouts (1).

Lodolo was named Cincinnati's number two starter prior to the 2026 season. He opened the season on the injured list with a blister on his left finger. The injury occurred during his final start of spring training. He was activated from the injured list on May 8, 2026, and made his season debut that night at Great American Ball Park versus the Houston Astros, giving up four earned runs across 5 1/3 innings in a 10-0 Reds loss. On July 12, 2026, Lodolo was, once again, placed on the injured list for a blister. He was activated on August 11. Lodolo made 21 starts for the Reds and ended the season with a 3–6 record, a 4.97 ERA and 83 strikeouts over 108 2/3 innings.
