= 2024 Cincinnati Reds season =

2024 Cincinnati Reds
- League: National League
- Division: Central
- Ballpark: Great American Ball Park
- City: Cincinnati, Ohio
- Record: 77–85 (.475)
- Divisional place: 4th
- Owners: Bob Castellini
- General managers: Nick Krall
- Managers: David Bell (until Sep. 22); Freddie Benavides (from Sep. 23 onward)
- Television: Bally Sports Ohio; WLWT (home opener)
- Radio: WLW (700 AM); Reds Radio Network
- Stats: ESPN.com; Baseball Reference

The 2024 Cincinnati Reds season was the 155th season for the franchise in Major League Baseball, and their 22nd at Great American Ball Park in Cincinnati. The Reds failed to improve on their 82-80 record from 2023 and would fire Manager David Bell on September 22.

It was the first season since 2006 without Joey Votto on the roster, as he signed a minor league contract with the Toronto Blue Jays in March, before he announced his retirement on August 21.

== Off-season ==
=== 2024 Major League Baseball Draft Lottery ===
The Cincinnati Reds will have the second overall pick at the 2024 Major League Baseball draft, after the team moved up from what was expected to be the 13th overall selection. The Reds had a 0.9% chance of winning the top pick at the start of the lottery. The draft took place in July 2024 in Arlington, Texas. The Reds selected RHP Chase Burns of the Wake Forest Demon Deacons with their first selection.

=== Transactions ===
==== October 2023 ====
October 2	Activated CF Harrison Bader, C Curt Casali and SS Matt McLain from the 10-day injured list. Activated RHP's Tejay Antone and Daniel Duarte from the 15-day injured list. Recalled RHP's Levi Stoudt, Lyon Richardson, Casey Legumina and Brett Kennedy, CF TJ Hopkins and SS José Barrero from Louisville Bats. Recalled RHP Carson Spiers from ACL Reds.
October 9	Sent RHP's Alan Busenitz, Connor Overton, Vladimir Gutiérrez, Brett Kennedy and Justin Dunn outright to Louisville Bats.
October 18	Sent RHP Ben Lively outright to Louisville Bats.
October 26	Claimed OF Bubba Thompson off waivers from Kansas City Royals.

==== November 2023 ====
November 2	Re-signed free agent RHP Tony Santillan to a minor league contract and invited him to spring training. RHP Buck Farmer elected free agency - (re-signed a one-year, $2.25 million contract on December 28); CF Harrison Bader elected free agency - (signed a one-year, $10.5 million contract with New York Mets on January 5).
November 4	C Curt Casali elected free agency - (signed a minor league contract with Miami Marlins on February 13). 1B Joey Votto elected free agency - (signed a minor league contract with Toronto Blue Jays on March 9).
November 6	Activated RHP Graham Ashcraft and LHP's Nick Lodolo and Reiver Sanmartin from the 60-day injured list.
November 13	Signed free agent C P.J. Higgins from Chicago Cubs to a minor league contract and invited him to spring training.
November 14	Selected the contracts of RHP Christian Roa and OF Jacob Hurtubise from Louisville Bats. Selected the contract of OF Rece Hinds from Chattanooga Lookouts.
November 17	RHP Derek Law elected free agency - (signed a minor league contract with Washington Nationals on February 21). OF Nick Senzel elected free agency - (signed a one-year, $2 million contract with Washington Nationals on December 13). LHP Reiver Sanmartin elected free agency - (signed a minor league contract with Cincinnati Reds on November 19).
November 19	Re-signed free agent LHP Reiver Sanmartin to a minor league contract.
November 22	Signed free agent 2B Alex Blandino to a minor league contract.
November 29	Signed free agent 2B Mark Mathias from San Francisco Giants to a minor league contract.

==== December 2023 ====
December 1	Signed free agent RHP Emilio Pagán from Minnesota Twins to a two-year, $16 million contract. Signed free agent RHP Nick Martinez from San Diego Padres to a two-year, $26 million contract.
December 5	Signed free agent 2B Erik González from Chicago White Sox to a minor league contract.
December 7	Signed international free agent LHP Ryjeteri Merite from Netherlands to a minor league contract.
December 11	Signed free agent 3B Jeimer Candelario from Chicago Cubs to a three-year, $45 million contract. Signed international free agent RHP Samuel Pérez from Panama to a minor league contract.
December 12	Signed international free agent OF Drew Davies from Australia to a minor league contract.
December 14	Signed free agent C Austin Wynns from the Colorado Rockies to a one-year, $950,000 contract. Signed international free agent RHP Carlos Zambrano from Venezuela to a minor league contract. Signed international free agent RHP Deivid Burgos from Dominican Republic to a minor league contract. Signed free agent RHP Peyton Gray from Algodoneros de Guasave (Mexican Pacific League) to a minor league contract.
December 15	Signed international free agent RHP Moisés Castillo from Panama to a minor league contract. Signed international free agent RHP Luís Pimentel from Dominican Republic to a minor league contract.
December 19	Traded CF TJ Hopkins to San Francisco Giants for a player to be named later. Signed free agent C John Michael Faile from the Billings Mustangs (Pioneer League) to a minor league contract.
December 20	Re-signed free agent RHP Brett Kennedy to a minor league contract. Signed free agent RHP Brooks Kriske from the Kansas City Royals to a minor league contract.
December 26	Signed free agent CF Conner Capel from Oakland Athletics to a minor league contract and invited him to spring training.
December 28	Re-signed free agent RHP Buck Farmer to a one-year, $2.25 million contract. Designated OF Bubba Thompson for assignment.

==== January 2024 ====
January 2	Signed free agent RHP Frankie Montas from New York Yankees to a one-year, $16 million contract. Designated C Austin Wynns for assignment.
January 3	Re-signed free agent RHP Alan Busenitz to a minor league contract. Signed free agent LHP Justin Bruihl from Colorado Rockies to a minor league contract and invited him to spring training. Invited non-roster LHP Reiver Sanmartin to spring training. Invited non-roster LHP Jacob Heatherly to spring training. Invited non-roster RHP Brooks Kriske to spring training.
January 4	Sent C Austin Wynns outright to Louisville Bats and invited him to spring training. OF Bubba Thompson claimed off waivers by New York Yankees.
January 11	Invited non-roster SS Edwin Arroyo to spring training. Invited non-roster RHP Julian Aguiar to spring training. Invited non-roster RHP Rhett Lowder to spring training. Invited non-roster RHP Chase Petty to spring training. Invited non-roster OF Blake Dunn to spring training. Invited non-roster 2B Tyler Callihan to spring training. Invited non-roster RHP Zach Maxwell to spring training. Invited non-roster C Michael Trautwein to spring training.
January 13	Signed free agent LHP Brent Suter from Colorado Rockies to a one-year, $3 million contract. Designated RHP Daniel Duarte for assignment.
January 15	Signed international free agent 2B Riangelo Richardson from Aruba to a minor league contract. Signed international free agent SS Shendrion Martinus from Curaçao to a minor league contract. Signed international free agent RHP Erlin Aguero from Dominican Republic to a minor league contract. Signed international free agent OF Pablo Núñez from Venezuela to a minor league contract. Signed international free agent RHP Franyer Mendez from Venezuela to a minor league contract. Signed international free agent 3B Juan Brown of Aruba to a minor league contract. Signed international free agent C Jirvin Morillo of Venezuela to a minor league contract. Signed international free agent RHP Dennis Díaz from Dominican Republic to a minor league contract. Signed international free agent RHP Stharlin Torres from Dominican Republic to a minor league contract. Signed international free agent RHP Jhan Almeida from Venezuela to a minor league contract. Signed international free agent OF Jaset Martinez of Venezuela to a minor league contract. Signed international free agent RHP Manuel Marchan from Venezuela to a minor league contract. Signed international free agent OF Peson Revierre of Curaçao to a minor league contract. Signed international free agent SS Diorland Zambrano from Venezuela to a minor league contract. Signed international free agent SS Naibel Mariano from Dominican Republic to a minor league contract.
January 16	Traded RHP Daniel Durate to Texas Rangers for cash.
January 17	Signed free agent LHP Tyler Gilbert from Arizona Diamondbacks to a minor league contract and invited him to spring training.
January 23	Signed free agent LHP Jonah Hurney from Trenton Thunder (MLBD) to a minor league contract. Invited non-roster C Daniel Vellojin to spring training. Invited non-roster C Matheu Nelson to spring training.

==== February 2024 ====
February 6	Signed free agent 2B Josh Harrison from Texas Rangers to a minor league contract and invited him to spring training.
February 13	Claimed OF Bubba Thompson off waivers from Minnesota Twins. Designated RHP Levi Stoudt for assignment.
February 17	Seattle Mariners claimed RHP Levi Stoudt off waivers.
February 24	Signed free agent LF Tony Kemp from Oakland Athletics to a minor league contract and invited him to spring training. Signed free agent 1B Mike Ford from Seattle Mariners to a minor league contract and invited him to spring training.

==== March 2024 ====
March 8	Placed SS Noelvi Marte on the restricted list. Optioned RHP Christian Roa to Louisville Bats. Optioned RHP Casey Legumina to Louisville Bats. Optioned RHP Carson Spiers to Louisville Bats. Optioned OF Rece Hinds to Louisville Bats. Optioned OF Jacob Hurtubise to Louisville Bats.
March 9	Texas Rangers claimed SS José Barrero off waivers. Optioned RHP Lyon Richardson to Louisville Bats.
March 13	Optioned OF Bubba Thompson to Louisville Bats. Optioned RHP Connor Phillips to Louisville Bats.
March 15	Signed free agent LHP Justin Wilson from Los Angeles Dodgers to a one-year, $1.5 million contract.
March 19	Signed international free agent RHP Michael Gil from Dominican Republic to a minor league contract. Signed international free agent RHP Ayendy Pena from Dominican Republic to a minor league contract.
March 20	Acquired 2B Santiago Espinal from Toronto Blue Jays for RHP Chris McElvain.

== Standings ==
=== National League Central ===
NL Central
Team	W	L	Pct.	GB	Home	Road
Milwaukee Brewers	93	69	.574	—	47‍–‍34	46‍–‍35
St. Louis Cardinals	83	79	.512	10	44‍–‍37	39‍–‍42
Chicago Cubs	83	79	.512	10	44‍–‍37	39‍–‍42
Cincinnati Reds	77	85	.475	16	39‍–‍42	38‍–‍43
Pittsburgh Pirates	76	86	.469	17	39‍–‍42	37‍–‍44

=== National League Wild Card ===
Division leaders
Team	W	L	Pct.
Los Angeles Dodgers	98	64	.605
Philadelphia Phillies	95	67	.586
Milwaukee Brewers	93	69	.574

Wild Card teams (Top 3 teams qualify for postseason)
Team	W	L	Pct.	GB
San Diego Padres	93	69	.574	+4
Atlanta Braves	89	73	.549	—
New York Mets	89	73	.549	—
Arizona Diamondbacks	89	73	.549	—
St. Louis Cardinals	83	79	.512	6
Chicago Cubs	83	79	.512	6
San Francisco Giants	80	82	.494	9
Cincinnati Reds	77	85	.475	12
Pittsburgh Pirates	76	86	.469	13
Washington Nationals	71	91	.438	18
Miami Marlins	62	100	.383	27
Colorado Rockies	61	101	.377	28

=== Record vs. opponents ===
==== Record vs. National League ====
2024 National League record Source: MLB Standings Grid – 2024
Team	AZ	ATL	CHC	CIN	COL	LAD	MIA	MIL	NYM	PHI	PIT	SD	SF	STL	WSH	AL
Arizona	—	2–5	3–3	5–1	9–4	6–7	4–2	4–3	3–4	4–3	4–2	6–7	7–6	3–3	5–1	24–22
Atlanta	5–2	—	4–2	2–4	3–3	2–5	9–4	2–4	7–6	7–6	3–3	3–4	4–3	2–4	5–8	31–15
Chicago	3–3	2–4	—	5–8	4–2	4–2	4–3	5–8	3–4	2–4	7–6	2–4	3–4	6–7	6–1	27–19
Cincinnati	1–5	4–2	8–5	—	6–1	4–3	5–2	4–9	2–4	4–3	5–8	2–4	2–4	7–6	2–4	21–25
Colorado	4–9	3–3	2–4	1–6	—	3–10	2–5	4–3	2–4	2–4	2–4	8–5	3–10	3–4	2–4	20–26
Los Angeles	7–6	5–2	2–4	3–4	10–3	—	5–1	4–3	4–2	1–5	4–2	5–8	9–4	5–2	4–2	30–16
Miami	2–4	4–9	3–4	2–5	5–2	1–5	—	4–2	6–7	6–7	0–7	2–4	3–3	3–3	2–11	19–27
Milwaukee	3–4	4–2	8–5	9–4	3–4	3–4	2–4	—	5–1	2–4	7–6	2–5	4–2	8–5	2–4	31–15
New York	4–3	6–7	4–3	4–2	4–2	2–4	7–6	1–5	—	6–7	5–2	5–2	2–4	4–2	11–2	24–22
Philadelphia	3–4	6–7	4–2	3–4	4–2	5–1	7–6	4–2	7–6	—	3–4	5–1	5–2	4–2	9–4	26–20
Pittsburgh	2–4	3–3	6–7	8–5	4–2	2–4	7–0	6–7	2–5	4–3	—	0–6	2–4	5–8	4–3	20–26
San Diego	7–6	4–3	4–2	4–2	5–8	8–5	4–2	5–2	2–5	1–5	6–0	—	7–6	3–4	6–0	27–19
San Francisco	6–7	3–4	4–3	4–2	10–3	4–9	3–3	2–4	4–2	2–5	4–2	6–7	—	1–5	4–3	23–23
St. Louis	3–3	4–2	7–6	6–7	4–3	2–5	3–3	5–8	2–4	2–4	8–5	4–3	5–1	—	4–3	24–22
Washington	1–5	8–5	1–6	4–2	4–2	2–4	11–2	4–2	2–11	4–9	3–4	0–6	3–4	3–4	—	21–25

Updated with the results of all games through September 30, 2024.

==== Record vs. American League ====
2024 National League record vs. American League Source: MLB Standings
Team	BAL	BOS	CWS	CLE	DET	HOU	KC	LAA	MIN	NYY	OAK	SEA	TB	TEX	TOR
Arizona	1–2	3–0	2–1	3–0	1–2	1–2	2–1	2–1	1–2	1–2	2–1	1–2	0–3	2–2	2–1
Atlanta	1–2	3–1	1–2	2–1	3–0	3–0	2–1	2–1	3–0	2–1	2–1	1–2	2–1	2–1	2–1
Chicago	3–0	1–2	4–0	0–3	2–1	3–0	2–1	2–1	2–1	1–2	1–2	2–1	1–2	1–2	2–1
Cincinnati	0–3	1–2	3–0	1–3	0–3	3–0	0–3	3–0	2–1	3–0	1–2	0–3	1–2	1–2	2–1
Colorado	1–2	2–1	1–2	2–1	1–2	0–4	2–1	2–1	1–2	1–2	1–2	1–2	1–2	3–0	1–2
Los Angeles	2–1	3–0	3–0	2–1	1–2	1–2	2–1	2–2	2–1	2–1	2–1	3–0	2–1	1–2	2–1
Miami	2–1	0–3	2–1	1–2	2–1	0–3	1–2	0–3	2–1	1–2	1–2	2–1	1–3	1–2	3–0
Milwaukee	2–1	2–1	3–0	3–0	2–1	1–2	1–2	2–1	3–1	1–2	2–1	2–1	2–1	3–0	2–1
New York	2–1	3–0	3–0	0–3	1–2	1–2	2–1	1–2	2–1	4–0	1–2	0–3	0–3	2–1	2–1
Philadelphia	1–2	1–2	3–0	1–2	2–1	2–1	2–1	2–1	1–2	0–3	1–2	1–2	3–0	3–0	3–1
Pittsburgh	2–1	0–3	3–0	1–2	2–2	2–1	1–2	1–2	2–1	2–1	0–3	2–1	1–2	1–2	1–2
San Diego	2–1	2–1	3–0	2–1	2–1	2–1	2–1	0–3	2–1	1–2	3–0	1–3	2–1	2–1	1–2
San Francisco	2–1	1–2	2–1	1–2	2–1	2–1	3–0	1–2	2–1	0–3	2–2	1–2	1–2	2–1	1–2
St. Louis	3–0	2–1	1–2	2–1	1–2	1–2	1–3	2–1	2–1	2–1	2–1	1–2	2–1	2–1	0–3
Washington	2–2	1–2	1–2	1–2	2–1	2–1	0–3	2–1	1–2	2–1	1–2	2–1	1–2	1–2	2–1

Updated with the results of all games through September 30, 2024.

== Game log ==
Legend
Reds Win	Reds Loss	Game postponed	Eliminated from playoff race

2024 Game Log: 77–85 (Home: 39–42; Away: 38–43)
March/April: 16–14 (Home: 9–7; Away: 7–7)

#	Date	Opponent	Score	Win	Loss	Save	Attendance	Record	Streak
1	March 28	Nationals	8–2	Montas (1–0)	Gray (0–1)	—	44,030	1–0	W1
2	March 30	Nationals	6–7	Harvey (1–0)	Díaz (0–1)	Finnegan (1)	39,674	1–1	L1
3	March 31	Nationals	6–5	Sims (1–0)	Finnegan (0–1)	—	13,590	2–1	W1
4	April 1	@ Phillies	6–3 (10)	Díaz (1–1)	Brogdon (0–1)	—	33,754	3–1	W2
5	April 2	@ Phillies	4–9	Turnbull (1–0)	Ashcraft (0–1)	Pinto (1)	28,119	3–2	L1
6	April 3	@ Phillies	4–1	Montas (2–0)	Wheeler (0–1)	Díaz (1)	28,077	4–2	W1
7	April 5	Mets	2–3	Smith (1–0)	Cruz (0–1)	Díaz (1)	16,620	4–3	L1
8	April 6	Mets	9–6	Pagán (1–0)	Ramírez (0–1)	—	28,307	5–3	W1
9	April 7	Mets	1–3	Manaea (1–0)	Abbott (0–1)	Díaz (2)	26,656	5–4	L1
10	April 8	Brewers	10–8	Ashcraft (1–1)	Ashby (0–1)	Díaz (2)	10,382	6–4	W1
11	April 9	Brewers	5–9	Ross (1–0)	Montas (2–1)	—	12,623	6–5	L1
12	April 10	Brewers	2–7	Wilson (1–0)	Greene (0–1)	—	10,388	6–6	L2
—	April 11	Brewers	Postponed (rain); Makeup: August 30						
13	April 12	@ White Sox	11–1	Abbott (1–1)	Flexen (0–3)	—	11,337	7–6	W1
14	April 13	@ White Sox	5–0	Lodolo (1–0)	Crochet (1–2)	—	22,598	8–6	W2
15	April 14	@ White Sox	11–4	Ashcraft (2–1)	Soroka (0–2)	—	17,589	9–6	W3
16	April 15	@ Mariners	3–9	Kirby (2–2)	Montas (2–2)	—	16,008	9–7	L1
17	April 16	@ Mariners	1–3	Gilbert (1–0)	Pagán (1–1)	Saucedo (1)	17,291	9–8	L2
18	April 17	@ Mariners	1–5	Miller (3–1)	Abbott (1–2)	—	17,225	9–9	L3
19	April 19	Angels	7–1	Lodolo (2–0)	Anderson (2–2)	—	22,539	10–9	W1
20	April 20	Angels	7–5	Ashcraft (3–1)	Sandoval (1–3)	Díaz (3)	27,343	11–9	W2
21	April 21	Angels	3–0	Pagán (2–1)	Soriano (0–3)	Díaz (4)	25,935	12–9	W3
22	April 22	Phillies	0–7	Suárez (4–0)	Greene (0–2)	—	11,263	12–10	L1
23	April 23	Phillies	8–1	Cruz (1–1)	Sánchez (1–3)	—	13,653	13–10	W1
24	April 24	Phillies	7–4	Wilson (1–0)	Domínguez (1–1)	Díaz (5)	14,145	14–10	W2
25	April 25	Phillies	0–5	Wheeler (2–3)	Martinez (0–1)	—	17,557	14–11	L1
26	April 26	@ Rangers	1–2	Leclerc (2–2)	Sims (1–1)	Yates (4)	28,396	14–12	L2
27	April 27	@ Rangers	8–4	Greene (1–2)	Lorenzen (2–1)	Díaz (6)	36,553	15–12	W1
28	April 28	@ Rangers	3–4	Dunning (3–2)	Abbott (1–3)	Yates (5)	37,008	15–13	L1
29	April 29	@ Padres	5–2	Lodolo (3–0)	Waldron (1–3)	—	39,158	16–13	W1
30	April 30	@ Padres	4–6	Darvish (1–1)	Martinez (0–2)	Suárez (10)	36,769	16–14	L1

May: 9–18 (Home: 5–10; Away: 4–8)

#	Date	Opponent	Score	Win	Loss	Save	Attendance	Record	Streak
31	May 1	@ Padres	2–6	De Los Santos (1–1)	Cruz (1–2)	—	32,993	16–15	L2
32	May 3	Orioles	0–3	Irvin (3–1)	Pagán (2–2)	Kimbrel (8)	25,861	16–16	L3
33	May 4	Orioles	1–2	Means (1–0)	Abbott (1–4)	Canó (1)	33,202	16–17	L4
34	May 5	Orioles	1–11	Kremer (3–2)	Lodolo (3–1)	—	31,514	16–18	L5
35	May 7	Diamondbacks	2–6	Gallen (4–2)	Montas (2–3)	—	14,485	16–19	L6
36	May 8	Diamondbacks	3–4	Montgomery (2–2)	Ashcraft (3–2)	Mantiply (1)	15,660	16–20	L7
37	May 9	Diamondbacks	4–5	Ginkel (2–0)	Cruz (1–3)	Sewald (1)	18,214	16–21	L8
38	May 10	@ Giants	4–2	Abbott (2–4)	Webb (3–4)	Díaz (7)	32,867	17–21	W1
39	May 11	@ Giants	1–5	Rogers (1–1)	Lodolo (3–2)	—	37,321	17–22	L1
40	May 12	@ Giants	5–6 (10)	Jackson (1–1)	Pagán (2–3)	—	36,210	17–23	L2
41	May 13	@ Diamondbacks	5–6	Martínez (1–0)	Díaz (1–2)	—	18,017	17–24	L3
42	May 14	@ Diamondbacks	6–2	Greene (2–2)	Cecconi (1–3)	—	20,068	18–24	W1
43	May 15	@ Diamondbacks	1–2	Thompson (1–1)	Cruz (1–4)	Sewald (2)	16,826	18–25	L1
44	May 16	@ Dodgers	7–2	Martinez (1–2)	Glasnow (6–2)	—	53,527	19–25	W1
45	May 17	@ Dodgers	3–7	Grove (2–2)	Cruz (1–5)	—	46,832	19–26	L1
46	May 18	@ Dodgers	0–4	Buehler (1–1)	Ashcraft (3–3)	—	49,239	19–27	L2
47	May 19	@ Dodgers	2–3 (10)	Banda (1–0)	Díaz (1–3)	—	52,656	19–28	L3
48	May 21	Padres	2–0	Abbott (3–4)	Musgrove (3–4)	Díaz (8)	18,996	20–28	W1
49	May 22	Padres	3–7	King (4–4)	Martinez (1–3)	—	14,255	20–29	L1
50	May 23	Padres	4–6 (10)	Estrada (1–0)	Moll (0–1)	Suárez (14)	16,479	20–30	L2
51	May 24	Dodgers	9–6	Ashcraft (4–3)	Ramírez (0–2)	—	40,074	21–30	W1
52	May 25	Dodgers	3–1	Greene (3–2)	Buehler (1–2)	Díaz (9)	41,880	22–30	W2
53	May 26	Dodgers	4–1	Martinez (2–3)	Yamamoto (5–2)	Díaz (10)	35,619	23–30	W3
54	May 27	Cardinals	3–1	Lodolo (4–2)	Lynn (2–3)	Sims (1)	24,797	24–30	W4
55	May 28	Cardinals	1–7	Gibson (4–2)	Abbott (3–5)	—	19,471	24–31	L1
56	May 29	Cardinals	3–5	Pallante (1–1)	Montas (2–4)	Helsley (18)	18,713	24–32	L2
57	May 31	@ Cubs	5–4	Cruz (2–5)	Smyly (2–3)	Díaz (11)	36,281	25–32	W1

June: 14–13 (Home: 6–6; Away: 8–7)

#	Date	Opponent	Score	Win	Loss	Save	Attendance	Record	Streak
58	June 1	@ Cubs	5–7	Leiter Jr. (2–3)	Sims (1–2)	Neris (7)	36,430	25–33	L1
59	June 2	@ Cubs	5–2	Lodolo (5–2)	Brown (1–2)	Díaz (12)	38,129	26–33	W1
60	June 3	@ Rockies	13–3	Abbott (4–5)	Feltner (1–5)	—	25,140	27–33	W2
61	June 4	@ Rockies	4–1	Montas (3–4)	Blach (2–3)	—	25,315	28–33	W3
62	June 5	@ Rockies	12–7	Cruz (3–5)	Beeks (2–3)	—	27,022	29–33	W4
63	June 6	Cubs	8–4	Greene (4–2)	Assad (4–2)	—	25,601	30–33	W5
64	June 7	Cubs	3–2	Lodolo (6–2)	Steele (0–3)	Díaz (13)	37,501	31–33	W6
65	June 8	Cubs	4–3	Abbott (5–5)	Brown (1–3)	Wilson (1)	40,274	32–33	W7
66	June 9	Cubs	2–4	Imanaga (6–1)	Montas (3–5)	Neris (9)	32,737	32–34	L1
67	June 11	Guardians	3–5	McKenzie (3–3)	Martinez (2–4)	Clase (20)	34,103	32–35	L2
68	June 12	Guardians	4–2	Lodolo (7–2)	Bibee (4–2)	Díaz (14)	42,427	33–35	W1
69	June 14	@ Brewers	6–5	Greene (5–2)	Peralta (4–4)	Díaz (15)	32,810	34–35	W2
70	June 15	@ Brewers	1–3	Wilson (4–3)	Abbott (5–6)	Megill (12)	38,419	34–36	L1
71	June 16	@ Brewers	4–5	Rea (6–2)	Sims (1–3)	Megill (13)	41,676	34–37	L2
72	June 17	@ Pirates	1–4	Skenes (4–0)	Spiers (0–1)	Bednar (15)	19,951	34–38	L3
73	June 18	@ Pirates	2–1	Lodolo (8–2)	Falter (3–5)	Díaz (16)	16,880	35–38	W1
74	June 19	@ Pirates	0–1	Holderman (3–0)	Martinez (2–5)	Bednar (16)	21,527	35–39	L1
75	June 21	Red Sox	5–2	Abbott (6–6)	Crawford (3–7)	Díaz (17)	37,146	36–39	W1
76	June 22	Red Sox	3–4	Kelly (2–1)	Wilson (1–1)	Jansen (14)	31,803	36–40	L1
77	June 23	Red Sox	4–7	Weissert (3–1)	Lodolo (8–3)	Jansen (15)	29,199	36–41	L2
78	June 24	Pirates	11–5	Spiers (1–1)	Falter (3–6)	—	20,077	37–41	W1
79	June 25	Pirates	5–9	Keller (9–4)	Greene (5–3)	—	25,562	37–42	L1
80	June 26	Pirates	1–6	Ortiz (4–2)	Ashcraft (4–4)	—	22,450	37–43	L2
81	June 27	@ Cardinals	11–4	Abbott (7–6)	Mikolas (6–7)	—	32,787	38–43	W1
82	June 28	@ Cardinals	0–1	Pallante (4–3)	Montas (3–6)	Helsley (29)	40,220	38–44	L1
83	June 29	@ Cardinals	9–4	Spiers (2–1)	Gray (9–5)	—	39,164	39–44	W1
84	June 30	@ Cardinals	0–2	Lynn (4–3)	Greene (5–4)	Helsley (30)	40,951	39–45	L1

July: 13–11 (Home: 7–6; Away: 6–5)

#	Date	Opponent	Score	Win	Loss	Save	Attendance	Record	Streak
85	July 2	@ Yankees	5–4	Ashcraft (5–4)	Gil (9–4)	Díaz (18)	41,219	40–45	W1
86	July 3	@ Yankees	3–2	Abbott (8–6)	Rodón (9–6)	Díaz (19)	47,646	41–45	W2
87	July 4	@ Yankees	8–4	Montas (4–6)	Stroman (7–4)	—	43,154	42–45	W3
88	July 5	Tigers	4–5	Olson (3–8)	Spiers (2–2)	Foley (14)	40,663	42–46	L1
89	July 6	Tigers	3–5	Miller (5–6)	Cruz (3–6)	Chafin (1)	31,464	42–47	L2
90	July 7	Tigers	1–5	Skubal (10–3)	Ashcraft (5–5)	—	25,451	42–48	L3
91	July 8	Rockies	6–0	Abbott (9–6)	Feltner (1–8)	—	15,873	43–48	W1
92	July 9	Rockies	12–6	Martinez (3–5)	Quantrill (6–7)	—	17,542	44–48	W2
93	July 10	Rockies	5–6	Freeland (1–3)	Montas (4–7)	Beeks (9)	16,836	44–49	L1
94	July 11	Rockies	8–1	Greene (6–4)	Gomber (2–6)	—	20,762	45–49	W1
95	July 12	Marlins	7–4	Spiers (3–2)	Chirinos (0–1)	—	31,326	46–49	W2
96	July 13	Marlins	10–6	Moll (1–1)	Cabrera (1–3)	—	26,219	47–49	W3
97	July 14	Marlins	2–3	Puk (3–8)	Cruz (3–7)	Scott (14)	28,514	47–50	L1
ASG	July 16	NL @ AL	3–5	Miller (1–0)	Greene (0–1)	Clase (1)	39,343	—	—
98	July 19	@ Nationals	5–8	Corbin (2–9)	Montas (4–8)	Finnegan (26)	38,402	47–51	L2
99	July 20	@ Nationals	4–5	Law (6–2)	Wilson (1–2)	Finnegan (27)	32,734	47–52	L3
100	July 21	@ Nationals	2–5	Garcia (2–3)	Sims (1–4)	Finnegan (28)	23,967	47–53	L4
101	July 22	@ Braves	4–1	Greene (7–4)	López (7–4)	—	38,779	48–53	W1
—	July 23	@ Braves	Postponed (rain); Makeup: July 24						
102	July 24 (1)	@ Braves	9–4	Moll (2–1)	Winans (0–2)	—	34,407	49–53	W2
—	July 24 (2)	@ Braves	Postponed (rain); Makeup: September 9						
103	July 26	@ Rays	3–2 (10)	Martinez (4–5)	Rodríguez (1–2)	Díaz (20)	20,441	50–53	W3
104	July 27	@ Rays	0–4	Littell (4–7)	Abbott (9–7)	—	23,464	50–54	L1
105	July 28	@ Rays	1–2	Cleavinger (7–2)	Cruz (3–8)	Fairbanks (20)	19,873	50–55	L2
106	July 29	Cubs	7–1	Spiers (4–2)	Taillon (7–6)	—	21,837	51–55	W1
107	July 30	Cubs	6–3	Martinez (5–5)	Steele (2–5)	Díaz (21)	25,678	52–55	W2
108	July 31	Cubs	4–13	Hendricks (3–9)	Lodolo (8–4)	—	20,733	52–56	L1

August: 12–17 (Home: 5–10; Away: 7–7)

#	Date	Opponent	Score	Win	Loss	Save	Attendance	Record	Streak
109	August 2	Giants	0–3	Snell (1–3)	Abbott (9–8)	—	28,075	52–57	L2
110	August 3	Giants	6–4	Greene (8–4)	Harrison (6–5)	Díaz (22)	32,602	53–57	W1
111	August 4	Giants	2–8	Ray (2–1)	Spiers (4–3)	—	27,692	53–58	L1
112	August 5	@ Marlins	10–3	Martinez (6–5)	Muñoz (2–6)	—	9,460	54–58	W1
113	August 6	@ Marlins	8–2	Lodolo (9–4)	Meyer (2–2)	—	7,948	55–58	W2
114	August 7	@ Marlins	4–6	Bellozo (1–1)	Abbott (9–9)	Faucher (2)	8,657	55–59	L1
115	August 8	@ Marlins	10–4 (10)	Farmer (1–0)	Ramírez (0–1)	—	8,728	56–59	W1
116	August 9	@ Brewers	3–8	Civale (3–8)	Spiers (4–4)	—	37,742	56–60	L1
117	August 10	@ Brewers	0–1	Payamps (2–5)	Santillan (0–1)	Williams (1)	38,639	56–61	L2
118	August 11	@ Brewers	4–3	Farmer (2–0)	Ross (2–6)	Díaz (23)	40,049	57–61	W1
119	August 12	Cardinals	6–1	Abbott (10–9)	Gray (11–7)	—	21,682	58–61	W2
120	August 13	Cardinals	4–1	Greene (9–4)	Fedde (8–6)	Díaz (24)	19,107	59–61	W3
121	August 14	Cardinals	9–2	Moll (3–1)	Gibson (7–5)	—	15,967	60–61	W4
122	August 16	Royals	1–7	Lorenzen (6–6)	Martinez (6–6)	—	32,500	60–62	L1
123	August 17	Royals	1–13	Wacha (10–6)	Lodolo (9–5)	—	35,430	60–63	L2
124	August 18	Royals	1–8	Singer (9–8)	Abbott (10–10)	—	30,388	60–64	L3
125	August 19	@ Blue Jays	6–3	Santillan (1–1)	Gausman (11–9)	—	25,603	61–64	W1
126	August 20	@ Blue Jays	3–10	Berríos (12–9)	Spiers (4–5)	—	34,662	61–65	L1
127	August 21	@ Blue Jays	11–7	Pagán (3–3)	Little (1–2)	—	27,057	62–65	W1
128	August 22	@ Pirates	0–7	Skenes (8–2)	Lodolo (9–6)	—	16,635	62–66	L1
129	August 23	@ Pirates	5–6	Santana (3–1)	Wilson (1–3)	Bednar (23)	19,941	62–67	L2
130	August 24	@ Pirates	10–2	Aguiar (1–0)	Woodford (0–6)	Kelly (1)	38,137	63–67	W1
131	August 25	@ Pirates	3–4	Chapman (5–4)	Díaz (1–4)	—	18,653	63–68	L1
132	August 27	Athletics	4–5	Otañez (1–0)	Santillan (1–2)	Miller (22)	15,786	63–69	L2
133	August 28	Athletics	6–9	Ferguson (2–1)	Pagán (3–4)	Miller (23)	12,065	63–70	L3
134	August 29	Athletics	10–9	Pagán (4–4)	Holman (0–1)	—	36,098	64–70	W1
135	August 30 (1)	Brewers	4–5 (10)	Megill (1–3)	Díaz (1–5)	Williams (7)	14,436	64–71	L1
136	August 30 (1)	Brewers	0–14	Hall (1–1)	Lowder (0–1)	—	22,488	64–72	L2
137	August 31	Brewers	4–5	Ashby (1–2)	Wilson (1–4)	Williams (8)	27,881	64–73	L3

September: 13–12 (Home: 7–3; Away: 6–9)

#	Date	Opponent	Score	Win	Loss	Save	Attendance	Record	Streak
138	September 1	Brewers	4–3 (11)	Díaz (2–5)	Wilson (5–4)	—	26,457	65–73	W1
139	September 2	Astros	5–3	Spiers (5–5)	Verlander (3–5)	Wilson (2)	24,606	66–73	W2
140	September 4	Astros	12–5	Martinez (7–6)	Arrighetti (7–12)	Suter (1)	17,865	67–73	W3
141	September 5	Astros	1–0	Santillan (2–2)	Abreu (2–3)	Díaz (25)	16,126	68–73	W4
142	September 6	@ Mets	4–6 (10)	Buttó (7–3)	Wilson (1–5)	—	25,335	68–74	L1
143	September 7	@ Mets	0–4	Quintana (8–9)	Moll (3–2)	—	34,048	68–75	L2
144	September 8	@ Mets	3–1	Farmer (3–0)	Maton (2–3)	Díaz (26)	28,142	69–75	W1
145	September 9	@ Braves	1–0	Martinez (8–6)	Morton (8–8)	Díaz (27)	34,883	70–75	W2
146	September 10	@ Cardinals	3–0	Lowder (1–1)	Pallante (6–8)	Pagán (1)	30,350	71–75	W3
147	September 11	@ Cardinals	1–2	Romero (7–2)	Farmer (3–1)	Helsley (44)	30,179	71–76	L1
148	September 12	@ Cardinals	1–6	Gray (13–9)	Spiers (5–6)	Romero (1)	32,528	71–77	L2
149	September 13	@ Twins	8–4	Aguiar (2–0)	Ober (12–7)	—	27,170	72–77	W1
150	September 14	@ Twins	11–1	Martinez (9–6)	Woods Richardson (5–5)	Suter (2)	28,881	73–77	W2
151	September 15	@ Twins	2–9	Sands (8–1)	Lowder (1–2)	—	22,545	73–78	L1
152	September 17	Braves	6–5	Suter (1–0)	Johnson (5–5)	Díaz (28)	20,955	74–78	W1
153	September 18	Braves	1–7	Schwellenbach (7–7)	Santillan (2–3)	—	18,959	74–79	L1
154	September 19	Braves	3–15	Sale (18–3)	Aguiar (2–1)	—	20,071	74–80	L2
155	September 20	Pirates	8–3	Martinez (10–6)	Keller (11–11)	—	40,541	75–80	W1
156	September 21	Pirates	7–1	Lowder (2–2)	Jones (6–8)	—	25,574	76–80	W2
157	September 22	Pirates	0–2	Skenes (11–3)	Greene (9–5)	Chapman (11)	34,750	76–81	L1
158	September 24	@ Guardians	1–6	Bibee (12–8)	Spiers (5–7)	—	19,752	76–82	L2
159	September 25	@ Guardians	2–5	Gaddis (6–3)	Pagán (4–5)	Clase (47)	25,860	76–83	L3
160	September 27	@ Cubs	0–1	Taillon (12–8)	Martinez (10–7)	Hodge (8)	32,083	76–84	L4
161	September 28	@ Cubs	0–3	Miller (5–1)	Farmer (3–2)	Hodge (9)	38,180	76–85	L5
162	September 29	@ Cubs	3–0 (10)	Santillan (3–3)	Roberts (1–1)	Farmer (1)	33,792	77–85	W1

== Season summary ==
=== Opening Day starters ===
Thursday, March 28, 2024 vs. Washington Nationals at Great American Ball Park.

Name	Pos.
Jonathan India	2B
Will Benson	CF
Christian Encarnacion-Strand	1B
Jeimer Candelario	3B
Jake Fraley	RF
Elly De La Cruz	SS
Spencer Steer	LF
Nick Martini	DH
Tyler Stephenson	C
Frankie Montas	P

=== March/April ===
- March 10 - The Reds named Frankie Montas as the Opening Day starting pitcher.
- March 28 – In the first game of the season, the Reds faced the Washington Nationals at Great American Ball Park to kick off a three-game season opening series. Nick Martini hit two home runs and drove home five runners and Spencer Steer had two hits, drove home two runs and scored twice, as the Reds defeated the Nationals 8-2 in front of a sold out crowd of 44,030 fans. Frankie Montas earned his first win as a Red, pitching six scoreless innings and struck out four batters.
- March 30 - After a scheduled off day, the Reds and Nationals resumed their season opening series. Jeimer Candelario hit his first home run as a Red, while Luke Maile also homered, however, the Nationals scored three runs in the ninth inning, sending Cincinnati to their first loss of the season by a 7-6 score.
- March 31 - With the Reds down 5-3 in the bottom of the ninth inning, Will Benson hit a two-run home run, tying the game, then Christian Encarnacion-Strand hit the game-winning home run, as Cincinnati rallied back to defeat the Nationals 6-5.
- April 1 - Cincinnati travelled to Citizens Bank Park in Philadelphia, Pennsylvania to open a three-game series against the Philadelphia Phillies. Spencer Steer hit a grand slam in the tenth inning, as the Reds defeated the Phillies 6-3.
- April 2 - Spencer Steer had three hits, improving his season batting average to .474, and drove home a runner for the Reds in a 9-4 loss to Philadelphia.
- April 3 - Frankie Montas pitched 5.2 innings, allowing only one run, to win his second game of the season, as the Reds defeated the Phillies 4-1. Christian Encarnacion-Strand drove home two runners with a third inning double.
- April 5 - After an off-day, Cincinnati returned home for a three-game series against the New York Mets. Spencer Steer hit a solo home run in the first inning and starting pitcher Hunter Greene pitched six innings, allowing only one run and struck out six batters, however, the Reds lost the series opener by a 3-2 score to the Mets.
- April 6 - Spencer Steer hit a three-run home run, helping the Reds rally with a five run eighth inning and defeat the Mets 9-6. Elly De La Cruz scored three runs and drove home two runners.
- April 7 - The Reds were held to only three hits, as they dropped the final game of the series, losing 3-1 to the Mets. Andrew Abbott allowed two runs in five innings to take the loss.
- April 8 - The Reds concluded their seven-game homestand with a four-game series against their divisional rivals, the Milwaukee Brewers. Elly De La Cruz hit his first two home runs of the season, including a 450 foot solo home run and an inside-the-park-home run, leading the Reds to a 10-8 win over the Brewers. De La Cruz had four hits in the game, scored four runs and stole a base in the win. Will Benson had two hits, including a solo home run.
- April 9 - Christian Encarnacion-Strand broke out of his early season slump, getting two hits and scoring two runs, as the Reds lost to the Brewers 9-5.
- April 10 - The start time of the game was delayed by nearly two hours due to heavy rain. Elly De La Cruz hit a solo home run in the sixth inning for his third home run in three games, however, the Reds lost their second game in a row, dropping a 7-2 decision to Milwaukee.
- April 11 - The final game of the Reds-Brewers series was postponed due to rain. The game will be made up as the first game of a split doubleheader on August 30.
- April 12 - The Reds began a six-game road trip with a three-game interleague series against the Chicago White Sox at Guaranteed Rate Field in Chicago, Illinois. In the first game, Elly De La Cruz hit a home run and drove home three runners, leading Cincinnati to an 11-1 victory. Tyler Stephenson also hit a home run and Christian Encarnacion-Strand had two hits, driving home three runners. Andrew Abbott pitched seven innings, allowing only one run, to earn his first victory of the season.
- April 13 - Nick Lodolo pitched 5.2 shutout innings, striking out 10 batters and allowing only one hit, as the Reds shutout the White Sox 5-0. Spencer Steer drove home three runners, bringing his total to an MLB-leading 18 RBI. Luke Maile also drove home two runners in the win.
- April 14 - Cincinnati completed the three-game sweep, defeating the White Sox 11-4. Christian Encarnacion-Strand hit a two-run home run and drove home four runners while Nick Martini also hit a two-run homer. Jake Fraley scored three runs in the win. Graham Ashcraft pitched 5.2 innings, allowing only one earned run and struck out eight to earn the victory.
- April 15 - The Reds concluded their six-game road trip with a three-game interleague series against the Seattle Mariners at T-Mobile Park in Seattle, Washington. In the first game, Jake Fraley and Jeimer Candelario each hit home runs, however, the Reds three-game winning streak was snapped, as the Mariners won the game 9-3.
- April 16 - The Reds offense was limited to only four hits, as Seattle defeated Cincinnati 3-1. Hunter Greene struck out eight batters in four innings.
- April 17 - Elly De La Cruz had the only Reds hit, a solo home run, as the Reds were swept in their three-game series by the Mariners, losing the final game 5-1.
- April 19 - Following a day off, the Reds return home for a three-game interleague series against the Los Angeles Angels. Elly De La Cruz hit a three-run home run, and stole three bases to bring his season total to 10, as the Reds defeated the Angels 7-1. Nick Lodolo earned the win, as he pitched 6.1 innings, allowing one run and striking out six. The victory snapped the Reds three-game losing streak.
- April 20 - Tyler Stephenson hit his first career grand slam, helping Cincinnati to a 7-5 victory over the Angels. Spencer Steer had three hits, two runs and stole a base, while Elly De La Cruz earned four walks.
- April 21 - Christian Encarnacion-Strand hit a two-run double, breaking a scoreless tie in the sixth inning, as the Reds completed the three-game sweep with a 3-0 win over the Angels. Frankie Montas left the game in the first inning after taking a line drive off of his right forearm.
- April 22 - The Reds hosted the Philadelphia Phillies for a four-game home series. In the series opener, the Reds were limited to two hits, as the Phillies shutout Cincinnati 7-0. Elly De La Cruz stole his 11th base of the season in the loss.
- April 23 - Christian Encarnacion-Strand had three hits with two RBI and Elly De La Cruz hit a two-run home run, leading the Reds to an 8-1 victory over the Phillies. Santiago Espinal had three hits and hit his first home run with the Reds.
- April 24 - Santiago Espinal had two hits, driving home three runners, helping the Reds defeat Philadelphia by a score of 7-4. Elly De La Cruz had three hits, and stole three bases, bringing his season total to 15, which is the highest in MLB. Will Benson had two hits, including a home run.
- April 25 - The Reds were held to three singles in the game, as Philadelphia won the final game of the four-game series by a 5-0 score.
- April 26 - Cincinnati began a six-game road trip with a three-game series against the defending World Series champions, the Texas Rangers at Globe Life Field in Arlington, Texas. Graham Ashcraft had a solid start, allowing only one run in 6.1 innings, however, the Reds lost to the Rangers 2-1. Elly De La Cruz stole two bases, including home, to bring his season total to a league high 17.
- April 27 - Jonathan India had four hits, including his first home run of the season, and drove home four runners, as the Reds defeated the Rangers 8-4. Hunter Greene pitched seven innings, allowing only one hit, to earn his first victory of the season.
- April 28 - In the series finale, Jonathan India had two hits and Elly De La Cruz swiped his 18th base of the season, however, the Reds lost a close game to Texas by a score of 4-3.
- April 29 - Cincinnati concluded their six-game road trip with a three-game series at Petco Park in San Diego, California against the San Diego Padres. Nick Lodolo pitched seven innings, allowing only one hit and run and struck out 11 batters, earning his third win of the season as the Reds defeated San Diego 5-2. Elly De La Cruz hit a 443 foot home run, his eighth of the season, to lead the Reds offense.
- April 30 - Jeimer Candelario had two hits, including a home run, while Stuart Fairchild also hit a home run, as the Reds lost to the Padres 6-4.

=== May ===
- May 1 - Spencer Steer hit a home run and stole a base in the Reds 6-2 loss to the Padres. Graham Ashcraft earned a no-decision, as he allowed two unearned runs in six innings pitched.
- May 3 - After an off-day, the Reds returned home for a three-game interleague series against the top ranked team in the American League, the Baltimore Orioles. After the start of the game was delayed by almost three hours due to rain, Elly De La Cruz recorded the only two hits the Reds were to get, as Baltimore shutout Cincinnati 3-0. Hunter Greene allowed no runs in 5.2 innings pitched in his start.
- May 4 - The Reds lost their fourth game in a row, as the club lost to the Orioles 2-1. Spencer Steer drove home the lone run for Cincinnati with a ninth inning single, scoring Jake Fraley. Andrew Abbott struck out eight batters in five innings, but took the loss.
- May 5 - Baltimore completed the three-game series sweep, defeating Cincinnati 11-1, extending the Reds losing streak to five games. Jake Fraley broke the shutout bid with an RBI single in the bottom of the ninth inning.
- May 7 - Following an off-day, the Reds will host the Arizona Diamondbacks for a three-game series. Cincinnati's offensive struggles continued, as they were held to only three hits, in a 6-2 loss to the Diamondbacks. Jonathan India and Tyler Stephenson each hit solo home runs. Frankie Montas had a strong start, allowing only one run and striking out seven in six innings.
- May 8 - Jeimer Candelario had three hits and drove home a runner, while Elly De La Cruz stole two bases, bringing his league-high total to 21, however, the Reds lost their seventh game in a row, losing to the Diamondbacks 4-3.
- May 9 - Jeimer Candelario had two hits, scored two runs and hit a solo home run and Elly De La Cruz had two hits and stole two bases, as the Reds lost their eighth game in a row, losing 5-4.
- May 10 - Cincinnati began a ten-game Western road trip with a three-game series against the San Francisco Giants at Oracle Park in San Francisco, California. Stuart Fairchild hit an inside-the-park home run, helping the Reds snap their eight game losing streak, in a 4-2 victory over the Giants. Elly De La Cruz had two hits, two runs and stole two bases, bringing his total to a league high 25 on the season.
- May 11 - Elly De La Cruz hit a solo home run, as the Reds lost to the Giants 5-1.
- May 12 - Jeimer Candelario hit a three-run double in the first inning, however, the Reds lost the final game of the series against the Giants by a score of 6-5 in ten innings. With the loss, Cincinnati has lost ten of their last eleven games.
- May 13 - The Reds road trip continued with a three-game series against the Arizona Diamondbacks at Chase Field in Phoenix, Arizona. Mike Ford hit a triple in the eighth inning, giving the Reds a 5-4 lead, however, Arizona rallied in the ninth to defeat Cincinnati 6-5, handing the Reds their eleventh loss in their past twelve games.
- May 14 - Will Benson hit a two-run home run, while Tyler Stephenson had three hits and scored twice, as the Reds broke out of their slump and defeated the Diamondbacks 6-2. Hunter Greene pitched seven innings, allowing only two runs and striking out five, to earn the win.
- May 15 - Andrew Abbott pitched seven innings in his start, allowing only four hits and one run, however, the Reds offense was limited to only three hits, which included a home run by Santiago Espinal, in a 2-1 loss to Arizona.
- May 16 - The Reds ten-game road trip concluded with a four-game series against the Los Angeles Dodgers at Dodger Stadium in Los Angeles, California. Elly De La Cruz had four hits, stole a career-high four bases to bring his MLB-leading total to 30, and scored three runs, leading the Reds to a 7-2 win over the Dodgers. Nick Martinez pitched five shutout innings out of the bullpen to record his first win with the club.
- May 17 - Stuart Fairchild and Tyler Stephenson each hit solo home runs, however, the Reds lost to the Dodgers 7-3. With the loss, Cincinnati falls into last place in the division.
- May 18 - Cincinnati was held to only three hits, as the Reds lost to the Dodgers by a score of 3-0. The loss drops the Reds record to 3-14 in their past 17 games.
- May 19 - Hunter Greene had a very strong start, pitching 6.1 innings and allowing only four hits and two runs, while striking out eight batters. Stuart Fairchild had two hits and scored a run, however, the Reds lost the game, 3-2 in ten innings. The Reds concluded their ten-game road trip with a 3-7 record.
- May 21 - After an off-day, the Reds hosted the San Diego Padres for a three-game series. In the series opener, Andrew Abbott pitched seven scoreless innings, leading Cincinnati to a 2-0 victory over San Diego.
- May 22 - Jeimer Candelario had two hits, including a home run, and scored twice and Tyler Stephenson drove home two runners, as the Reds lost to the Padres 7-3. As a team, Cincinnati hit into four double plays.
- May 23 - Nick Martini had two hits, scored two runs and hit a two-run home run, however, the Reds lost to the Padres 6-4 in ten innings. With the loss, Cincinnati falls to 4-17 in their past 21 games.
- May 24 - The Reds hosted the Los Angeles Dodgers for a three-game weekend series. Jonathan India hit a grand slam and Spencer Steer hit a three-run home run, powering the Reds to a 9-6 victory over the Dodgers.
- May 25 - Hunter Greene pitched six innings, allowing only one run and struck out five, as the Reds defeated the Dodgers 3-1. Spencer Steer and Will Benson each hit solo home runs in the victory.
- May 26 - Nick Martini had two hits and drove home two runners and Jonathan India scored a run and drove home two runs, as the Reds completed the series, defeating the Dodgers 4-1. Nick Martinez pitched 4.1 innings, allowing no runs and only one hit, to earn the victory.
- May 27 - The Reds wrapped up their six-game homestand with a three-game series against their divisional rivals, the St. Louis Cardinals. On Memorial Day, Jeimer Candelario hit a first inning home run, and Nick Lodolo pitched 5.1 innings, allowing only one run, as the Reds won their fourth game in a row, defeating the Cardinals 3-1.
- May 28 - Will Benson hit a solo home run, as the Reds were limited to four hits in a 7-1 loss to the Cardinals. The win snapped the Reds winning streak at four games.
- May 29 - The Reds concluded their nine-game homestand with a 5-3 loss to the Cardinals. Nick Martini had two hits and scored twice, while Elly De La Cruz also had two hits and scored a run.
- May 31 - After a day off, the Reds are on the road for a three game divisional series against the Chicago Cubs at Wrigley Field in Chicago, Illinois. Santiago Espinal hit a pinch hit two-run home run in the seventh inning, helping Cincinnati defeat the Cubs 5-4.

=== June ===
- June 1 - The start of the game was delayed by nearly three-and-a half-hours due to rain, as the first pitch was rescheduled for 9:35 pm local time. Jonathan India had two hits and scored a run, however, the Cubs defeated the Reds 7-5.
- June 2 - TJ Friedl hit a three-run home run in the second inning, helping the Reds defeat the Cubs by a score of 5-2. Nick Lodolo pitched six innings, allowing two runs and struck out three to earn his fifth win of the season.
- June 3 - The Reds wrapped up their six-game road trip with a three game series at Coors Field in Denver, Colorado against the Colorado Rockies. Jeimer Candelario and Tyler Stephenson each hit two-run home runs and Will Benson drove home three runs, as the Reds crushed the Rockies 13-3.
- June 4 - Frankie Montas pitched seven shutout innings, allowing only one hit and struck out nine, as the Reds won their third game in a row, defeating the Rockies 4-1. Elly De La Cruz hit his tenth home run of the season in the win.
- June 5 - Jonathan India hit a grand slam in the ninth inning, capping off a six-run inning, as the Reds came back and defeated the Rockies 12-7 to sweep the three-game series. TJ Friedl, Jeimer Candelario and Spencer Steer also homered in the win. With the victory, the Reds improve to 9-3 in their past 12 games.
- June 6 - The Reds returned home for a four-game series against their divisional rivals, the Chicago Cubs. Elly De La Cruz hit a three-run home run and Tyler Stephenson had two hits and scored two runs, as the Reds won their fifth in a row, defeating Chicago by a score of 8-4.
- June 7 - Cincinnati won their sixth consecutive game, defeating the Cubs 3-2. Nick Lodolo improved to 6-2 on the season with a 2.92 ERA after pitching six innings, allowing a run and struck out seven. Tyler Stephenson drove home two runs with a double in the fourth inning.
- June 8 - The Reds stayed hot, as TJ Friedl hit a three-run home run and Jeimer Candelario hit a solo homer, as the Reds defeated the Cubs 4-3 to win their seventh game in a row.
- June 9 - Santiago Espinal had two hits and Luke Maile hit a solo home run, however, the Cubs ended the Reds winning streak, as Chicago won the game 4-2.
- June 11 - After an off-day, the Reds hosted the Cleveland Guardians for the first two games of the Ohio Cup. In the series opener, Jeimer Candelario hit an RBI double in the first inning, giving the Reds an early lead, however, the Guardians came back and won the game 5-3. Spencer Steer and Jonathan India also drove home a run in the loss.
- June 12 - Jeimer Candelario hit two home runs and drove home four runs, leading the Reds to a 4-2 victory over the Guardians to split the two-game series. Nick Lodolo improved his record to 7-2 as he pitched six innings, allowing two runs and struck out six. The teams will conclude their Ohio Cup series in late-September when Cincinnati visits Cleveland for two games.
- June 14 - After a day off, the Reds headed to American Family Field in Milwaukee, Wisconsin for a three-game weekend series against the division leading Milwaukee Brewers. TJ Friedl had three hits, including a home run, and scored twice, while Jeimer Candelario had two hits, including a two-run home run, leading the Reds to a 6-5 victory. The Reds defense had a tough game, as the club committed five errors.
- June 15 - Jeimer Candelario had two hits and drove home the lone Reds run, as Cincinnati lost to the Brewers 3-1.
- June 16 - Elly De La Cruz had two hits, including a solo home run, and scored three runs, however, the Reds dropped the final game of the series, losing 5-4 to the Brewers.
- June 17 - The Reds six-game road trip ended with a three-game series against their divisional rivals, the Pittsburgh Pirates at PNC Park in Pittsburgh, Pennsylvania. Elly De La Cruz had three hits and stole his league-leading 37th base of the season and Spencer Steer hit an RBI-double, as the Reds lost their third game in a row, losing 4-1 to the Pirates.
- June 18 - Nick Lodolo pitched seven innings, allowing just four hits and one run, and struck out eight batters, as he improved his win-loss record to 8-2 on the season in the Reds 2-1 win over the Pirates. Santiago Espinal led the Reds offense with a two-run home run.
- June 19 - Hunter Greene pitched 6.1 shutout innings, allowing two hits and striking out nine batters, however, the Reds offense was held to only two hits in a 1-0 loss to the Pirates.
- June 21 - Following an off day, the Reds hosted the Boston Red Sox in a three-game interleague series. Jeimer Candelario hit two home runs and Andrew Abbott struck out 10 batters, as the Reds defeated the Red Sox 5-2.
- June 22 - Elly De La Cruz had three hits, including a solo home run and Spencer Steer hit a two-run home run in the Reds 4-3 loss to Boston.
- June 23 - Jonathan India, Elly De La Cruz and Stuart Fairchild each had two hits, however, the Reds lost the final game of the series, losing 7-4 to the Red Sox. With the loss, Cincinnati has lost six of their past eight games.
- June 24 - The Reds welcomed their division rivals, the Pittsburgh Pirates, for a three-game home series. Elly De La Cruz had three hits, including a home run, scored three runs and drove home three runners. Spencer Steer had two hit and drove home three runs, as the Reds defeated the Pirates 11-5.
- June 25 - Jonathan India had two hits, earned two walks and scored three runs, however, the Reds lost to Pittsburgh by a score of 9-5.
- June 26 - Jonathan India had two hits and drove home the lone Reds run, as Cincinnati lost the series finale by a 6-1 score to the Pirates.
- June 27 - The Reds began a seven-game road trip with a four-game series at Busch Stadium in St. Louis, Missouri against their divisional rivals, the St. Louis Cardinals. Spencer Steer hit a two-run home run, while Elly De La Cruz and Noelvi Marte each had three hits, as the Reds crushed the Cardinals 11-4.
- June 28 - Jonathan India had two of the Reds three hits, as Cincinnati was shutout by the Cardinals, losing 1-0.
- June 29 - Austin Wynns had three hits and scored two runs, while Jonathan India and Stuart Fairchild each had two hits and drove home two runs, as the Reds defeated the Cardinals 9-4. Elly De La Cruz stole his MLB leading 40th stolen base in the victory.
- June 30 - The Reds were limited to only two hits, as the Cardinals shutout the Reds for the second time in the series, as Cincinnati lost 2-0.

=== July ===
- July 2 - After an off-day, the Reds wrapped up their seven-game road trip with a three-game interleague series against the New York Yankees at Yankee Stadium in The Bronx, New York. Elly De La Cruz hit a triple and a two-run home run, while Will Benson also connected for a two-run home run, as the Reds defeated the Yankees 5-4.
- July 3 - Noelvi Marte hit a two-run home run and Stuart Fairchild hit a solo home run, leading the Reds to a 3-2 victory over the Yankees. Andrew Abbott improved to 8-6 on the season, pitching 6.1 innings and only allowing three hits and one run. His season ERA dropped to 3.28.
- July 4 - Spencer Steer hit a three-run home run, while Nick Martini and Jonathan India hit solo home runs, leading the Reds to a series sweep, defeating the Yankees 8-4 on Independence Day. Jake Fraley drove home three runners with a bases loaded triple.
- July 5 - Cincinnati returned home for the three-game interleague series against the Detroit Tigers. Spencer Steer had two hits, including a solo home run, and drove home two runners, as the Tigers defeated Cincinnati 5-4.
- July 6 - Spencer Steer homered for the third consecutive game and Tyler Stephenson hit a two-run double, however, the Tigers defeated the Reds 5-3. Hunter Greene had an excellent start, pitching seven shutout innings, allowing only three hits.
- July 7 - The Reds were limited to only four hits, as the Tigers completed the three-game series sweep, defeating Cincinnati 5-1.
- July 8 - The Reds homestand continued with a four-game series against the Colorado Rockies. Andrew Abbott pitched seven shutout innings, allowing three hits and striking out eight, leading the Reds to a 6-0 win over the Rockies. Elly De La Cruz stole two bases, bringing his MLB-leading total to 45 on the season, and set the Reds record for most stolen bases before the All-Star break. Rece Hinds hit a home run in his major league debut.
- July 9 - Rece Hinds hit a 458-foot home run, and became the first player in Major League Baseball history to have five extra base hits in his first two career games, as Cincinnati defeated the Rockies 12-6. Spencer Steer, Will Benson and Tyler Stephenson also homered for the Reds.
- July 10 - Jonathan India and Tyler Stephenson each hit home runs and Noelvi Marte had three hits, scoring twice, as the Reds lost to Colorado 6-5.
- July 11 - Tyler Stephenson homered twice and drove home five runners and Hunter Greene pitched six innings, allowing one run and striking out ten batters, as the Reds crushed the Rockies 8-1 to win three of the four games against them in the series.
- July 12 - The Reds wrapped up the first half of the season and their ten-game homestand with a three game series against the Miami Marlins. Rece Hinds hit his first career grand slam, while Jonathan India and Jeimer Candelario had first inning solo home runs, as the Reds defeated the Marlins 7-4.
- July 13 - The Reds hit six home runs in the game, led by Rece Hinds who hit two, as Cincinnati defeated the Marlins 10-6. Jeimer Candelario, Santiago Espinal, Spencer Steer and Elly De La Cruz also hit home runs for the Reds.
- July 14 - Elly De La Cruz hit a two-run home run, however, the Reds lost their final game before the All-Star break, as the Marlins defeated the Reds 3-2.
- July 16 - The 2024 Major League Baseball All-Star Game was held at Globe Life Field in Arlington, Texas. Elly De La Cruz had a single in two at-bats, and Hunter Greene pitched an inning, allowing two runs, taking the loss, as the American League defeated the National League 5-3.
- July 19 - Following the All-Star break, the Reds headed to Nationals Park in Washington, District of Columbia for a three game series against the Washington Nationals. Austin Slater drove home two runners, and Elly De La Cruz picked up his MLB-high 47th stolen base, as Cincinnati lost to Washington 8-5.
- July 20 - Tyler Stephenson hit a solo home run and walked twice, as the Reds lost their third game in a row, dropping a 5-4 decision against the Nationals.
- July 21 - Noelvi Marte and Stuart Fairchild each hit solo home runs, and Andrew Abbott had a strong start, pitching 6.1 innings and allowing no earned runs, however, the Reds losing streak was extended to four games, as the Nationals defeated Cincinnati 5-2 to sweep the three-game series.
- July 22 - The Reds road trip continued with a three-game series against the Atlanta Braves at Truist Park in Atlanta, Georgia. Elly De La Cruz had two hits and scored twice, and Will Benson had two hits, including a solo home run, as the Reds defeated the Braves 4-1 to snap their four-game losing skid.
- July 23 - The middle game of the Reds-Braves series was postponed due to rain. The game will be made up with as a split doubleheader on July 24.
- July 24 - Game 1 - Elly De La Cruz had three hits, including a home run, and stole two bases, bringing his total to a MLB-high 51 on the season, as the Reds routed the Braves 9-4. Spencer Steer had three hits and drove home three runs, while Jake Fraley also had three hits, including a two-run home run in the win.
- July 24 - Game 2 - The second game of the doubleheader in the Reds-Braves series was postponed due to inclement weather. The game will be made up on September 9.
- July 26 - Following an off-day, the Reds wrapped up their road trip with a three-game interleague series against the Tampa Bay Rays at Tropicana Field in St. Petersburg, Florida. Stuart Fairchild hit an RBI double in the top of the tenth inning, leading the Reds to a 3-2 win over the Rays, extending Cincinnati's winning streak to three games.
- July 27 - The Reds were limited to only four hits, as the Rays shutout Cincinnati 4-0.
- July 28 - Elly De La Cruz had three hits and stole four bases, bringing his league high total to 55, however, the Reds offense struggled in a 2-1 loss to the Rays.
- July 29 - The Reds returned home for a three-game series against their divisional rivals, the Chicago Cubs. TJ Friedl hit a three-run home run and Jeimer Candelario hit a solo homer, leading the Reds to a 7-1 win over the Cubs. Carson Spiers earned the win, allowing only one hit over five innings pitched.
- July 30 - Santiago Espinal had four hits, including a two-run home run, while Tyler Stephenson had three hits and scored a run and TJ Friedl had two hits and drove two runners, as Cincinnati defeated the Cubs 6-3.
- July 31 - Jake Fraley hit a three-run home run, however, the Cubs won the final game of the series, defeating the Reds 13-4.

=== August ===
- August 2 - The Reds welcomed the San Francisco Giants for a three-game home series. Blake Snell of the Giants threw a no-hitter against the Reds, as San Francisco won the game 3-0.
- August 3 - Tyler Stephenson hit two home runs and Hunter Greene pitched six shutout innings, allowing only one hit and struck out 11 batters, as the Reds defeated San Francisco 6-4.
- August 4 - Jeimer Candelario and Santiago Espinal each hit solo home runs, however, the Giants defeated the Reds 8-2 in the last game of the series.
- August 5 - The Reds began a seven-game road trip with a four-game series against the Miami Marlins at LoanDepot Park in Miami, Florida. Elly De La Cruz hit two home runs and two doubles, driving home three runners and scoring three runs, leading the Reds to a 10-3 win over the Marlins.
- August 6 - Elly De La Cruz had another four hit game, including two doubles, while scoring twice and drive home two runners, as Cincinnati defeated the Marlins 8-2. Tyler Stephenson and Ty France each homered for the Reds. Nick Lodolo pitched six innings, allowing two runs and struck out seven batters, improving his record to 9-4 on the season.
- August 7 - TJ Friedl hit his first career grand slam in the seventh inning, however, the Reds comeback attempt fell short, as Cincinnati lost to the Marlins 6-4.
- August 8 - TJ Friedl hit a home run and drove home three runners, while Elly De La Cruz had three hits, stole his 59th base of the season and scored twice, as the Reds defeated the Marlins 10-4 in ten innings.
- August 9 - The Reds finished up their road trip with a three-game series against their divisional rival and leader of the NL Central, the Milwaukee Brewers at American Family Field in Milwaukee, Wisconsin. Spencer Steer and Stuart Fairchild each homered, however, the Reds dropped the opening game by a score of 8-3.
- August 10 - The Reds offense was held to only three hits, as the Brewers shutout Cincinnati 1-0. Nick Martinez had a no-decision in his start, as he allowed one hit and struck out seven batters in seven innings pitched.
- August 11 - Tyler Stephenson had two hits, including a home run and Santiago Espinal also had two hits, driving home two runners, as the Reds defeated the Brewers 4-3.
- August 12 - Cincinnati returned home for a three-game series against their divisional rivals, St. Louis Cardinals. Spencer Steer hit two home runs and drove home five runners and Andrew Abbott pitched 6.2 innings, allowing only one run, as he earned his tenth win of the season, as the Reds defeated the Cardinals 6-1.
- August 13 - Hunter Greene improved to 9-4 on the season after pitching seven innings and allowing only one run while striking out eight. Jeimer Candelario and Ty France each homered, as the Reds defeated St. Louis 4-1.
- August 14 - Jonathan India had four hits, including two home runs, drove home four runs and scored twice, while TJ Friedl also hit two home runs, as the Reds swept their series with the Cardinals, winning 9-2. With the win, the Reds tied St. Louis for second place in the division.
- August 16 - The Reds hosted a three-game interleague series against the Kansas City Royals. Tyler Stephenson had two hits and drove home the lone Reds run, as the Royals opened the series with a 7-1 win over Cincinnati.
- August 17 - Jeimer Candelario hit a solo home run, however, the Royals easily defeated Cincinnati by a 13-1 score.
- August 18 - Santiago Espinal had three hits and scored the only Reds run, as Cincinnati was swept by the Royals, losing the final game of the series by a score of 8-1.
- August 19 - The Reds are on the road for a three-game interleague series against the Toronto Blue Jays at Rogers Centre in Toronto, Ontario, Canada. TJ Friedl had three hits, including a solo home run, while Ty France had two hits, drove home two runners and scored a run, as the Reds defeated the Blue Jays 6-3.
- August 20 - Noelvi Marte and Jonathan India each had two hits, however, the Reds lost to the Blue Jays 10-3. Luke Maile pitched two scoreless innings for the Reds.
- August 21 - Elly De La Cruz hit his 22nd home run of the season and stole his 60th base, becoming the fifth player in MLB history to have at least 20 home runs and 60 stolen bases in a season, as the Reds rallied from a 6-0 deficit to defeat Toronto 11-7. De La Cruz is the third Reds player to accomplish this feat, joining Joe Morgan in 1973 and 1976, as well as Eric Davis in 1986.
- August 22 - The Reds wrapped up their road trip with a four-game series at PNC Park in Pittsburgh, Pennsylvania as they face their divisional rivals, the Pittsburgh Pirates. Cincinnati's offense was held to only five hits, as the Reds were shutout by the Pirates 7-0.
- August 23 - Tyler Stephenson had two hits, including a solo home run, and Santiago Espinal had three hits and drove home two runs, however, the Reds lost their second straight game, losing 6-5 to the Pirates.
- August 24 - Elly De La Cruz had three hits, scored three runs and drove home two runners, leading the Reds to a 10-2 win over the Pirates. Julian Aguiar earned his first career victory, pitching six innings, allowing only two runs.
- August 25 - Elly De La Cruz had two hits, scored a run and drove home a run in the Reds 4-3 loss to the Pirates.
- August 27 - The Reds returned home for a three-game interleague series against the Oakland Athletics. Tyler Stephenson had three hits and scored three runs, however, Cincinnati lost to Oakland 5-4.
- August 28 - Will Benson hit a three-run home run, capping off a six-run seventh inning for the Reds, however, the Athletics defeated Cincinnati 9-6. With the loss, the Reds have lost nine of their last twelve games.
- August 29 - Tyler Stephenson had three hits, including a home run, while TJ Friedl had the game winning hit, scoring Jonathan India and Elly De La Cruz, as the Reds rallied from behind to defeat the A's 10-9.
- August 30 - Game 1 - The Reds welcomed the Milwaukee Brewers for a four-game series, beginning with a doubleheader. In the first game of the doubleheader, Jonathan India and Santiago Espinal each connected for solo home runs, while Elly De La Cruz had two hits, scored a run and drove home another run, as the Reds lost to the Brewers 5-4.
- August 30 - Game 2 - Elly De La Cruz and Ty France each had two hits in the Reds 14-0 loss to the Brewers. The slumping Reds record dropped to 4-11 in their past fifteen games.
- August 31 - Spencer Steer had two hits and drove home two runs and Amed Rosario hit a two-run home run in the Reds 5-4 loss to the Brewers.

=== September ===
- September 1 - In the bottom of the 11th inning, Santiago Espinal drove home Rece Hinds with an infield single, lifting the Reds to a 4-3 victory over the Brewers.
- September 2 - The Reds welcomed the Houston Astros for a three-game interleague series to conclude their homestand. Ty France had four hits, scored a run and drove in another run, while Santiago Espinal had two hits, scored a run and drove home two runs, in the Reds 5-3 victory over the Astros.
- September 4 - Cincinnati scored nine runs in the first inning, as they defeated the Astros 12-5. Jonathan India hit a home run and Elly De La Cruz had three hits, scored three runs, drove home two runners and stole his 62nd base of the season.
- September 5 - Rhett Lowder pitched 6.1 innings of shutout baseball, however, he did not factor in the decision. Ty France had two hits, which included a solo home run in the seventh inning, as the Reds shutout the Astros 1-0 to sweep the series. Alexis Díaz earned his 25th save in the win.
- September 6 - The Reds travelled to Citi Field in Queens, New York for a three-game series against the New York Mets. Elly De La Cruz and TJ Friedl each hit two-run home runs in the Reds 6-4 loss to the Mets in ten innings. The loss snapped Cincinnati's four-game winning streak.
- September 7 - The Reds offense was held to six hits, as the Mets shutout Cincinnati 4-0. Jakob Junis pitched five scoreless innings in his start.
- September 8 - Santiago Espinal hit a two-run tie breaking double in the top of the ninth inning, as Cincinnati defeated the Mets 3-1. Alexis Díaz pitched a perfect bottom of the ninth, earning his 26th save.
- September 9 - The Reds travelled to Truist Park in Atlanta, Georgia for a makeup game against the Atlanta Braves that was rained out on July 24th. Ty France doubled home TJ Friedl in the second inning for the lone run of the game, as Nick Martinez pitched seven shutout innings, allowing two hits, leading Cincinnati to a 1-0 win over the Braves.
- September 10 - The Reds road trip continued in St. Louis, Missouri, as the club faced their divisional rivals, the St. Louis Cardinals for a three-game series at Busch Stadium. Rhett Lowder earned his first career victory, pitching five shutout innings, and lowered his season ERA to 0.59, leading the Reds to a 3-0 victory over the Cardinals. Elly De La Cruz stole two bases, bringing his season total to 64.
- September 11 - Santiago Espinal singled home Spencer Steer in the fourth inning, scoring the lone Reds run, as Cincinnati lost to the Cardinals 2-1. Noelvi Marte stole two bases for the Reds in the loss.
- September 12 - The Reds offense struggled, getting just four hits and scoring a run, as Cincinnati lost the final game of the series by a score of 6-1 to the Cardinals.
- September 13 - Cincinnati wrapped up their road trip with a three-game interleague series at Target Field in Minneapolis, Minnesota to face the Minnesota Twins. Elly De La Cruz hit his first career grand slam and TJ Friedl had three hits, including a solo home run, and drove home three runs, leading Cincinnati to a victory over the Twins 8-4.
- September 14 - TJ Friedl had four hits, including a two-run home run and Jake Fraley had three hits, including a solo home run, leading the Reds to a blowout victory of 11-1 over the Twins. Nick Martinez pitched six innings, allowing three hits and one run and striking out six to earn his ninth win of the year.
- September 15 - Tyler Stephenson had two hits and scored a run, however, the Reds lost the series finale, dropping the game 9-2 to the Twins.
- September 17 - Following an off day, the Reds kicked off their final homestand of the series with a three-game series against the Atlanta Braves. Spencer Steer hit a two-run go-ahead home run in the seventh inning, as the Reds overcame a four-run deficit to defeat the Braves 6-5.
- September 18 - TJ Friedl drove home the Reds lone run on a sacrifice fly, as Cincinnati lost to the Braves by a score of 7-1. With the loss, the Reds were officially eliminated from the post-season.
- September 19 - Elly De La Cruz had three hits and drove home a run and Blake Dunn had two hits, including his first career home run, and scored all three of the Reds runs in a 15-3 loss to Atlanta.
- September 20 - The Reds hosted the Pittsburgh Pirates for a three-game series, which was their final home series of the season. Tyler Stephenson had three hits, including a home run, scored three runs and drove home five, leading the Reds to a victory over the Pirates by a score of 8-3. Nick Martinez earned his tenth win of the season as he pitched six shutout innings, allowing two hits and striking out nine batters.
- September 21 - Elly De La Cruz hit his 25th home run of the season, a three-run shot, as he had three hits and drove home four runners in the Reds 7-1 win over the Pirates. Rhett Lowder pitched five shutout innings in his start to earn his second win of the season and lower his ERA to 1.40.
- September 22 - The Reds were limited to only three hits, as the Pirates shutout Cincinnati in their final home game of the season by a score of 2-0. Jonathan India had two of the Reds hits. Following the game, the Reds fired manager David Bell and named Freddie Benavides the interim manager for the remainder of the season.
- September 24 - After an off-day, the Reds visited Progressive Field in Cleveland, Ohio against the Cleveland Guardians for the final two games of the Ohio Cup. The Reds offense was held to only four hits, as the Guardians defeated the Reds 6-1.
- September 25 - TJ Friedl and Jake Fraley each scored runs for the Reds in a 5-2 loss to the Guardians. Cleveland captured the Ohio Cup as the won three of the four meetings between the clubs this season.
- September 27 - Following an off-day, the Reds head to Wrigley Field in Chicago, Illinois for a three-game season ending series against the Chicago Cubs. Cincinnati's offense struggled once again, getting only four hits in a 1-0 shutout loss to the Cubs. Nick Martinez pitched a complete game, allowing five hits and one run.
- September 28 - Cincinnati was shutout for the second game in a row, and lost their fifth consecutive game, as the Cubs defeated the Reds 3-0. Rhett Lowder pitched five shutout innings, dropping his season ERA to 1.17. The Reds offense was limited to only three hits.
- September 29 - Elly De La Cruz hit a two-run double in the tenth inning, breaking a scoreless tie, as the Reds shutout the Cubs 3-0 in their final game of the season. De La Cruz also stole two bases, leading MLB with 67 stolen bases. Cincinnati finished the season with a 77-85 record.

=== Transactions ===
==== March 2024 ====
March 27	Recalled OF Bubba Thompson from Louisville Bats. Placed SS Matt McLain (left shoulder injury) on the 10-day injured list. Placed CF TJ Friedl (right wrist fracture) on the 10-day injured list retroactive to March 25. Placed LHP Alex Young (lower back disc degeneration) on the 15-day injured list retroactive to March 25. Placed LHP Brandon Williamson (left shoulder strain) on the 15-day injured list retroactive to March 25. Placed LHP Nick Lodolo (left calf tenosynovitis) on the 15-day injured list retroactive to March 25. Placed LHP Sam Moll (left shoulder impingement) on the 15-day injured list retroactive to March 25. Placed RHP Ian Gibaut (right forearm strain) on the 15-day injured list retroactive to March 25.
March 28	Transferred SS Matt McLain (left shoulder surgery) from the 10-day injured list to the 60-day injured list. Claimed RHP Yosver Zulueta off waivers from Toronto Blue Jays. Optioned RHP Yosver Zulueta to Louisville Bats.
March 29	Signed free agent 1B Mike Ford from Seattle Mariners to a minor league contract. Sent LHP Sam Moll on a rehab assignment to Louisville Bats.
March 30	Signed free agent C Jorge Puerta from Los Angeles Dodgers to a minor league contract.
March 31	Sent LHP Nick Lodolo on a rehab assignment to Louisville Bats.

==== April 2024 ====
April 1	Signed free agent 3B Hansel Jimenez to a minor league contract.
April 5	Sent RHP Ian Gibaut on a rehab assignment to Dayton Dragons.
April 8	Placed RHP Tejay Antone (right elbow inflammation) on the 15-day injured list. Recalled RHP Carson Spiers from Louisville Bats.
April 10	Sent RHP Ian Gibaut on a rehab assignment to Louisville Bats.
April 13	Activated LHP Nick Lodolo from the 15-day injured list. Optioned RHP Carson Spiers to Louisville Bats. Sent LHP Sam Moll on a rehab assignment to Louisville Bats.
April 19	Claimed SS Liván Soto off waivers from Baltimore Orioles. Optioned SS Liván Soto to Louisville Bats. Transferred RHP Tejay Antone (right elbow surgery) from the 15-day injured list to the 60-day injured list.
April 20	Signed free agent RHP Bryan Salgado to a minor league contract.
April 22	Placed RHP Frankie Montas (right forearm contusion) on the 15-day injured list. Recalled RHP Casey Legumina from Louisville Bats.
April 23	Activated LHP Sam Moll from the 15-day injured list. Optioned RHP Casey Legumina to Louisville Bats.
April 24	Claimed CF Peyton Burdick off waivers from Baltimore Orioles. Optioned CF Peyton Burdick to Louisville Bats. Sent RHP Ian Gibaut on a rehab assignment to Louisville Bats. Transferred LHP Alex Young (lower back disc degeneration) from the 15-day injured list to the 60-day injured list.

==== May 2024 ====
May 2	Sent LHP Alex Young on a rehab assignment to Louisville Bats.
May 3	Signed free agent C Emdys Rosillo to a minor league contract. Signed free agent LHP Ariel De La Cruz to a minor league contract. Signed free agent RHP Carlos Meza to a minor league contract.
May 6	Optioned LHP Sam Moll to Louisville Bats.
May 7	Activated CF TJ Friedl from the 10-day injured list. Placed RHP Ian Gibaut on the 60-day injured list. Activated RHP Frankie Montas from the 15-day injured list. Optioned OF Bubba Thompson to Chattanooga Lookouts. Selected contract of CF Conner Capel from Louisville Bats. Traded LHP Tyler Gilbert to Philadelphia Phillies for cash. Optioned LF Nick Martini to Louisville Bats.
May 8	Signed free agent 1B Mike Ford from Louisville Bats to a one-year, $1.3 million contract. Placed 3B Christian Encarnacion-Strand (right ulnar styloid fracture) on the 10-day injured list. Transferred LHP Brandon Williamson (left shoulder injury) from the 15-day injured list to the 60-day injured list. Activated 1B Mike Ford.
May 13	Placed CF TJ Friedl (left thumb fracture) on the 10-day injured list. Recalled OF Jacob Hurtubise from Louisville Bats.
May 14	Sent LHP Brandon Williamson on a rehab assignment to Dayton Dragons.
May 15	Placed LHP Nick Lodolo (left groin strain) on the 15-day injured list retroactive to May 12. Recalled LHP Sam Moll from Louisville Bats. Signed free agent RHP Anthony Aquino to a minor league contract.
May 17	Placed LHP Justin Wilson (left shoulder tightness) on the 15-day injured list. Recalled RHP Carson Spiers from Louisville Bats
May 19	Sent LHP Brandon Williamson on a rehab assignment to Louisville Bats.
May 21	Optioned CF Conner Capel to Louisville Bats. Recalled LF Nick Martini from Louisville Bats.
May 23	Placed RHP Emilio Pagán (right triceps tightness) on the 15-day injured list retroactive to May 20. Designated OF Bubba Thompson for assignment. Selected the contract of RHP Brett Kennedy from Louisville Bats.
May 24	Signed free agent LHP Brandon Leibrandt from the High Point Rockers of the Atlantic League of Professional Baseball to a minor league contract. Signed free agent SS JeanPierre Ortiz from Falmouth Commodores of the Cape Cod Baseball League to a minor league contract. Signed free agent RHP Drew Pestka to a minor league contract.
May 25	Sent OF Bubba Thompson outright to Chattanooga Lookouts.
May 27	Optioned RHP Carson Spiers to Louisville Bats. Activated LHP Nick Lodolo from the 15-day injured list.
May 28	Designated RHP Brett Kennedy for assignment. Activated LHP Alex Young from the 60-day injured list.
May 29	Designated 1B Mike Ford for assignment. Activated CF TJ Friedl from the 10-day injured list.
May 30	Sent RHP Brett Kennedy outright to Louisville Bats.
May 31	1B Mike Ford elected free agency - (signed a one-year contract with Yokohama DeNA BayStars of Nippon Professional Baseball on July 4).

==== June 2024 ====
June 2	Optioned LHP Alex Young to Louisville Bats. Activated LHP Justin Wilson from the 15-day injured list.
June 4	Optioned LF Nick Martini to Louisville Bats. Selected the contract of OF Blake Dunn from Louisville Bats.
June 6	Optioned RHP Graham Ashcraft to Louisville Bats. Activated RHP Emilio Pagán from the 15-day injured list.
June 7	Signed free agent LHP Justus Sheffield from the Atlanta Braves to a minor league contract.
June 9	Placed RHP Emilio Pagán (right lat strain) on the 15-day injured list. Recalled RHP Carson Spiers from Louisville Bats.
June 12	Signed free agent RHP Juan Polo to a minor league contract.
June 13	Optioned OF Blake Dunn to Louisville Bats.
June 14	Recalled LF Nick Martini from Louisville Bats.
June 17	Transferred 3B Christian Encarnacion-Strand (right ulnar styloid fracture) from the 15-day injured list to the 60-day injured list. Selected the contract of RHP Brooks Kriske from Louisville Bats. Optioned RHP Brooks Kriske to Louisville Bats.
June 18	Signed free agent 3B Edwin Ríos to a minor league contract.
June 21	Designated CF Conner Capel for assignment. Optioned OF Jacob Hurtubise to Louisville Bats. Selected the contract of C Austin Wynns from Louisville Bats.
June 23	Sent CF Conner Capel outright to Louisville Bats. Designated C Austin Wynns for assignment. Recalled SS Liván Soto from Louisville Bats.
June 24	Placed CF TJ Friedl (right hamstring strain) on the 10-day injured list. Selected the contract of SS Levi Jordan from Louisville Bats. Signed free agent RHP Victor Vargas from Milwaukee Milkmen of American Association of Professional Baseball to a minor league contract.
June 25	Placed LHP Nick Lodolo (left finger blister) on the 15-day injured list. Recalled RHP Yosver Zulueta from Louisville Bats. Sent C Austin Wynns outright to Louisville Bats.
June 26	Optioned RHP Yosver Zulueta to Louisville Bats. Recalled RHP Graham Ashcraft from Louisville Bats.
June 27	Optioned SS Liván Soto to Louisville Bats. Activated SS Noelvi Marte. Transferred RHP Emilio Pagán (right lat strain) from the 15-day injured list to the 60-day injured list.
June 28	Designated CF Peyton Burdick for assignment. Placed C Tyler Stephenson on the paternity list. Selected the contract of C Austin Wynns from Louisville Bats.
June 29	Signed free agent RHP Grant Gavin from Kansas City Monarchs of American Association of Professional Baseball to a minor league contract.
June 30	Sent CF Peyton Burdick outright to Louisville Bats.

==== July 2024 ====
July 2	Designated C Austin Wynns for assignment. Activated C Tyler Stephenson.
July 3	Optioned SS Levi Jordan to Louisville Bats. Recalled OF Blake Dunn from Louisville Bats.
July 4	Sent C Austin Wynns outright to Louisville Bats.
July 5	Placed C Luke Maile (herniated disc in back) on the 10-day injured list. Designated SS Levi Jordan for assignment. Placed CF Jake Fraley on the paternity list. Selected the contract of 3B Edwin Rios from Louisville Bats. Selected the contract of C Austin Wynns from Louisville Bats.
July 7	Placed LF Nick Martini (left thumb injury) on the 10-day injured list. Placed OF Stuart Fairchild (spine disc injury) on the 10-day injured list. Recalled SS Livan Soto from Louisville Bats. Acquired LF Austin Slater and cash from San Francisco Giants for LHP Alex Young.
July 8	Optioned RHP Graham Ashcraft to Louisville Bats. Recalled OF Rece Hinds from Louisville Bats. Recalled RHP Yosver Zulueta from Louisville Bats.
July 9	Activated LHP Nick Lodolo from the 15-day injured list. Activated LF Austin Slater. Optioned SS Livan Soto to Louisville Bats. Optioned RHP Yosver Zulueta to Louisville Bats. Signed free agent LF Tony Kemp from Minnesota Twins to a minor league contract.
July 10	Activated CF Jake Fraley; Placed RHP Graham Ashcraft (right elbow strain) on the 15-day injured list retroactive to July 8. Optioned OF Blake Dunn to Louisville Bats.
July 13	Placed RHP Carson Spiers (right shoulder impingement) on the 15-day injured list. Transferred LF Nick Martini (left thumb sprain) from the 10-day injured list to the 60-day injured list. Selected the contract of RHP Tony Santillan from Louisville Bats. RHP Patrick Weigel assigned to the Reds.
July 19	Activated CF Stuart Fairchild from the 10-day injured list. Designated 3B Edwin Rios for assignment.
July 20	Placed LHP Brent Suter (partial tear of left Teras major muscle) on the 15-day injured list. Recalled RHP Casey Legumina from Louisville Bats. Sent 3B Edwin Rios outright to Louisville Bats.
July 21	Sent CF TJ Friedl on a rehab assignment to Louisville Bats.
July 22	Signed OF Anthony Stephan. Signed RHP Jordan Little. Signed RHP Jimmy Romano. Signed C Yanuel Casiano. Signed C Ryan McCrystal. Signed 2B Peyton Stovall. Signed C Jacob Friend.
July 23	Signed free agent 3B Edwin Ríos to a minor league contract. Optioned RHP Casey Legumina to Louisville Bats. Recalled RHP Lyon Richardson from Louisville Bats. Signed RHP Will Cannon. Signed RHP Trent Hodgdon. Signed LHP Tristan Smith. Signed RHP Luke Holman.
July 24	Recalled RHP Yosver Zulueta from Louisville Bats.
July 25	Optioned RHP Lyon Richardson to Louisville Bats.
July 26	Activated CF TJ Friedl from the 10-day injured list. Optioned OF Rece Hinds to Louisville Bats. Signed RHP Edgar Colon. Signed SS Tyson Lewis.
July 29	Traded C Andruw Salcedo to Seattle Mariners for 3B Ty France and cash. Transferred RHP Graham Ashcraft (right elbow strain) from 15-day injured list to 60-day injured list. Placed C Austin Wynns (right teres major tear) on the 10-day injured list. Activated RHP Carson Spiers from the 15-day injured list. Optioned RHP Yosver Zulueta to Louisville Bats. Selected the contract of C Eric Yang from Louisville Bats.
July 30	Traded RHP Frankie Montas to Milwaukee Brewers for RHP Jakob Junis, OF Joey Wiemer and cash. Designated SS Liván Soto for assignment. Traded LF Austin Slater, SS Liván Soto and cash to Baltimore Orioles for player to be named later. Traded RHP Lucas Sims to Boston Red Sox for RHP Ovis Portes. Sent C Luke Maile on a rehab assignment to Louisville Bats. Optioned OF Joey Wiemer to Louisville Bats. Recalled RHP Yosver Zulueta from Louisville Bats. Activated 3B Ty France. Recalled RHP Lyon Richardson from Louisville Bats.
July 31	Activated RHP Jakob Junis. Optioned RHP Lyon Richardson to Louisville Bats. Signed 3B Jalen Hairston.

==== August 2024 ====
August 1	Signed free agent RHP Víctor Díaz to a minor league contract.
August 2	Activated C Luke Maile from the 10-day injured list. Optioned C Eric Yang to Louisville Bats.
August 3	Sent RHP Emilio Pagán on a rehab assignment to Louisville Bats.
August 4	Placed OF Will Benson on the paternity list. Recalled OF Joey Wiemer from Louisville Bats.
August 5	Sent C Eric Yang outright to Louisville Bats. Signed free agent RHP Stephen Quigley to a minor league contract.
August 6	Signed free agent C Tucker Barnhart from Arizona Diamondbacks to a minor league contract.
August 7	Activated OF Will Benson from the paternity list. Optioned OF Joey Wiemer to Louisville Bats. Signed free agent RHP Casey Kelly from LG Twins of the KBO League to a minor league contract.
August 10	Activated RHP Emilio Pagán from the 60-day injured list. Optioned RHP Yosver Zulueta to Louisville Bats.
August 17	Placed RHP Hunter Greene (right elbow soreness) on the 15-day injured list.
August 18	Recalled RHP Casey Legumina from Louisville Bats. Claimed SS Amed Rosario off waivers from Los Angeles Dodgers.
August 19	Selected the contract of RHP Julian Aguiar from Louisville Bats. Recalled RHP Christian Roa from Louisville Bats. Optioned RHP Casey Legumina to Louisville Bats. Placed RHP Christian Roa (right shoulder sprain) on the 60-day injured list.
August 20	Placed 3B Jeimer Candelario (left great toe fracture) on the 10-day injured list. Activated SS Amed Rosario.
August 22	Placed RF Jake Fraley (right knee sprain) on the 10-day injured list. Signed 1B Dominic Smith from the Boston Red Sox to a one-year contract. Sent LHP Brent Suter on a rehab assignment to Louisville Bats. Designated RHP Brooks Kriske for assignment.
August 23	Placed LHP Andrew Abbott (left shoulder strain) on the 15-day injured list. Transferred C Austin Wynns (right teres major tear) from the 10-day injured list to the 60-day injured list. Selected the contract of RHP Alan Busenitz from Louisville Bats.
August 24	Designated RHP Alan Busenitz for assignment. Selected the contract of RHP Casey Kelly from Louisville Bats.
August 25	Baltimore Orioles claimed RHP Brooks Kriske off waivers.
August 26	Sent RHP Alan Busenitz outright to Louisville Bats.
August 27	Placed LHP Nick Lodolo (left middle finger sprain) on the 15-day injured list. Placed OF Stuart Fairchild (left thumb sprain) on the 10-day injured list. Sent LHP Brandon Williamson on a rehab assignment to Louisville Bats. Acquired RHP David Buchanan from Philadelphia Phillies for cash. Recalled RHP Casey Legumina from Louisville Bats. Recalled OF Rece Hinds from Louisville Bats.
August 28	Transferred OF Stuart Fairchild (left thumb sprain) from the 10-day injured list to the 60-day injured list. Selected the contract of LHP Evan Kravetz from Louisville Bats. Optioned RHP Casey Legumina to Louisville Bats.
August 29	Designated RHP Casey Kelly for assignment. Selected the contract of LHP Brandon Leibrandt from Louisville Bats.
August 30	Designated 3B Davis Wendzel for assignment. Selected the contract of RHP Rhett Lowder from Louisville Bats. Optioned LHP Brandon Leibrandt to Louisville Bats. Recalled RHP Yosver Zulueta from Louisville Bats.
August 31	Designated LHP Evan Kravetz for assignment. Optioned RHP Yosver Zulueta to Louisville Bats. Sent RHP Casey Kelly outright to Louisville Bats. Selected the contract of RHP David Buchanan from Louisville Bats.

==== September 2024 ====
September 1	Designated RHP David Buchanan for assignment. Activated LHP Brent Suter from the 15-day injured list. Activated LHP Brandon Williamson from the 60-day injured list. Activated RF Jake Fraley from the 10-day injured list.
September 2	Designated 1B Dominic Smith for assignment. Sent 3B Davis Wendzel outright to Louisville Bats. Recalled OF Blake Dunn from Louisville Bats. Sent LHP Evan Kravetz outright to Louisville Bats.
September 3	Sent 1B Dominic Smith outright to Louisville Bats. Sent RHP David Buchanan outright to Louisville Bats.
September 8	Placed LHP Sam Moll (left shoulder impingement) on the 15-day injured list. Recalled RHP Casey Legumina from Louisville Bats.
September 14	Sent RF Nick Martini on a rehab assignment to Louisville Bats.
September 15	Sent RHP Ian Gibaut on a rehab assignment to Louisville Bats.
September 18	Placed LHP Brandon Williamson (left elbow strain) on the 15-day injured list. Recalled LHP Brandon Leibrandt from Louisville Bats.
September 19	Optioned RHP Casey Legumina to Louisville Bats. Recalled RHP Yosver Zulueta from Louisville Bats.
September 20	Optioned LHP Brandon Leibrandt to Louisville Bats. Selected the contract of RHP Alan Busenitz from Louisville Bats.
September 22	Designated RHP Alan Busenitz for assignment. Activated RHP Hunter Greene from the 15-day injured list.
September 24	Activated OF Nick Martini from the 60-day injured list. Placed RHP Julian Aguiar on the 15-day injured list (right elbow sprain). Activated RHP Ian Gibaut from the 60-day injured list. Transferred LHP Brandon Williamson from the 15-day injured list to the 60-day injured list (Left elbow sprain). Sent RHP Alan Busenitz outright to Louisville Bats. Optioned LHP Brandon Williamson to ACL Reds. Optioned OF Nick Martini to ACL Reds.

== Roster ==
2024 Cincinnati Reds
Roster
Pitchers: 41 Andrew Abbott; 39 Julian Aguiar; 70 Tejay Antone; 51 Graham Ashcraft; 58 David Buchanan; 49 Alan Busenitz; 63 Fernando Cruz; 43 Alexis Díaz; 46 Buck Farmer; 79 Ian Gibaut; 21 Hunter Greene; 47 Jakob Junis; 84 Casey Kelly; 66 Evan Kravetz; 65 Casey Legumina; 82 Brandon Leibrandt; 40 Nick Lodolo; 81 Rhett Lowder; 28 Nick Martinez; 50 Sam Moll; 47 Frankie Montas; 15 Emilio Pagán; 72 Lyon Richardson; 64 Tony Santillan; 39 Lucas Sims; 68 Carson Spiers; 31 Brent Suter; 55 Brandon Williamson; 32 Justin Wilson; 48 Alex Young; 67 Yosver Zulueta	Catchers: 22 Luke Maile; 37 Tyler Stephenson; 35 Austin Wynns; Infielders: 3 Jeimer Candelario; 44 Elly De La Cruz; 33 Christian Encarnacion-Strand; 4 Santiago Espinal; 38 Mike Ford; 2 Ty France; 6 Jonathan India; 16 Noelvi Marte; 71 Edwin Ríos; 0 Dominic Smith	Outfielders: 30 Will Benson; 49 Conner Capel; 76 Blake Dunn; 17 Stuart Fairchild; 27 Jake Fraley; 29 TJ Friedl; 77 Rece Hinds; 26 Jacob Hurtubise; 53 Levi Jordan; 23 Nick Martini; 38 Amed Rosario; 48 Austin Slater; 7 Spencer Steer; 12 Bubba Thompson; 48 Joey Wiemer; Other batters: 38 Liván Soto; 69 Eric Yang	Manager: 25 David Bell; 45 Freddie Benavides; Coaches: 92 Kyle Arnsberg (assistant coach); 45 Freddie Benavides (bench); 60 Terry Bradshaw (assistant hitting); 54 Collin Cowgill (first base); 91 Jose Duarte (bullpen catcher); 56 J. R. House (third base/catching); 36 Derek Johnson (director of pitching); 75 Tim LaMonte (assistant hitting coach/integrated performance coach); 88 Alon Leichman (assistant pitching); 62 Joel McKeithan (hitting/offensive coordinator); 90 Matt Tracy (bullpen)

== Player stats ==
= Indicates team leader

= Indicates league leader

=== Batting ===
Note: G = Games played; AB = At bats; R = Runs scored; H = Hits; 2B = Doubles; 3B = Triples; HR = Home runs; RBI = Runs batted in; SB = Stolen bases; BB = Walks; AVG = Batting average; SLG = Slugging average

Player	G	AB	R	H	2B	3B	HR	RBI	SB	BB	AVG	SLG
Elly De La Cruz	160	618	105	160	36	10	25	76	67	69	.259	.471
Spencer Steer	158	574	74	129	34	4	20	92	25	72	.225	.402
Jonathan India	151	533	84	132	28	2	15	58	13	80	.248	.392
Tyler Stephenson	138	457	69	118	26	1	19	66	1	48	.258	.444
Jeimer Candelario	112	427	47	96	23	2	20	56	4	27	.225	.429
Santiago Espinal	118	357	32	88	12	0	9	45	11	24	.246	.356
Jake Fraley	116	350	44	97	19	2	5	26	20	26	.277	.386
Will Benson	128	343	41	64	19	2	14	43	16	40	.187	.376
TJ Friedl	85	297	35	67	5	1	13	55	9	26	.226	.380
Noelvi Marte	66	229	24	48	9	0	4	18	9	9	.210	.301
Stuart Fairchild	94	209	33	45	8	0	8	30	13	17	.215	.368
Ty France	52	179	18	45	10	0	5	20	1	10	.251	.391
Nick Martini	52	146	23	31	4	2	5	24	1	9	.212	.370
Luke Maile	53	135	8	24	4	0	2	8	2	13	.178	.252
Christian Encarnacion-Strand	29	116	13	22	6	0	2	16	0	4	.190	.293
Mike Ford	17	60	2	9	0	1	1	4	0	2	.150	.233
Amed Rosario	22	57	6	9	0	0	1	4	3	1	.158	.211
Jacob Hurtubise	29	54	7	10	1	1	0	4	2	6	.185	.241
Rece Hinds	24	46	9	12	4	1	5	11	2	4	.261	.717
Blake Dunn	19	26	8	4	1	0	1	1	2	2	.154	.308
Dominic Smith	9	26	4	5	2	0	0	0	0	3	.192	.269
Austin Wynns	7	19	3	7	4	0	0	2	0	0	.368	.579
Austin Slater	8	18	2	2	0	0	0	3	0	2	.111	.111
Bubba Thompson	17	18	5	2	1	0	0	0	5	0	.111	.167
Levi Jordan	7	10	1	1	1	0	0	1	0	0	.100	.200
Edwin Ríos	5	9	1	1	0	0	0	0	0	1	.111	.111
Conner Capel	5	8	1	2	0	0	0	0	1	0	.250	.250
Livan Soto	1	3	0	0	0	0	0	0	0	0	.000	.000
Eric Yang	1	1	0	0	0	0	0	0	0	0	.000	.000
Joey Wiemer	2	0	0	0	0	0	0	0	0	1	.---	.---
Team totals	162	5325	699	1230	257	29	174	663	207	496	.231	.388

Source:Baseball Reference

=== Pitching ===
Note: W = Wins; L = Losses; ERA = Earned run average; G = Games pitched; GS = Games started; SV = Saves; IP = Innings pitched; H = Hits allowed; R = Runs allowed; ER = Earned runs allowed; BB = Walks allowed; SO = Strikeouts

Player	W	L	ERA	G	GS	SV	IP	H	R	ER	BB	SO
Hunter Greene	9	5	2.75	26	26	0	150.1	96	47	46	57	169
Nick Martinez	10	7	3.10	42	16	0	142.1	128	46	49	18	116
Andrew Abbott	10	10	3.72	25	25	0	138.0	127	60	57	52	114
Nick Lodolo	9	6	4.76	21	21	0	115.1	101	62	61	37	122
Frankie Montas	4	8	5.01	19	19	0	93.1	93	56	52	41	78
Carson Spiers	5	7	5.46	22	10	0	90.2	112	59	55	27	80
Graham Ashcraft	5	5	5.24	15	15	0	77.1	89	50	45	27	57
Buck Farmer	3	2	3.04	61	1	1	71.0	56	25	24	29	70
Fernando Cruz	3	8	4.86	69	3	0	66.2	54	36	36	35	109
Brent Suter	1	0	3.15	47	3	2	65.2	63	25	23	12	50
Alexis Díaz	2	5	3.99	60	0	28	56.1	42	31	25	31	55
Justin Wilson	1	5	5.59	60	0	2	46.2	55	30	29	13	51
Jakob Junis	0	0	2.85	14	5	0	41.0	29	13	13	3	32
Emilio Pagán	4	5	4.50	38	1	1	38.0	40	20	19	11	44
Sam Moll	3	2	3.35	48	0	0	37.2	27	16	14	14	38
Lucas Sims	1	4	3.57	43	0	1	35.1	30	14	14	20	40
Julian Aguiar	2	1	6.25	7	7	0	31.2	30	22	22	12	19
Rhett Lowder	2	2	1.17	6	6	0	30.2	25	4	4	14	22
Tony Santillan	3	3	3.00	29	1	0	30.0	21	11	10	9	46
Yosver Zulueta	0	0	4.96	12	0	0	16.1	15	10	9	7	20
Brandon Williamson	0	0	3.77	4	3	0	14.1	10	7	6	5	12
Casey Legumina	0	0	8.68	6	0	0	9.1	15	11	9	2	7
Brandon Leibrandt	0	0	9.95	2	0	0	6.1	11	7	7	2	5
Casey Kelly	0	0	5.06	2	0	1	5.1	5	3	3	1	4
Alan Busenitz	0	0	13.50	3	0	0	4.0	9	7	6	0	3
Luke Maile	0	0	14.73	3	0	0	3.2	6	6	6	0	0
David Buchanan	0	0	2.70	1	0	0	3.1	2	1	1	2	1
Ian Gibaut	0	0	4.50	2	0	0	2.0	3	1	1	1	1
Alex Young	0	0	0.00	3	0	0	2.0	4	0	0	0	2
Tejay Antone	0	0	4.50	4	0	0	2.0	2	2	1	4	2
Evan Kravetz	0	0	0.00	1	0	0	0.2	0	0	0	0	0
Lyon Richardson	0	0	27.00	1	0	0	0.2	2	2	2	1	1
Team totals	77	85	4.09	162	162	36	1428.0	1302	694	649	487	1370

Note: No Earned Run Average qualifiers (ERA) on team (1 inning pitched per scheduled game, minimum 162 innings pitched).

Source:Baseball Reference

== Farm system ==
Level	Team	League	Manager
AAA	Louisville Bats	International League	Pat Kelly
AA	Chattanooga Lookouts	Southern League	José Moreno
High-A	Dayton Dragons	Midwest League	Vince Harrison
Low-A	Daytona Tortugas	Florida State League	Julio Morillo
Rookie	ACL Reds	Arizona Complex League	Gustavo Molina
Foreign Rookie	DSL Reds	Dominican Summer League	Juan Ballara
