= Blake Dunn =

American baseball player (born 1998)

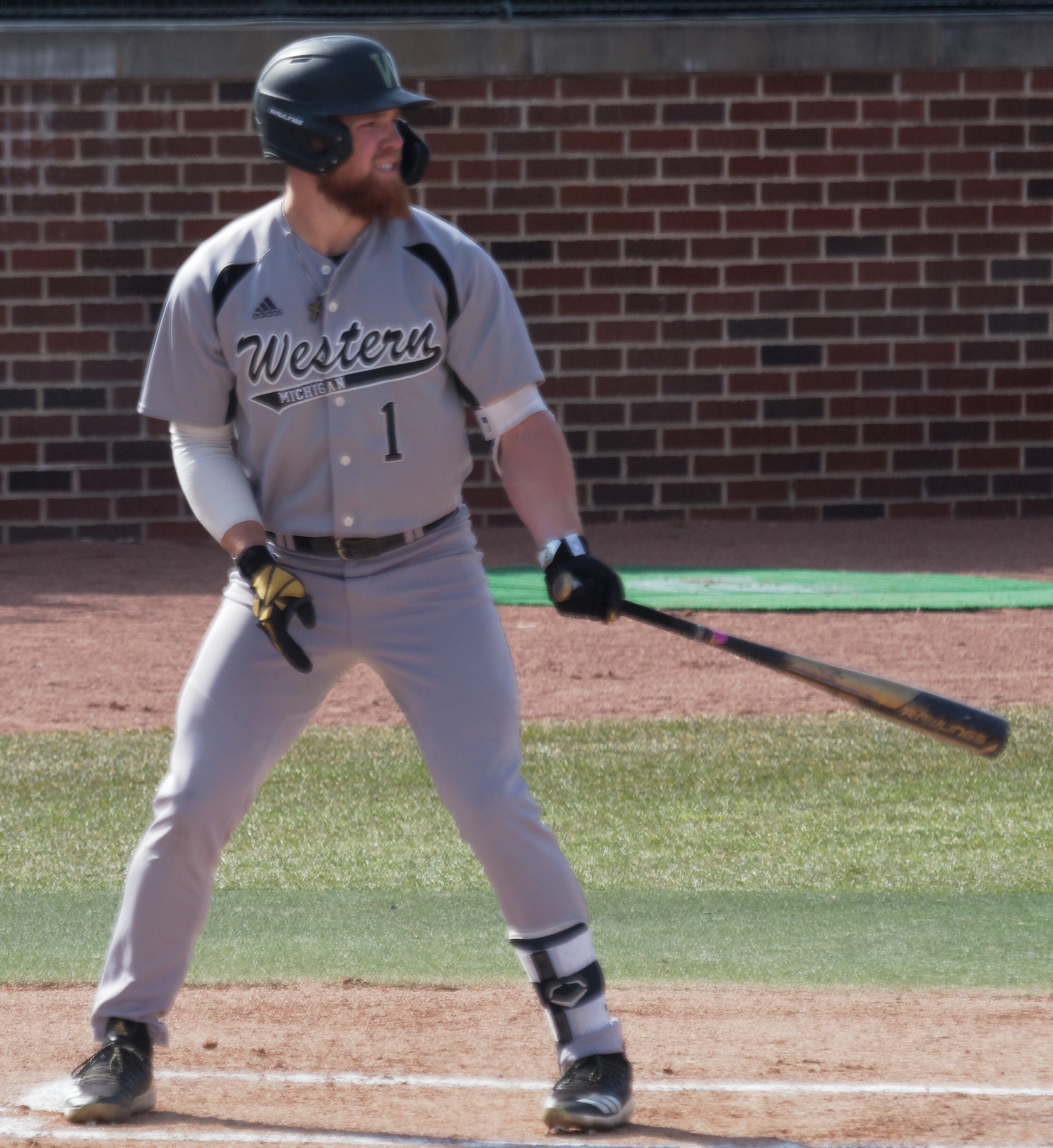
- Dunn with Western Michigan in 2018

Cincinnati Reds – No. 59
- Outfielder
- Born: September 5, 1998 (age 28); Holland, Michigan, U.S.
- Bats: Right Throws: Right

MLB debut
- June 4, 2024, for the Cincinnati Reds

MLB statistics (through 2026 season)
- Batting average: .232
- Home runs: 4
- Runs batted in: 15
- Stats at Baseball Reference

Teams
- Cincinnati Reds (2024–present)

Blake William Dunn (born September 5, 1998) is an American professional baseball outfielder for the Cincinnati Reds of Major League Baseball (MLB). He made his MLB debut in 2024.

== Early life and amateur career ==
Dunn attended Saugatuck High School in Saugatuck, Michigan. He enrolled at Western Michigan University and played college baseball for the Western Michigan Broncos for four seasons. He was named first team All-Mid-American Conference (MAC) as a sophomore after hitting .374 with five home runs, nine doubles, two triples, and 30 stolen bases. In 2019, he played collegiate summer baseball with the Falmouth Commodores of the Cape Cod Baseball League, and in 2020 and 2021 with the Kalamazoo Growlers of the Northwoods League. Dunn batted .288 with four doubles, two home runs, and 11 stolen bases in 15 games during his junior season before it was cut short due to the coronavirus pandemic. Dunn batted .305 as a senior.

== Professional career ==
The Cincinnati Reds selected Dunn in the 15th round (450th overall) of the 2021 Major League Baseball draft. After signing with the team, he was assigned to the Rookie-level Arizona Complex League Reds before being promoted to the Daytona Tortugas of Low-A Southeast. Dunn hit .286 over 11 total minor league games. He returned to Daytona in 2021, but missed most of the season due to a shoulder injury and finished the season with a .290 batting average in 33 games played. Dunn was assigned to the High-A Dayton Dragons to begin the 2023 season. He was promoted to the Double-A Chattanooga Lookouts after hitting .276 with eight home runs and 19 stolen bases over 47 games played.

Dunn began the 2024 season with the Triple–A Louisville Bats, hitting .223/.348/.378 with four home runs, 22 RBI, and nine stolen bases across 44 games. On June 4, 2024, Dunn was selected to the 40-man roster and promoted to the major leagues for the first time. He made his MLB debut the same day against the Colorado Rockies. Dunn played in 19 games for Cincinnati during his rookie campaign, batting .154/.241/.308 with one home run, one RBI, and two stolen bases.

Dunn made 30 appearances for Cincinnati during the 2025 season, slashing .150/.320/.233 with one home run, seven RBI, and two stolen bases.

Dunn was optioned to Triple-A Louisville to begin the 2026 season. He made 38 appearances for Cincinnati, slashing .282/.335/.387 with a career-high two home runs, seven RBI, and six stolen bases (also a career-high). On July 31, 2026, manager Terry Francona announced that Dunn would require season–ending elbow surgery. On September 16, he underwent an ulnar nerve transposition procedure.
