= Edwin Arroyo =

Puerto Rican baseball player (born 2003)

Cincinnati Reds – No. 2
- Infielder
- Born: August 25, 2003 (age 23); Arecibo, Puerto Rico
- Bats: Switch Throws: Right

MLB debut
- June 1, 2026, for the Cincinnati Reds

MLB statistics (through 2026 season)
- Batting average: .223
- Home runs: 0
- Runs batted in: 5
- Stats at Baseball Reference

Teams
- Cincinnati Reds (2026–present)

Edwin Zaed Arroyo (born August 25, 2003) is a Puerto Rican professional baseball infielder for the Cincinnati Reds of Major League Baseball (MLB). He made his MLB debut in 2026.

== Amateur career ==
Arroyo attended Arecibo Baseball Academy in Arecibo, Puerto Rico before coming to the United States to attend Central Pointe Christian Academy in Kissimmee, Florida for his senior season.

== Professional career ==
=== Seattle Mariners ===
Arroyo was drafted by the Seattle Mariners in the second round (48th overall) of the 2021 Major League Baseball draft. He made his professional debut that August with the rookie–level Arizona Complex League Mariners, hitting .211 with two home runs and 10 RBI across 21 games. Arroyo began the 2022 season with the Single–A Modesto Nuts, slashing .316/.385/.514 with 13 home runs, 67 RBI, and 21 stolen bases across 87 appearances.

=== Cincinnati Reds ===
On July 29, 2022, the Mariners traded Arroyo, Noelvi Marte, Andrew Moore, and Levi Stoudt to the Cincinnati Reds in exchange for pitcher Luis Castillo. He spent the remainder of the year with the Single–A Daytona Tortugas, hitting .227 with one home run and 16 RBI over 27 games; he also went 0–for–6 with one RBI across six appearances for the rookie–level Arizona Complex League Reds. Arroyo won the 2023 Midwest League Top MLB Prospect Award with the Dayton Dragons.

On March 20, 2024, Arroyo underwent season-ending surgery to repair a torn labrum in his left shoulder. The injury occurred when he dove back to a base on a pickoff attempt during spring training.

In 2025, Arroyo made 120 appearances for the Double-A Chattanooga Lookouts, batting .284/.345/.371 with three home runs, 44 RBI, and 12 stolen bases. On November 18, 2025, the Reds added Arroyo to their 40-man roster to protect him from the Rule 5 draft.

Arroyo was optioned to the Triple-A Louisville Bats to begin the 2026 season. In 53 appearances for the Bats, he batted .323/.383/.562 with 11 home runs, 34 RBI, and nine stolen bases. On June 1, 2026, following an injury to Elly De La Cruz, the Reds promoted Arroyo to the major leagues for the first time.

== International career ==
Arroyo was selected to represent the Puerto Rico national baseball team at the 2026 World Baseball Classic. He was the youngest member of the roster at 22 years old. He appeared as a pinch runner and second baseman, making just two plate appearances in the tournament.
