= Eric Yang =

American baseball player (born 1998)

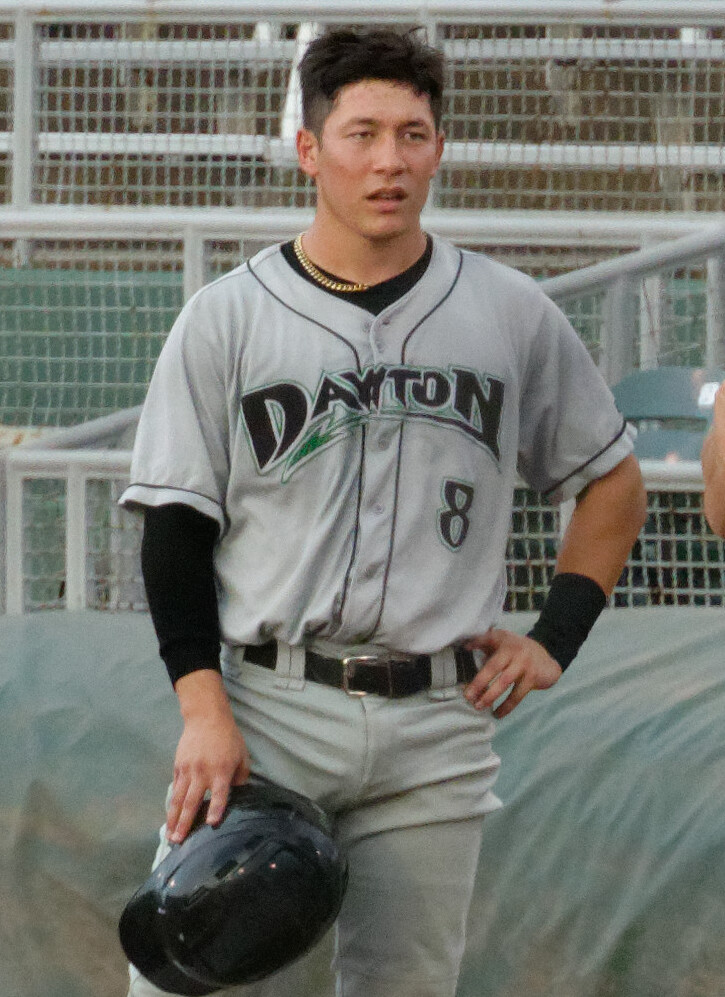
- Yang with the Dayton Dragons in 2021

Free agent
- Catcher
- Born: March 26, 1998 (age 28); Woodland Hills, California, U.S.
- Bats: Right Throws: Right

MLB debut
- July 31, 2024, for the Cincinnati Reds

MLB statistics (through 2024 season)
- Batting average: .000
- Home runs: 0
- Runs batted in: 0
- Stats at Baseball Reference

Teams
- Cincinnati Reds (2024)

Eric Lawrence Yang (born March 26, 1998) is an American professional baseball catcher who is a free agent. He has previously played in Major League Baseball (MLB) for the Cincinnati Reds.

== Career ==
=== Cincinnati Reds ===
Yang was drafted by the Cincinnati Reds in the 7th round, with the 204th overall selection, of the 2019 Major League Baseball draft. He made his professional debut with the rookie–level Billings Mustangs, hitting .290 with four home runs and 29 RBI over 51 games. Yang did not play in a game in 2020 due to the cancellation of the minor league season because of the COVID-19 pandemic.

Yang returned to action in 2021 with the High–A Dayton Dragons, hitting .203/.346/.300 with three home runs and 19 RBI across 76 appearances. He split the 2022 campaign between the Double–A Chattanooga Lookouts and Triple–A Louisville Bats. In 48 games for the two affiliates, Yang batted an aggregate .205/.298/.298 with two home runs and 20 RBI.

Yang spent 2023 back with Chattanooga and Louisville, appearing in 41 total games and slashing a combined .219/.321/.294 with one home run and nine RBI. Yang began the 2024 campaign with Chattanooga, and was later promoted to Louisville, posting a .164/.330/.206 batting line with five RBI across 28 total appearances.

On July 29, 2024, Yang was selected to the 40-man roster and promoted to the major leagues for the first time following an injury to Austin Wynns. He made his MLB debut on July 31, and struck out in his only at–bat. On August 5, Yang was removed from the 40–man roster and sent outright to Louisville.

Yang made 34 appearances for Triple-A Louisville in 2025, batting .235/.333/.247 with 10 RBI. He elected free agency following the season on November 6, 2025.

=== Chicago Cubs ===
On February 4, 2026, Yang signed a minor league contract with the Chicago Cubs. He made 33 appearances for the Triple–A Iowa Cubs, slashing .222/.336/.293 with two home runs, and 12 RBI. Yang was released by the Cubs organization on July 14.

== Personal life ==
Yang was born to Kenny and Lisa Yang, and also has a younger sister named Lucy who played softball at the University of Pennsylvania.
