= Evan Kravetz =

American baseball player (born 1996)

Free agent
- Pitcher
- Born: December 19, 1996 (age 29); Miami, Florida, U.S.
- Bats: Left Throws: Left

MLB debut
- August 28, 2024, for the Cincinnati Reds

MLB statistics (through 2024 season)
- Win–loss record: 0–0
- Earned run average: 0.00
- Strikeouts: 0
- Stats at Baseball Reference

Teams
- Cincinnati Reds (2024)

Evan Jacob Kravetz (born December 19, 1996) is an American professional baseball pitcher who is a free agent. He played college baseball for the Rice Owls, and was selected by the Cincinnati Reds in the 5th round of the 2019 MLB draft. He made his Major League Baseball (MLB) debut in 2024 with the Reds. Kravetz played for Team Israel in the 2023 World Baseball Classic.

== Early life ==
Kravetz, born and raised in Miami, Florida, is the son of Jeffrey and Lisse Kravetz, has a sister, Rebecca, and is Jewish. While his father is 5' 11", and his mother is 5' 6", he is 6' 8".

For high school Kravetz attended and played baseball at Gulliver Prep ('15) in Pinecrest, Florida. Pitching for the school's baseball team in 2015, Kravetz was 4-1 with an 0.87 ERA in 40.1 innings as he held batters to a .181 batting average. He earned all-district honors, and was named first team all-Miami-Dade County by the Miami Herald.

Kravetz attended Rice University, where he played baseball for the Rice Owls. In his senior year, he was 4-1 with a 1.87 ERA, held opposing batters to a .200 batting average, and ranked 28th among NCAA statistical leaders with 12.05 strikeouts-per-9-innings.

== Professional career ==
=== 2019–20 ===
Kravetz was drafted by the Cincinnati Reds in the 5th round, with the 144th overall selection, of the 2019 Major League Baseball draft, and signed for a signing bonus of $112,500. That year he made his professional debut with the rookie–level Greeneville Reds. Kravetz did not play in a game in 2020 due to the cancellation of the minor league season because of the COVID-19 pandemic.

=== 2021–23 ===
In 2021, he played for the rookie–level Arizona Complex League Reds, Single–A Daytona Tortugas, and High–A Dayton Dragons. In aggregate he was 0-2 with a 3.49 ERA as in 17 games (13 starts), as he pitched 56 2/3 innings and struck out 82 batters (13.0 strikeouts per 9 innings).

In 2022, Kravetz pitched for Dayton and the Double–A Chattanooga Lookouts. He was 4-5 with 3 saves and a 4.20 ERA as in 28 games (8 starts) he pitched 83 2/3 innings and struck out 103 batters (11.1 strikeouts per 9 innings).

Kravetz split the 2023 campaign between Chattanooga and the Triple–A Louisville Bats, accumulating a 3–1 record with one save and a 4.60 ERA in 36 games (2 starts). He had 67 strikeouts over 60 2/3 innings pitched (9.9 strikeouts per 9 innings).

=== 2024–25 ===
Kravetz pitched for the Reds in spring training in 2024. He began the 2024 campaign with Triple–A Louisville, posting a 5–3 record and 3.40 ERA with 47 strikeouts in 42.1 innings (10.0 strikeouts per 9 innings) across 41 appearances. On August 28, 2024, Kravetz was selected to the 40-man roster and promoted to the major leagues for the first time. That day, he made his MLB debut for the Reds, tossing 2/3 of a scoreless inning against the Oakland Athletics. Kravetz was designated for assignment by Cincinnati on August 31. He cleared waivers and was sent outright to Louisville on September 2. Pitching for Louisville, for the 2024 season he was 6-4 with two saves and a 3.67 ERA, as in 48 relief appearances he pitched 49 innings in which he had 53 strikeouts (9.7 strikeouts per 9 innings).

Kravetz made 19 appearances for Louisville in 2025, recording a 5.59 ERA with 21 strikeouts across 19 1/3 innings pitched. He elected free agency following the season on November 6, 2025.

== International career ==
In March 2023 he played for Team Israel in the 2023 World Baseball Classic.

== See also ==
- List of Jewish Major League Baseball players
