= Julian Aguiar =

American baseball player (born 2001)

Chicago Cubs
- Pitcher
- Born: June 4, 2001 (age 25); Long Beach, California, U.S.
- Bats: Left Throws: Right

MLB debut
- August 19, 2024, for the Cincinnati Reds

MLB statistics (through September 18, 2026)
- Win–loss record: 3–1
- Earned run average: 6.23
- Strikeouts: 21
- Stats at Baseball Reference

Teams
- Cincinnati Reds (2024, 2026)

Julian Aguiar (born June 4, 2001) is an American professional baseball pitcher for the Chicago Cubs of Major League Baseball (MLB). He has previously played in MLB for the Cincinnati Reds.

== Career ==
Aguiar attended Millikan High School in Long Beach, California and played college baseball at Cypress College.

=== Cincinnati Reds ===
Aguiar was drafted by the Cincinnati Reds in the 12th round, with the 360th overall selection, of the 2021 Major League Baseball draft. He made his professional debut with the rookie–level Arizona Complex League Reds.

Aguiar started 2022 with the Single–A Daytona Tortugas before being promoted to the High–A Dayton Dragons. He made 25 total appearances (17 starts), registering a 7–8 record and 3.46 ERA with 113 strikeouts over 96 1/3 innings of work. Aguiar started 2023 with Dayton and was promoted to the Double–A Chattanooga Lookouts during the season. In 25 starts split between the two affiliates, he compiled an 8–5 record and 2.95 ERA with 138 strikeouts across 125 innings.

Aguiar began the 2024 campaign with Chattanooga, logging a 3.38 ERA over 13 starts. In June, he was promoted to the Triple–A Louisville Bats, where he recorded a 4.40 ERA with 41 strikeouts across nine starts. On August 19, 2024, Aguiar was selected to the 40-man roster and promoted to the major leagues for the first time. In seven starts for Cincinnati during his rookie campaign, he logged a 2–1 record and 6.25 ERA with 19 strikeouts across 31 2/3 innings pitched. On October 12, Aguiar underwent Tommy John surgery, ruling him out for the entirety of the 2025 season.

Aguiar was optioned to Triple-A Louisville to begin the 2026 season. He appeared in only one game for Cincinnati during the regular season, recording the win after tossing three innings of relief against the Chicago Cubs on September 18.

=== Chicago Cubs ===
On September 26, 2026, Aguiar was claimed off of waivers by the Chicago Cubs.
