= Brett Kennedy =

American baseball player (born 1994)

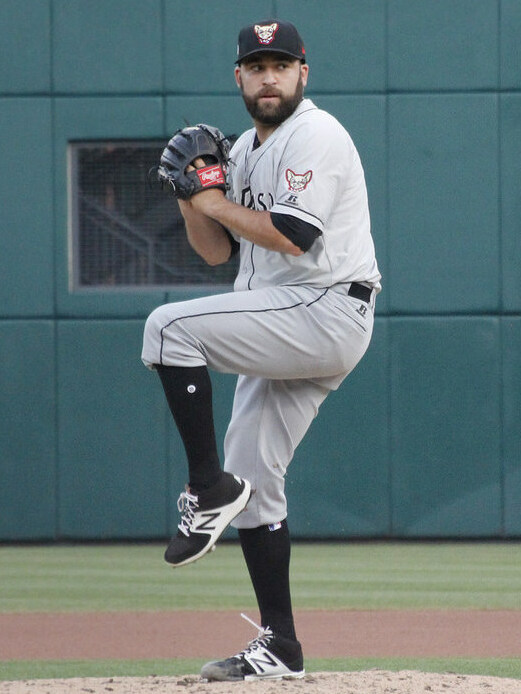
- Kennedy with the El Paso Chihuahuas in 2018
- Pitcher
- Born: August 4, 1994 (age 31); Pomona, New Jersey, U.S.
- Batted: Right Threw: Right

MLB debut
- August 8, 2018, for the San Diego Padres

Last MLB appearance
- September 3, 2023, for the Cincinnati Reds

MLB statistics
- Win–loss record: 2–2
- Earned run average: 6.65
- Strikeouts: 27
- Stats at Baseball Reference

Teams
- San Diego Padres (2018); Cincinnati Reds (2023)

Brett Kennedy (born August 4, 1994) is an American former professional baseball pitcher. He played in Major League Baseball (MLB) for the San Diego Padres and Cincinnati Reds.

== Early life and college ==
Kennedy grew up in Brigantine, New Jersey and attended Atlantic City High School in Atlantic City, New Jersey. In 2011, as a junior, he went 3–2 with a 2.10 ERA and sixty strikeouts over 44 1/3 innings. pitched. After graduating, he enrolled at Fordham University (the only Division I school to offer him a scholarship) where he played college baseball for the Fordham Rams. In 2015, his junior year, he compiled a 6–8 record with a 4.14 ERA, striking out 97 and walking only twenty over 87 innings. Over the course of his collegiate career, Kennedy posted a 15–17 record with 3.73 ERA and 218 strikeouts (tied for second-most in school history) in fifty appearances (thirty starts).

== Professional career ==
=== San Diego Padres ===
Kennedy was drafted by the San Diego Padres in the 11th round (327th overall) of the 2015 Major League Baseball draft. He signed and made his professional debut that same year with the Tri-City Dust Devils, going 0–2 with a 2.70 ERA in 12 games (nine starts).

In 2016, he pitched for both the Fort Wayne TinCaps and Lake Elsinore Storm, compiling an 8–11 record with a 3.55 ERA in 28 total starts between both teams, and in 2017, he played with the San Antonio Missions where he pitched to a 13–7 record and 3.70 ERA over 26 starts, earning Texas League All-Star honors. He began 2018 with the El Paso Chihuahuas and was named to the Pacific Coast League All-Star team. In 16 starts for El Paso, he posted a 10–0 record with a 2.72 ERA.

Kennedy made his Major League debut on August 8, 2018, earning the loss after allowing six runs over four innings to the Milwaukee Brewers. Kennedy recorded his first career win on September 1, 2018, pitching six scoreless innings against the Colorado Rockies. In his first Major League season, Kennedy went 1–2 in six starts with a 6.75 ERA and 18 strikeouts before a knee injury ended his season.

Kennedy experienced a lat strain in spring training in 2019 and pitched just one minor league inning that season due to injury. Kennedy was outrighted off the Padres roster on October 31. Kennedy did not play in a game in 2020 due to the cancellation of the minor league season because of the COVID-19 pandemic. To begin the 2021 season, he was assigned to El Paso. He was released by the Padres on September 12, 2021.

=== Long Island Ducks ===
On April 5, 2022, Kennedy signed with the Long Island Ducks of the Atlantic League of Professional Baseball. In six starts, he posted a 2–1 record with a 3.03 ERA and 27 strikeouts over 32 2/3 innings.

=== Boston Red Sox ===
On May 24, 2022, Kennedy's contract was purchased by the Boston Red Sox and he was assigned to the Double-A Portland Sea Dogs. In 25 appearances split between Portland and the Triple-A Worcester Red Sox, he compiled a 3–6 record and 3.87 ERA with 61 strikeouts and 5 saves across 76 2/3 innings pitched. Kennedy elected free agency following the season on November 10.

=== Long Island Ducks (second stint) ===
On April 7, 2023, Kennedy re-signed with the Long Island Ducks of the Atlantic League of Professional Baseball. Kennedy made 3 starts for the Ducks, recording a 3.09 ERA with 16 strikeouts in 11.2 innings pitched.

=== Cincinnati Reds ===
On May 13, 2023, Kennedy's contract was purchased by the Cincinnati Reds organization and he was assigned to the Triple-A Louisville Bats. In 8 starts for Louisville, he logged a 3.71 ERA with 37 strikeouts in 43 2/3 innings pitched. On July 4, Kennedy was selected to the major league roster. In 5 appearances for Cincinnati, he recorded a 6.50 ERA with 9 strikeouts in 18.0 innings of work. On October 9, Kennedy was removed from the 40–man roster and sent outright to Triple–A Louisville. The next day, he elected free agency.

On December 27, 2023, Kennedy re-signed with the Reds on a minor league contract. He would start the 2024 season with Triple-A Louisville, logging a 1–5 record and 6.86 ERA across 8 starts. On May 23, 2024, Kennedy was selected to the major league roster. He did not make an appearance for Cincinnati before he was designated for assignment on May 28. Kennedy cleared waivers and was sent outright to Louisville on May 30. He elected free agency on October 7.

== Coaching career ==
In 2025, Kennedy was named as the assistant pitching coach of the Florida Complex League Blue Jays, the rookie-level affiliate of the Toronto Blue Jays. In 2026, Kennedy was named as pitching coach of the Dunedin Blue Jays the Single-A affiliate of the Toronto Blue Jays.
