= Levi Stoudt =

American baseball player (born 1997)

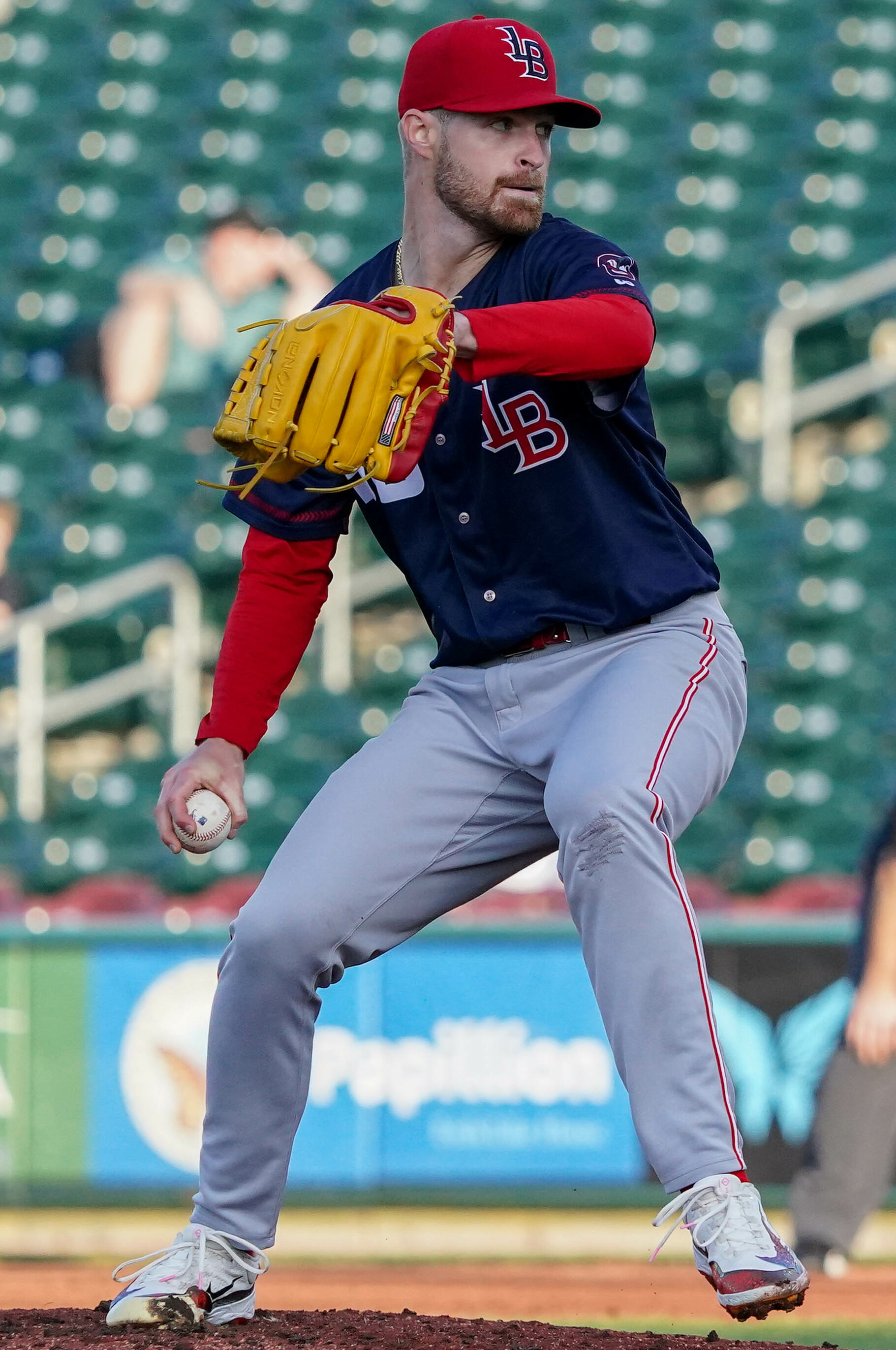
- Stoudt with the Louisville Bats in 2023

Tampa Bay Rays
- Pitcher
- Born: December 4, 1997 (age 28); Pottstown, Pennsylvania, U.S.
- Bats: Right Throws: Right

MLB debut
- April 19, 2023, for the Cincinnati Reds

MLB statistics (through 2023 season)
- Win–loss record: 0–1
- Earned run average: 9.58
- Strikeouts: 9
- Stats at Baseball Reference

Teams
- Cincinnati Reds (2023)

Levi Stoudt (born December 4, 1997) is an American professional baseball pitcher in the Tampa Bay Rays organization. He has previously played in Major League Baseball (MLB) for the Cincinnati Reds, with whom he made his debut in 2023.

== Amateur career ==
Stoudt attended Perkiomen School in Pennsburg, Pennsylvania, and played college baseball at Lehigh University. In 2018, he played collegiate summer baseball with the Orleans Firebirds of the Cape Cod Baseball League.

== Professional career ==
=== Seattle Mariners ===
Stoudt was drafted by the Seattle Mariners in the third round, with the 97th overall selection, of the 2019 Major League Baseball draft. Stoudt underwent Tommy John surgery after the Mariners drafted him.

He made his professional debut two years later in 2021 with the Everett AquaSox and was promoted to the Arkansas Travelers during the season. Over 15 starts between the two teams, he went 7–3 with a 3.31 ERA and 86 strikeouts over 81 2/3 innings.

=== Cincinnati Reds ===
On July 29, 2022, the Mariners traded Stoudt, Edwin Arroyo, Andrew Moore, and Noelvi Marte to the Cincinnati Reds for Luis Castillo. He played for the Chattanooga Lookouts after the trade. On November 15, 2022, the Reds added Stoudt to their 40-man roster to protect him from the Rule 5 draft.

Stoudt began the 2023 season with the Louisville Bats. On April 18, the Reds announced that Stoudt would be promoted to the major leagues for the first time to start a game against the Tampa Bay Rays the following day. In 4 games (2 starts) for the Reds, he posted a 9.58 ERA with 9 strikeouts across 10 1/3 innings of work. On February 13, 2024, Stoudt was designated for assignment by the Reds following the waiver claim of Bubba Thompson.

=== Seattle Mariners (second stint) ===
On February 17, 2024, Stoudt was claimed off waivers by the Mariners. He was optioned to the Triple–A Tacoma Rainiers to begin the 2024 season. In 12 games (11 starts), Stoudt registered a 3–4 record and 6.92 ERA with 36 strikeouts across 52 innings pitched. On June 9, Stoudt was designated for assignment by Seattle.

=== Baltimore Orioles ===
On June 13, 2024, Stoudt was claimed off waivers by the Baltimore Orioles. Stoudt was designated for assignment by the Orioles on July 26. He cleared waivers and was sent outright to the Double-A Bowie Baysox on July 31. Stoudt made 14 appearances for Bowie down the stretch, and also appeared in eight games for the Triple-A Norfolk Tides.

Stoudt made 21 appearances split between Norfolk and the High-A Aberdeen IronBirds in 2025, struggling to a 1-4 record and 6.14 ERA with 21 strikeouts across 29 1/3 innings pitched. Stoudt was released by the Orioles organization on August 4, 2025.

=== Philadelphia Phillies ===
On December 23, 2025, Stoudt signed a minor league contract with the Philadelphia Phillies. In 17 games (2 starts) between Triple-A and Double-A he threw 22.2 innings going 1-1 with a 0.00 ERA and 23 strikeouts. He elected free agency on November 2.

=== Tampa Bay Rays ===
On November 5, 2026, Stoudt signed a minor league contract with the Tampa Bay Rays.
