= Levi Jordan =

American baseball player (born 1995)

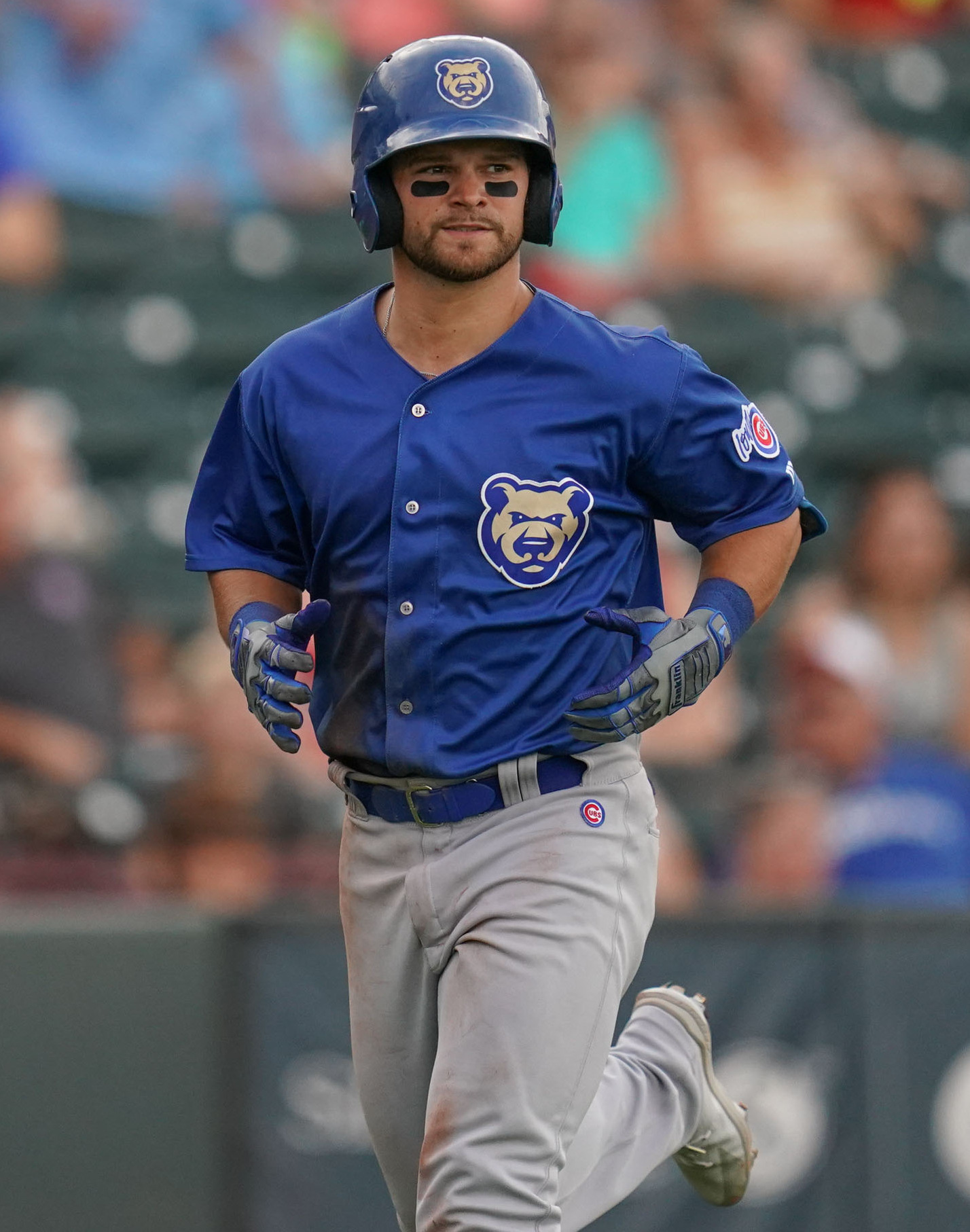
- Jordan with the Iowa Cubs in 2022

Free agent
- Infielder / Outfielder
- Born: September 24, 1995 (age 31); Puyallup, Washington, U.S.
- Bats: Right Throws: Right

MLB debut
- June 24, 2024, for the Cincinnati Reds

MLB statistics (through 2024 season)
- Batting average: .100
- Home runs: 0
- Runs batted in: 1
- Stats at Baseball Reference

Teams
- Cincinnati Reds (2024)

Levi David Jordan (born September 24, 1995) is an American professional baseball utility player who is a free agent. He has previously played in Major League Baseball (MLB) for the Cincinnati Reds.

== Career ==
Jordan attended Puyallup High School in Puyallup, Washington, playing for the school's baseball team. In 2014, his senior year, The News Tribune named him their male high school senior athlete of the year. Puyallup won the 4A state championship in baseball. Jordan then played college baseball for the Washington Huskies, playing as a walk-on for four years. He was named to the All Pac-12 team in 2018.

=== Chicago Cubs ===
The Chicago Cubs drafted Jordan in the 29th round, with the 878th overall selection, of the 2018 Major League Baseball draft. He spent his first professional season with the rookie-level Arizona League Cubs and Low-A Eugene Emeralds. In 2019, Jordan played for the Single-A South Bend Cubs, hitting .221/.289/.286 with one home run and 16 RBI over 66 games.

Jordan did not play in a game in 2020 due to the cancellation of the minor league season because of the COVID-19 pandemic. He returned to action in 2021 with the rookie-level Arizona Complex League Cubs, Double-A Tennessee Smokies, and Triple-A Iowa Cubs. In 78 games split among the three affiliates, Jordan slashed a cumulative .253/.331/.401 with eight home runs and 40 RBI.

Jordan split the 2022 campaign between Tennessee and Iowa, hitting .274/.341/.455 with career-highs in home runs (13), RBI (49), and stolen bases (10) over 105 total appearances. He once more returned to Tennessee and Iowa in 2023. In 67 total games, Jordan batted .219/.351/.308 with two home runs, 28 RBI, and 14 stolen bases.

=== Cincinnati Reds ===
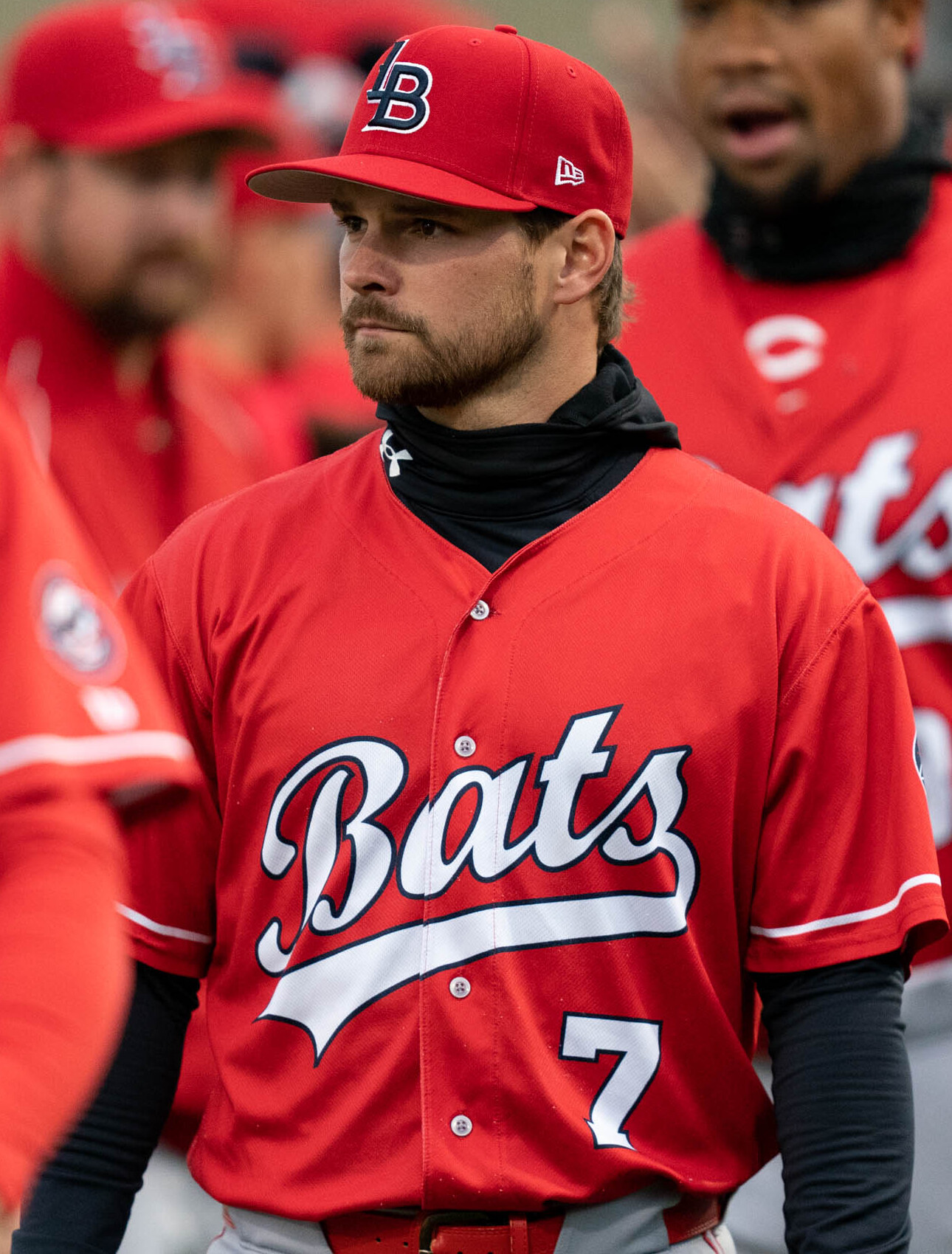
Jordan with the Louisville Bats in 2025

On December 6, 2023, the Cincinnati Reds selected Jordan in the minor league phase of the Rule 5 draft. The Reds assigned him to the Louisville Bats of the Triple-A International League to begin the 2024 season. On June 24, 2024, Jordan was selected to the 40-man roster and promoted to the major leagues for the first time. He made his MLB debut that night, hitting a double and sacrifice fly. In six more games for Cincinnati, he went hitless in seven plate appearances. On July 5, Jordan was designated for assignment by the Reds. He cleared waivers and was sent outright to Louisville on July 8. Jordan elected free agency following the season on November 4.

On January 9, 2025, Jordan re-signed with the Reds on a minor league contract. He returned to Louisville to start the season, playing in 122 games and hitting .237/.307/.345 with seven home runs, 30 RBI, and 17 stolen bases. On September 21, in an 11–4 loss to the Nashville Sounds, Jordan played all nine positions during the game. Jordan elected free agency following the season on November 6.

=== Washington Nationals ===
On January 22, 2026, Jordan signed a minor league contract with the Washington Nationals. In 9 games with Triple-A Rochester Red Wings he batted .250/.300/.286 with no home runs, 1 RBI and 1 stolen base. He elected free agency on November 2.

== See also ==
- Rule 5 draft results
