= Yosver Zulueta =

Cuban baseball player (born 1998)

Free agent
- Pitcher
- Born: January 23, 1998 (age 28); Remedios, Cuba
- Bats: Right Throws: Right

MLB debut
- June 25, 2024, for the Cincinnati Reds

MLB statistics (through 2025 season)
- Win–loss record: 1–0
- Earned run average: 5.32
- Strikeouts: 25
- Stats at Baseball Reference

Teams
- Cincinnati Reds (2024–2025)

Yosver José Zulueta (born January 23, 1998) is a Cuban professional baseball pitcher who is a free agent. He has previously played in Major League Baseball (MLB) for the Cincinnati Reds.

== Career ==
=== Toronto Blue Jays ===
Zulueta signed with the Toronto Blue Jays as an international free agent on June 11, 2019. He spent 2020 recovering from Tommy John surgery, though the season was cancelled due to the COVID-19 pandemic.

Zulueta made his professional debut in 2021 with the Low-A Dunedin Blue Jays but pitched in only one game due to a torn ACL. He returned from the injury to start 2022 with Dunedin before being promoted to the High-A Vancouver Canadians, and later played with the Double-A New Hampshire Fisher Cats and Triple-A Buffalo Bisons. In 21 total appearances, Zulueta pitched to a 2–5 win–loss record, 3.72 earned run average (ERA), and 84 strikeouts in 55 2/3 innings pitched.

On November 15, 2022, the Blue Jays added Zulueta to their 40-man roster to protect him from the Rule 5 draft. Zulueta was optioned to Triple-A Buffalo to begin the 2023 season. In 45 games for the club, he registered a 4–4 record and 4.08 ERA with 73 strikeouts across 64.0 innings pitched. Zulueta was again optioned to Triple–A Buffalo to begin the 2024 season. However, on March 28, 2024, he was designated for assignment by Toronto.

=== Cincinnati Reds ===
On March 28, 2024, Zulueta was claimed off waivers by the Cincinnati Reds and subsequently optioned to the Triple–A Louisville Bats. He was promoted to the major leagues for the first time on June 25. In 12 appearances during his rookie campaign, Zulueta recorded a 4.96 ERA with 20 strikeouts across 16 1/3 innings pitched.

Zulueta was optioned to Triple-A Louisville to begin the 2025 season. On September 1, 2025, Zulueta earned his first career win after tossing a scoreless 2/3 of an inning against the Toronto Blue Jays. In seven appearances for Cincinnati, he struggled to a 6.14 ERA with five strikeouts across 7 1/3 innings pitched. On January 15, 2026, Zulueta was designated for assignment by the Reds.

=== Seattle Mariners ===
On January 15, 2026, Zulueta was traded to the Seattle Mariners in exchange for Dusty Revis. He was optioned to the Triple-A Tacoma Rainiers to begin the regular season. In 22 appearances for Tacoma, Zulueta compiled a 2–3 record and 5.75 ERA with 21 strikeouts across 20 1/3 innings pitched. On June 10, Zulueta was designated for assignment by the Mariners.

=== Chicago Cubs ===
On June 15, 2026, Zulueta was traded to the Chicago Cubs in exchange for cash considerations. He made two appearances for the Triple-A Iowa Cubs, allowing six runs on three hits over 2 1/3 innings pitched. Zulueta was designated for assignment by Chicago following the acquisition of David Peterson on June 25.

=== Baltimore Orioles ===
On June 28, 2026, Zulueta was claimed off of waivers by the Baltimore Orioles. He made 20 appearances for the Triple–A Norfolk Tides, posting an 0–1 record and 3.74 ERA with 24 strikeouts across 21 2/3 innings pitched. On November 2, Zulueta was removed from the 40–man roster and sent outright to Norfolk. He elected free agency on November 2.
