= Cincinnati Reds =

Major League Baseball franchise in Cincinnati, Ohio

- 2026 Cincinnati Reds season

Logo	Cap insignia
- Established in 1881

Major league affiliations
- National League (1890–present); Central Division (1994–present); West Division (1969–1993); American Association (1882–1889)

Current uniform
- Retired numbers: 1; 5; 8; 10; 11; 13; 14; 18; 20; 24; 42

Colors
- Red, black, white

Name
- Cincinnati Reds (1959–present); Cincinnati Redlegs (1953–1958); Cincinnati Reds (1887–1952); Cincinnati Red Stockings (1881–1886)

Nicknames
- Big Red Machine

Ballpark
- Great American Ball Park (2003–present); Riverfront Stadium (1970–2002); Crosley Field (1912–1970); Palace of the Fans (1902–1911); League Park (II) (1894–1901); League Park (I) (1884–1893); Bank Street Grounds (1881–1883)

Major league titles
- World Series titles (5): 1919; 1940; 1975; 1976; 1990
- NL pennants (9): 1919; 1939; 1940; 1961; 1970; 1972; 1975; 1976; 1990
- AA pennants (1): 1882
- NL Central division titles (3): 1995; 2010; 2012
- NL West division titles (7): 1970; 1972; 1973; 1975; 1976; 1979; 1990
- Wild card berths (3): 2013; 2020; 2025

Front office
- Principal owner: Bob Castellini
- President: Phillip J. Castellini
- President of baseball operations: Nick Krall
- General manager: Brad Meador
- Manager: Terry Francona
- Website: mlb.com/reds

The Cincinnati Reds are an American professional baseball team based in Cincinnati. The Reds compete in Major League Baseball (MLB) as a member club of the National League (NL) Central Division. They were a charter member of the American Association in 1882 before joining the NL in 1890.

The Reds played in the NL West division from 1969 to 1993, before joining the Central division in 1994. Cincinnati is generally considered to be the most dominant team of the 1970s. During this decade, they won the National League pennant five times, ultimately winning the World Series twice, in 1975 and 1976. The team was colloquially known as the "Big Red Machine" during this time, and it included Hall of Fame members Johnny Bench, Joe Morgan, and Tony Pérez, as well as the controversial Pete Rose, the all-time hits leader in Major League Baseball. Despite their decorated past, the Reds have struggled in recent years, and currently have the longest drought of not winning a playoff series of any MLB team, with their last win coming in 1995. Overall, the Reds have won five World Series championships, nine NL pennants, one AA pennant and 10 division titles. The team plays its home games at Great American Ball Park, which opened in 2003. Bob Castellini has been the CEO of the Reds since 2006. From 1882 to 2025, the Reds' overall win–loss record is 11,017–10,845–139 (a .504 winning percentage).

== History ==
=== The birth of the Reds and the American Association (1881–1889) ===
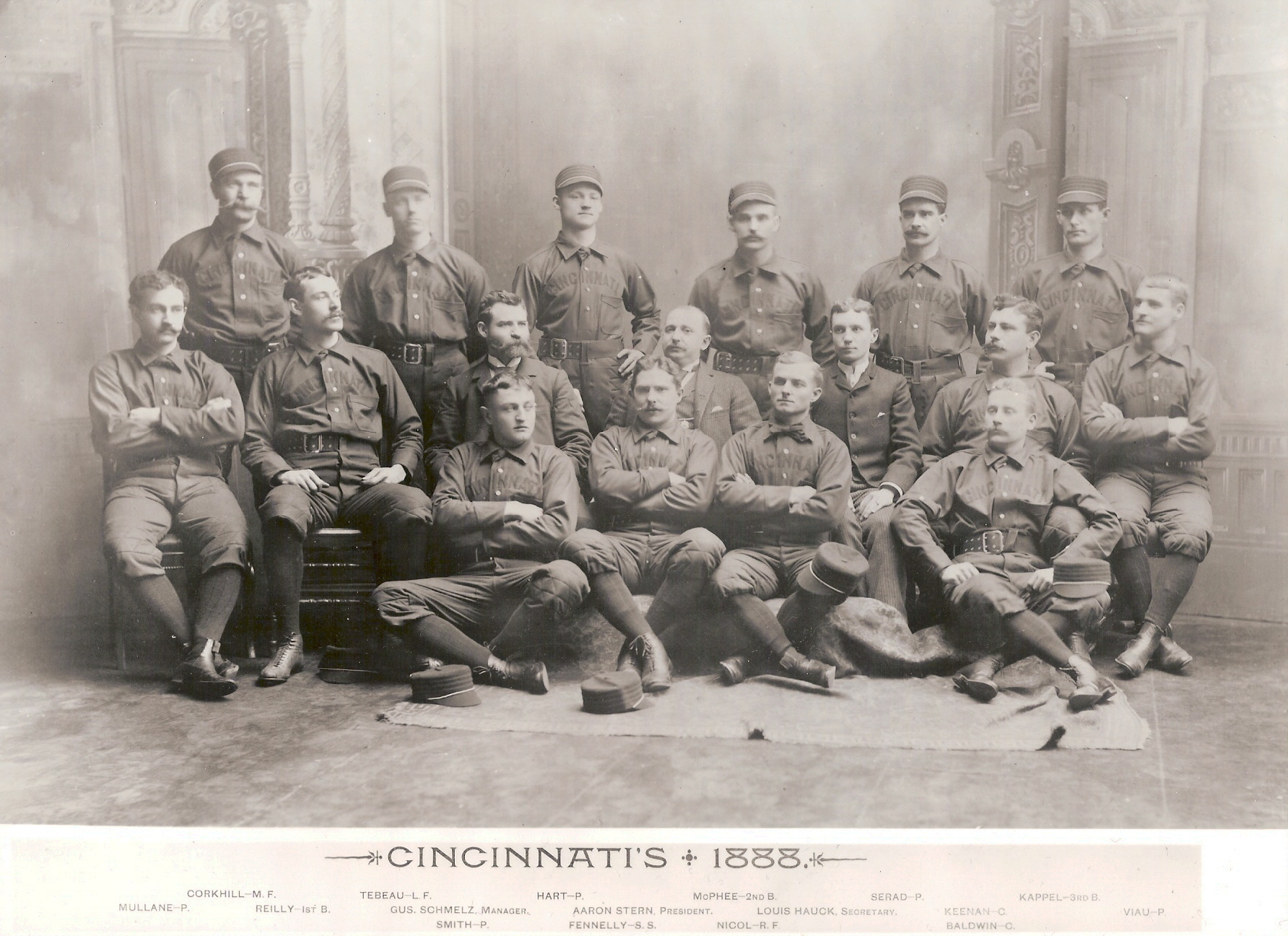
The 1888 Cincinnati Reds

The origins of the modern Cincinnati Reds baseball team can be traced back to the expulsion from the National League of an earlier team bearing the same name. In 1876, Cincinnati became one of the charter members of the new National League (NL), but the club ran afoul of league organizer and longtime president William Hulbert for selling beer during games and renting out its ballpark on Sundays. Both were important in enticing the city's large German population to support the team. While Hulbert made clear his distaste for both beer and Sunday baseball at the founding of the league, neither practice was against league rules at the time. On October 6, 1880, however, seven of the eight team owners adopted a pledge to ban both beer and Sunday baseball at the regular league meeting in December. Only Cincinnati president W. H. Kennett refused to sign the pledge, so the other owners preemptively expelled Cincinnati from the league for violating the new rules even though they were not yet in effect.

Cincinnati's expulsion incensed Cincinnati Enquirer sports editor O. P. Caylor, who made two attempts to form a new league on behalf of the receivers for the now-bankrupt Reds franchise. When these attempts failed, he formed a new independent ball club in the spring of 1881 and brought the team to St. Louis for a weekend exhibition. The Reds' first game was a 12–3 victory over the St. Louis club. After the 1881 series proved successful, Caylor and former Reds president Justus Thorner received an invitation from Philadelphia businessman Horace Phillips to attend a meeting of several clubs in Pittsburgh, planning to establish a new league to compete with the NL. Upon arriving, however, Caylor and Thorner found that no other owners had accepted the invitation, while even Phillips declined to attend his own meeting. By chance, the duo met former pitcher Al Pratt, who paired them with former Pittsburgh Alleghenys president H. Denny McKnight. Together, the three hatched a scheme to form a new league by sending a telegram to each of the owners who were invited to attend the meeting stating that he was the only person who did not attend, and that everyone else was enthusiastic about the new venture and eager to attend a second meeting in Cincinnati. The ploy worked, and the American Association (AA) was officially formed at the Hotel Gibson in Cincinnati. The new Reds – with Thorner now serving as president – became a charter member of the AA.

Led by the hitting of third baseman Hick Carpenter, the defense of future Hall of Fame second baseman Bid McPhee and the pitching of 40-game-winner Will White, Cincinnati won the inaugural AA pennant in 1882. With the establishment of the Union Association in 1884, Thorner left the club to finance the Cincinnati Outlaw Reds and managed to acquire the lease on the Reds' Bank Street Grounds playing field, forcing new president Aaron Stern to relocate three blocks away to the hastily built League Park. The club never placed higher than second or lower than fifth for the rest of its tenure in the American Association.

=== The National League returns to Cincinnati (1890–1911) ===
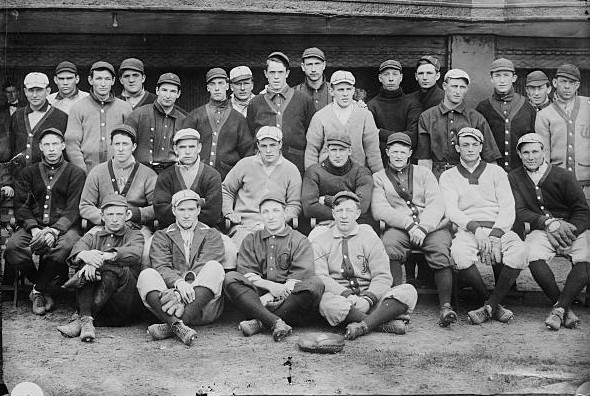
Cincinnati Reds baseball team in 1909

The Cincinnati Reds left the American Association on November 14, 1889, and joined the National League along with the Brooklyn Bridegrooms after a dispute with St. Louis Browns owner Chris von der Ahe over the selection of a new league president. The National League was happy to accept the teams in part due to the emergence of the new Player's League, an early failed attempt to break the reserve clause in baseball that threatened both existing leagues. Because the National League decided to expand while the American Association was weakening, the team accepted an invitation to join the National League. After shortening their name to the Reds, the team wandered through the 1890s, signing local stars and aging veterans. During this time, the team never finished above third place (1897) and never closer than 10 1/2 games to first (1890).

At the start of the 20th century, the Reds had hitting stars Sam Crawford and Cy Seymour. Seymour's .377 average in 1905 was the first individual batting crown won by a Red. In 1911, Bob Bescher stole 81 bases, which is still a team record. Like the previous decade, the 1900s were not kind to the Reds, as much of the decade was spent in the league's second division.

=== Redland Field to the Great Depression (1912–1932) ===
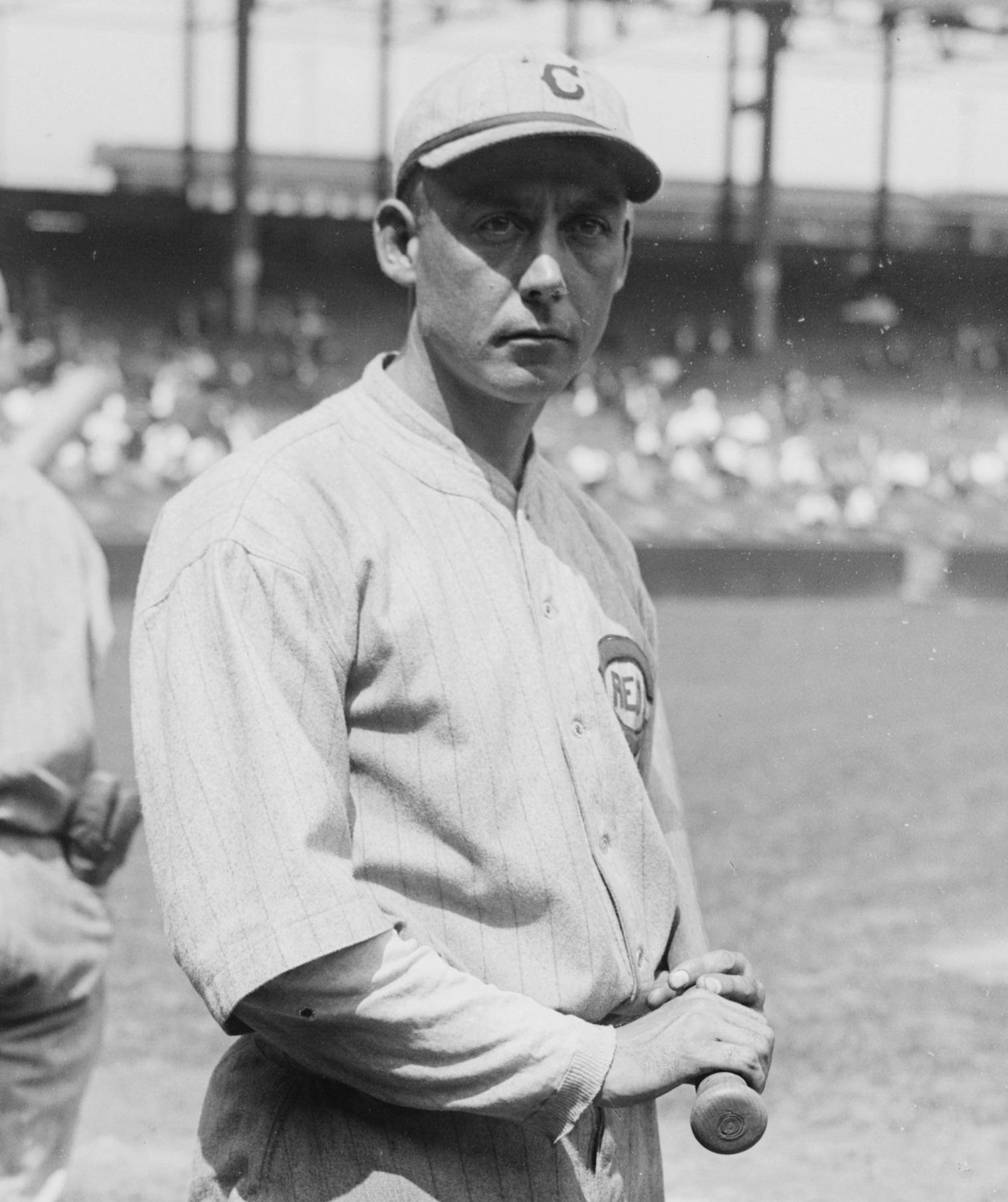
Hall of famer Edd Roush led Cincinnati to the 1919 World Series.

In 1912, the club opened Redland Field (renamed Crosley Field in 1934), a new steel-and-concrete ballpark. The Reds had been playing baseball on that same site – the corner of Findlay and Western Avenues on the city's west side — for 28 years in wooden structures that had been occasionally damaged by fires. By the late 1910s, the Reds began to come out of the second division. The 1918 team finished fourth, and new manager Pat Moran led the Reds to an NL pennant in 1919, in what the club advertised as its "Golden Anniversary." The 1919 team had hitting stars Edd Roush and Heinie Groh, while the pitching staff was led by Hod Eller and left-hander Harry "Slim" Sallee. The Reds finished ahead of John McGraw's New York Giants and then won the World Series in eight games over the Chicago White Sox.

By 1920, the "Black Sox" scandal had brought a taint to the Reds' first championship. After 1926 and well into the 1930s, the Reds were second division dwellers. Eppa Rixey, Dolf Luque and Pete Donohue were pitching stars, but the offense never lived up to the pitching. By 1931, the team was bankrupt, the Great Depression was in full swing and Redland Field was in a state of disrepair.

=== Championship baseball and revival (1933–1940) ===
Powel Crosley, Jr., an electronics magnate who, with his brother Lewis M. Crosley, produced radios, refrigerators and other household items, bought the Reds out of bankruptcy in 1933 and hired Larry MacPhail to be the general manager. Crosley had started WLW radio, the Reds flagship radio broadcaster, and the Crosley Broadcasting Corporation in Cincinnati, where he was also a prominent civic leader. MacPhail began to develop the Reds' minor league system and expanded the Reds' fan base. Throughout the rest of the decade, the Reds became a team of "firsts." The now-renamed Crosley Field became the host of the first night game in 1935, which was also the first baseball fireworks night. (The fireworks at the game were shot by Joe Rozzi of Rozzi's Famous Fireworks.) Johnny Vander Meer became the only pitcher in major league history to throw back-to-back no-hitters in 1938. Thanks to Vander Meer, Paul Derringer and second baseman/third baseman-turned-pitcher Bucky Walters, the Reds had a solid pitching staff. The offense came around in the late 1930s. By 1938, the Reds, led by manager Bill McKechnie, were out of the second division, finishing fourth. Ernie Lombardi was named the National League's Most Valuable Player in 1938. By 1939, the Reds were National League champions but were swept in the World Series by the New York Yankees. In 1940, the Reds repeated as NL Champions, and for the first time in 21 years, they captured a world championship, beating the Detroit Tigers four games to three. Frank McCormick was the 1940 NL MVP; other position players included Harry Craft, Lonny Frey, Ival Goodman, Lew Riggs and Bill Werber.

=== 1941–1969 ===
World War II and age finally caught up with the Reds, as the team finished mostly in the second division throughout the 1940s and early 1950s. In 1944, Joe Nuxhall (who was later to become part of the radio broadcasting team), at age 15, pitched for the Reds on loan from Wilson Junior High school in Hamilton, Ohio. He became the youngest player ever to appear in a major league game, a record that still stands today. Ewell "The Whip" Blackwell was the main pitching stalwart before arm problems cut short his career. Ted Kluszewski was the NL home run leader in 1954. The rest of the offense was a collection of over-the-hill players and not-ready-for-prime-time youngsters.

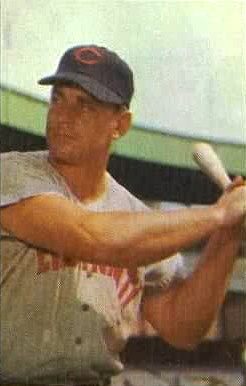
Ted Kluszewski (1953)

In April 1953, in a political climate increasingly dominated by McCarthyism, the Reds announced a preference to be called the "Redlegs". Saying that the name of the club had been "Red Stockings" and then "Redlegs", the team hoped to avoid any association between the team and the political connotation of the word "red" to mean communism, but as the New York Times reported, "The political significance of the word 'Reds' these days and its effect on the change was not discussed by management". From 1956 to 1960, the club's logo was altered to remove the term "REDS" from the inside of the "wishbone C" symbol. The team reverted to the name "Reds" for the 1959 season, when McCarthyism ended. The word "REDS" reappeared on the 1961 uniforms, but the point of the "C" was removed. The traditional home uniform logo was reinstated in 1967.

In 1956, the Redlegs, led by National League Rookie of the Year Frank Robinson, hit 221 home runs to tie the NL record. By 1961, Robinson was joined by Vada Pinson, Wally Post, Gordy Coleman and Gene Freese. Pitchers Joey Jay, Jim O'Toole and Bob Purkey led the staff.

The Reds captured the 1961 National League pennant, holding off the Los Angeles Dodgers and San Francisco Giants, only to be defeated by the perennially powerful New York Yankees in the World Series.

The Reds had winning teams during the rest of the 1960s, but did not produce any championships. They won 98 games in 1962, paced by Purkey's 23 wins, but finished third. In 1964, they lost the pennant by one game to the St. Louis Cardinals after having taken first place when the Philadelphia Phillies collapsed in September. Their beloved manager Fred Hutchinson died of cancer just weeks after the end of the 1964 season. The failure of the Reds to win the 1964 pennant led to owner Bill DeWitt selling off key components of the team in anticipation of relocating the franchise. In response to DeWitt's threatened move, women of Cincinnati banded together to form the Rosie Reds to urge DeWitt to keep the franchise in Cincinnati. The Rosie Reds are still in existence, and are currently the oldest fan club in Major League Baseball and inspired the “Rosie” mascot for the reds. After the 1965 season, DeWitt executed what is remembered as the most lopsided trade in baseball history, sending former MVP Frank Robinson to the Baltimore Orioles for pitchers Milt Pappas and Jack Baldschun, and outfielder Dick Simpson. Robinson went on to win the MVP and Triple Crown in the American League in 1966, and led Baltimore to its first-ever World Series title in a sweep of the Los Angeles Dodgers. The Reds did not recover from this trade until the rise of the "Big Red Machine" in the 1970s.

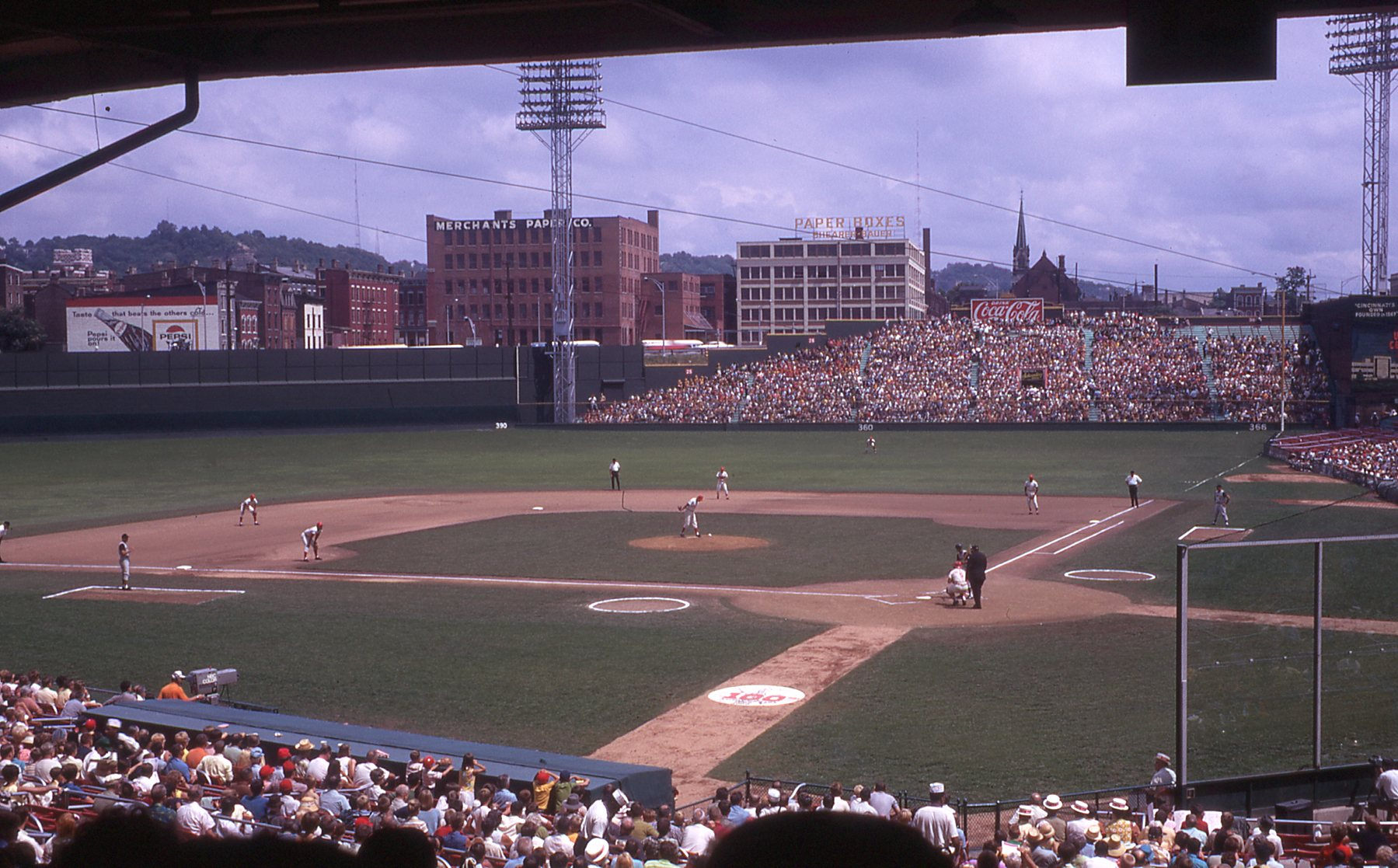
Crosley Field (pictured in 1969), the Reds' home stadium from 1912 to 1970

Starting in the early 1960s, the Reds' farm system began producing a series of stars, including Jim Maloney (the Reds' pitching ace of the 1960s), Pete Rose, Tony Pérez, Johnny Bench, Lee May, Tommy Helms, Bernie Carbo, Hal McRae, Dave Concepción and Gary Nolan. The tipping point came in 1967, with the appointment of Bob Howsam as general manager. That same year, the Reds avoided a move to San Diego when the city of Cincinnati and Hamilton County agreed to build a state-of-the-art, downtown stadium on the edge of the Ohio River. The Reds entered into a 30-year lease in exchange for the stadium commitment keeping the franchise in Cincinnati. In a series of strategic moves, Howsam brought in key personnel to complement the homegrown talent. The Reds' final game at Crosley Field, where they had played since 1912, was played on June 24, 1970, with a 5–4 victory over the San Francisco Giants.

Under Howsam's administration starting in the late 1960s, all players coming to the Reds were required to shave and cut their hair for the next three decades in order to present the team as wholesome in an era of turmoil. The rule was controversial, but persisted well into the ownership of Marge Schott, echoing the New York Yankees policy that persisted until February 2025. On at least one occasion, in the early 1980s, enforcement of this rule lost the Reds the services of star reliever and Ohio native Rollie Fingers, who would not shave his trademark handlebar mustache in order to join the team. The rule was not officially rescinded until 1999, when the Reds traded for slugger Greg Vaughn, who had a goatee. Much like when players would depart the Yankees, players who left the Reds took advantage with their new teams; Pete Rose, for instance, grew his hair out much longer than would be allowed by the Reds once he signed with the Philadelphia Phillies in 1979.

The Reds' rules also included conservative uniforms. In Major League Baseball, a club generally provides most of the equipment and clothing needed for play. However, players are required to supply their gloves and shoes themselves. Many players enter into sponsorship arrangements with shoe manufacturers, but until the mid-1980s, the Reds had a strict rule requiring players to wear only plain black shoes with no prominent logo. Reds players decried what they considered to be the boring color choice, as well as the denial of the opportunity to earn more money through shoe contracts. In 1985, a compromise was struck in which players could paint red marks on their black shoes and were allowed to wear all-red shoes the following year.

=== The Big Red Machine (1970–1976) ===
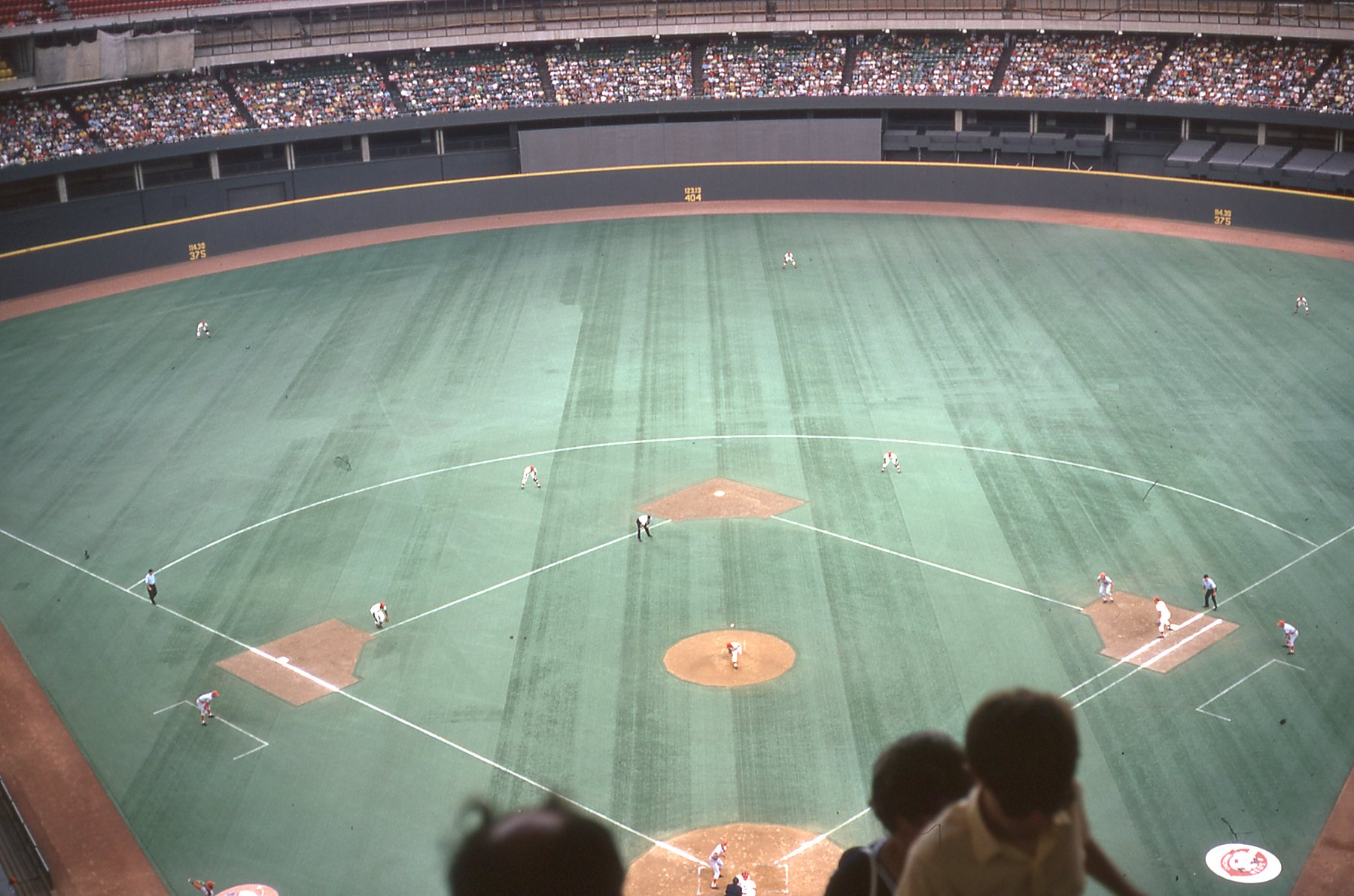
Riverfront Stadium (pictured in 1974), the home stadium of the Reds from 1970 to 2002

In 1970, little-known George "Sparky" Anderson was hired as manager of the Reds, and the team embarked upon a decade of excellence, with a lineup that came to be known as "the Big Red Machine." Playing at Crosley Field until June 30, 1970, when they moved into Riverfront Stadium, a new 52,000-seat multi-purpose venue on the shores of the Ohio River, the Reds began the 1970s with a bang by winning 70 of their first 100 games. Johnny Bench, Tony Pérez, Pete Rose, Lee May and Bobby Tolan were the early offensive leaders of this era. Gary Nolan, Jim Merritt, Wayne Simpson and Jim McGlothlin led a pitching staff that also included veterans Tony Cloninger and Clay Carroll, as well as youngsters Pedro Borbón and Don Gullett. The Reds breezed through the 1970 season, winning the NL West and capturing the NL pennant by sweeping the Pittsburgh Pirates in three games. By the time the club got to the World Series, however, the pitching staff had run out of gas, and the veteran Baltimore Orioles, led by Hall of Fame third baseman and World Series MVP Brooks Robinson, beat the Reds in five games.

After the disastrous 1971 season – the only year in the decade in which the team finished with a losing record – the Reds reloaded by trading veterans Jimmy Stewart, May and Tommy Helms to the Houston Astros for Joe Morgan, César Gerónimo, Jack Billingham, Ed Armbrister and Denis Menke. Meanwhile, Dave Concepción blossomed at shortstop. 1971 was also the year a key component of future world championships was acquired, when George Foster was traded to the Reds from the San Francisco Giants in exchange for shortstop Frank Duffy.

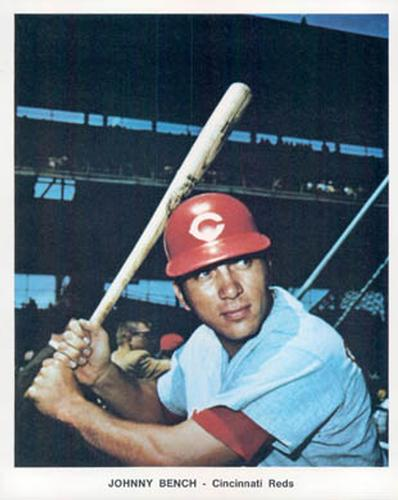
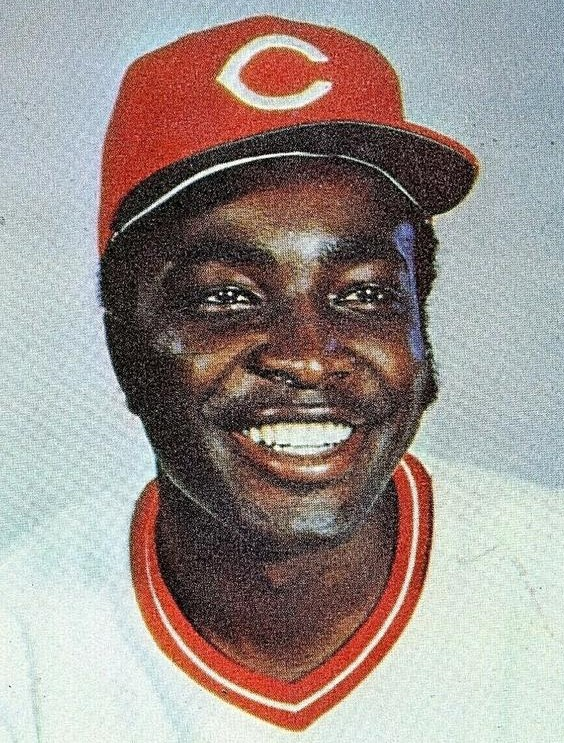
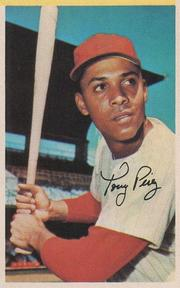
Hall of Famers (l-r): Johnny Bench, Joe Morgan, Tony Perez

The 1972 Reds won the NL West in baseball's first-ever strike-shortened season, and defeated the Pittsburgh Pirates in a five-game playoff series. They then faced the Oakland Athletics in the World Series, where six of the seven games were decided by one run. With powerful slugger Reggie Jackson sidelined by an injury incurred during Oakland's playoff series, Ohio native Gene Tenace got a chance to play in the series, delivering four home runs that tied the World Series record for homers, propelling Oakland to a dramatic seven-game series win. This was one of the few World Series in which no starting pitcher for either side pitched a complete game.

The Reds won a third NL West crown in 1973 after a dramatic second-half comeback that saw them make up 10 1/2 games on the Los Angeles Dodgers after the All-Star break. However, they lost the NL pennant to the New York Mets in five games in the NLCS. In Game 1, Tom Seaver faced Jack Billingham in a classic pitching duel, with all three runs of the 2–1 margin being scored on home runs. John Milner provided New York's run off Billingham, while Pete Rose tied the game in the seventh inning off Seaver, setting the stage for a dramatic game-ending home run by Johnny Bench in the bottom of the ninth. The New York series provided plenty of controversy surrounding the riotous behavior of Shea Stadium fans toward Pete Rose when he and Bud Harrelson scuffled after a hard slide by Rose into Harrelson at second base during the fifth inning of Game 3. A full bench-clearing fight resulted after Harrelson responded to Rose's aggressive move to prevent him from completing a double play by calling him a name. This also led to two more incidents in which play was stopped. The Reds trailed 9–2, and New York's manager Yogi Berra and legendary outfielder Willie Mays, at the request of National League president Warren Giles, appealed to fans in left field to restrain themselves. The next day the series was extended to a fifth game when Rose homered in the 12th inning to tie the series at two games each.

The Reds won 98 games in 1974 but finished second to the 102-win Los Angeles Dodgers. The 1974 season started off with much excitement, as the Atlanta Braves were in town to open the season with the Reds. Hank Aaron entered opening day with 713 home runs, one shy of tying Babe Ruth's record of 714. The first pitch Aaron swung at in the 1974 season was the record-tying home run off Jack Billingham. The next day, the Braves benched Aaron, hoping to save him for his record-breaking home run on their season-opening homestand. Then-commissioner Bowie Kuhn ordered Braves management to play Aaron the next day, where he narrowly missed a historic home run in the fifth inning. Aaron went on to set the record in Atlanta two nights later. The 1974 season also saw the debut of Hall of Fame radio announcer Marty Brennaman after Al Michaels left the Reds to broadcast for the San Francisco Giants.

With 1975, the Big Red Machine lineup solidified with the "Great Eight" starting team of Johnny Bench (catcher), Tony Pérez (first base), Joe Morgan (second base), Dave Concepción (shortstop), Pete Rose (third base), Ken Griffey (right field), César Gerónimo (center field) and George Foster (left field). The starting pitchers included Don Gullett, Fred Norman, Gary Nolan, Jack Billingham, Pat Darcy and Clay Kirby. The bullpen featured Rawly Eastwick and Will McEnaney, who combined for 37 saves, and veterans Pedro Borbón and Clay Carroll. On Opening Day, Rose still played in left field and Foster was not a starter, while John Vukovich, an off-season acquisition, was the starting third baseman. While Vuckovich was a superb fielder, he was a weak hitter. In May, with the team off to a slow start and trailing the Dodgers, Sparky Anderson made a bold move by moving Rose to third base, a position where he had very little experience, and inserting Foster in left field. This was the jolt that the Reds needed to propel them into first place, with Rose proving to be reliable on defense and the addition of Foster to the outfield giving the offense some added punch. During the season, the Reds compiled two notable streaks: 1.) winning 41 out of 50 games in one stretch, and 2.) by going a month without committing any errors on defense.

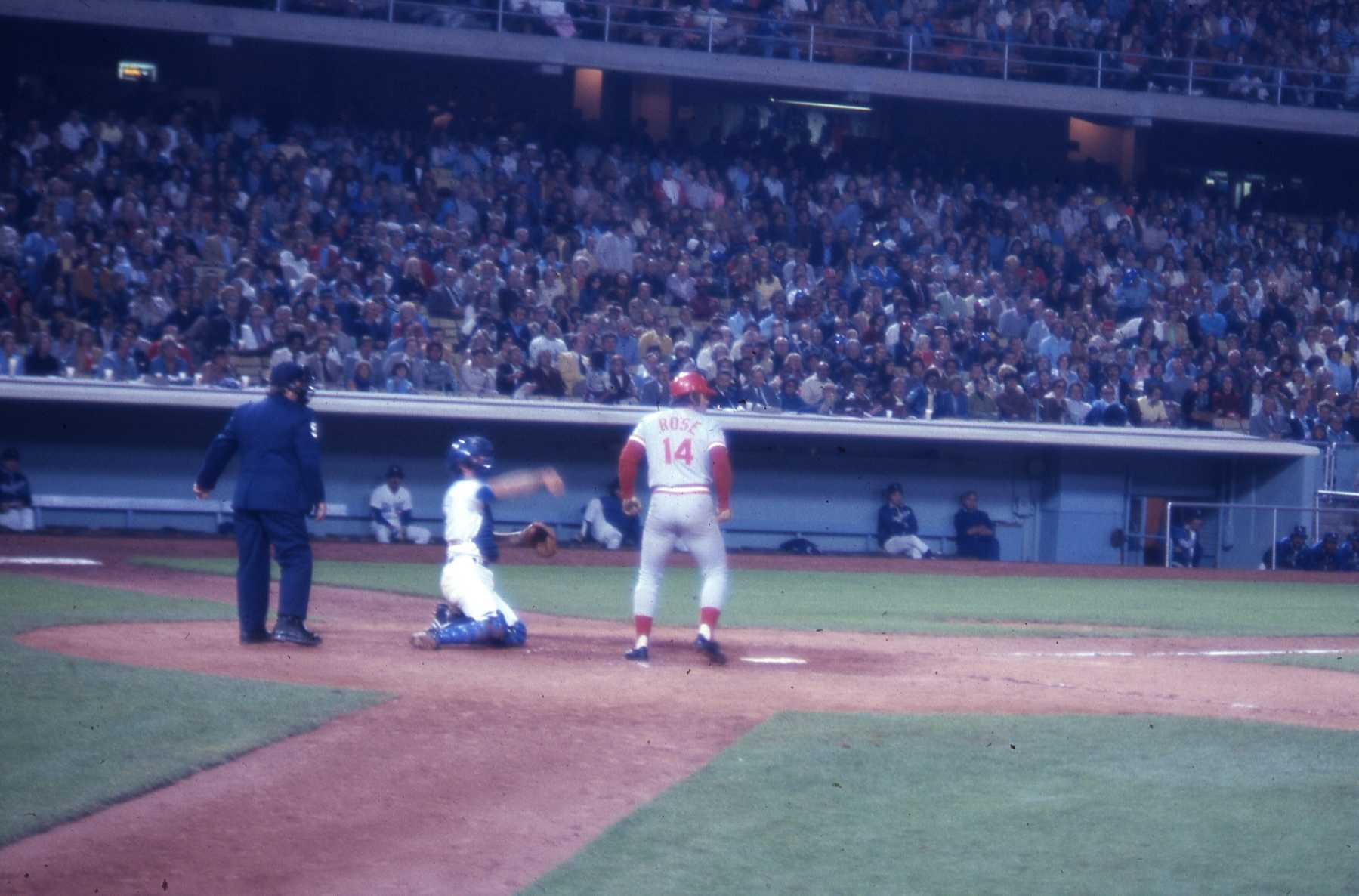
Pete Rose at bat in a game at Dodger Stadium during the 1970s

In the 1975 season, Cincinnati clinched the NL West with 108 victories before sweeping the Pittsburgh Pirates in three games to win the NL pennant. They went on to face the Boston Red Sox in the World Series, splitting the first four games and taking Game 5. After a three-day rain delay, the two teams met in Game 6, considered by many to be the best World Series game ever. The Reds were ahead 6–3 with five outs left when the Red Sox tied the game on former Red Bernie Carbo's three-run home run, his second pinch-hit, three-run homer in the series. After a few close calls both ways, Carlton Fisk hit a dramatic 12th-inning home run off the foul pole in left field to give the Red Sox a 7–6 win and force a decisive game 7. Cincinnati prevailed the next day when Morgan's RBI single won Game 7 and gave the Reds their first championship in 35 years. The Reds have not lost a World Series game since Carlton Fisk's home run, a span of nine straight wins.

1976 saw a return of the same starting eight in the field. The starting rotation was again led by Nolan, Gullett, Billingham and Norman, while the addition of rookies Pat Zachry and Santo Alcalá comprised an underrated staff in which four of the six had ERAs below 3.10. Eastwick, Borbon and McEnaney shared closer duties, recording 26, eight and seven saves, respectively. The Reds won the NL West by 10 games and went undefeated in the postseason, sweeping the Philadelphia Phillies (winning game 3 in their final at-bat) to return to the World Series, where they beat the Yankees at the newly renovated Yankee Stadium in the first Series held there since 1964. This was only the second-ever sweep of the Yankees in the World Series, and the Reds became the first NL team since the 1921–22 New York Giants to win consecutive World Series championships. The 1975 and 1976 Reds were the last NL team to repeat as champions until the Los Angeles Dodgers won back-to-back World Series in 2024 and 2025.

Beginning with the 1970 National League pennant, the Reds beat either of the two Pennsylvania-based clubs – the Philadelphia Phillies and the Pittsburgh Pirates – to win their pennants (they beat the Pirates in 1970, 1972, 1975 and 1990, and the Phillies in 1976), making the Big Red Machine part of the rivalry between the two Pennsylvania teams. In 1979, Pete Rose added further fuel to the Big Red Machine, being part of the rivalry when he signed with the Phillies and helped them win their first World Series in 1980.

=== The Machine dismantled (1977–1989) ===
The late 1970s brought turmoil and change to the Reds. Popular Tony Pérez was sent to the Montreal Expos after the 1976 season, breaking up the Big Red Machine's starting lineup. Manager Sparky Anderson and general manager Bob Howsam later considered this trade to be the biggest mistake of their careers. Starting pitcher Don Gullett left via free agency and signed with the New York Yankees. In an effort to fill that gap, a trade with the Oakland Athletics for starting ace Vida Blue was arranged during the 1977–78 offseason. However, then-commissioner Bowie Kuhn vetoed the trade in order to maintain competitive balance in baseball; some have suggested that the actual reason had more to do with Kuhn's continued feud with Athletics owner Charlie Finley. On June 15, 1977, the Reds acquired pitcher Tom Seaver from the New York Mets for Pat Zachry, Doug Flynn, Steve Henderson and Dan Norman. In other deals that proved to be less successful, the Reds traded Gary Nolan to the California Angels for Craig Hendrickson; Rawly Eastwick to the St. Louis Cardinals for Doug Capilla; and Mike Caldwell to the Milwaukee Brewers for Rick O'Keeffe and Garry Pyka, as well as Rick Auerbach from Texas. The end of the Big Red Machine era was heralded by the replacement of general manager Bob Howsam with Dick Wagner.

In his last season as a Red, Rose gave baseball a thrill as he challenged Joe DiMaggio's 56-game hitting streak, tying for the second-longest streak ever at 44 games. The streak came to an end in Atlanta after striking out in his fifth at-bat in the game against Gene Garber. Rose also earned his 3,000th hit that season, on his way to becoming baseball's all-time hits leader when he rejoined the Reds in the mid-1980s. The year also witnessed the only no-hitter of Hall of Fame pitcher Tom Seaver's career, coming against the St. Louis Cardinals on June 16, 1978.

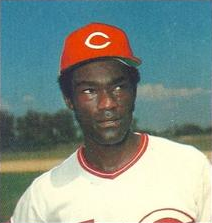
George Foster slugged 52 home runs in 1977, earning the NL MVP award.

After the 1978 season and two straight second-place finishes, Wagner fired manager Anderson in a move that proved to be unpopular. Pete Rose, who had played almost every position for the team except pitcher, shortstop and catcher since 1963, signed with Philadelphia as a free agent. By 1979, the starters were Bench (catcher), Dan Driessen (first base), Morgan (second base), Concepción (shortstop) and Ray Knight (third base), with Griffey, Foster and Geronimo again in the outfield. The pitching staff had experienced a complete turnover since 1976, except for Fred Norman. In addition to ace starter Tom Seaver, the remaining starters were Mike LaCoss, Bill Bonham and Paul Moskau. In the bullpen, only Borbon had remained. Dave Tomlin and Mario Soto worked middle relief, with Tom Hume and Doug Bair closing. The Reds won the 1979 NL West behind the pitching of Seaver, but were dispatched in the NL playoffs by the Pittsburgh Pirates. Game 2 featured a controversial play in which a ball hit by Pittsburgh's Phil Garner was caught by Reds outfielder Dave Collins but was ruled a trap, setting the Pirates up to take a 2–1 lead. The Pirates swept the series 3 games to 0 and went on to win the World Series against the Baltimore Orioles.

The 1981 team fielded a strong lineup, with only Concepción, Foster and Griffey retaining their spots from the 1975–76 heyday. After Johnny Bench was able to play only a few games as catcher each year after 1980 due to ongoing injuries, Joe Nolan took over as starting catcher. Driessen and Bench shared first base, and Knight starred at third. Morgan and Geronimo had been replaced at second base and center field by Ron Oester and Dave Collins, respectively. Mario Soto posted a banner year starting on the mound, only surpassed by the outstanding performance of Seaver's Cy Young runner-up season. La Coss, Bruce Berenyi and Frank Pastore rounded out the starting rotation. Hume again led the bullpen as closer, joined by Bair and Joe Price. In 1981, the Reds had the best overall record in baseball, but finished second in the division in both of the half-seasons that resulted from a mid-season players' strike, and missed the playoffs. To commemorate this, a team photo was taken, accompanied by a banner that read "Baseball's Best Record 1981."

By 1982, the Reds were a shell of the original Red Machine, having lost 101 games that year. Johnny Bench, after an unsuccessful transition to third base, retired a year later.

After the heartbreak of 1981, general manager Dick Wagner pursued the strategy of ridding the team of veterans, including third baseman Knight and the entire starting outfield of Griffey, Foster and Collins. Bench, after being able to catch only seven games in 1981, was moved from platooning at first base to be the starting third baseman; Alex Treviño became the regular starting catcher. The outfield was staffed with Paul Householder, César Cedeño and future Colorado Rockies and Pittsburgh Pirates manager Clint Hurdle on Opening Day. Hurdle was an immediate bust, and rookie Eddie Milner took his place in the starting outfield early in the year. The highly touted Householder struggled throughout the year despite extensive playing time. Cedeno, while providing steady veteran play, was a disappointment, unable to recapture his glory days with the Houston Astros. The starting rotation featured the emergence of a dominant Mario Soto and featured strong years by Pastore and Bruce Berenyi, but Seaver was injured all year, and their efforts were wasted without a strong offensive lineup. Tom Hume still led the bullpen along with Joe Price, but the colorful Brad "The Animal" Lesley was unable to consistently excel, and former All-Star Jim Kern was also a disappointment. Kern was also publicly upset over having to shave off his prominent beard to join the Reds, and helped force the issue of getting traded during mid-season by growing it back. The season also saw the midseason firing of manager John McNamara, who was replaced as skipper by Russ Nixon.

The Reds fell to the bottom of the Western Division for the next few years. After the 1982 season, Seaver was traded back to the Mets. 1983 found Dann Bilardello behind the plate, Bench returning to part-time duty at first base, rookie Nick Esasky taking over at third base and Gary Redus taking over from Cedeno. Tom Hume's effectiveness as a closer had diminished, and no other consistent relievers emerged. Dave Concepción was the sole remaining starter from the Big Red Machine era.

Wagner's tenure ended in 1983, when Howsam, the architect of the Big Red Machine, was brought back. The popular Howsam began his second term as the Reds' general manager by signing Cincinnati native Dave Parker as a free agent from Pittsburgh. In 1984, the Reds began to move up, depending on trades and some minor leaguers. In that season, Dave Parker, Dave Concepción and Tony Pérez were in Cincinnati uniforms. In August of the same year, Pete Rose was reacquired and hired to be the Reds player-manager. After raising the franchise from the grave, Howsam gave way to the administration of Bill Bergesch, who attempted to build the team around a core of highly regarded young players in addition to veterans like Parker. However, he was unable to capitalize on an excess of young and highly touted position players including Kurt Stillwell, Tracy Jones and Kal Daniels by trading them for pitching. Despite the emergence of Tom Browning as Rookie of the Year in 1985, when he won 20 games, the rotation was devastated by the early demise of Mario Soto's career to arm injury.

Under Bergesch, the Reds finished second four times from 1985 to 1989. Among the highlights, Rose became the all-time hits leader, Tom Browning threw a perfect game, Eric Davis became the first player in baseball history to hit at least 35 home runs and steal 50 bases, and Chris Sabo was the 1988 National League Rookie of the Year. The Reds also had a bullpen star in John Franco, who was with the team from 1984 to 1989. Rose once had Concepción pitch late in a game at Dodger Stadium. In 1989, following the release of the Dowd Report, which accused Rose of betting on baseball games, Rose was banned from baseball by Commissioner Bart Giamatti, who declared him guilty of "conduct detrimental to baseball."

=== World championship and the end of an era (1990–2002) ===
In 1987, general manager Bergesch was replaced by Murray Cook, who initiated a series of deals that would finally bring the Reds back to the championship, starting with acquisitions of Danny Jackson and José Rijo. An aging Dave Parker was let go after a revival of his career in Cincinnati following the Pittsburgh drug trials. Barry Larkin emerged as the starting shortstop over Kurt Stillwell, who, along with reliever Ted Power, was traded for Jackson. In 1989, Cook was succeeded by Bob Quinn, who put the final pieces of the championship puzzle together, with the acquisitions of Hal Morris, Billy Hatcher and Randy Myers.

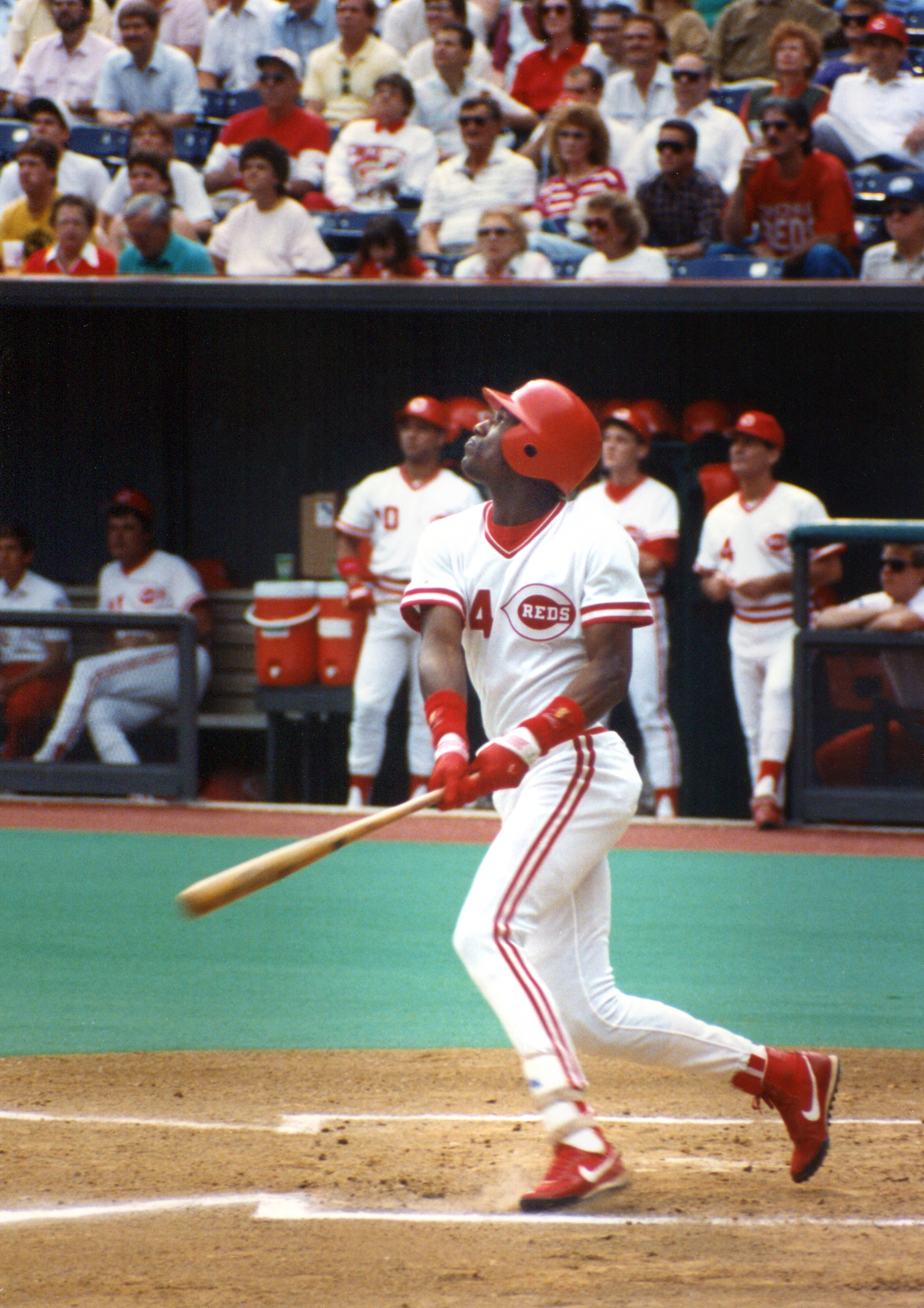
Eric Davis in 1990

In 1990, the Reds, under new manager Lou Piniella, shocked baseball by leading the NL West from wire-to-wire, making them the only NL team to do so. Winning their first nine games, they started 33–12 and maintained their lead throughout the year. Led by Chris Sabo, Barry Larkin, Eric Davis, Paul O'Neill and Billy Hatcher on the field, and by José Rijo, Tom Browning and the "Nasty Boys" – Rob Dibble, Norm Charlton and Randy Myers – on the mound, the Reds took out the Pirates in the NLCS. The Reds swept the heavily favored Oakland Athletics in four straight and extended a winning streak in the World Series to nine consecutive games. This Series, however, saw Eric Davis severely bruise a kidney diving for a fly ball in Game 4, and his play was greatly limited the next year.

In 1992, Quinn was replaced in the front office by Jim Bowden. On the field, manager Lou Piniella wanted outfielder Paul O'Neill to be a power hitter to fill the void Eric Davis left when he was traded to the Los Angeles Dodgers in exchange for Tim Belcher. However, O'Neill only hit .246 with 14 home runs. The Reds returned to winning after a losing season in 1991, but 90 wins was only enough for second place behind the division-winning Atlanta Braves. Before the season ended, Piniella got into an altercation with reliever Rob Dibble. In the offseason, Paul O'Neill was traded to the New York Yankees for outfielder Roberto Kelly, who was a disappointment for the Reds over the next couple of years, while O'Neill led a downtrodden Yankees franchise to a return to glory. Around this time, the Reds would replace their Big Red Machine–era uniforms in favor of a pinstriped uniform with no sleeves.

Controversy erupted after the 1992 season when team owner Marge Schott was reported to have racially and ethnically slurred players and business associates, and in a November interview, praised the early efforts of Adolf Hitler. As punishment, Major League Baseball's executive council prevented her from exercising day-to-day oversight of the Reds during the 1993 season.

For the 1993 season, manager Piniella was replaced by fan favorite Tony Pérez, but he lasted only 44 games at the helm before being replaced by Davey Johnson. With Johnson steering the team, the Reds made steady progress. In 1994, the Reds were in the newly created National League Central Division with the Chicago Cubs, St. Louis Cardinals, and rivals Pittsburgh Pirates and Houston Astros. By the time the strike hit, the Reds finished a half-game ahead of the Houston Astros for first place in the NL Central. In 1995, the Reds won the division thanks to MVP Barry Larkin. After defeating the NL West champion Dodgers in the first NLDS since 1981, however, they lost to the Atlanta Braves. This would be the last playoff appearance for the Reds for 15 years, and is to date the last time the Reds have advanced in the playoffs. Their ongoing 30-year drought without winning a playoff series is the longest active streak in MLB.

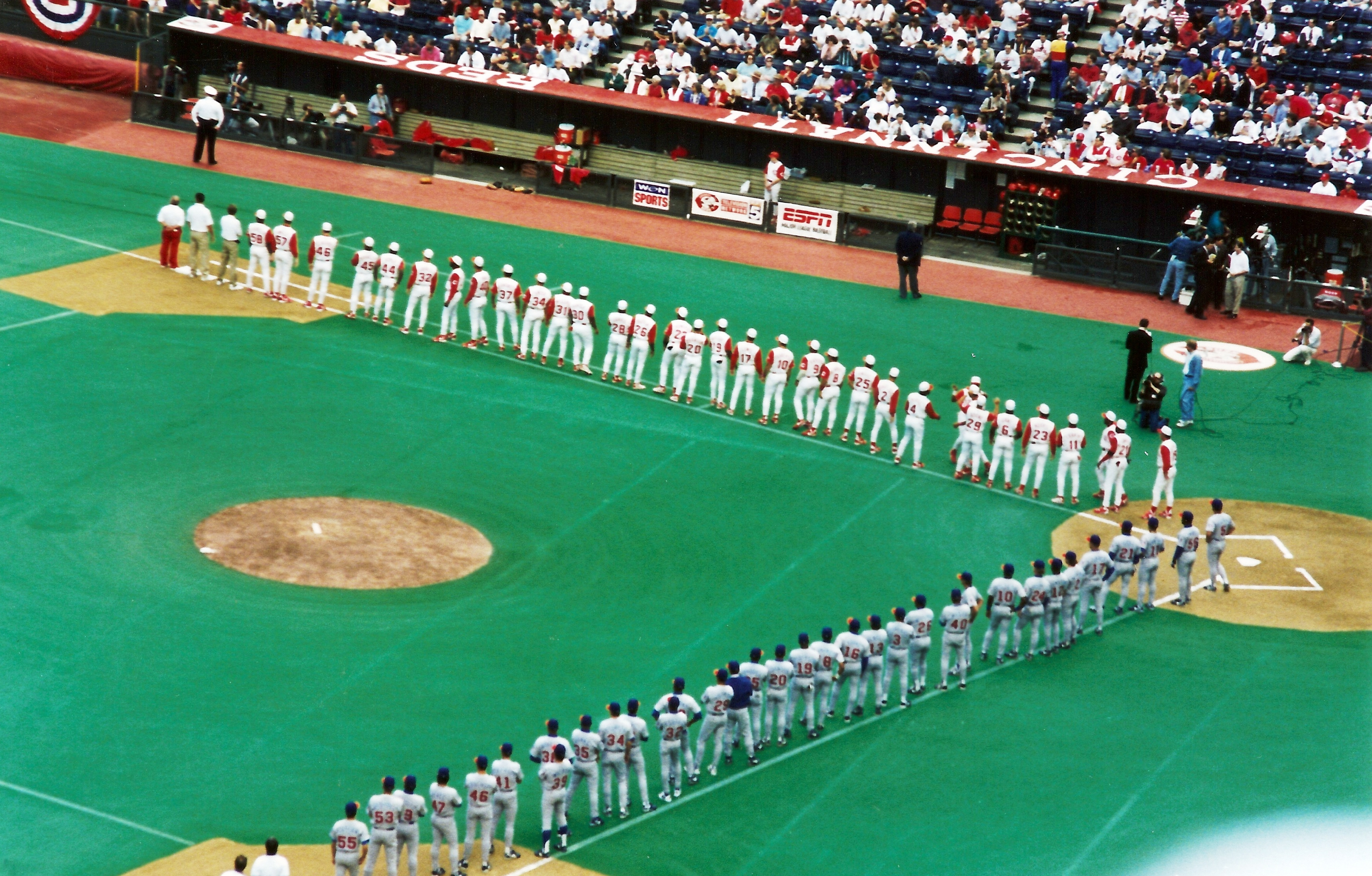
Opening day at Riverfront Stadium, 1995

Team owner Schott had decided before the 1995 season that manager Johnson would be gone by the end of the year, regardless of the team's outcome, to be replaced by former Reds third baseman Ray Knight. Schott did not like Johnson, and she did not approve of Johnson living with his fiancée before they were married. In contrast, Knight, along with his wife, professional golfer Nancy Lopez, were friends of Schott. The team took a dive under Knight, who was unable to complete two full seasons as manager and was subjected to complaints in the press about his strict managerial style.

Marge Schott found herself the subject of further controversy when, in May 1996, she reiterated her 1992 praise for Hitler in an ESPN interview. The MLB executive council threatened to sanction her again, but she instead agreed step aside from day-to-day operations through 1998. In 1999, she sold a controlling stake in the team to a group led by Carl Lindner, retaining a minority interest, and never again directed the team's operations.

In 1999, the Reds won 96 games, led by manager Jack McKeon, but lost to the New York Mets in a one-game playoff. Despite an 85–77 finish in 2000, and being named 1999 NL manager of the year, McKeon was fired after the 2000 season. The Reds did not have another winning season until 2010.

=== Contemporary era (2003–present) ===
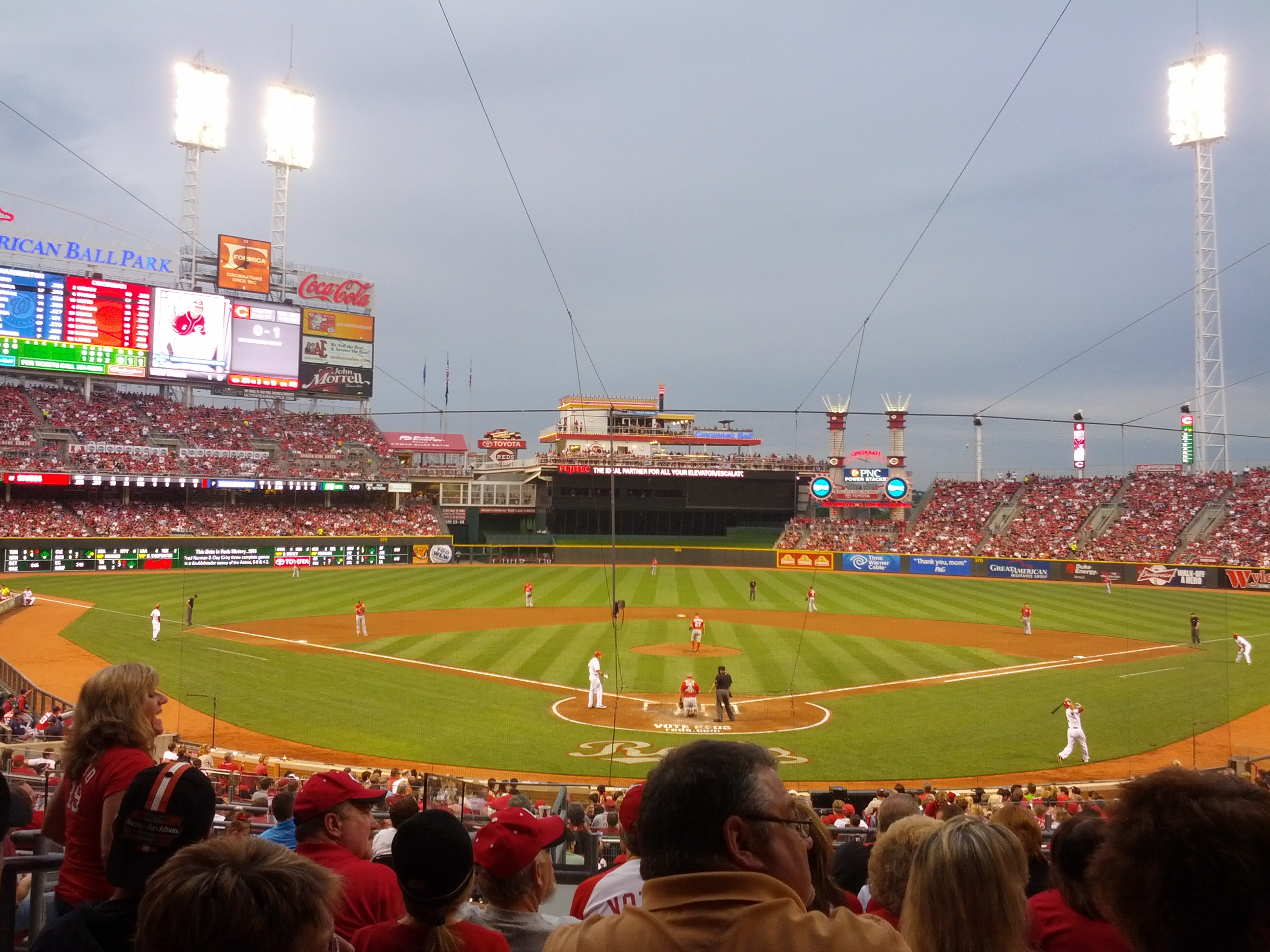
Great American Ball Park, the Reds' home stadium since 2003

Riverfront Stadium, by then known as Cinergy Field, was demolished in 2002. Great American Ball Park opened in 2003, with high expectations for a team led by local favorites, including outfielder Ken Griffey Jr., shortstop Barry Larkin and first baseman Sean Casey. Although attendance improved considerably with the new ballpark, the Reds continued to lose. Schott had not invested much in the farm system since the early 1990s, leaving the team relatively thin on talent. After years of promises that the club was rebuilding toward the opening of the new ballpark, general manager Jim Bowden and manager Bob Boone were fired on July 28. This broke up the father-son combo of manager Bob Boone and third baseman Aaron Boone, and the latter was soon traded to the New York Yankees. Tragedy struck in November when Dernell Stenson, a promising young outfielder, was shot and killed during a carjack. Following the season, Dan O'Brien was hired as the Reds' 16th general manager on October 27, 2003, succeeding Jim Bowden.

The 2004 and 2005 seasons continued the trend of big-hitting, poor pitching and poor records. Griffey, Jr. joined the 500 home run club in 2004, but was again hampered by injuries. Adam Dunn emerged as consistent home run hitter, including a 535-foot (163 m) home run against José Lima. He also broke the major league record for strikeouts in 2004. Although a number of free agents were signed before 2005, the Reds were quickly in last place, and manager Dave Miley was forced out in the 2005 midseason and replaced by Jerry Narron. Like many other small-market clubs, the Reds dispatched some of their veteran players and began entrusting their future to a young nucleus that included Adam Dunn and Austin Kearns.

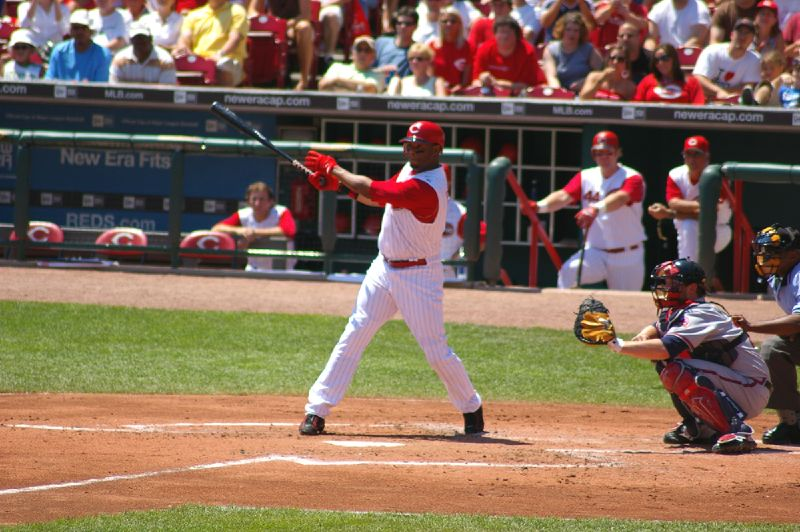
Ken Griffey Jr. played in his hometown of Cincinnati from 2000 to 2008.

2004 saw the opening of the Cincinnati Reds Hall of Fame (HOF), which had been in existence in name only since the 1950s, with player plaques, photos and other memorabilia scattered throughout their front offices. Ownership and management desired a standalone facility where the public could walk through interactive displays, see locker room recreations, watch videos of classic Reds moments and peruse historical items, such as the history of Reds uniforms dating back to the 1920s or a baseball marking every hit Pete Rose had during his career.

Robert Castellini took over as controlling owner from Lindner in 2006. Castellini promptly fired general manager Dan O'Brien and hired Wayne Krivsky. The Reds made a run at the playoffs, but ultimately fell short. The 2007 season was again mired in mediocrity. Midway through the season, Jerry Narron was fired as manager and replaced by Pete Mackanin. The Reds ended up posting a winning record under Mackanin, but finished the season in fifth place in the Central Division. Mackanin was manager in an interim capacity only, and the Reds, seeking a big name to fill the spot, ultimately brought in Dusty Baker. Early in the 2008 season, Krivsky was fired and replaced by Walt Jocketty. Although the Reds did not win under Krivsky, he is credited with revamping the farm system and signing young talent that could potentially lead the team to success in the future.

The Reds failed to post winning records in both 2008 and 2009. In 2010, with NL MVP Joey Votto and Gold Glovers Brandon Phillips and Scott Rolen, the Reds posted a 91–71 record and were NL Central champions. The following week, the Reds became only the second team in MLB history to be no-hit in a postseason game when Philadelphia's Roy Halladay shut down the National League's No. 1 offense in Game 1 of the NLDS. The Reds eventually lost in a three-game sweep of the NLDS to Philadelphia.

After coming off their surprising 2010 NL Central Division title, the Reds fell short of many expectations for the 2011 season. Multiple injuries and inconsistent starting pitching played a big role in their mid-season collapse, along with a less productive offense as compared to the previous year. The Reds ended the season at 79–83, and won the 2012 NL Central Division Title. On September 28, Homer Bailey threw a 1–0 no-hitter against the Pittsburgh Pirates, marking the first Reds no-hitter since Tom Browning's perfect game in 1988. Finishing with a 97–65 record, the Reds earned the second seed in the Division Series and a matchup with the eventual World Series champion, the San Francisco Giants. After taking a 2–0 lead with road victories at AT&T Park, they headed home looking to win the series. However, they lost three straight at their home ballpark, becoming the first National League team since the Chicago Cubs in 1984 to lose a division series after leading 2–0.

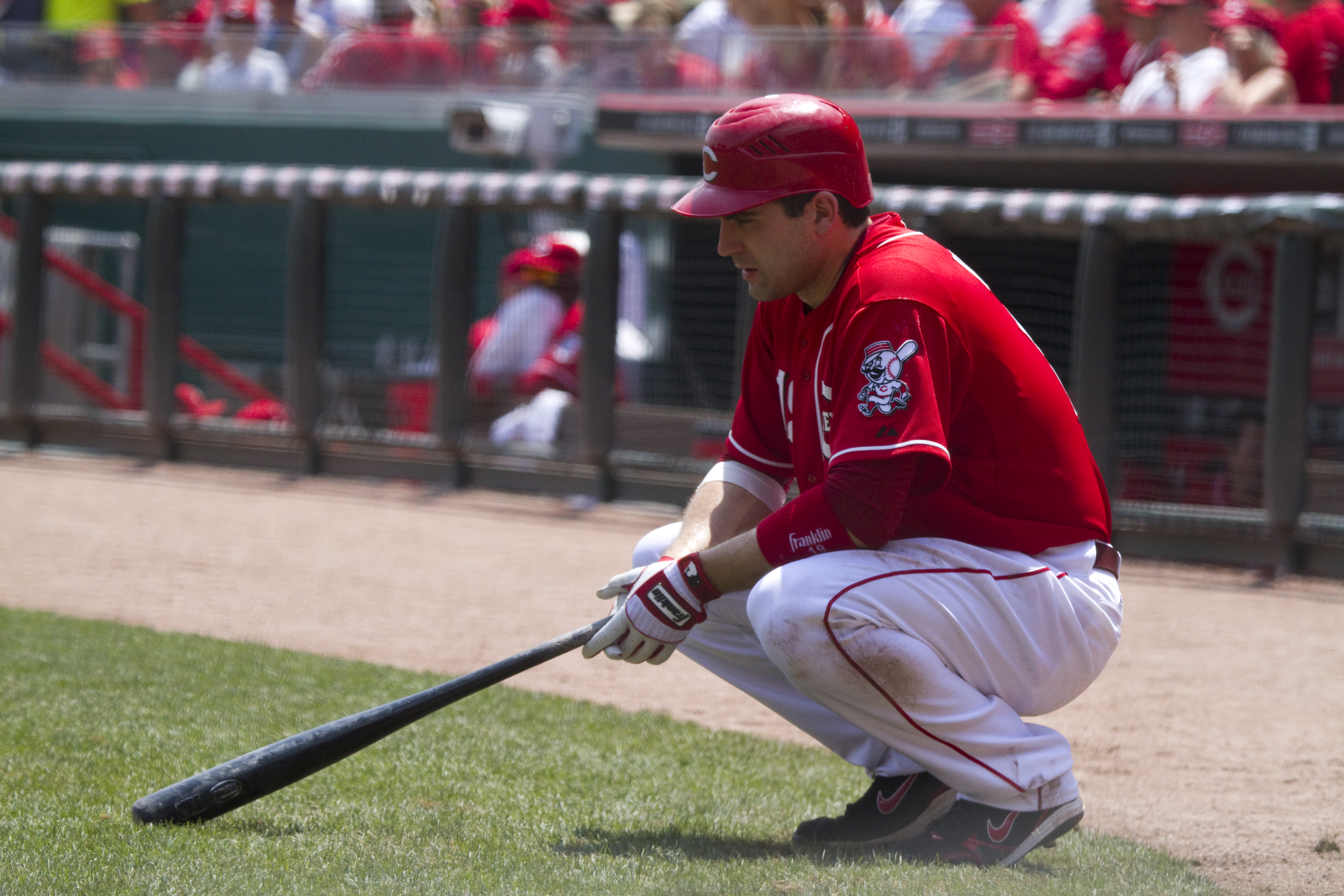
Joey Votto, first baseman (2007–2023)

In the offseason, the team traded outfielder Drew Stubbs – as part of a three-team deal with the Arizona Diamondbacks and Cleveland Indians – to the Indians, and in turn received right fielder Shin-Soo Choo. On July 2, 2013, Homer Bailey pitched a no-hitter against the San Francisco Giants for a 4–0 Reds victory, making him the third pitcher in Reds history with two complete-game no-hitters in their career.

Following six consecutive losses to close out the 2013 season, including a loss to the Pittsburgh Pirates at PNC Park in the National League wild-card playoff game, the Reds decided to fire Dusty Baker. During his six years as manager, Baker led the Reds to the playoff three times; however, they never advanced beyond the first round.

On October 22, 2013, the Reds hired pitching coach Bryan Price to replace Baker as manager. Under Price, the Reds were led by pitchers Johnny Cueto and the hard-throwing Aroldis Chapman. The offense was led by All-Star third baseman Todd Frazier, Joey Votto and Brandon Phillips, but although they had plenty of star power, the Reds never got off to a good start and ended the season in lowly fourth place in the division to go along with a 76–86 record. During the offseason, the Reds traded pitchers Alfredo Simón to the Tigers and Mat Latos to the Marlins. In return, they acquired young talents such as Eugenio Suárez and Anthony DeSclafani. They also acquired veteran slugger Marlon Byrd from the Phillies to play left field.

The Reds' 2015 season wasn't much better, as they finished with the second-worst record in the league at 64–98, their worst finish since 1982. The Reds were forced to trade star pitchers Johnny Cueto and Mike Leake to the Kansas City Royals and San Francisco Giants, respectively, receiving minor league pitching prospects for both. Shortly after the season's end, the Reds traded Home Run Derby champion Todd Frazier to the Chicago White Sox and closing pitcher Aroldis Chapman to the New York Yankees.

In 2016, the Reds broke the then-record for home runs allowed during a single season, The Reds held this record until the 2019 season when it was broken by the Baltimore Orioles. The previous record holder was the 1996 Detroit Tigers with 241 home runs yielded to opposing teams. The Reds went 68–94 and again were one of the worst teams in MLB. The Reds traded outfielder Jay Bruce to the Mets just before the July 31 non-waiver trade deadline in exchange for two prospects: infielder Dilson Herrera and pitcher Max Wotell. During the offseason, the Reds traded Brandon Phillips to the Atlanta Braves in exchange for two minor league pitchers.

On September 25, 2020, the Reds earned their first postseason berth since 2013, ultimately earning the seventh seed in the expanded 2020 playoffs. The 2020 season had been shortened to 60 games as a result of the COVID-19 pandemic. The Reds lost their first-round series against the Atlanta Braves two games to none.

The Reds finished the 2021 season with a record of 83–79, good for third in the NL Central.

In 2022, the Reds started out the regular season with a ghastly 3–22 record. Their three-game win total in 25 games had not seen since the 2003 Detroit Tigers and was tied for second-worst overall behind the 1988 Baltimore Orioles, who started 2–23 in their first 25 games. They would finish the season with a record of 62–100.

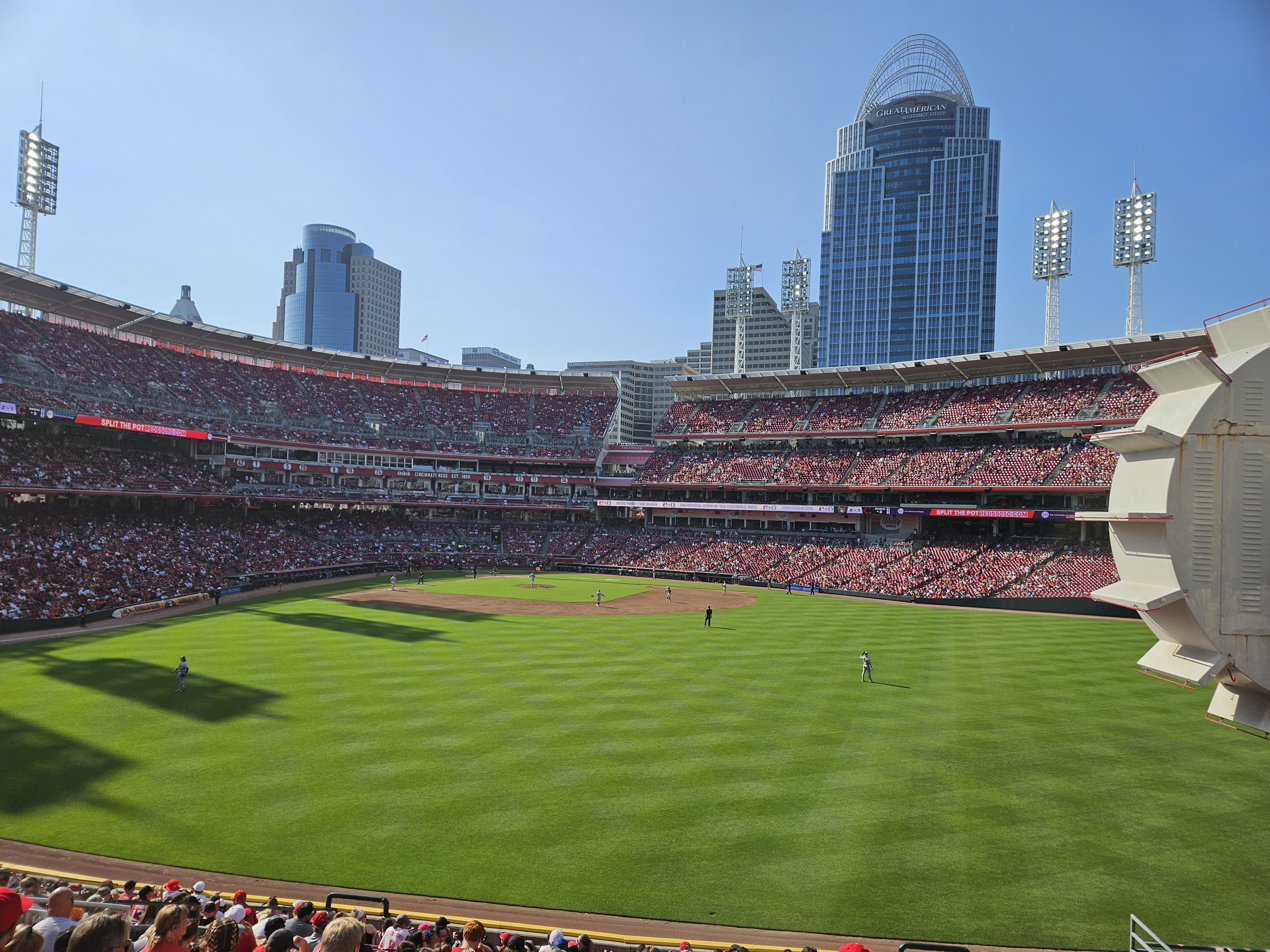
The Reds up to bat vs the Milwaukee Brewers in 2023 matchup

The 2023 season found the Reds in contention for a wild card berth up until the final weekend of the season. They eventually fell short of a playoff berth by 2 games with a record of 82–80. The team was led by a group of young players including rookies Spencer Steer, Matt McLain and Elly De La Cruz. De La Cruz caused quite a buzz from the beginning of his mid-season call up and in his 15th career game became the first Red to hit for the cycle since Eric Davis in 1989. At the end of the season, retirement speculation surrounded former MVP Joey Votto.

With high hopes of competing in the 2024 season, the Reds started off strong, beginning the season 14–11, winning the season series against the 2023 NLCS runner-up Philadelphia Phillies 4–3. However, they went 9–18 in the month of May, dropping their chances of making the playoffs. While the Reds went on to play well against contenders, they struggled against teams playing under .500. This ultimately made them fall short, specifically in one run games where they ranked second-to-last in MLB, only in front of the Chicago White Sox.

On September 22, 2024, the Reds fired manager David Bell with only five games remaining in the season. Bench coach Freddie Benavides was named interim manager. The Reds also fired co-bench coach and infield coach Jeff Pickler. On October 4, 2024, the team announced that Terry Francona would be hired as the team's next manager.

On October 8, 2024, the Reds fired hitting coach Joel McKeithan and his assistants, Terry Bradshaw and Tim Lamonte. On October 24, 2024, the Reds announced that former Red and Cleveland Guardians hitting coach Chris Valaika would be the team's new director of hitting and MLB hitting coach.

The Reds bounced back in 2025. With offseason trades for Gavin Lux and Brady Singer, the Reds improved their depth both in the field and at the plate. This turned out to be prudent, as top pitching prospect Rhett Lowder – slated to be a fixture in the rotation – was sidelined before the season even began. They did not get swept in 2025 until the August 25–27 series at Los Angeles Dodgers and would be swept one more time in the Sept 12–14 series at Athletics. They finished the season 83–79, but by virtue of winning the season series against the New York Mets 4–2, the Reds would make their first postseason appearance since the shortened 2020 season and first 162-game-season postseason appearance since 2013. The Reds would lose the Wild Card round to the Dodgers in two games.

== Ballparks ==
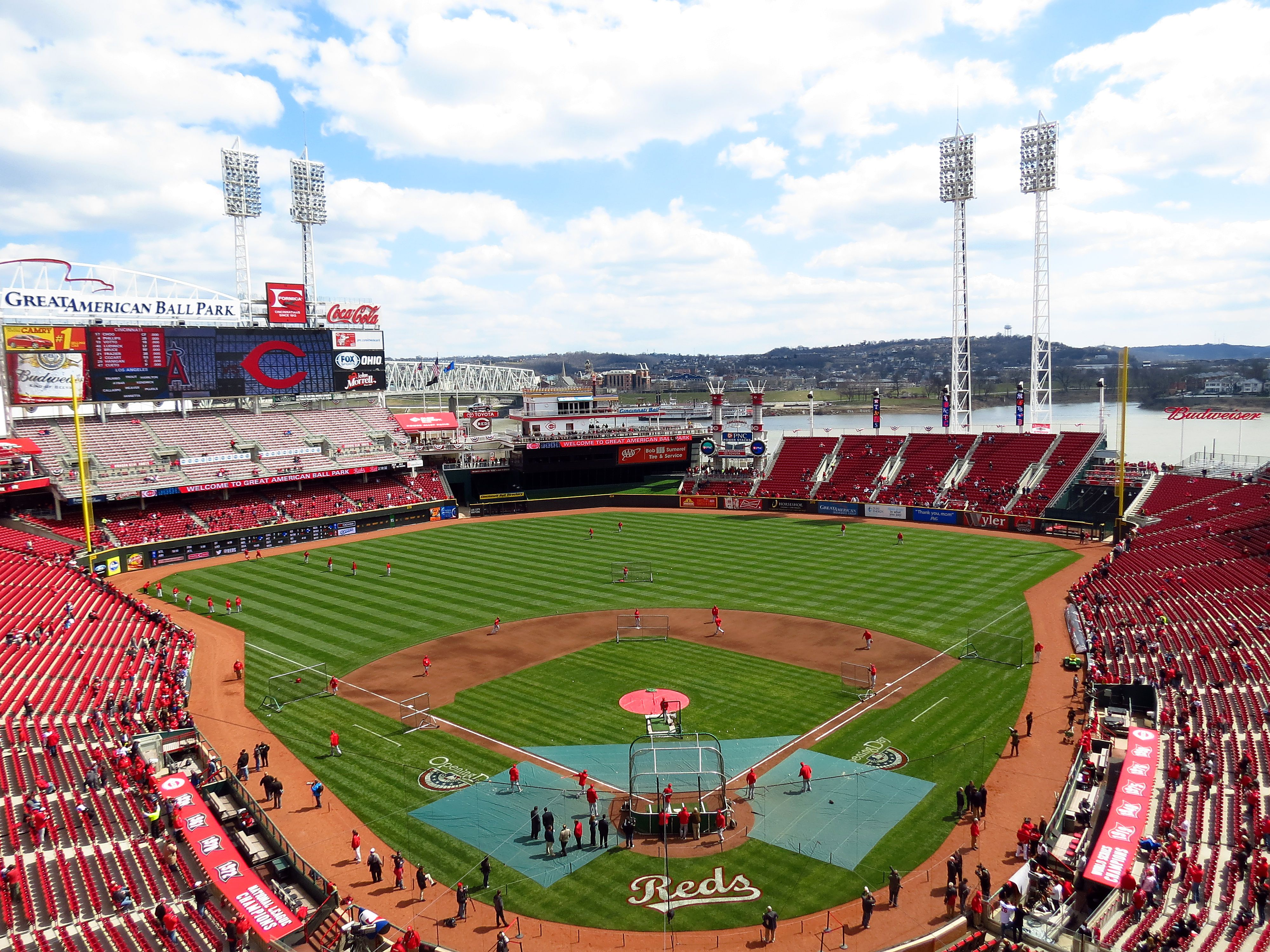
Great American Ball Park opened in 2003 along the Ohio River.

The Cincinnati Reds play their home games at Great American Ball Park, located at 100 Joe Nuxhall Way, in downtown Cincinnati. Great American Ball Park opened in 2003 at the cost of $290 million and has a capacity of 42,271. Along with serving as the home field for the Reds, the stadium also holds the Cincinnati Reds Hall of Fame, which was added as a part of Reds tradition allowing fans to walk through the history of the franchise as well as participating in many interactive baseball features.

Great American Ball Park is the seventh home of the Cincinnati Reds, built immediately to the east of the site on which Riverfront Stadium, later named Cinergy Field, once stood. The first ballpark the Reds occupied was Bank Street Grounds from 1882 to 1883 until they moved to League Park I in 1884, where they would remain until 1893. Through the late 1890s and early 1900s, the Reds moved to two different parks, where they stayed for less than 10 years: League Park II was the third home field for the Reds from 1894 to 1901, and then they moved to the Palace of the Fans, which served as the home of the Reds in the 1910s. It was in 1912 that the Reds moved to Crosley Field, which they called home for 58 years. Crosley served as the home field for the Reds for two World Series titles and five National League pennants. Beginning June 30, 1970, and during the dynasty of the Big Red Machine, the Reds played in Riverfront Stadium, appropriately named due to its location right by the Ohio River. Riverfront saw three World Series titles and five National League pennants. It was in the late 1990s that the city agreed to build two separate stadiums on the riverfront for the Reds and the Cincinnati Bengals. Thus, in 2003, the Reds began a new era with the opening of the current stadium.

The Reds hold their spring training in Goodyear, Arizona, at Goodyear Ballpark. The Reds moved into this stadium and the Cactus League in 2010 after staying in the Grapefruit League for most of their history. The Reds share Goodyear Park with their rivals in Ohio, the Cleveland Guardians.

== Logos and uniforms ==
=== Logo ===
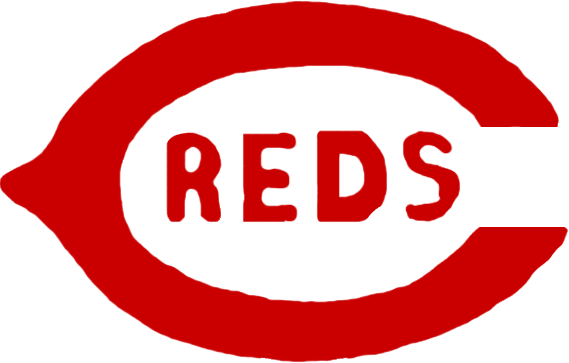
Logo (1915–1919)

Throughout the team's history, many different variations of the classic wishbone "C" logo have been introduced. In the team's early history, the Reds logo has been simply the wishbone "C" with the word "REDS" inside, the only colors used being red and white. However, during the 1950s, during the renaming and re-branding of the team as the Cincinnati Redlegs because of the connections to communism of the word "Reds," the color blue was introduced as part of the Reds color combination. During the 1960s and 1970s, the Reds saw a move toward the more traditional colors, abandoning the navy blue. A new logo also appeared with the new era of baseball in 1972, when the team went away from the script "REDS" inside of the "C," instead putting their mascot, Mr. Redlegs, in its place as well as putting the name of the team inside of the wishbone "C." In the 1990s, the more traditional, early logos of Reds came back with the current logo reflecting more of what the team's logo was when they were founded.

=== Uniforms ===
Along with the logo, the Reds' uniforms have been changed many different times throughout their history. Following their departure from being called the "Redlegs" in 1956, the Reds made a groundbreaking change to their uniforms with the use of sleeveless jerseys, seen only once before in the Major Leagues by the Chicago Cubs. At home and away, the cap was all-red with a white wishbone "C" insignia. The long-sleeved undershirts were red. The uniform was plain white with a red wishbone "C" logo on the left and the uniform number on the right. On the road, the wishbone "C" was replaced by the mustachioed "Mr. Redlegs" logo, the pillbox-hat-wearing man with a baseball for a head. The home stockings were red with six white stripes. The away stockings had only three white stripes.

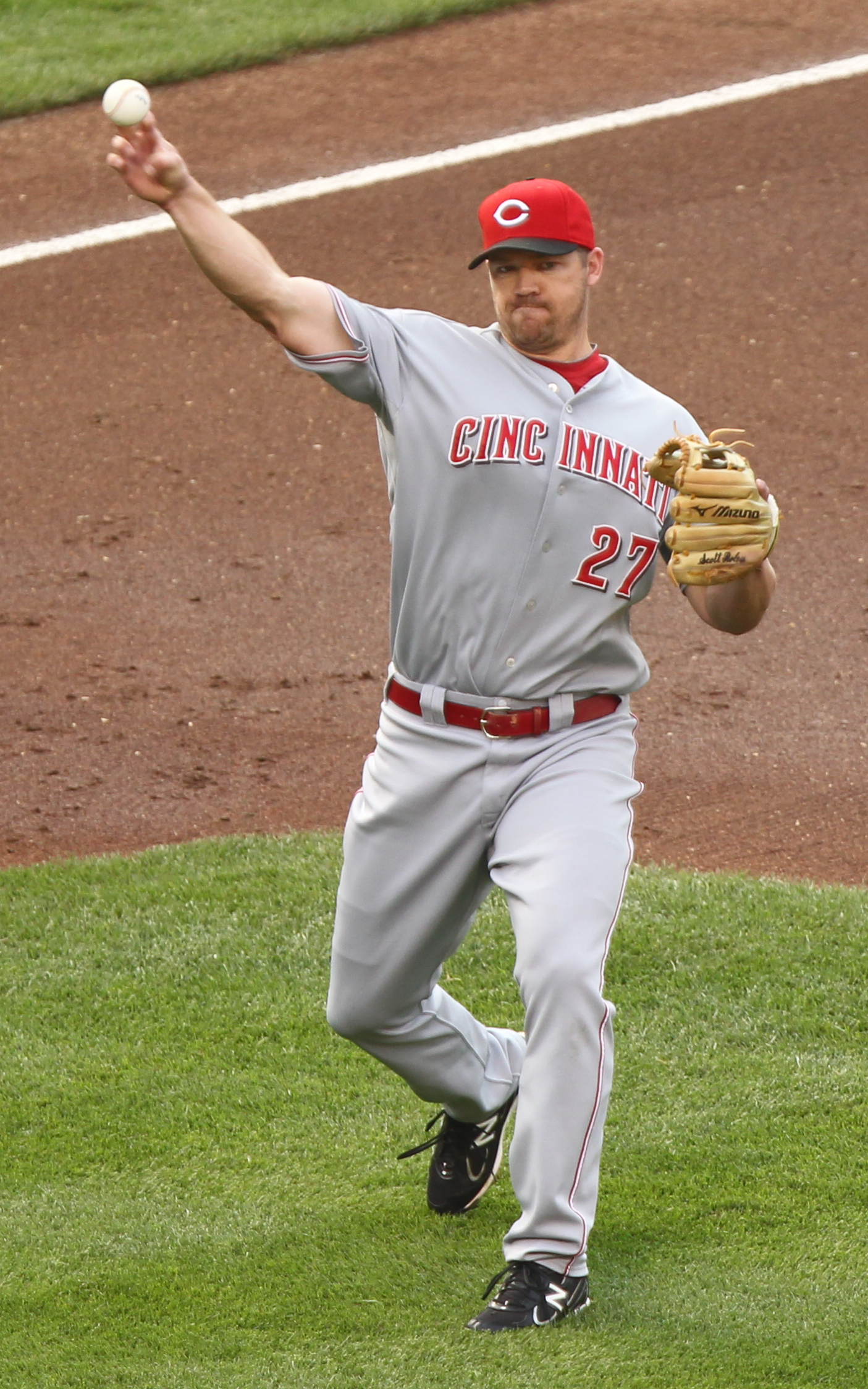
Scott Rolen wearing the current Reds away uniform, featuring classic lettering.

The Reds changed uniforms again in 1961, when they replaced the traditional wishbone "C" insignia with an oval-shaped "C" logo, but continued to use the sleeveless jerseys. At home, the Reds wore white caps with the red bill with the oval "C" in red, white sleeveless jerseys with red pinstripes, with the oval "C-REDS" logo in black with red lettering on the left breast and the number in red on the right. The gray away uniform included a gray cap with the red oval "C" and a red bill. Their gray away uniforms, which also included a sleeveless jersey, bore "CINCINNATI" in an arched block style across with the number below on the left. In 1964, players' last names were placed on the back of each set of uniforms, below the numbers. Those uniforms were scrapped after the 1966 season.

However, the Cincinnati uniform design most familiar to baseball enthusiasts is the one whose basic form, with minor variations, held sway for 25 seasons from 1967 to 1992. Most significantly, the point was restored to the "C" insignia, making it a wishbone again. During this era, the Reds wore all-red caps both at home and on the road. The caps bore the simple wishbone "C" insignia in white. The uniforms were standard short-sleeved jerseys and standard trousers – white at home and gray on the road. The home uniform featured the wishbone "C-REDS" logo in red with white type on the left breast and the uniform number in red on the right. The away uniform bore "CINCINNATI" in an arched block style across the front with the uniform number below on the left. Red, long-sleeved undershirts and plain red stirrups over white sanitary stockings completed the basic design. The Reds wore pinstriped home uniforms in 1967 only, and the uniforms were flannel through 1971, changing to double-knits with pullover jerseys and belt-less pants in 1972. Those uniforms lasted 20 seasons, and the 1992 Reds were the last MLB team to date whose primary uniforms featured pullover jerseys and belt-less pants.

The 1993 uniforms, which did away with the pullovers and brought back button-down jerseys, kept white and gray as the base colors for the home and away uniforms, but added red pinstripes. The home jerseys were sleeveless, showing more of the red undershirts. The color scheme of the "C-REDS" logo on the home uniform was reversed, now red lettering on a white background. A new home cap was created that had a red bill and a white crown with red pinstripes and a red wishbone "C" insignia. The away uniform kept the all-red cap, but moved the uniform number to the left to more closely match the home uniform. The only additional change to these uniforms was the introduction of black as a primary color of the Reds in 1999, especially on their road uniforms.

The Reds' latest uniform change came in December 2006, which differed significantly from the uniforms worn during the previous eight seasons. The home caps returned to an all-red design with a white wishbone "C," lightly outlined in black. Caps with red crowns and a black bill became the new road caps. Additionally, the sleeveless jersey was abandoned for a more traditional design. The numbers and lettering for the names on the backs of the jerseys were changed to an early 1900s–style typeface, and a handlebar-mustached "Mr. Redlegs" – reminiscent of the logo used by the Reds in the 1950s and 1960s – was placed on the left sleeve.

In 2023, the Reds and Nike, Inc. introduced a new City Connect jersey, which features a modified "C" on the cap and on the sleeve of the jersey. For the Jersey, it features "CINCY" (shorten for Cincinnati) across the chest of the jersey. On the collar, it features an Ohio Buckeye and also features the motto of Cincinnati "Juncta Juvant" (Latin for "Strength of Unity"). The design of the jersey is to inspire the future of the Reds jersey. A second City Connect uniform was released in 2026, using an all-red variation of their first City Connect uniform with the modified "C" and black numbers on the chest.

== Awards and accolades ==
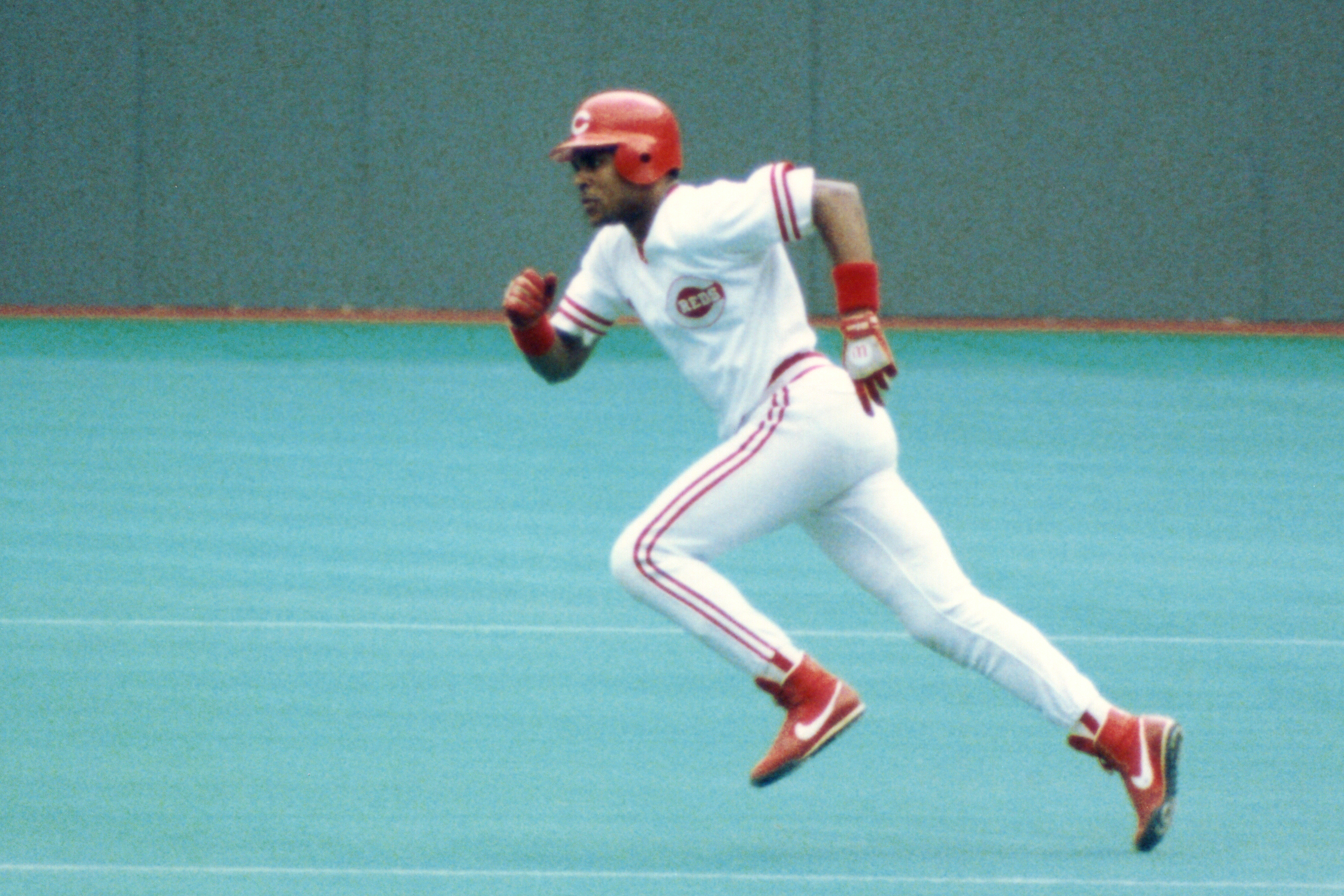
Barry Larkin playing in Riverfront Stadium in 1990

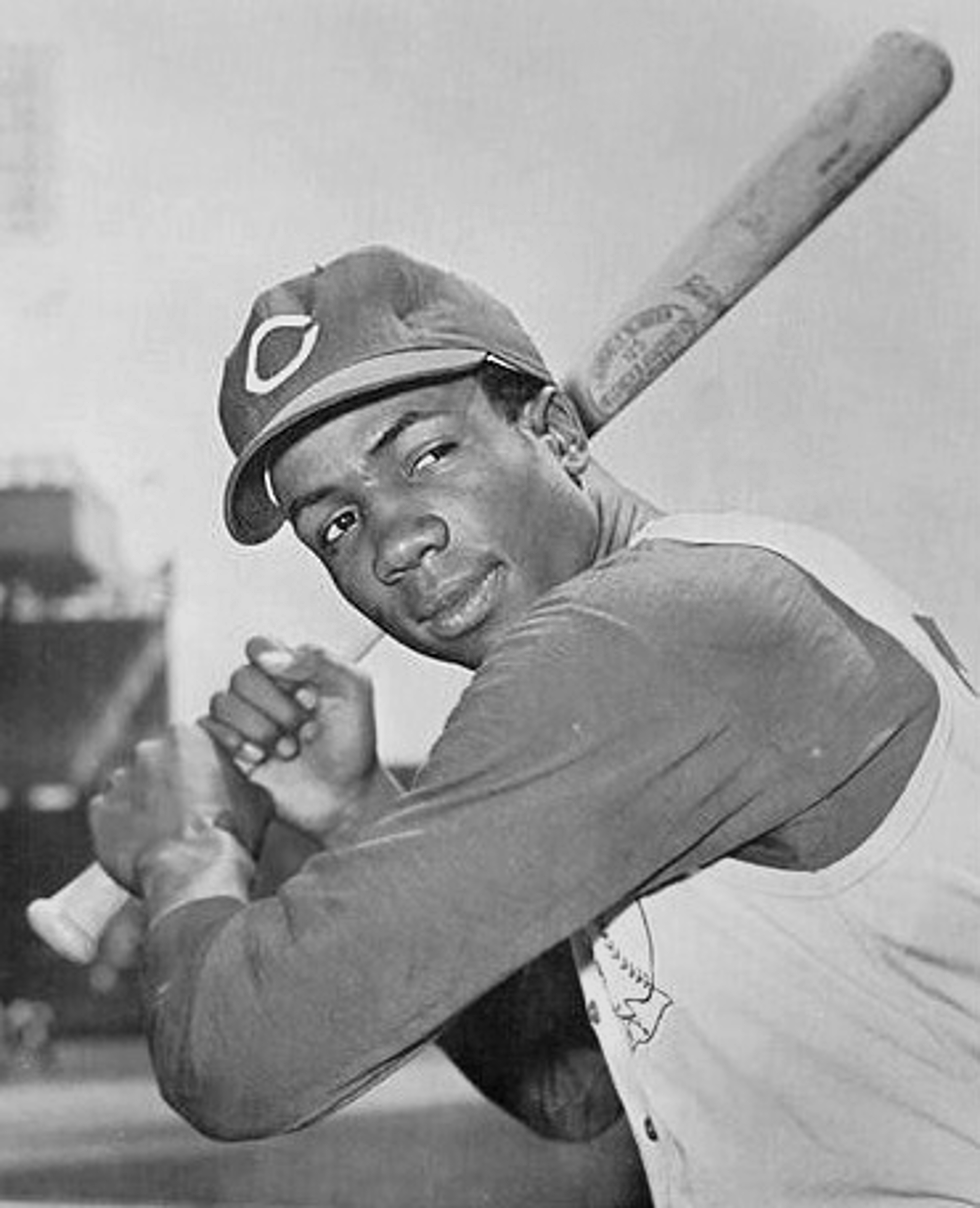
Frank Robinson

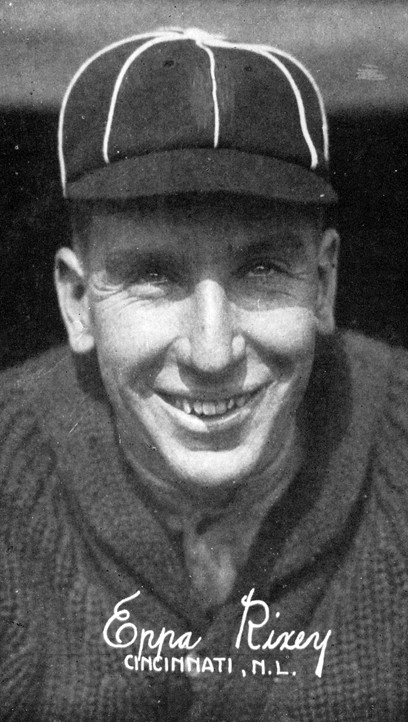
Eppa Rixey

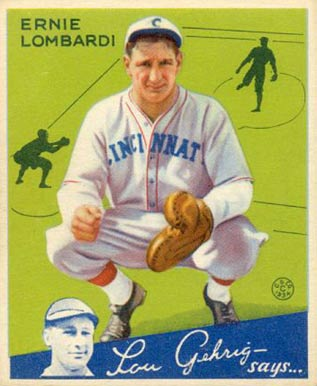
Ernie Lombardi

=== Team captains ===
- Tommy Corcoran – 1900–1905
- Joe Kelley – 1906
- John Ganzel – 1907
- Hans Lobert – 1909
- Mike Mitchell – 1910–1912
- Ivey Wingo – 1916
- Heinie Groh – 1918–1921
- Jake Daubert – 1922–1924
- Edd Roush – 1925–1926
- Bubbles Hargrave – 1927–1928
- 14 Pete Rose – 1970–1978
- 13 Dave Concepción – 1983–1988
- 11 Barry Larkin – 1997–2004

=== Retired numbers ===
The Cincinnati Reds have retired 10 numbers in franchise history, as well as honoring Jackie Robinson, whose number is retired league-wide in Major League Baseball.

All of the retired numbers are located at Great American Ball Park behind home plate on the outside of the press box. Along with the retired players' and managers' number, the following broadcasters are honored with microphones by the broadcast booth: Marty Brennaman, Waite Hoyt and Joe Nuxhall.

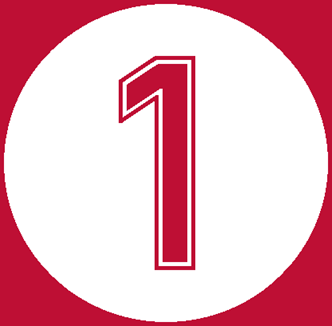
Fred
Hutchinson
Mgr
Retired October 19, 1964
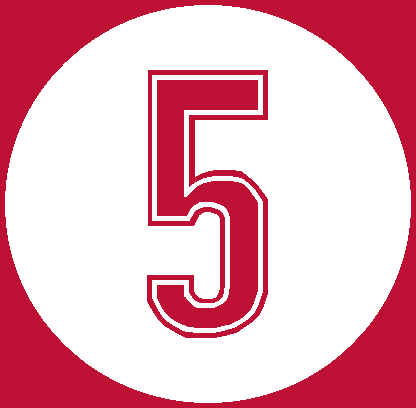
Johnny
Bench
C
Retired August 11, 1984
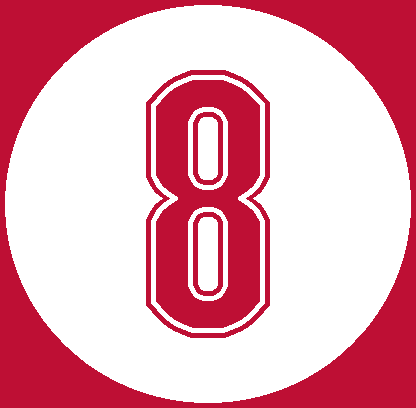
Joe
Morgan
2B
Retired June 6, 1998
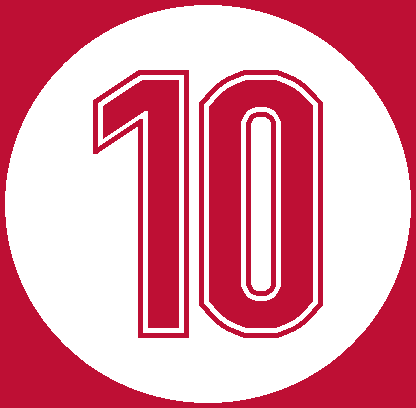
Sparky
Anderson
Mgr
Retired May 28, 2005
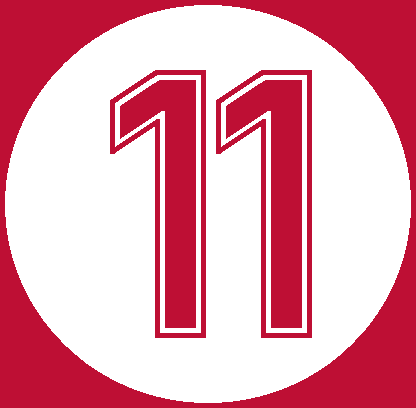
Barry
Larkin
SS
Retired August 25, 2012
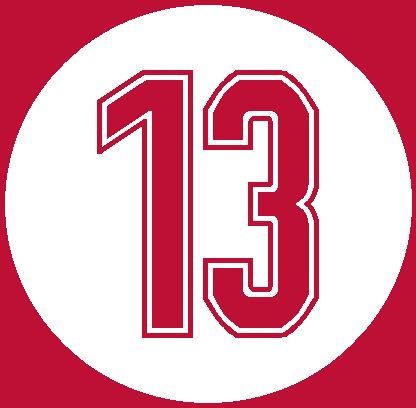
Dave
Concepción
SS
Retired August 25, 2007
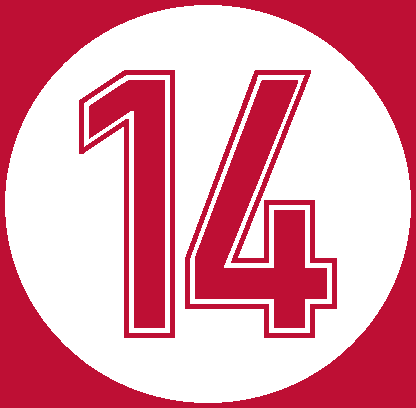
Pete
Rose
OF, IF, Mgr
Retired June 26, 2016
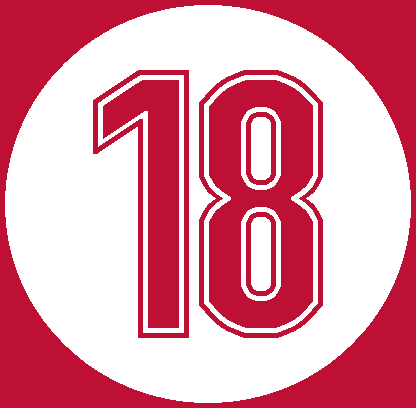
Ted
Kluszewski
1B, Coach
Retired July 18, 1998
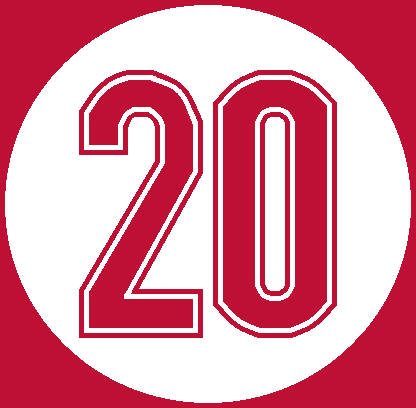
Frank
Robinson
OF
Retired May 22, 1998
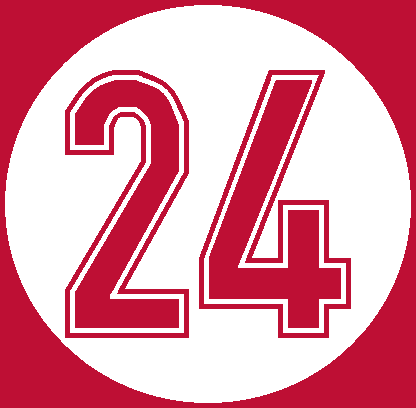
Tony
Pérez
1B, Mgr
Retired May 27, 2000
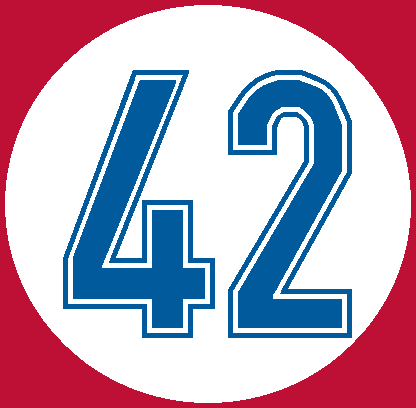
Jackie
Robinson
–
Honored April 15, 1997

On April 15, 1997, No. 42 was retired throughout Major League Baseball in honor of Jackie Robinson.

=== Baseball Hall of Famers ===
Cincinnati Reds Hall of Famers
Affiliation according to the National Baseball Hall of Fame and Museum

**Sparky Anderson**
Jake Beckley
**Johnny Bench** *
Jim Bottomley
Mordecai Brown
Charles Comiskey
Sam Crawford
Kiki Cuyler
Leo Durocher

Buck Ewing
Warren Giles *
Ken Griffey Jr.
Clark Griffith
Chick Hafey
Jesse Haines
Ned Hanlon
Harry Heilmann
Rogers Hornsby

Miller Huggins
Joe Kelley
George Kelly
**Barry Larkin** *
**Ernie Lombardi** *
Rube Marquard
Christy Mathewson
**Bill McKechnie** *
**Bid McPhee** *

**Joe Morgan** *
Hank O'Day
Dave Parker
**Tony Pérez** *
Charles Radbourn
**Eppa Rixey** *
Frank Robinson *
Scott Rolen
**Edd Roush** *

Amos Rusie
Tom Seaver
Al Simmons
Lee Smith
Joe Tinker
Dazzy Vance
Lloyd Waner
Bobby Wallace

- Players and managers listed in **bold** are depicted on their Hall of Fame plaques wearing a Reds cap insignia.
- *Cincinnati Reds listed as primary team, according to the Hall of Fame

=== Ford C. Frick Award recipients ===
Cincinnati Reds Ford C. Frick Award recipients
Affiliation according to the National Baseball Hall of Fame and Museum

Red Barber

**Marty Brennaman**

Al Helfer

Russ Hodges

Al Michaels

- **Names in bold** received the award based primarily on their work as broadcasters for the Reds.

== MLB All-Star Games ==
The Reds have hosted the Major League Baseball All-Star Game five times: twice at Crosley Field (1938, 1953), twice at Riverfront Stadium (1970, 1988) and once at Great American Ball Park (2015).

== Rivalries ==
=== Cleveland Guardians ===
The Ohio Cup trophy

First introduced in 1989, the Ohio Cup was an annual pre-season baseball game, which pitted the Ohio rivals Cleveland Guardians (Indians at the time) and Cincinnati Reds. In its first series it was a single-game cup, played each year at minor-league Cooper Stadium in Columbus, and was staged just days before the start of each new Major League Baseball season.

A total of eight Ohio Cup games were played, between 1989 and 1996, with the Indians winning six of them. The winner of the game each year was awarded the Ohio Cup in postgame ceremonies. The Ohio Cup was a favorite among baseball fans in Columbus, with attendances regularly topping 15,000.

The Ohio Cup games ended with the introduction of regular-season interleague play in 1997. Thereafter, the two teams competed annually in the regular-season Battle of Ohio or Buckeye Series. The Ohio Cup was revived in 2008 and now serves as a reward for the team with the better overall record in the Reds–Guardians series each year.

=== Pittsburgh Pirates ===
The Pirates-Reds rivalry at one point in time was one of the fiercest matchups in the National League during the 1970s; both teams often met in the postseason multiple times prior to both being realigned to the National League Central in 1993. The two teams date far into the infancy of MLB, having both been founded in the 1880s, and first met during the 1900 MLB season. Both teams combine for 10 World Series championships and 18 pennants. The Pirates and Reds met 5 times during the NLCS in 1970, 1972, 1975, 1979, and 1990. Most recently; both teams met again during the 2013 NL Wild Card Game.

As of 2023, the Pirates currently lead the rivalry 1141–1113, However; the Reds lead in postseason wins 13–8.

=== Los Angeles Dodgers ===
The Dodgers–Reds rivalry was one of the most intense during the 1970s through the early 1990s. They often competed for the NL West division title. From 1970 to 1990, they had eleven 1–2 finishes in the standings, with seven of them being within 5 1/2 games or fewer. Both teams also played in numerous championships during this span, combining to win 10 NL Pennants and 5 World Series titles from 1970–1990 Notably as the Big Red Machine teams clashed frequently with the Tommy Lasorda era Dodgers teams. Reds manager Sparky Anderson once said, "I don't think there's a rivalry like ours in either league. The Giants are supposed to be the Dodgers' natural rivals, but I don't think the feeling is there anymore. It's not there the way it is with us and the Dodgers." The rivalry ended when division realignment moved the Reds to the NL Central. However, they did face one another later on in both 1995 and 2025.

== Media ==
=== Radio ===
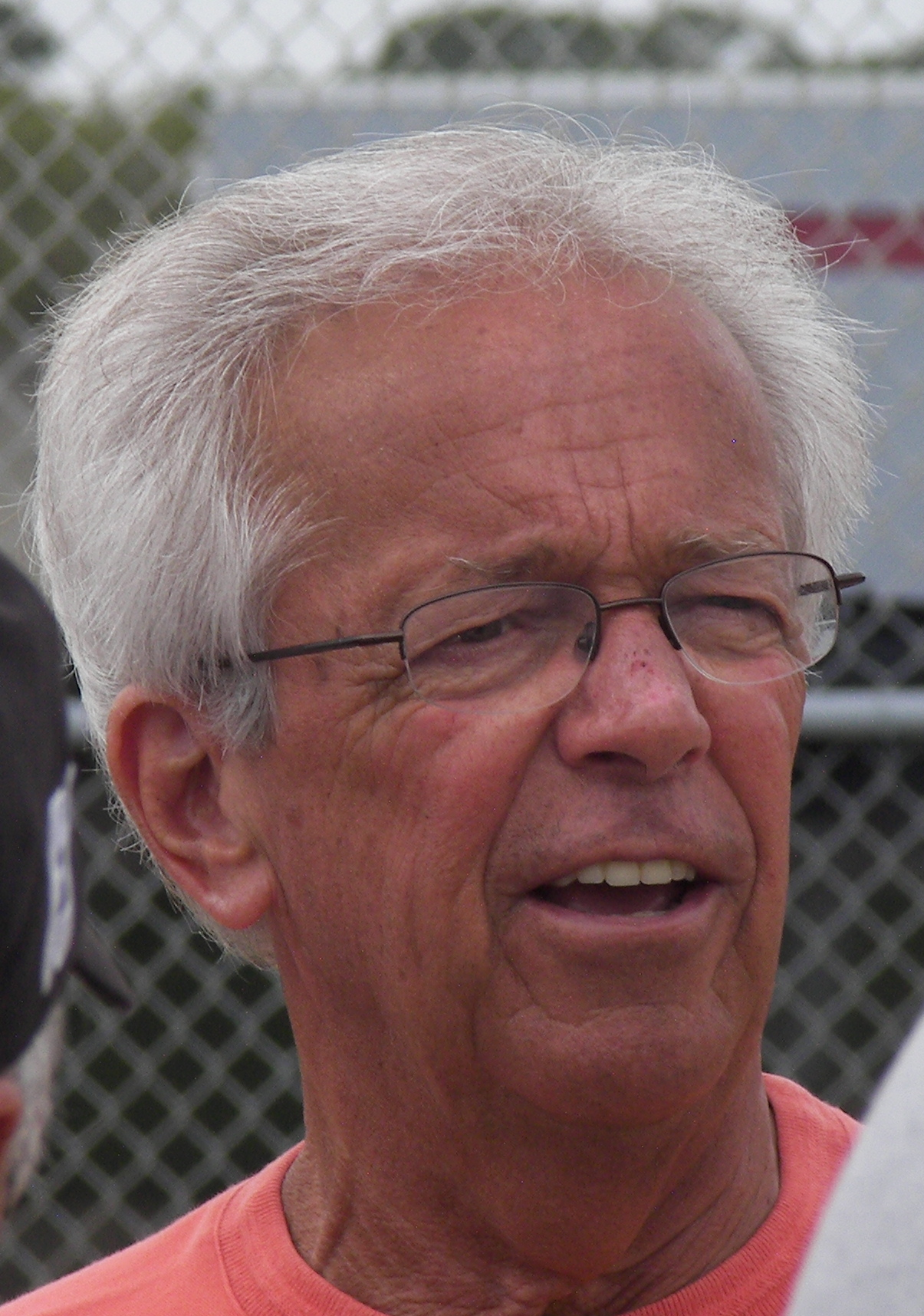
Marty Brennaman, the Hall of Fame "voice of the Reds"

The Reds' flagship radio station has been WLW, 700AM since 1969. Prior to that, the Reds were heard over WKRC, WCPO, WSAI and WCKY. WLW, a 50,000-watt station, is "clear channel" in more than one way, as iHeartMedia owns the "blowtorch" outlet, which is also known as "The Nation's Station." Reds games can be heard on over 100 local radio stations through the Reds on Radio Network.

Since 2020, the Reds broadcast team has been former Pensacola Blue Wahoos radio play-by-play announcer Tommy Thrall and retired relief pitcher Jeff Brantley on color commentary.

Marty Brennaman called Reds games from 1974 to 2019, most famously alongside former Reds pitcher and color commentator Joe Nuxhall through 2007. Brennaman has won the Ford C. Frick Award for his work, which includes his famous call of "... and this one belongs to the Reds!" after a win. Nuxhall preceded Brennaman in the Reds' booth, beginning in 1967 (the year after his retirement as an active player) until his death in 2007. (From 2004 to 2007, Nuxhall only called select home games.)

In 2007, Thom Brennaman, a veteran announcer seen nationwide on Fox Sports, joined his father Marty in the radio booth. Brantley, formerly of ESPN, also joined the network in 2007. Three years later in 2010, Brantley and Thom Brennaman's increased TV schedule led to more appearances for Jim Kelch, who had filled in on the network since 2008. Kelch's contract expired after the 2017 season.

In 2019, Thrall was brought in to provide in-game and post-game coverage, as well as act as a fill-in play-by-play announcer. He succeeded Marty Brennaman when the former retired at the end of the 2019 season.

=== Television ===
Televised games that are not picked up by one of Major League Baseball's national broadcasters air exclusively on FanDuel Sports Network Ohio and FanDuel Sports Network Indiana. In addition, FanDuel Sports Network South televises Bally Sports Ohio broadcasts of Reds games to Tennessee and western North Carolina. George Grande, who hosted the first SportsCenter on ESPN in 1979, was the play-by-play announcer, usually alongside Chris Welsh, from 1993 until his retirement during the final game of the 2009 season. Since 2009, Grande has worked part time for the Reds as play-by-play announcer in September when Thom Brennaman is covering the NFL for Fox Sports. He has also made guest appearances throughout each season. Brennaman had been the head play-by-play commentator since 2010, with Welsh and Brantley sharing time as the color commentators. Cincinnati native Paul Keels, who left in 2011 to devote more time to his full-time job as the play-by-play announcer for the Ohio State Buckeyes Radio Network, was the Reds' backup play-by-play television announcer during the 2010 season. Jim Kelch served as Keels' replacement. The Reds also added former Reds first baseman Sean Casey – known as "The Mayor" by Reds fans – to do color commentary for approximately 15 games in 2011.

MLB's local media division announced that it would take over the television rights to the Reds in November 2024, with the first telecasts in the 2025 season. The games would be distributed via cable and satellite providers and a direct-to-consumer service. However, the team would later return to the FanDuel Sports Networks in January 2025, under similar distribution agreements earlier reached with MLB. From 2026 onward, the Reds joined MLB Local Media under the Reds.TV production and distribution arm.

NBC affiliate WLWT carried Reds games from 1948 to 1995. Among those that have called games for WLWT include Waite Hoyt, Ray Lane, Steve Physioc, Johnny Bench, Joe Morgan and Ken Wilson. Al Michaels, who established a long career with ABC and NBC, spent three years in Cincinnati early in his career. The last regularly scheduled, over-the-air broadcasts of Reds games were on WSTR-TV from 1996 to 1998. From 2010 to 2023, WKRC-TV has simulcast Opening Day games with Fox/Bally Sports Ohio, which it came into common ownership with in 2019. The simulcasts returned to WLWT beginning in 2024.

On August 19, 2020, Thom Brennaman was caught uttering a homophobic slur during a game against the Kansas City Royals. Brennaman eventually apologized for the incident and was suspended, but on September 26, he resigned from his duties as the Reds' TV play-by-play announcer. This ended the Brennamans' 46-year association with the Reds franchise, dating back to Marty's first season in 1974. Sideline reporter Jim Day served as the interim play-by-play voice for the remainder of the 2020 season, after which the Reds hired John Sadak to serve as its television play-by-play announcer.

== Community involvement ==
The Reds Community Fund, founded in 2001, is focused on the youth of the Greater Cincinnati area with the goal of improving the lives of participants by leveraging the traditions of the Reds. The fund sponsors the Reviving Baseball in Inner Cities (RBI) program with a goal of 30–50 young people graduating high school and attending college annually. It also holds an annual telethon, raising in excess of $120,000. An example of the fund's community involvement is its renovation of Hoffman Fields in the Evanston neighborhood of the city, upgrading the entire recreation complex, for a total of over 400 baseball diamonds renovated at 200 locations throughout the region.

During the COVID-19 pandemic in 2020, since no spectators were allowed at MLB games, the Reds offered fans the opportunity to purchase paper cutouts of their own photographs in the stands at Great American Ball Park. The promotion raised over $300,000 for the fund, more than the fund's traditional events such as Redsfest, the Redlegs Run, an annual golf outing and the Fox Sports Ohio Telethon.

== Roster ==
Cincinnati Reds 2027 spring training roster
40-man roster		Non-roster invitees	Coaches / other
Pitchers: 41 Andrew Abbott; 70 Tejay Antone; 23 Graham Ashcraft; 26 Chase Burns; -- Duncan Davitt; 74 José Franco; 57 Julian Garcia; 21 Hunter Greene; 40 Nick Lodolo; 25 Rhett Lowder; 78 Zach Maxwell; 62 Zach McCambley; 47 Luis Mey; 61 Chase Petty; 34 Connor Phillips; 64 Tony Santillan; -- Paxton Schultz; -- Chase Solesky; 68 Carson Spiers; 55 Brandon Williamson	Catchers: 60 Will Banfield; 35 Jose Trevino; Infielders: 2 Edwin Arroyo; 85 Leo Balcazar; 46 Juan Brito; 16 Oswaldo Cabrera; 44 Elly De La Cruz; 3 Ke'Bryan Hayes; 9 Matt McLain; 7 Spencer Steer; 27 Sal Stewart; Outfielders: 22 JJ Bleday; 59 Blake Dunn; 38 Carlos Jorge; 4 Noelvi Marte; 17 Dane Myers; 43 Héctor Rodríguez		Manager: 77 Terry Francona; Coaches: 92 Kyle Arnsberg (assistant coach); 45 Freddie Benavides (bench coach/field coordinator); 54 Collin Cowgill (first base); 91 Jose Duarte (bullpen catcher); 99 Willie Harris (third base); 95 James Keller (bullpen catcher); 96 Simon Mathews (assistant pitching); 75 Mike Napoli (staff assistant); 93 Alex Pelaez (assistant hitting); 94 Will Remillard (assistant hitting); 90 Matt Tracy (bullpen); 76 Chris Valaika (hitting); 37 active, 0 inactive, 0 non-roster invitees; 7-, 10-, or 15-day injured list; * Not on active roster; ^{†} Suspended list; Roster, coaches, and NRIs updated November 2, 2026; Transactions • Depth chart; → All MLB rosters

== Minor league affiliations ==
The Cincinnati Reds farm system consists of seven minor league affiliates.

Class	Team	League	Location	Ballpark	Affiliated
Triple-A	Louisville Bats	International League	Louisville, Kentucky	Louisville Slugger Field	2000
Double-A	Chattanooga Lookouts	Southern League	Chattanooga, Tennessee	Erlanger Park	1988
High-A	Dayton Dragons	Midwest League	Dayton, Ohio	Day Air Ballpark	2000
Single-A	Daytona Tortugas	Florida State League	Daytona Beach, Florida	Jackie Robinson Ballpark	2015
Rookie	ACL Reds	Arizona Complex League	Goodyear, Arizona	Goodyear Ballpark	1999
Rookie	DSL Reds	Dominican Summer League	Boca Chica, Santo Domingo	Baseball City Complex	1998
Rookie	DSL Rojos	Dominican Summer League	Boca Chica, Santo Domingo	Baseball City Complex	2024

== Notes ==
Awards and achievements
Preceded by Boston Red Sox; 1918	World Series champions 1919	Succeeded by Cleveland Indians; 1920
Preceded by New York Yankees; 1936–1939	World Series champions 1940	Succeeded by New York Yankees; 1941–1943
Preceded by Oakland Athletics; 1972–1974	World Series champions 1975–1976	Succeeded by New York Yankees; 1977–1978
Preceded by Oakland Athletics; 1989	World Series champions 1990	Succeeded by Minnesota Twins; 1991
Preceded by Chicago Cubs; 1918	National League champions 1919	Succeeded by Brooklyn Dodgers; 1920
Preceded by Chicago Cubs; 1938	National League champions 1939–1940	Succeeded by Brooklyn Dodgers; 1941
Preceded by Pittsburgh Pirates; 1960	National League champions 1961	Succeeded by San Francisco Giants; 1962
Preceded by New York Mets; 1969	National League champions 1970	Succeeded by Pittsburgh Pirates; 1971
Preceded by Pittsburgh Pirates; 1971	National League champions 1972	Succeeded by New York Mets; 1973
Preceded by Los Angeles Dodgers; 1974	National League champions 1975–1976	Succeeded by Los Angeles Dodgers; 1977–1978
Preceded by San Francisco Giants; 1989	National League champions 1990	Succeeded by Atlanta Braves; 1991–1992
Preceded by None (first season)	American Association champions Cincinnati Red Stockings; 1882	Succeeded by Philadelphia Athletics; 1883
