= Rosie Reds =

American philanthropic and social organization

The Rosie Reds, also known as Rosie Reds, Inc., is a philanthropic and social organization focused on the Cincinnati Reds. The organization was founded by a group of local Cincinnati women in June 1964 in response to the Reds' then-owner Bill DeWitt's proposal to move the team to San Diego. The group was formed by local residents Jeanette Heinze, Marge Zimmer, Ketty Kennedy, and Kate McIntyre, who had initially taken part in a committee formed by the Greater Cincinnati Chamber of Commerce to discuss ways to prevent the team's move.

The women decided that one of the ways to prevent the move was to show support for the team by showing up for games, both at home and on the road, which ended up being influential in the decision to keep the team in Cincinnati. Management for the Cincinnati Reds responded to the Rosie Reds by donating tickets to club members, sending speakers to club events, and promoting the Rosie Reds during games. This boosted interest in membership and in 1971, during the days of The Big Red Machine, many men began requesting to join the Rosie Reds. In 2004 Tom Juengling became the president of the Rosie Reds, a position that had traditionally been held by a female member. Juengling held the position until 2006. In 2014 the Rosie Reds were honored with an exhibit in the Cincinnati Reds Hall of Fame and Museum.

The name "Rosie" is an acronym for "Rooters Organized to Stimulate Interest and Enthusiasm in the Cincinnati Reds". The organization annually awards baseball endowments or scholarships, along with an award of $2,500 to the Powel Crosley Junior - Kid Glove Association. The Rosie Reds also support the Annual Kid Glove games held at Great American Ball Park. The organization's mascot, named Rosie Reds, is a female anthropomorphic baseball wearing a Cincinnati Reds uniform and a large bow tie. She was designed by Cincinnati Post cartoonist Clarence Wiese.
