= Brad Meador =

American baseball coach and scout (born 1975)

Cincinnati Reds
- Senior vice president / General manager
- Born: February 24, 1975 (age 51)

Teams
- Cincinnati Reds (2023–present)

Brad W. Meador (born February 24, 1975) is an American baseball executive and former coach, who currently serves as the Senior Vice President and General Manager of the Cincinnati Reds of Major League Baseball (MLB).

Meador first started his college career as a football player at Southwestern Oklahoma State, the following year, he transferred to Oklahoma State University where he finished his degree.

Meador was an assistant coach for the New Mexico State Aggies baseball team for two years, then joined the Cincinnati Bearcats baseball team as an assistant and later associate coach under head coach Brian Cleary for ten years.

Meador began scouting for the Cincinnati Reds of Major League Baseball in September 2009, starting out as an area supervisor. He became the Midwest crosschecker in 2016, and was promoted to director of amateur scouting in August 2018. Meador was promoted to vice president and assistant general manager responsible for scouting and player development in 2021, before being named general manager in September 2023.
