= 2025 Cincinnati Reds season =

2025 Cincinnati Reds
- National League Wild Card
- League: National League
- Division: Central
- Ballpark: Great American Ball Park
- City: Cincinnati
- Record: 83–79 (.512)
- Divisional place: 3rd
- Owners: Bob Castellini
- General managers: Nick Krall
- Managers: Terry Francona
- Television: FanDuel Sports Network Ohio
- Radio: WLW (700 AM); Reds Radio Network
- Stats: ESPN.com; Baseball Reference

The 2025 Cincinnati Reds season was the 156th season for the franchise in Major League Baseball, and their 23rd at Great American Ball Park in Cincinnati.

On September 28, the Reds clinched a postseason berth for the first time since 2020, and for the first time in a full season since 2013, as the sixth seed Wild Card team in the National League with the New York Mets' loss to the Miami Marlins. This made them the third team since 2000 to ever make the MLB playoffs with 83 or fewer wins and they were also the first team to qualify for the postseason with no .270 batting average or 25 home runs hitter. They lost in a two-game sweep to the defending and eventual repeat World Series champion Los Angeles Dodgers in the Wild Card Series.

The Cincinnati Reds drew an average home attendance of 26,967, the 20th-highest of all MLB teams.

== Off-season ==
=== New manager ===
On October 4, 2024, the Reds hired Terry Francona as their manager, announcing that they agreed on a three-year contract with a club option for the 2028 season.

Francona joins the Reds and has a lifetime record of 1950–1672 over a 23-year career. Francona managed with the Philadelphia Phillies from 1997–2000, the Boston Red Sox from 2004–2011 and the Cleveland Indians / Guardians from 2013–2023. He led the Red Sox to two World Series titles, winning in 2004 and 2007. Francona is also the winningest manager in Cleveland history, earning a record of 921–757 with six post-season appearances in 11 years. He won the American League Manager of the Year award in 2013, 2016 and 2022 with the Indians/Guardians.

Francona also had a 10-year playing career and played the 1987 season with the Reds. In 102 games with Cincinnati, Francona hit .227 with three home runs and 12 RBI in 102 games. In his career, he batted .274 with 16 home runs and 143 RBI and in addition to playing with the Reds, Francona played with the Montreal Expos, Chicago Cubs, Cleveland Indians and Milwaukee Brewers.

=== Uniform Modifications ===
On February 10th, the Reds announced that they would add #14 patches to their uniforms throughout the entire season as a way to honor the late Pete Rose, a Cincinnati native who played for 19 seasons with the Reds. Rose died on September 30th, 2024 at the age of 83.

=== Transactions ===
==== October 2024 ====
October 1	Activated 3B Jeimer Candelario from the 10-day injured list. Activated LHP Nick Lodolo from the 15-day injured list. Activated LHP Sam Moll from the 15-day injured list. Activated LHP Andrew Abbott from the 15-day injured list. Activated RHP Julian Aguiar from the 15-day injured list. Recalled LF Joey Wiemer from Louisville Bats. Recalled LHP Brandon Leibrandt from Louisville Bats. Recalled RHP Connor Phillips from Louisville Bats. Recalled RF Nick Martini from ACL Reds. Recalled RHP Casey Legumina from Louisville Bats. Recalled LF Jacob Hurtubise from Louisville Bats. Recalled RHP Lyon Richardson from Louisville Bats.
October 17	Signed free agent RHP Trevor Kuncl from Lancaster Stormers of Atlantic League to a minor league contract.
October 28	Activated SS Matt McLain. Activated 1B Christian Encarnacion-Strand. Designated LHP Brandon Leibrandt for assignment. Designated RF Amed Rosario for assignment.
October 30	Sent LHP Brandon Leibrandt outright to Louisville Bats.
October 31	RHP Buck Farmer elected free agency - (signed a minor league contract with the Atlanta Braves on February 16). LHP Justin Wilson elected free agency (signed a one-year, $2.25 million contract with the Boston Red Sox on November 14). RF Amed Rosario elected free agency - (signed a one-year, $2 million contract with the Washington Nationals on January 8.

==== November 2024 ====
November 1	RHP Nick Martinez elected free agency - (accepted qualifying offer of one-year, $21.05 million with the Reds). C Luke Maile elected free agency - (signed a minor league contract with the Kansas City Royals on February 16). RHP Jakob Junis elected free agency - (signed a one-year, $4.5 million contract with the Cleveland Guardians). LHP Brent Suter elected free agency - (re-signed to a one-year, $2.5 million contract on November 6). RHP Christian Roa claimed by Miami Marlins off of waivers. Activated C Austin Wynns from the 60-day injured list. Activated RHP Tejay Antone from the 60-day injured list. Sent C Austin Wynns outright to Louisville Bats. Sent RHP Tejay Antone outright to Louisville Bats. Sent 1B Ty France outright to Louisville Bats. Sent RF Nick Martini outright to Louisville Bats.
November 4	Activated LHP Brandon Williamson from the 60-day injured list. Activated RHP Graham Ashcraft from the 60-day injured list. Activated CF Stuart Fairchild from the 60-day injured list.
November 6	Re-signed free agent LHP Brent Suter to a one-year, $2.5 million contract.
November 8	Signed free agent C Alex Jackson from the Tampa Bay Rays to a minor league contract.
November 19	Re-signed RHP Nick Martinez to a one-year, $21.05 million contract. Selected the contract of RHP Luis Mey from Chattanooga Lookouts. Selected the contract of 2B Tyler Callihan from Louisville Bats.
November 22	Traded 2B Jonathan India and LF Joey Wiemer to the Kansas City Royals for RHP Brady Singer. RHP Ian Gibaut elected free agency - (re-signed to a minor league contract on January 29). Signed free agent C Will Banfield from the Miami Marlins to a minor league contract.

==== December 2024 ====
December 6	Signed free agent RHP Lenny Torres Jr. from the Cleveland Guardians to a minor league contract.
December 11	Purchased contract of 2B Cooper Bowman from the Athletics in 2024 Rule 5 Draft.
December 19	Claimed RHP Roansy Contreras off waivers from the Texas Rangers.
December 20	Traded RHP Fernando Cruz and C Alex Jackson to the New York Yankees for C Jose Trevino.
December 24	Signed free agent RHP Drew Parrish from the Atlanta Braves to a minor league contract.

==== January 2025 ====
January 4	Signed free agent RHP Bryan Shaw from the Los Angeles Angels to a minor league contract.
January 6	Traded cash to the Texas Rangers for RHP Owen White. Designated RHP Roansy Contreras for assignment.
January 7	Traded CF Mike Sirota and a Competitive Balance Round A pick to the Los Angeles Dodgers for 2B Gavin Lux.
January 9	Re-signed free agent CF Levi Jordan to a minor league contract.
January 10	RHP Roansy Contreras claimed off waivers by the Baltimore Orioles.
January 13	Re-signed free agent C Austin Wynns to a minor league contract.
January 15	Signed international free agent OF Rey Reyes to a minor league contract. Signed international free agent SS Omar Guadamuz to a minor league contract. Signed international free agent OF Wanderly De La Cruz to a minor league contract. Signed international free agent C Abel Pena to a minor league contract. Signed international free agent RHP Ramces Carmargo to a minor league contract. Signed international free agent SS Deinis Chourio to a minor league contract. Signed international free agent SS Jealmy Frias to a minor league contract. Signed international free agent RHP Cesar Maiz to a minor league contract. Signed international free agent RHP Irvin Machuca to a minor league contract. Signed international free agent SS Sandor Feliciano to a minor league contract. Signed international free agent C Enry Torres to a minor league contract. Signed international free agent RHP Oscar Ramirez to a minor league contract. Signed international free agent OF Diego Munoz to a minor league contract. Signed international free agent SS Angel Salio to a minor league contract. Signed international free agent RHP Starlin Alberto to a minor league contract. Signed international free agent OF Isaac Garcia to a minor league contract. Signed international free agent OF Jose Martinez to a minor league contract.
January 17	Traded future considerations to the Los Angeles Dodgers for OF Arnaldo Lantigua. Signed free agent LHP Alex Young from the New York Mets to a minor league contract.
January 20	Signed free agent C Andy Yerzy from the Milwaukee Brewers to a minor league contract.
January 27	Signed free agent RHP Aaron Wilkerson from the Lotte Giants of the KBO League to a minor league contract.
January 28	Re-signed free agent C P.J. Higgins to a minor league contract.
January 29	Traded RHP Braxton Roxby to the San Francisco Giants for LHP Taylor Rogers and cash. Designated RHP Owen White for assignment.
January 30	Signed free agent LF Austin Hays from the Philadelphia Phillies to a one-year, $5 million contract. Designated RHP Casey Legumina for assignment.

==== February 2025 ====
February 1	Re-signed free agent 1B Edwin Ríos to a minor league contract.
February 3	Traded RHP Casey Legumina to the Seattle Mariners for cash.
February 4	Re-signed free agent RHP Ian Gibaut to a minor league contract and invited him to spring training. Signed free agent LHP Wade Miley from the Milwaukee Brewers to a minor league contract and invited him to spring training. Signed free agent LHP Joe La Sorsa from the Washington Nationals to a minor league contract and invited him to spring training.
February 5	RHP Owen White claimed off waivers by the New York Yankees.
February 6	Signed free agent RHP Albert Abreu from the Saitama Seibu Lions of NPB to a minor league contract and invited him to spring training.
February 11	Signed free agent RHP Josh Staumont from the Chicago Cubs to a minor league contract and invited him to spring training.
February 13	Signed free agent RHP Scott Barlow from the Cleveland Guardians to a one-year, $1.5 million contract. Placed RHP Julian Aguiar (UCL surgery on right elbow) on the 60-day injured list.

==== March 2025 ====
March 9	Optioned RHP Luis Mey to the Louisville Bats.
March 10	Optioned 3B Noelvi Marte to the Louisville Bats. Optioned RHP Connor Phillips to the Louisville Bats. Optioned 2B Tyler Callihan to the Louisville Bats. Optioned RHP Yosver Zulueta to the Louisville Bats. Optioned RF Rece Hinds to the Louisville Bats.
March 12	Returned 2B Cooper Bowman to the Athletics.
March 15	Optioned LF Will Benson to the Louisville Bats.
March 20	Optioned RHP Lyon Richardson to the Louisville Bats.
March 24	Signed international free agent RHP Guillermo Baldelomar to a minor league contract.
March 25	RHP Lyon Richardson assigned to the Reds. Selected the contract of RHP Ian Gibaut from the Louisville Bats.
March 26	Placed C Tyler Stephenson (left oblique strain) on the 10-day injured list retroactive to March 24. Placed LF Austin Hays (left calf strain) on the 10-day injured list retroactive to March 24. Placed RHP Rhett Lowder (right forearm strain) on the 15-day injured list retroactive to March 24. Placed RHP Alexis Díaz (left hamstring strain) on the 15-day injured list retroactive to March 24. Placed LHP Andrew Abbott (left shoulder rotator cuff strain) on the 15-day injured list retroactive to March 24. Placed LHP Brandon Williamson (left UCL reconstruction) on the 60-day injured list.

== Standings ==
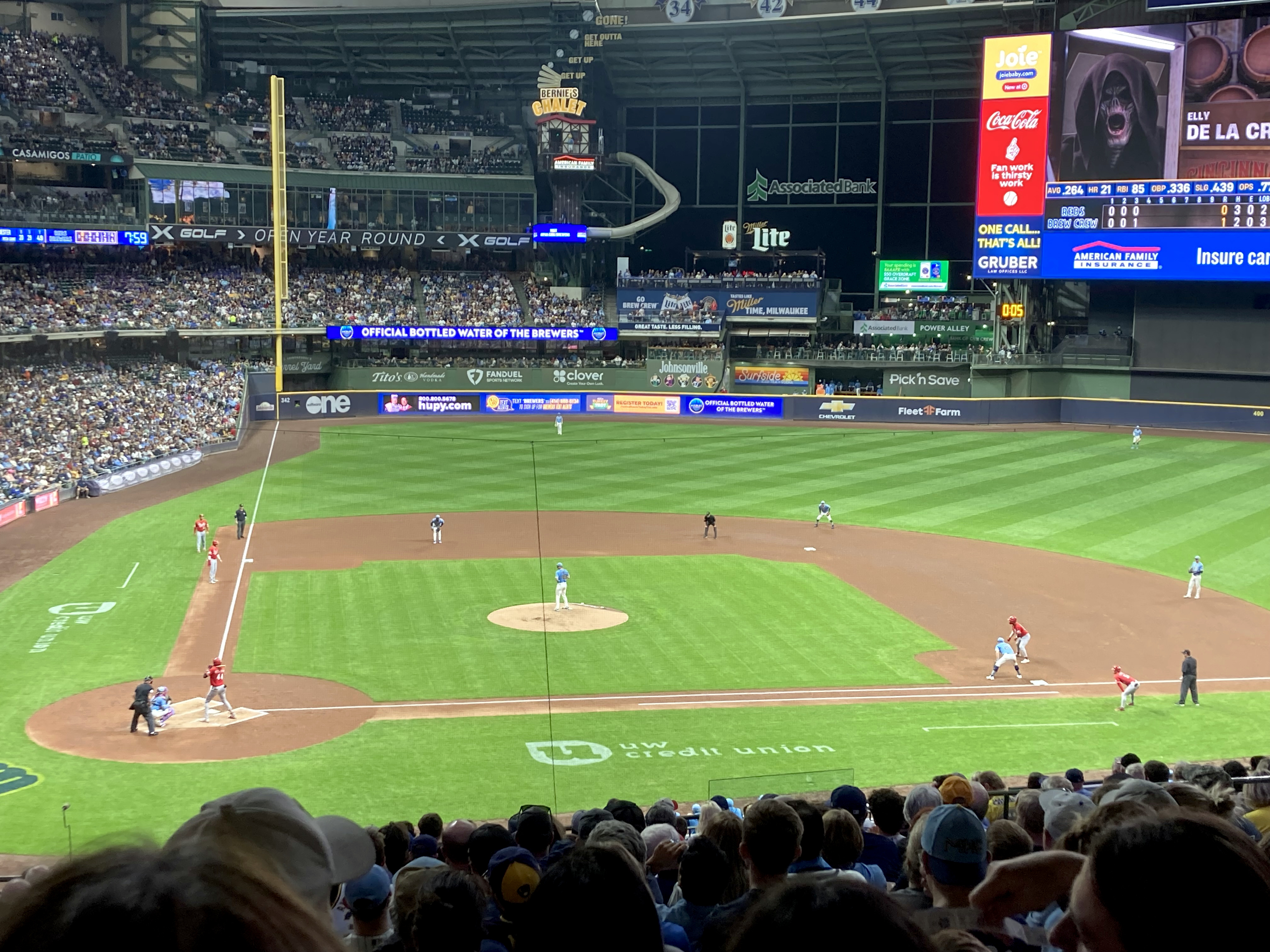
The Reds playing the Milwaukee Brewers on September 26

=== National League Central ===
NL Central
Team	W	L	Pct.	GB	Home	Road
Milwaukee Brewers	97	65	.599	—	52‍–‍29	45‍–‍36
Chicago Cubs	92	70	.568	5	50‍–‍31	42‍–‍39
Cincinnati Reds	83	79	.512	14	45‍–‍36	38‍–‍43
St. Louis Cardinals	78	84	.481	19	44‍–‍37	34‍–‍47
Pittsburgh Pirates	71	91	.438	26	44‍–‍37	27‍–‍54

=== National League Wild Card ===
Division leaders
Team	W	L	Pct.
Milwaukee Brewers	97	65	.599
Philadelphia Phillies	96	66	.593
Los Angeles Dodgers	93	69	.574

Wild Card teams (Top 3 teams qualify for postseason)
Team	W	L	Pct.	GB
Chicago Cubs	92	70	.568	+9
San Diego Padres	90	72	.556	+7
Cincinnati Reds	83	79	.512	—
New York Mets	83	79	.512	—
San Francisco Giants	81	81	.500	2
Arizona Diamondbacks	80	82	.494	3
Miami Marlins	79	83	.488	4
St. Louis Cardinals	78	84	.481	5
Atlanta Braves	76	86	.469	7
Pittsburgh Pirates	71	91	.438	12
Washington Nationals	66	96	.407	17
Colorado Rockies	43	119	.265	40

=== Record vs. opponents ===
==== Record vs. National League ====
2025 National League record Source: MLB Standings Grid – 2025
Team	AZ	ATL	CHC	CIN	COL	LAD	MIA	MIL	NYM	PHI	PIT	SD	SF	STL	WSH	AL
Arizona	—	4–2	3–4	2–4	8–5	6–7	3–3	4–3	3–3	3–3	2–4	5–8	7–6	3–3	2–4	25–23
Atlanta	2–4	—	2–4	5–2	4–2	1–5	8–5	2–4	8–5	5–8	2–4	1–6	1–5	4–2	9–4	22–26
Chicago	4–3	4–2	—	5–8	5–1	4–3	4–2	7–6	2–4	2–4	10–3	3–3	1–5	8–5	3–3	30–18
Cincinnati	4–2	2–5	8–5	—	5–1	1–5	3–4	5–8	4–2	3–3	7–6	4–2	3–3	6–7	2–4	26–22
Colorado	5–8	2–4	1–5	1–5	—	2–11	3–3	2–4	0–6	0–7	2–4	3–10	2–11	4–2	4–3	12–36
Los Angeles	7–6	5–1	3–4	5–1	11–2	—	5–1	0–6	3–4	2–4	2–4	9–4	9–4	2–4	3–3	27–21
Miami	3–3	5–8	2–4	4–3	3–3	1–5	—	3–3	7–6	4–9	4–3	3–3	4–2	3–3	7–6	26–22
Milwaukee	3–4	4–2	6–7	8–5	4–2	6–0	3–3	—	4–2	4–2	10–3	2–4	2–5	7–6	6–0	28–20
New York	3–3	5–8	4–2	2–4	6–0	4–3	6–7	2–4	—	7–6	2–4	2–4	4–2	5–2	7–6	24–24
Philadelphia	3–3	8–5	4–2	3–3	7–0	4–2	9–4	2–4	6–7	—	3–3	3–3	3–4	2–4	8–5	31–17
Pittsburgh	4–2	4–2	3–10	6–7	4–2	4–2	3–4	3–10	4–2	3–3	—	1–5	4–2	7–6	4–3	17–31
San Diego	8–5	6–1	3–3	2–4	10–3	4–9	3–3	4–2	4–2	3–3	5–1	—	10–3	4–3	4–2	20–28
San Francisco	6–7	5–1	5–1	3–3	11–2	4–9	2–4	5–2	2–4	4–3	2–4	3–10	—	2–4	3–3	24–24
St. Louis	3–3	2–4	5–8	7–6	2–4	4–2	3–3	6–7	2–5	4–2	6–7	3–4	4–2	—	5–1	22–26
Washington	4–2	4–9	3–3	4–2	3–4	3–3	6–7	0–6	6–7	5–8	3–4	2–4	3–3	1–5	—	19–29

Updated with the results of all games through September 28, 2025.

==== Record vs. American League ====
2025 National League record vs. American League Source: MLB Standings
Team	ATH	BAL	BOS	CWS	CLE	DET	HOU	KC	LAA	MIN	NYY	SEA	TB	TEX	TOR
Arizona	2–1	2–1	2–1	2–1	2–1	0–3	0–3	1–2	1–2	2–1	2–1	3–0	1–2	4–2	1–2
Atlanta	1–2	0–3	3–3	2–1	3–0	3–0	1–2	1–2	1–2	3–0	1–2	1–2	1–2	0–3	1–2
Chicago	3–0	2–1	2–1	5–1	3–0	1–2	1–2	1–2	3–0	1–2	2–1	1–2	2–1	2–1	1–2
Cincinnati	0–3	2–1	1–2	1–2	5–1	2–1	1–2	2–1	2–1	2–1	2–1	1–2	3–0	1–2	1–2
Colorado	1–2	1–2	0–3	1–2	1–2	0–3	2–4	0–3	2–1	2–1	1–2	0–3	1–2	0–3	0–3
Los Angeles	2–1	1–2	1–2	3–0	2–1	3–0	0–3	2–1	0–6	2–1	2–1	3–0	2–1	2–1	2–1
Miami	1–2	2–1	1–2	1–2	1–2	2–1	1–2	2–1	2–1	2–1	3–0	1–2	3–3	3–0	1–2
Milwaukee	2–1	2–1	3–0	2–1	1–2	2–1	2–1	2–1	3–0	4–2	0–3	2–1	1–2	0–3	2–1
New York	2–1	1–2	1–2	2–1	0–3	2–1	1–2	2–1	3–0	1–2	3–3	2–1	0–3	1–2	3–0
Philadelphia	2–1	2–1	2–1	1–2	2–1	2–1	0–3	2–1	1–2	2–1	2–1	3–0	3–0	3–0	4–2
Pittsburgh	2–1	0–3	2–1	0–3	0–3	4–2	1–2	0–3	2–1	1–2	1–2	0–3	1–2	1–2	2–1
San Diego	2–1	0–3	2–1	2–1	3–0	1–2	1–2	2–1	2–1	1–2	1–2	1–5	0–3	2–1	0–3
San Francisco	5–1	2–1	2–1	1–2	1–2	0–3	3–0	1–2	1–2	0–3	2–1	3–0	1–2	2–1	0–3
St. Louis	2–1	2–1	0–3	3–0	3–0	1–2	2–1	3–3	1–2	3–0	0–3	0–3	1–2	1–2	0–3
Washington	1–2	5–1	0–3	1–2	1–2	2–1	1–2	1–2	2–1	2–1	0–3	2–1	0–3	1–2	0–3

Updated with the results of all games through September 28, 2025.

== Game log ==
=== Regular season ===
Legend
Reds Win	Reds Loss	Game postponed	Clinched playoff spot

2025 Game Log: 83–79 (Home: 45–36; Away: 38–43)
March/April: 16–15 (Home: 7–8; Away: 9–7)

#	Date	Opponent	Score	Win	Loss	Save	Attendance	Record	Streak
1	March 27	Giants	4–6	Rogers (1–0)	Gibaut (0–1)	Walker (1)	43,876	0–1	L1
2	March 29	Giants	3–2	Lodolo (1–0)	Bivens (0–1)	Pagán (1)	40,200	1–1	W1
3	March 30	Giants	3–6	Ray (1–0)	Martinez (0–1)	Doval (1)	14,089	1–2	L1
4	March 31	Rangers	14–3	Singer (1–0)	Rocker (0–1)	—	10,533	2–2	W1
5	April 1	Rangers	0–1	Eovaldi (1–0)	Spiers (0–1)	—	14,852	2–3	L1
6	April 2	Rangers	0–1	Leiter (2–0)	Greene (0–1)	Jackson (3)	13,322	2–4	L2
7	April 3	@ Brewers	0–1	Cortés Jr. (1–1)	Lodolo (1–1)	Payamps (1)	20,113	2–5	L3
8	April 4	@ Brewers	2–3	Alexander (1–0)	Martinez (0–2)	Megill (1)	23,004	2–6	L4
9	April 5	@ Brewers	11–7	Singer (2–0)	Rodríguez (0–2)	—	32,772	3–6	W1
10	April 6	@ Brewers	2–8	Patrick (1–0)	Spiers (0–2)	—	25,778	3–7	L1
11	April 7	@ Giants	2–0	Greene (1–1)	Doval (1–1)	Santillan (1)	30,138	4–7	W1
12	April 8	@ Giants	1–0	Lodolo (2–1)	Roupp (0–1)	Pagán (2)	30,261	5–7	W2
13	April 9	@ Giants	6–8 (10)	Miller (1–0)	Pagán (0–1)	—	35,186	5–8	L1
14	April 11	Pirates	5–3	Singer (3–0)	Falter (0–2)	Pagán (3)	16,375	6–8	W1
15	April 12	Pirates	5–2	Abbott (1–0)	Heaney (0–1)	Pagán (4)	31,188	7–8	W2
16	April 13	Pirates	4–0	Greene (2–1)	Mlodzinski (1–2)	—	24,358	8–8	W3
17	April 15	Mariners	8–4	Barlow (1–0)	Castillo (1–2)	—	17,205	9–8	W4
18	April 16	Mariners	3–5	Miller (1–2)	Martinez (0–3)	Muñoz (7)	11,817	9–9	L1
19	April 17	Mariners	7–11 (10)	Legumina (1–0)	Ashcraft (0–1)	—	18,032	9–10	L2
20	April 18	@ Orioles	8–3	Abbott (2–0)	Povich (0–2)	—	42,587	10–10	W1
21	April 19	@ Orioles	5–9	Domínguez (2–0)	Greene (2–2)	Bautista (2)	28,534	10–11	L1
22	April 20	@ Orioles	24–2	Rogers (1–0)	Morton (0–5)	Wynne (1)	19,053	11–11	W1
23	April 21	@ Marlins	3–6	Meyer (2–2)	Lodolo (2–2)	Tinoco (2)	7,646	11–12	L1
24	April 22	@ Marlins	3–4	Bachar (1–0)	Ashcraft (0–2)	Faucher (2)	7,996	11–13	L2
25	April 23	@ Marlins	5–2	Singer (4–0)	Alcántara (2–2)	Pagán (5)	6,575	12–13	W1
26	April 25	@ Rockies	8–7	Ashcraft (1–2)	Chivilli (0–2)	Pagán (6)	21,743	13–13	W2
27	April 26	@ Rockies	6–4	Greene (3–2)	Senzatela (1–4)	Pagán (7)	34,040	14–13	W3
28	April 27	@ Rockies	8–1	Lodolo (3–2)	Blalock (0–1)	—	28,408	15–13	W4
29	April 28	Cardinals	3–1	Martinez (1–3)	Pallante (2–2)	Pagán (8)	15,147	16–13	W5
―	April 29	Cardinals	Postponed (rain); Makeup: April 30						
30	April 30	Cardinals	0–6	Mikolas (1–2)	Singer (4–1)	—	15,709	16–14	L1
31	April 30	Cardinals	1–9	Graceffo (1–0)	Petty (0–1)	—	13,550	16–15	L2

May: 13–15 (Home: 7–6; Road: 6–9)

#	Date	Opponent	Score	Win	Loss	Save	Attendance	Record	Streak/ box
32	May 1	Cardinals	9–1	Ashcraft (2–2)	Liberatore (2–3)	—	15,513	17–15	W1
33	May 2	Nationals	6–1	Greene (4–2)	Parker (3–2)	—	19,509	18–15	W2
34	May 3	Nationals	6–11	Williams (2–3)	Lodolo (3–3)	―	26,224	18–16	L1
35	May 4	Nationals	1–4	López (4–0)	Ashcraft (2–3)	Finnegan (11)	23,494	18–17	L2
36	May 5	@ Braves	0–4	Smith-Shawver (2–2)	Singer (4–2)	—	30,175	18–18	L3
37	May 6	@ Braves	1–2 (10)	Iglesias (2–2)	Richardson (0–1)	—	32,835	18–19	L4
38	May 7	@ Braves	4–3	Suter (1–0)	Holmes (2–3)	Pagán (9)	32,761	19–19	W1
39	May 8	@ Braves	4–5 (11)	Blewett (1–0)	Rogers (1–1)	—	33,794	19–20	L1
40	May 9	@ Astros	0–3	Brown (6–1)	Martinez (1–4)	Hader (9)	36,857	19–21	L2
41	May 10	@ Astros	13–9	Ashcraft (3–3)	McCullers Jr. (0–1)	—	32,335	20–21	W1
42	May 11	@ Astros	0–6	Blanco (3–3)	Petty (0–2)	—	37,794	20–22	L1
43	May 13	White Sox	1–5 (10)	Wilson (1–0)	Pagán (0–2)	—	18,997	20–23	L2
44	May 14	White Sox	2–4	Martin (2–4)	Lodolo (3–4)	Vasil (1)	43,585	20–24	L3
45	May 15	White Sox	7–1	Martinez (2–4)	Wilson (0–2)	—	19,513	21–24	W1
46	May 16	Guardians	5–4	Singer (5–2)	Bibee (4–5)	Pagán (10)	26,131	22–24	W2
47	May 17	Guardians	4–1	Mey (1–0)	Cecconi (0–1)	Pagán (11)	28,586	23–24	W3
48	May 18	Guardians	3–1	Abbott (3–0)	Ortiz (2–5)	Pagán (12)	27,628	24–24	W4
49	May 19	@ Pirates	7–1	Lodolo (4–4)	Keller (1–6)	—	10,842	25–24	W5
50	May 20	@ Pirates	0–1	Falter (3–3)	Martinez (2–5)	Bednar (4)	10,071	25–25	L1
51	May 21	@ Pirates	1–3	Heaney (3–3)	Singer (5–3)	Santana (5)	17,308	25–26	L2
52	May 23	Cubs	6–13	Flexen (2–0)	Santillan (0–1)	—	30,120	25–27	L3
53	May 24	Cubs	6–4	Abbott (4–0)	Rea (3–1)	Pagán (13)	40,409	26–27	W1
54	May 25	Cubs	8–11	Pomeranz (2–0)	Rogers (2–1)	Palencia (2)	32,823	26–28	L1
55	May 26	@ Royals	7–4	Martinez (3–5)	Lorenzen (3–6)	—	18,002	27–28	W1
56	May 27	@ Royals	7–2	Singer (6–3)	Clarke (1–1)	—	17,383	28–28	W2
57	May 28	@ Royals	2–3	Cameron (2–1)	Greene (4–3)	Estévez (15)	15,430	28–29	L1
58	May 30	@ Cubs	6–2	Abbott (5–0)	Rea (3–2)	Pagán (14)	36,019	29–29	W1
59	May 31	@ Cubs	0–2	Keller (2–0)	Ashcraft (3–4)	Palencia (5)	39,144	29–30	L1

June: 15–11 (Home: 10–5; Road: 5–6)

#	Date	Opponent	Score	Win	Loss	Save	Attendance	Record	Streak/ box
60	June 1	@ Cubs	3–7	Taillon (5–3)	Martinez (3–6)	—	40,179	29–31	L2
61	June 2	Brewers	2–3	Civale (1–1)	Singer (6–4)	Megill (12)	18,711	29–32	L3
62	June 3	Brewers	4–2	Ashcraft (4–4)	Peralta (5–4)	Pagán (15)	25,749	30–32	W1
63	June 4	Brewers	1–9	Priester (3–2)	Abbott (5–1)	—	21,775	30–33	L1
64	June 6	Diamondbacks	4–3 (10)	Santillan (1–1)	Thompson (1–2)	—	24,697	31–33	W1
65	June 7	Diamondbacks	13–1	Martinez (4–6)	R. Nelson (2–2)	—	27,951	32–33	W2
66	June 8	Diamondbacks	4–2	Rogers (2–2)	Gallen (4–8)	Santillan (2)	21,083	33–33	W3
67	June 9	@ Guardians	7–4	Miley (1–0)	Ortiz (3–7)	Pagán (16)	23,436	34–33	W4
68	June 10	@ Guardians	1–0	Abbott (6–1)	Cecconi (1–3)	—	26,753	35–33	W5
69	June 11	@ Guardians	2–11	Allen (4–4)	Lodolo (4–5)	—	28,564	35–34	L1
70	June 13	@ Tigers	5–11	Montero (3–1)	Martinez (4–7)	—	40,413	35–35	L2
71	June 14	@ Tigers	11–1	Singer (7–4)	Flaherty (5–7)	—	30,199	36–35	W1
72	June 15	@ Tigers	8–4	Ashcraft (5–4)	Vest (5–1)	—	40,418	37–35	W2
73	June 17	Twins	6–5	Barlow (2–0)	Stewart (1–1)	Pagán (17)	26,153	38–35	W3
74	June 18	Twins	4–2 (6)	Lodolo (5–5)	Ober (4–4)	—	25,911	39–35	W4
75	June 19	Twins	5–12	Paddack (3–6)	Martinez (4–8)	—	27,306	39–36	L1
76	June 20	@ Cardinals	1–6	Pallante (5–3)	Singer (7–5)	—	35,334	39–37	L2
77	June 21	@ Cardinals	5–6 (11)	Maton (1–2)	Petty (0–3)	—	27,283	39–38	L3
78	June 22	@ Cardinals	4–1	Abbott (7–1)	Mikolas (4–5)	Pagán (18)	27,477	40–38	W1
79	June 23	Yankees	6–1	Barlow (3–0)	Winans (0–1)	—	31,418	41–38	W2
80	June 24	Yankees	5–4 (11)	Phillips (1–0)	Leiter Jr. (4–4)	—	39,257	42–38	W3
81	June 25	Yankees	1–7	Fried (10–2)	Singer (7–6)	—	27,620	42–39	L1
82	June 27	Padres	8–1	Martinez (5–8)	Cease (3–7)	—	26,746	43–39	W1
83	June 28	Padres	4–6	Hoeing (1–0)	Richardson (0–2)	Suárez (23)	31,380	43–40	L1
84	June 29	Padres	3–2	Pagán (1–2)	Suárez (2–4)	—	23,510	44–40	W1
85	June 30	@ Red Sox	6–13	Crochet (8–4)	Burns (0–1)	—	35,691	44–41	L1

July: 13–12 (Home: 8–6; Road: 5–6)

#	Date	Opponent	Score	Win	Loss	Save	Attendance	Record	Streak/ box
86	July 1 (Note: The July 1 game was suspended due to rain in the top of the fourth inning with the Red Sox leading 2–1; it was completed before the regularly scheduled game on July 2.)	@ Red Sox	3–5	Bello (4–3)	Richardson (0–3)	Chapman (15)	32,355	44–42	L2
87	July 2	@ Red Sox	8–4	Martinez (6–8)	Weissert (2–3)	—	35,845	45–42	W1
88	July 4	@ Phillies	9–6	Moll (1–0)	Luzardo (7–5)	Pagán (19)	42,166	46–42	W2
89	July 5	@ Phillies	1–5	Romano (1–3)	Lodolo (5–6)	—	42,045	46–43	L1
90	July 6	@ Phillies	1–3	Wheeler (9–3)	Santillan (1–2)	—	42,055	46–44	L2
91	July 7	Marlins	1–5	Junk (3–1)	Singer (7–7)	Bender (2)	17,167	46–45	L3
92	July 8	Marlins	2–12	Pérez (2–2)	Martinez (6–9)	—	22,399	46–46	L4
93	July 9	Marlins	7–2	Abbott (8–1)	Alcántara (4–9)	—	15,867	47–46	W1
94	July 10	Marlins	6–0	Lodolo (6–6)	Quantrill (3–8)	—	28,950	48–46	W2
95	July 11	Rockies	2–3	Bird (3–1)	Santillan (1–3)	Vodnik (3)	31,092	48–47	L1
96	July 12	Rockies	4–3	Pagán (2–2)	Vodnik (3–3)	—	33,663	49–47	W1
97	July 13	Rockies	4–2	Martinez (7–9)	Gomber (0–3)	Pagán (20)	24,541	50–47	W2
ASG	July 15	AL @ NL	–					—	—
98	July 18	@ Mets	8–4	Lodolo (7–6)	Carrillo (0–1)	—	42,390	51–47	W3
99	July 19	@ Mets	5–2	Martinez (8–9)	Holmes (8–5)	Pagán (21)	42,605	52–47	W4
100	July 20	@ Mets	2–3	Díaz (5–0)	Suter (1–1)	Stanek (2)	42,981	52–48	L1
101	July 21	@ Nationals	8–10	Chafin (1–0)	Singer (7–8)	—	15,558	52–49	L2
102	July 22	@ Nationals	1–6	Pilkington (1–0)	Burns (0–2)	—	29,071	52–50	L3
103	July 23	@ Nationals	5–0	Lodolo (8–6)	Soroka (3–8)	—	21,567	53–50	W1
104	July 25	Rays	7–2	Martinez (9–9)	Littell (8–8)	—	30,110	54–50	W2
105	July 26	Rays	6–2	Ashcraft (6–4)	Baker (3–4)	—	39,848	55–50	W3
106	July 27	Rays	2–1	Singer (8–8)	Baz (8–7)	Pagán (22)	20,258	56–50	W4
107	July 28	Dodgers	2–5	Yamamoto (9–7)	Burns (0–3)	Dreyer (1)	33,589	56–51	L1
108	July 29	Dodgers	4–5	Díaz (1–0)	Pagán (2–3)	Vesia (4)	36,135	56–52	L2
109	July 30	Dodgers	5–2	Barlow (4–0)	Sheehan (2–2)	Santillan (3)	32,976	57–52	W1
110	July 31	Braves	11–12 (10)	Johnson (2–3)	Pagán (2–4)	Iglesias (13)	27,169	57–53	L1

August: 12–15 (Home: 5–6; Road: 7–9)

#	Date	Opponent	Score	Win	Loss	Save	Attendance	Record	Streak/ box
111	August 1	Braves	3–2	Singer (9–8)	Elder (4–8)	Pagán (23)	29,269	58–53	W1
112	August 2* (Note: The August 2 game was suspended due to rain in the bottom of the first inning with the Reds leading 1–0; it was completed on August 3, which was originally a scheduled off-day for both the Braves and Reds.)	Braves	2–4	Waldrep (1–0)	Suter (1–2)	Iglesias (14)	91,032	58–54	L1
113	August 4	@ Cubs	3–2	Barlow (5–0)	Brasier (0–1)	Pagán (24)	37,937	59–54	W1
114	August 5	@ Cubs	5–1	Littell (9–8)	Kittredge (2–3)	—	39,797	60–54	W2
115	August 6	@ Cubs	1–6	Horton (6–3)	Abbott (8–2)	—	37,648	60–55	L1
116	August 7	@ Pirates	0–7	Skenes (7–8)	Singer (9–9)	—	20,339	60–56	L2
117	August 8	@ Pirates	2–3	Nicolas (1–0)	Santillan (1–4)	Santana (7)	22,092	60–57	L3
118	August 9	@ Pirates	2–1	Martinez (10–9)	Mlodzinski (2–7)	Pagán (25)	30,274	61–57	W1
119	August 10	@ Pirates	14–8	Barlow (6–0)	Ramírez (1–1)	—	21,239	62–57	W2
120	August 11	Phillies	1–4	Romano (2–4)	Abbott (8–3)	Kerkering (3)	43,800	62–58	L1
121	August 12	Phillies	6–1	Singer (10–9)	Suárez (8–6)	—	29,654	63–58	W1
122	August 13	Phillies	8–0	Greene (5–3)	Sánchez (11–4)	—	25,869	64–58	W2
123	August 15	Brewers	8–10	Mears (4–3)	Barlow (6–1)	Megill (29)	25,470	64–59	L1
124	August 16	Brewers	5–6 (11)	Megill (4–2)	La Sorsa (0–1)	Mears (1)	39,022	64–60	L2
125	August 17	Brewers	3–2 (10)	Ashcraft (7–4)	Anderson (2–4)	—	26,426	65–60	W1
126	August 18	@ Angels	4–1	Singer (11–9)	Mederos (0–1)	Barlow (1)	25,421	66–60	W2
127	August 19	@ Angels	6–4	Mey (2–0)	Jansen (5–3)	Santillan (4)	22,276	67–60	W3
128	August 20	@ Angels	1–2	Detmers (4–3)	Ashcraft (7–5)	García (1)	27,083	67–61	L1
129	August 22	@ Diamondbacks	5–6 (11)	Beeks (4–1)	Barlow (6–2)	—	29,252	67–62	L2
130	August 23	@ Diamondbacks	1–10	Crismatt (1–0)	Abbott (8–4)	Woodford (1)	36,567	67–63	L3
131	August 24	@ Diamondbacks	6–1	Ashcraft (8–5)	Backhus (0–3)	—	25,496	68–63	W1
132	August 25	@ Dodgers	0–7	Sheehan (5–2)	Greene (5–4)	—	49,702	68–64	L1
133	August 26	@ Dodgers	3–6	Kershaw (9–2)	Martinez (10–10)	Scott (20)	44,943	68–65	L2
134	August 27	@ Dodgers	1–5	Ohtani (1–1)	Lodolo (8–7)	—	49,199	68–66	L3
135	August 29	Cardinals	5–7 (10)	Svanson (3–0)	Santillan (1–5)	Fernandez (1)	21,587	68–67	L4
136	August 30	Cardinals	2–4	McGreevy (6–2)	Abbott (8–5)	Leahy (1)	32,076	68–68	L5
137	August 31	Cardinals	7–4	Singer (12–9)	Pallante (6–13)	Pagán (26)	27,238	69–68	W1
*August 2 game played at Bristol Motor Speedway in Bristol, Tennessee

September: 14–11 (Home: 8–5; Road: 6–6)

#	Date	Opponent	Score	Win	Loss	Save	Attendance	Record	Streak/ box
138	September 1	Blue Jays	5–4	Zulueta (1–0)	Little (4–2)	—	21,773	70–68	W2
139	September 2	Blue Jays	9–12	Varland (4–3)	Barlow (6–3)	Hoffman (30)	20,769	70–69	L1
140	September 3	Blue Jays	9–13	Bieber (2–1)	Martinez (10–11)	—	17,134	70–70	L2
141	September 5	Mets	4–5	Peterson (9–5)	Abbott (8–6)	Díaz (26)	21,231	70–71	L3
142	September 6	Mets	6–3	Singer (13–9)	Tong (1–1)	—	26,782	71–71	W1
143	September 7	Mets	3–2	Greene (6–4)	Sproat (0–1)	Santillan (5)	25,662	72–71	W2
144	September 8	@ Padres	3–4 (10)	Peralta (6–1)	Martinez (10–12)	—	40,248	72–72	L1
145	September 9	@ Padres	4–2	Phillips (2–0)	Suárez (4–6)	Pagán (27)	41,364	73–72	W1
146	September 10	@ Padres	2–1	Abbott (9–6)	Morejón (11–5)	Santillan (6)	40,045	74–72	W2
147	September 12	@ Athletics	0–3	Ferguson (4–2)	Singer (13–10)	Newcomb (2)	8,333	74–73	L1
148	September 13	@ Athletics	5–11	Basso (1–0)	Martinez (10–13)	—	8,758	74–74	L2
149	September 14	@ Athletics	4–7	Morales (4–1)	Lodolo (8–8)	Kelly (1)	8,778	74–75	L3
150	September 15	@ Cardinals	11–6	Phillips (3–0)	Fernandez (0–4)	—	18,095	75–75	W1
151	September 16	@ Cardinals	0–3	McGreevy (7–3)	Abbott (9–7)	O'Brien (5)	21,848	75–76	L1
152	September 17	@ Cardinals	6–2	Singer (14–10)	Pallante (6–15)	—	23,462	76–76	W1
153	September 18	Cubs	1–0	Greene (7–4)	Rea (10–7)	—	18,532	77–76	W2
154	September 19	Cubs	7–4	Phillips (4–0)	Hodge (2–2)	Pagán (28)	25,584	78–76	W3
155	September 20	Cubs	6–3	Littell (10–8)	Pomeranz (2–2)	Pagán (29)	31,756	79–76	W4
156	September 21	Cubs	1–0	Martinez (11–13)	Taillon (10–7)	Santillan (7)	29,661	80–76	W5
157	September 23	Pirates	2–4	Barco (1–0)	Singer (14–11)	Santana (15)	29,847	80–77	L1
158	September 24	Pirates	3–4 (11)	Ramírez (2–3)	Martinez (11–14)	―	30,725	80–78	L2
159	September 25	Pirates	2–1	Lodolo (9–8)	Ashcraft (4–4)	Pagán (30)	24,249	81–78	W1
160	September 26	@ Brewers	3–1	Phillips (5–0)	Priester (13–3)	Pagán (31)	40,316	82–78	W2
161	September 27	@ Brewers	7–4	Abbott (10–7)	Gasser (0–2)	Pagán (32)	40,801	83–78	W3
162	September 28	@ Brewers	2–4	Megill (6–3)	Singer (14–12)	Uribe (7)	41,055	83–79	L1

== Postseason ==
=== Game log ===
2025 Postseason Game Log: 0–2 (Home: 0–0; Away: 0–2)
NL Wild Card Series: 0–2 (Home: 0–0; Away: 0–2)

#	Date	Opponent	Score	Win	Loss	Save	Attendance	Record
1	September 30	@ Dodgers	5–10	Snell (1–0)	Greene (0–1)	—	50,555	0–1
2	October 1	@ Dodgers	4–8	Yamamoto (1–0)	Littell (0–1)	—	50,465	0–2

=== Postseason rosters ===
Playoff rosters
National League Wild Card Series

- Pitchers: 15 Emilio Pagán 21 Hunter Greene 23 Graham Ashcraft 26 Chase Burns 28 Nick Martinez 31 Brent Suter 34 Connor Phillips 40 Nick Lodolo 41 Andrew Abbott 52 Zack Littell 58 Scott Barlow 64 Tony Santillan
- Catchers: 35 Jose Trevino 37 Tyler Stephenson
- Infielders: 3 Ke'Bryan Hayes 4 Santiago Espinal 7 Spencer Steer 9 Matt McLain 38 Miguel Andújar 43 Sal Stewart 44 Elly De La Cruz
- Outfielders: 2 Gavin Lux 12 Austin Hays 16 Noelvi Marte 29 TJ Friedl 30 Will Benson
- Designated hitters:

=== Transactions ===
==== March 2025 ====
March 27	Designated CF Stuart Fairchild for assignment.
March 30	Traded CF Stuart Fairchild to the Atlanta Braves for cash.

==== April 2025 ====
April 1	Sent LHP Andrew Abbott on a rehab assignment to the Louisville Bats.
April 4	Sent RHP Alexis Díaz on a rehab assignment to the Louisville Bats.
April 8	Placed SS Matt McLain (slight left hamstring strain) on the 10-day injured list retroactive to April 5. Optioned RHP Carson Spiers to the Louisville Bats. Recalled 3B Noelvi Marte from the Louisville Bats. Recalled LF Will Benson from the Louisville Bats. Re-signed free agent RHP Jake Gilbert to a minor league contract.
April 9	Signed free agent RHP Adam Plutko from the Minnesota Twins to a minor league contract.
April 10	Sent LF Austin Hays on a rehab assignment to the Louisville Bats. Signed free agent SS Bryson Brigman from the Arizona Diamondbacks to a minor league contract.
April 12	Activated LHP Andrew Abbott from the 15-day injured list. Optioned LF Will Benson to the Louisville Bats.
April 14	Placed LHP Sam Moll (left shoulder impingement) on the 15-day injured list retroactive to April 11.
April 15	Activated LF Austin Hays from the 10-day injured list. Activated SS Matt McLain from the 10-day injured list. Activated RHP Alexis Díaz from the 15-day injured list. Optioned LF Jacob Hurtubise to the Louisville Bats. Optioned 3B Noelvi Marte to the Louisville Bats.
April 17	Placed 1B Christian Encarnacion-Strand (low back inflammation) on the 10-day injured list. Recalled 3B Noelvi Marte from the Louisville Bats.
April 18	Placed LHP Nick Lodolo on the paternity list. Recalled RHP Carson Spiers from the Louisville Bats.
April 20	Placed RHP Carson Spiers (right shoulder impingement) on the 15-day injured list. Selected the contract of RHP Randy Wynne from the Louisville Bats.
April 21	Activated LHP Nick Lodolo from the paternity list. Optioned RHP Randy Wynne to the Louisville Bats.
April 22	Sent C Tyler Stephenson on a rehab assignment to the Louisville Bats. Sent LHP Sam Moll on a rehab assignment to the Louisville Bats.
April 24	Sent RHP Randy Wynne outright to the Louisville Bats.
April 25	Signed international free agent Luisangel Chirino to a minor league contract. Signed international free agent Ysaias Escalona to a minor league contract.
April 26	Placed RHP Ian Gibaut (right shoulder impingement) on the 15-day injured list. Recalled RHP Lyon Richardson from the Louisville Bats.
April 30	Placed 3B Jeimer Candelario (lumber spine strain) on the 10-day injured list retroactive to April 28. Recalled 2B Tyler Callihan from the Louisville Bats. Selected the contract of RHP Chase Petty from the Louisville Bats.

==== May 2025 ====
May 1	Recalled RHP Luis Mey from the Louisville Bats. Recalled RHP Yosver Zulueta from the Louisville Bats. Optioned RHP Lyon Richardson to the Louisville Bats. Optioned RHP Chase Petty to the Louisville Bats. Optioned RHP Alexis Díaz to the Louisville Bats. Signed international free agent LHP Iker Redona to a minor league contract. Signed international free agent RHP Jefersson Marte to a minor league contract.
May 2	Activated C Tyler Stephenson from the 10-day injured list. Placed LF Austin Hays (left hamstring strain) on the 10-day injured list retroactive to April 29.
May 6	Placed 2B Tyler Callihan (left forearm fracture) on the 10-day injured list. Optioned RHP Yosver Zulueta to the Louisville Bats. Recalled RHP Lyon Richardson from the Louisville Bats. Recalled LF Jacob Hurtubise from the Louisville Bats. Sent RHP Rhett Lowder on a rehab assignment to the ACL Reds.
May 7	Placed 3B Noelvi Marte (left oblique strain) on the 10-day injured list. Recalled RF Rece Hinds from the Louisville Bats.
May 9	Traded RHP Andrew Moore and cash to the San Diego Padres for 1B Connor Joe. Activated LF Austin Hays from the 10-day injured list. Transferred 2B Tyler Callihan (left forearm fracture) from the 10-day injured list to the 60-day injured list. Placed RHP Hunter Greene (right groin strain) on the 15-day injured list retroactive to May 8. Optioned LF Blake Dunn to the Louisville Bats. Optioned LF Jacob Hurtubise to the Louisville Bats. Recalled LF Will Benson from the Louisville Bats. Recalled RHP Chase Petty from Louisville Bats. Signed free agent RHP Beau Blanchard from the Baltimore Orioles to a minor league contract.
May 10	Placed RF Jake Fraley (left calf tenderness) on the 10-day injured list retroactive to May 7. Activated 1B Connor Joe.
May 11	Sent RHP Ian Gibaut on a rehab assignment to the Louisville Bats. Sent RHP Rhett Lowder on a rehab assignment to the Dayton Dragons.
May 12	Signed international free agent RHP Edgar Lugo to a minor league contract.
May 16	Sent RHP Rhett Lowder on a rehab assignment to the Louisville Bats.
May 20	Signed free agent LHP Jacob Edwards from the High Point Rockers of the ALPB to a minor league contract. Signed free agent RHP Zachary Murray of the Williamsport Crosscutters of the MLBD to a minor league contract.
May 21	Activated RHP Ian Gibaut from the 15-day injured list. Activated LHP Sam Moll from the 15-day injured list. Optioned LHP Sam Moll to the Louisville Bats. Optioned RHP Chase Petty to the Louisville Bats.
May 22	Sent 1B Christian Encarnacion-Strand on a rehab assignment to the ACL Reds. Optioned RHP Lyon Richardson to the Louisville Bats.
May 23	Activated RHP Hunter Greene from the 15-day injured list. Transferred RHP Carson Spiers (right shoulder impingement) from the 15-day injured list to the 60-day injured list. Signed free agent 2B Garrett Hampson from the Arizona Diamondbacks to a one-year, $760,000 contract. Optioned RF Rece Hinds to the Louisville Bats. Signed international free agent LHP Malvin Garcia to a minor league contract.
May 24	Sent RF Jake Fraley on a rehab assignment to the Louisville Bats.
May 25	Sent 1B Christian Encarnacion-Strand on a rehab assignment to the Louisville Bats.
May 28	Signed free agent 2B Peyton Holt from the Frederick Keys of the MLBD to a minor league contract.
May 29	Traded RHP Alexis Díaz to the Los Angeles Dodgers for RHP Mike Villani. Optioned RHP Luis Mey to the Louisville Bats.
May 30	Activated RF Jake Fraley from the 10-day injured list. Recalled RHP Lyon Richardson from the Louisville Bats. Placed LF Austin Hays (left foot contusion) on the 10-day injured list.
May 31	Signed international free agent C Angel Barboza to a minor league contract.

==== June 2025 ====
June 2	Sent 3B Jeimer Candelario on a rehab assignment to the ACL Reds.
June 3	Selected the contract of LHP Joe La Sorsa from the Louisville Bats. Reassigned LHP Joe La Sorsas to the minor leagues.
June 4	Signed free agent LHP Wade Miley from the Louisville Bats of the IL to a one-year, $2.5 million contract. Placed RHP Hunter Greene (right groin strain) on the 15-day injured list. Placed RHP Rhett Lowder on the 60-day injured list. Signed international free agent RHP Luis Avila to a minor league contract. Signed international free agent RHP Julio Pinales to a minor league contract.
June 5	Sent 3B Jeimer Candelario on a rehab assignment to the Louisville Bats.
June 6	Activated 1B Christian Encarnacion-Strand from the 10-day injured list. Designated C Austin Wynns for assignment.
June 7	Recalled LHP Joe La Sorsa from the Louisville Bats.
June 8	Traded C Austin Wynns to the Athletics for cash. Optioned LHP Joe La Sorsa to the Louisville Bats.
June 10	Placed LHP Brent Suter on the bereavement list. Recalled LHP Joe La Sorsa from the Louisville Bats. Signed free agent C Dayne Leonard of the Great Falls Voyagers of the PL to a minor league contract.
June 12	Optioned LHP Joe La Sorsa to the Louisville Bats. Signed international free agent RHP Deivi Garcia to a minor league contract.
June 13	Activated LHP Brent Suter from the bereavement list.
June 14	Traded cash to the Boston Red Sox for RHP Brian Van Belle. Claimed RF Ryan Vilade off waivers from the St. Louis Cardinals. Optioned RHP Brian Van Belle to the Louisville Bats. Optioned RF Ryan Vilade to the Louisville Bats. Designated LF Jacob Hurtubise for assignment.
June 17	LF Jacob Hurtubise claimed off waivers by the Seattle Mariners. Placed RHP Graham Ashcraft (right groin strain) on the 15-day injured list retroactive to June 16. Recalled RHP Luis Mey from the Louisville Bats.
June 20	Placed LHP Wade Miley (left flexor strain) on the 15-day injured list retroactive to June 17. Recalled RHP Connor Phillips from the Louisville Bats. Sent 3B Noelvi Marte on a rehab assignment to the ACL Reds.
June 21	Recalled RHP Chase Petty from the Louisville Bats. Optioned RHP Luis Mey to the Louisville Bats.
June 22	Designated 2B Garrett Hampson for assignment. Recalled RF Rece Hinds from the Louisville Bats. Recalled RHP Yosver Zulueta from the Louisville Bats. Optioned RHP Chase Petty to the Louisville Bats.
June 23	Activated 3B Jeimer Candelario from the 10-day injured list. Designated 3B Jeimer Candelario for assignment.
June 24	2B Garrett Hampson claimed off waivers by the St. Louis Cardinals. Selected the contract of RHP Chase Burns from the Louisville Bats. Optioned RHP Yosver Zulueta to the Louisville Bats. Sent LF Austin Hays on a rehab assignment to the Chattanooga Lookouts. Activated RHP Chase Burns.
June 25	Recalled RF Ryan Vilade from the Louisville Bats. Sent 3B Noelvi Marte on a rehab assignment to the Chattanooga Lookouts.
June 27	Placed RF Jake Fraley (right shoulder sprain) on the 10-day injured list retroactive to June 24. Activated LF Austin Hays from the 10-day injured list. Signed international free agent RHP Anderson Perez to a minor league contract.
June 28	Signed free agent RHP Zach Willeman from the Sioux City Explorers of the AAPB to a minor league contract.
June 29	Released 3B Jeimer Candelario.
June 30	Placed RHP Ian Gibaut (right shoulder impingement) on the 15-day injured list retroactive to June 29. Recalled LHP Joe La Sorsa from the Louisville Bats.

==== July 2025 ====
July 1	Selected the contract of RHP Sam Benschoter from the Louisville Bats. Recalled LHP Sam Moll from the Louisville Bats. Optioned LHP Joe La Sorsa to the Louisville Bats. Optioned RHP Connor Phillips to the Louisville Bats. Signed free agnet RHP Buck Farmer from the Los Angeles Angels to a minor league contract. Sent 3B Noelvi Marte on a rehab assignment to the Louisville Bats.
July 2	Recalled RHP Yosver Zulueta from the Louisville Bats. Signed international free agent 1B Jordan Ouanyou to a minor league contract.
July 3	Optioned RHP Yosver Zulueta to the Louisville Bats. Sent RHP Carson Spiers on a rehab assignment to the ACL Reds.
July 4	Activated RHP Graham Ashcraft from the 15-day injured list. Activated 3B Noelvi Marte from the 10-day injured list. Optioned RHP Sam Benschoter to the Louisville Bats. Optioned RF Ryan Vilade to the Louisville Bats. Sent RF Connor Joe on a rehab assignment to the Louisville Bats.
July 7	Activated RF Connor Joe from the 10-day injured list. Optioned RF Rece Hinds to the Louisville Bats.
July 8	Sent RHP Carson Spiers on a rehab assignment to the Louisville Bats. Sent RF Jake Fraley on a rehab assignment to the Louiville Bats.
July 12	Activated RF Jake Fraley from the 10-day injured list. Optioned 1B Christian Encarnacion-Strand to the Louisville Bats.
July 22	Signed free agent LHP Reid Clague to a minor league contract.
July 23	Sent RHP Hunter Greene on a rehab assignment to the ACL Reds.
July 25	Placed RHP Scott Barlow on the paternity list. Recalled RHP Luis Mey from the Louisville Bats.
July 26	Activated RHP Scott Barlow from the paternity list. Optioned RHP Luis Mey from the Louisville Bats.
July 29	Placed CF TJ Friedl on the paternity list. Recalled RHP Rece Hinds from the Louisville Bats. Sent RHP Hunter Greene on a rehab assignment to the Louisville Bats.
July 30	Traded RHP Brian Van Belle and LHP Adam Serwinowski to the Tampa Bay Rays for RHP Zack Littell. Traded LHP Taylor Rogers, SS Sammy Stafura and cash to the Pittsburgh Pirates for 3B Ke'Bryan Hayes. Recalled RHP Luis Mey from the Louisville Bats.
July 31	Traded RHP Kenya Huggins to the Athletics for LF Miguel Andujar. Activated 3B Ke'Bryan Hayes. Optioned RF Rece Hinds to the Louisville Bats. Transferred LHP Wade Miley (left flexor strain) from the 15-day injured list to the 60-day injured list.

==== August 2025 ====
August 1	Placed CF TJ Friedl on the restricted list.
August 2	Activated LF Miguel Andujar. Activated RHP Zack Littell. Activated CF TJ Friedl from the restricted list. Optioned RF Connor Joe to the Louisville Bats. Optioned RHP Lyon Richardson to the Louisville Bats.
August 3	Recalled RHP Lyon Richardson from the Louisville Bats. Optioned LF Will Benson to the Louisville Bats. Sent RHP Ian Gibaut on a rehab assignment to the Louisville Bats.
August 4	Optioned RHP Lyon Richardson to the Louisville Bats.
August 5	Placed LHP Nick Lodolo (left finger blister) on the 15-day injured list. Recalled RHP Yosver Zulueta from the Louisville Bats. Signed free agent LHP Charlie Barnes from the Lotte Giants of the KBO League to a minor league contract.
August 8	Recalled RHP Sam Benschoter from the Louisville Bats. Optioned RHP Yosver Zulueta to the Louisville Bats.
August 12	Signed free agent RHP Griffin Green from the Frederick Keys of the MLBD to a minor league contract. Signed free agent RHP Connor O'Hara of the Staten Island FerryHawks of the ALPB to a minor league contract.
August 13	Activated RHP Hunter Greene from the 15-day injured list. Optioned RHP Sam Benschoter to Louisville Bats.
August 15	Placed RHP Chase Burns (grade 1 right flexor strain) on the 15-day injured list. Recalled LHP Joe La Sorsa from the Louisville Bats. Sent LHP Wade Miley on a rehab assignment to the Chattanooga Lookouts.
August 17	Designated RF Jake Fraley for assignment. Optioned LHP Joe La Sorsa to the Louisville Bats. Recalled LF Will Benson from the Louisville Bats. Recalled RHP Connor Phillips from the Louisville Bats.
August 19	RF Jake Fraley claimed off of waivers by the Atlanta Braves. Signed free agent SS Alexander Vargas from the New York Yankees to a minor league contract.
August 20	Placed C Tyler Stephenson (left thumb fracture) on the 10-day injured list. Selected the contract of C Will Banfield from the Louisville Bats.
August 21	Optioned RHP Luis Mey to the Louisville Bats.
August 22	Selected the contract of Zach Maxwell from the Louisville Bats.
August 26	Signed free agent RHP Julian Garcia of the Kansas City Monarchs of the AAPB to a minor league contract.
August 27	Placed RHP Graham Ashcraft (right forearm strain) on the 15-day injured list retroactive to August 25. Activated LHP Nick Lodolo from the 15-day injured list.
August 31	Sent RF Connor Joe outright to Louisville Bats.

==== September 2025 ====
September 1	Recalled RHP Yosver Zulueta from the Louisville Bats. Selected the contract of 3B Sal Stewart from the Louisville Bats.
September 2	Selected the contract of LHP Reiver Sanmartin from the Louisville Bats. Optioned LHP Sam Moll to the Louisville Bats. Designated LHP Joe La Sorsa for assignment.
September 3	Recalled RHP Lyon Richardson from the Louisville Bats. Optioned LHP Reiver Sanmartin to the Louisville Bats. Sent C Tyler Stephenson on a rehab assignment to the Louisville Bats.
September 5	Activated C Tyler Stephenson from the 10-day injured list. Optioned C Will Banfield to the Louisville Bats. Sent LHP Joe La Sorsa to the Louisville Bats.
September 11	Activated RHP Chase Burns from the 15-day injured list. Activated RHP Graham Ashcraft from the 15-day injured list. Optioned RHP Lyon Richardson to the Louisville Bats. Optioned RHP Yosver Zulueta to the Louisville Bats.
September 13	Sent RHP Rhett Lowder on a rehab assignment to the Louisville Bats.
September 29	Recalled RF Ryan Vilade from the Louisville Bats. Recalled C Will Banfield from the Louisville Bats. Recalled LHP Sam Moll from the Louisville Bats. Recalled LHP Reiver Sanmartin from the Louisville Bats. Recalled RF Rece Hinds from the Louisville Bats. Recalled RHP Yosver Zulueta from the Louisville Bats. Recalled RHP Chase Petty from the Louisville Bats. Recalled RHP Lyon Richardson from the Louisville Bats. Recalled 1B Christian Encarnacion-Strand from the Louisville Bats. Recalled LF Blake Dunn from the Louisville Bats. Recalled RHP Sam Benschoter from the Louisville Bats. Recalled RHP Luis Mey from the Louisville Bats.

== Roster ==
2025 Cincinnati Reds
Roster
Pitchers: 41 Andrew Abbott; 23 Graham Ashcraft; 58 Scott Barlow; 26 Chase Burns; 43 Alexis Díaz; 79 Ian Gibaut; 21 Hunter Greene; 66 Joe La Sorsa; 52 Zack Littell; 40 Nick Lodolo; 28 Nick Martinez; 78 Zach Maxwell; 62 Luis Mey; 22 Wade Miley; 50 Sam Moll; 15 Emilio Pagán; 61 Chase Petty; 34 Connor Phillips; 72 Lyon Richardson; 55 Taylor Rogers; 48 Reiver Sanmartín; 64 Tony Santillan; 51 Brady Singer; 68 Carson Spiers; 31 Brent Suter; 53 Randy Wynne; 67 Yosver Zulueta	Catchers: 49 Will Banfield; 37 Tyler Stephenson; 35 Jose Trevino; 38 Austin Wynns; Infielders: 3 Jeimer Candelario; 44 Elly De La Cruz; 33 Christian Encarnacion-Strand; 4 Santiago Espinal; 3 Ke'Bryan Hayes; 9 Matt McLain; 7 Spencer Steer; 43 Sal Stewart	Outfielders: 38 Miguel Andújar; 30 Will Benson; 32 Tyler Callihan; 59 Blake Dunn; 27 Jake Fraley; 29 TJ Friedl; 6 Garrett Hampson; 12 Austin Hays; 57 Rece Hinds; 26 Jacob Hurtubise; 17 Connor Joe; 2 Gavin Lux; 16 Noelvi Marte; 46 Ryan Vilade	Manager: 77 Terry Francona; Coaches: 92 Kyle Arnsberg (assistant coach); 45 Freddie Benavides (bench coach/field coordinator); 54 Collin Cowgill (first base); 91 Jose Duarte (bullpen catcher); 56 J. R. House (third base/catching); 36 Derek Johnson (director of pitching); 95 James Keller (bullpen catcher); 96 Simon Mathews (assistant pitching); 73 Brad Mills (bench coach); 75 Mike Napoli (staff assistant); 93 Alex Pelaez (assistant hitting); 94 Will Remillard (assistant hitting); 90 Matt Tracy (bullpen); 76 Chris Valaika (hitting)

== Player stats ==
= Indicates team leader

= Indicates league leader

=== Batting ===
Note: G = Games played; AB = At bats; R = Runs scored; H = Hits; 2B = Doubles; 3B = Triples; HR = Home runs; RBI = Runs batted in; SB = Stolen bases; BB = Walks; AVG = Batting average; SLG = Slugging average

Player	G	AB	R	H	2B	3B	HR	RBI	SB	BB	AVG	SLG
Elly De La Cruz	162	629	102	166	31	7	22	86	37	67	.264	.440
TJ Friedl	152	579	82	151	22	2	14	53	12	81	.261	.378
Matt McLain	147	510	73	112	18	0	15	50	18	55	.220	.343
Spencer Steer	146	509	66	121	21	2	21	75	7	51	.238	.411
Gavin Lux	140	446	49	120	28	2	5	53	1	56	.269	.374
Austin Hays	103	380	60	101	16	5	15	64	7	29	.266	.453
Noelvi Marte	90	339	45	89	17	2	14	51	10	16	.263	.448
Santiago Espinal	114	301	25	73	12	0	0	16	2	21	.243	.282
Tyler Stephenson	88	299	40	69	18	0	13	50	0	37	.231	.421
Jose Trevino	93	282	30	67	20	0	4	22	0	15	.238	.351
Will Benson	90	230	31	52	8	2	12	41	2	16	.226	.435
Jake Fraley	67	168	29	39	8	0	6	23	4	24	.232	.387
Ke'Bryan Hayes	52	158	16	37	6	1	3	13	2	18	.234	.342
Christian Encarnacion-Strand	36	130	13	27	4	0	6	19	0	3	.208	.377
Miguel Andújar	34	103	14	37	7	0	4	17	0	6	.359	.544
Jeimer Candelario	22	80	3	9	2	0	2	10	0	9	.113	.213
Connor Joe	35	61	2	13	4	0	0	4	2	6	.213	.279
Blake Dunn	30	60	10	9	2	0	1	7	1	8	.150	.233
Sal Stewart	18	55	11	14	1	0	5	8	0	3	.255	.545
Rece Hinds	15	43	6	5	1	0	2	3	0	1	.255	.545
Austin Wynns	18	40	6	16	3	0	3	11	0	3	.400	.700
Garrett Hampson	9	18	0	3	1	0	0	0	0	1	.167	.222
Jacob Hurtubise	12	12	3	1	0	0	0	0	0	1	.083	.083
Will Banfield	7	10	0	1	0	0	0	0	0	0	.100	.100
Tyler Callihan	4	6	0	1	0	0	0	1	0	0	.167	.167
Ryan Vilade	1	0	0	0	0	0	0	0	0	0	.---	.---
Totals	162	5448	716	1333	250	23	167	677	105	527	.245	.391

Source:Baseball Reference

=== Pitching ===
Note: W = Wins; L = Losses; ERA = Earned run average; G = Games pitched; GS = Games started; SV = Saves; IP = Innings pitched; H = Hits allowed; R = Runs allowed; ER = Earned runs allowed; BB = Walks allowed; SO = Strikeouts

Player	W	L	ERA	G	GS	SV	IP	H	R	ER	BB	SO
Brady Singer	14	12	4.03	32	32	0	169.2	150	80	76	60	163
Andrew Abbott	10	7	2.87	29	29	0	166.1	148	60	53	43	149
Nick Martinez	11	14	4.45	40	26	0	165.2	158	86	82	42	116
Nick Lodolo	9	8	3.33	29	28	0	156.2	138	60	58	31	156
Hunter Greene	7	4	2.76	19	19	0	107.2	75	35	33	26	132
Tony Santillan	1	5	2.44	80	0	7	73.2	53	23	20	29	75
Emilio Pagán	2	4	2.88	70	0	32	68.2	41	26	22	22	81
Scott Barlow	6	3	4.21	75	1	1	68.1	50	35	32	45	75
Brent Suter	1	2	4.52	48	3	0	67.2	69	38	34	18	53
Graham Ashcraft	8	5	3.99	62	0	0	65.1	68	37	29	25	64
Zack Littell	2	0	4.39	10	10	0	53.1	46	28	26	11	41
Chase Burns	0	3	4.57	13	8	0	43.1	41	25	22	16	67
Lyon Richardson	0	3	4.54	34	0	0	37.2	37	25	19	21	30
Taylor Rogers	2	2	2.45	40	0	0	33.0	29	15	9	19	34
Ian Gibaut	0	1	4.62	25	0	0	25.1	26	13	13	8	15
Connor Phillips	5	0	2.88	21	0	0	25.0	11	9	8	12	32
Luis Mey	2	0	3.43	23	0	0	21.0	17	8	8	17	21
Sam Moll	1	0	6.38	23	0	0	18.1	16	16	13	10	22
Carson Spiers	0	2	6.08	3	2	0	13.1	13	9	9	7	11
Wade Miley	1	0	6.75	3	2	0	12.0	15	9	9	6	7
Zach Maxwell	0	0	4.50	8	0	0	10.0	10	5	5	4	13
Yosver Zulueta	1	0	6.14	7	0	0	7.1	5	5	5	4	5
Joe La Sorsa	0	1	10.80	5	0	0	6.2	13	9	8	2	2
Alexis Díaz	0	0	12.00	6	0	0	6.0	8	8	8	5	3
Chase Petty	0	3	19.50	3	2	0	6.0	14	14	13	8	7
Randy Wynne	0	0	3.00	1	0	1	3.0	3	1	1	1	3
Jose Trevino	0	0	3.86	2	0	0	2.1	4	1	1	1	1
Reiver Sanmartin	0	0	0.00	1	0	0	1.2	2	1	0	1	2
Totals	83	79	3.86	162	162	41	1435.0	1260	681	616	494	1380

Source:Baseball Reference

== Farm system ==
Level	Team	League	Manager
AAA	Louisville Bats	International League	
AA	Chattanooga Lookouts	Southern League	
High-A	Dayton Dragons	Midwest League	
Low-A	Daytona Tortugas	Florida State League	
Rookie	ACL Reds	Arizona Complex League	
Foreign Rookie	DSL Reds	Dominican Summer League	
