= Sam Benschoter =

American baseball player (born 1998)

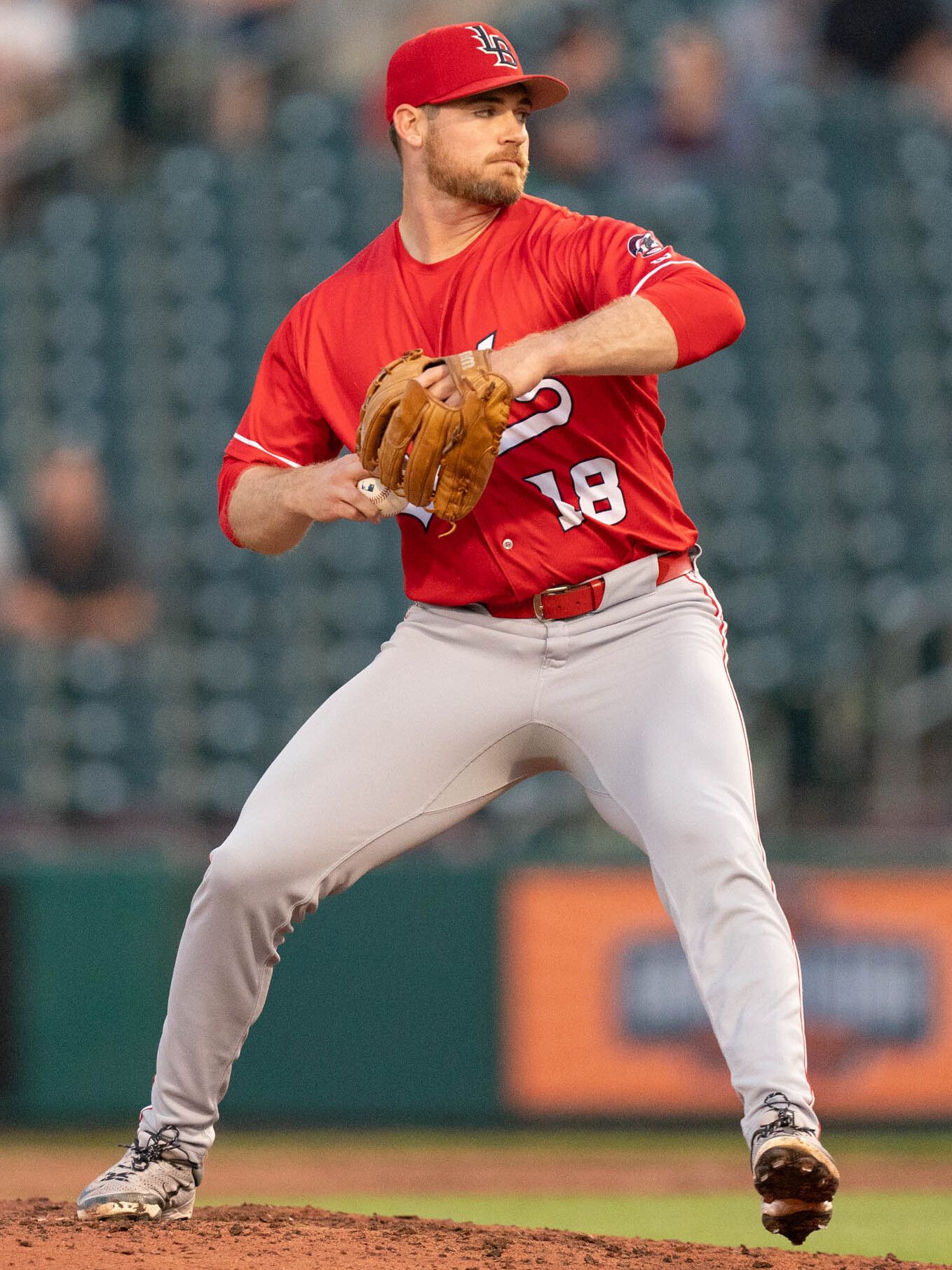
- Benschoter with the Louisville Bats in 2025

Cincinnati Reds
- Pitcher
- Born: March 17, 1998 (age 28); Ann Arbor, Michigan, U.S.
- Bats: Left Throws: Right

Samuel Adam Benschoter (born March 17, 1998) is an American professional baseball pitcher in the Cincinnati Reds organization. He is currently a phantom ballplayer, having spent a total of eight days on the Reds' active roster without appearing in a game.

== Career ==
Benschoter attended Tecumseh High School in Tecumseh, Michigan, and Michigan State University, where he played college baseball for the Michigan State Spartans.

Benschoter signed with the Cincinnati Reds as an undrafted free agent on August 1, 2021, and split his first professional season between the rookie-level Arizona Complex League Reds and Single-A Daytona Tortugas. He split the 2022 season between the ACL Reds, Daytona, the High-A Dayton Dragons, and Double-A Chattanooga Lookouts. In 22 appearances (17 starts) for the four affiliates, Benschoter compiled a 4–6 record and 4.73 ERA with 118 strikeouts over 78 innings of work.

Benschoter made 27 starts for Double-A Chattanooga in 2023, struggling to a 7–12 record and 7.28 ERA with 140 strikeouts across 123 2/3 innings pitched. He split the 2024 season between Chattanooga and the Triple-A Louisville Bats, registering a combined 4–5 record and 4.33 ERA with 101 strikeouts in 104 innings of work across 33 games (11 starts). Benschoter played for the United States national baseball team in the 2024 WBSC Premier12.

On July 1, 2025, Benschoter was selected to the 40-man roster and promoted to the major leagues for the first time. He was optioned to the Triple-A Louisville Bats on July 4, without making an appearance for the Reds. On August 8, Benschoter was promoted for a second time. However, he again failed to appear for Cincinnati and was optioned to Louisville on August 13. On November 6, Benschoter was removed from the 40-man roster and sent outright to Triple-A Louisville.

In 2026, he returned to Triple-A Louisville Bats he appeared in 31 games (9 starts) throwing 66.2 innings going 5-5 with a 4.86 ERA with 56 strikeouts and one save.

== Personal life ==
Benschoter's father, Adam, also played professional baseball.
