= Tyler Callihan =

American baseball player (born 2000)

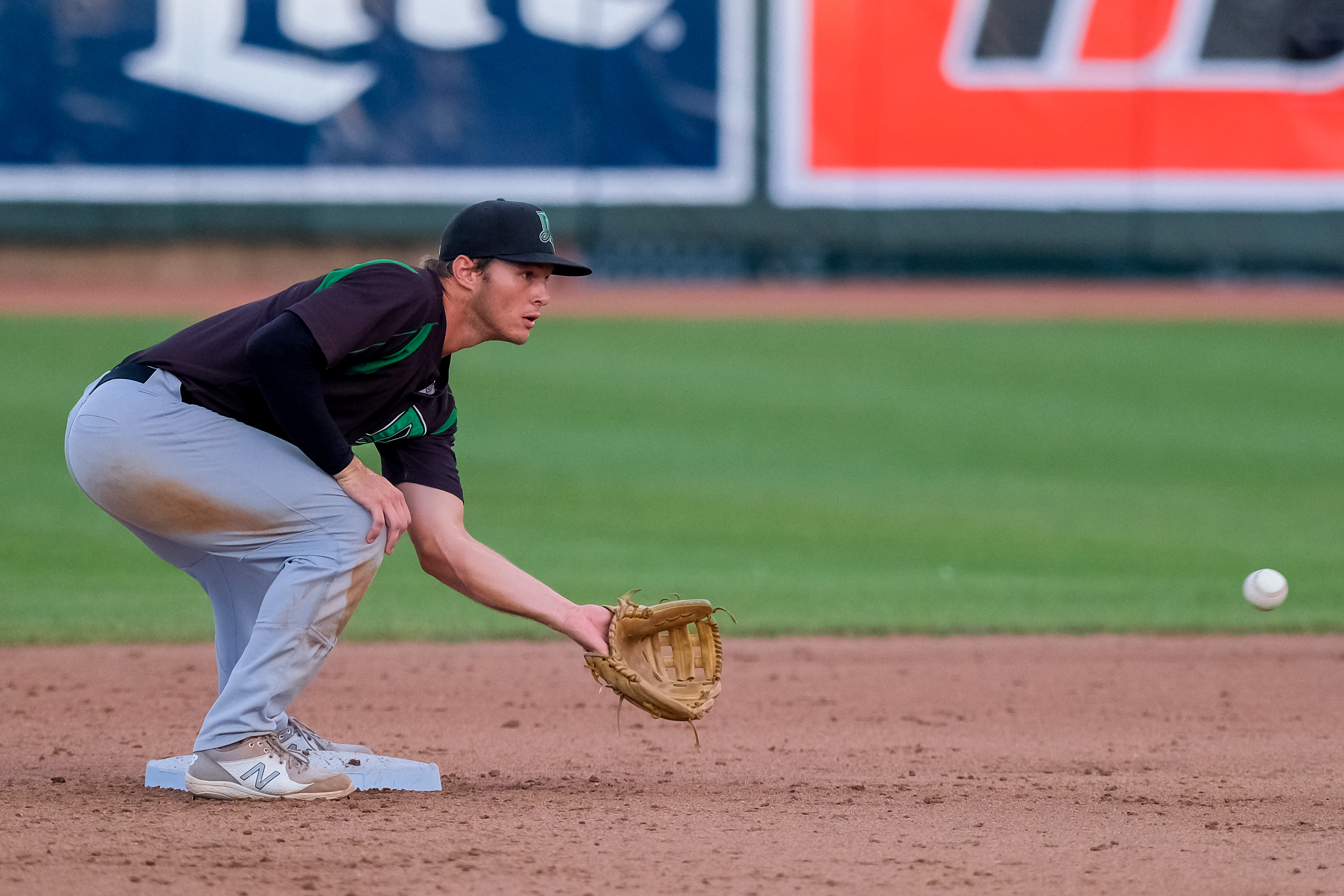
- Callihan with the Dayton Dragons in 2022

Pittsburgh Pirates – No. 37
- Third baseman / Outfielder
- Born: June 22, 2000 (age 26); Jacksonville, Florida, U.S.
- Bats: Left Throws: Right

MLB debut
- April 30, 2025, for the Cincinnati Reds

MLB statistics (through 2026 season)
- Batting average: .208
- Home runs: 3
- Runs batted in: 16
- Stats at Baseball Reference

Teams
- Cincinnati Reds (2025); Pittsburgh Pirates (2026–present)
Medals
Men's baseball
Representing United States
COPABE U-18 Pan-American Championship
Gold medal – first place	2018 Panama	Team

Tyler Callihan (born June 22, 2000) is an American professional baseball third baseman and outfielder for the Pittsburgh Pirates of Major League Baseball (MLB). He has previously played in MLB for the Cincinnati Reds. He made his MLB debut in 2025.

== Amateur career ==
Callihan attended Providence School in Jacksonville, Florida, where he began starting on their varsity baseball team as an eighth grader. In 2018, as a junior, he hit .440 with 11 home runs. As a senior in 2019, he batted .456 with 12 home runs and also pitched to a 1.08 ERA over 26 innings.

Callihan also played for the U.S. national under-18 team at the 2018 Under-18 Pan-American Championship. He was named to the All-Tournament team as a first baseman after batting .529 with five doubles in nine games. He also pitched, striking out five batters in three innings.

== Professional career ==
=== Cincinnati Reds ===
The Cincinnati Reds selected Callihan in the third round with the 85th overall selection of the 2019 Major League Baseball draft. He signed for $1.5 million, forgoing his commitment to play college baseball for South Carolina. Callihan made his professional debut with the Greeneville Reds and was promoted to the Billings Mustangs at the end of August. Over 57 games between the two teams, he batted .263 with six home runs, 33 RBI, and 11 stolen bases. Callihan did not play in a game in 2020 due to the cancellation of the minor league season because of the COVID-19 pandemic.

Callihan opened the 2021 season with the Daytona Tortugas. After 23 games in which he hit .299 with two home runs, he suffered a right elbow injury and missed the remainder of the season. After missing the beginning of the 2022 season while recovering from injury, he returned in mid-May with the Tortugas and hit a home run in his first at-bat. In late June, he was promoted to the Dayton Dragons. Over 88 games between the two teams, Callihan batted .250 with seven home runs, 33 RBI, 19 doubles, and 15 stolen bases. Callihan played the 2023 season with both Dayton and the Double-A Chattanooga Lookouts, hitting .249 with nine home runs, 58 RBI, and 29 stolen bases over 131 games.

Callihan spent the 2024 campaign back with Chattanooga and also had a four-game stint with the Triple-A Louisville Bats. In 69 games for Chattanooga, he slashed .271/.345/.413 with eight home runs, 25 RBI, and 21 stolen bases. Following the season, the Reds added Callihan to their 40-man roster to protect him from the Rule 5 draft.

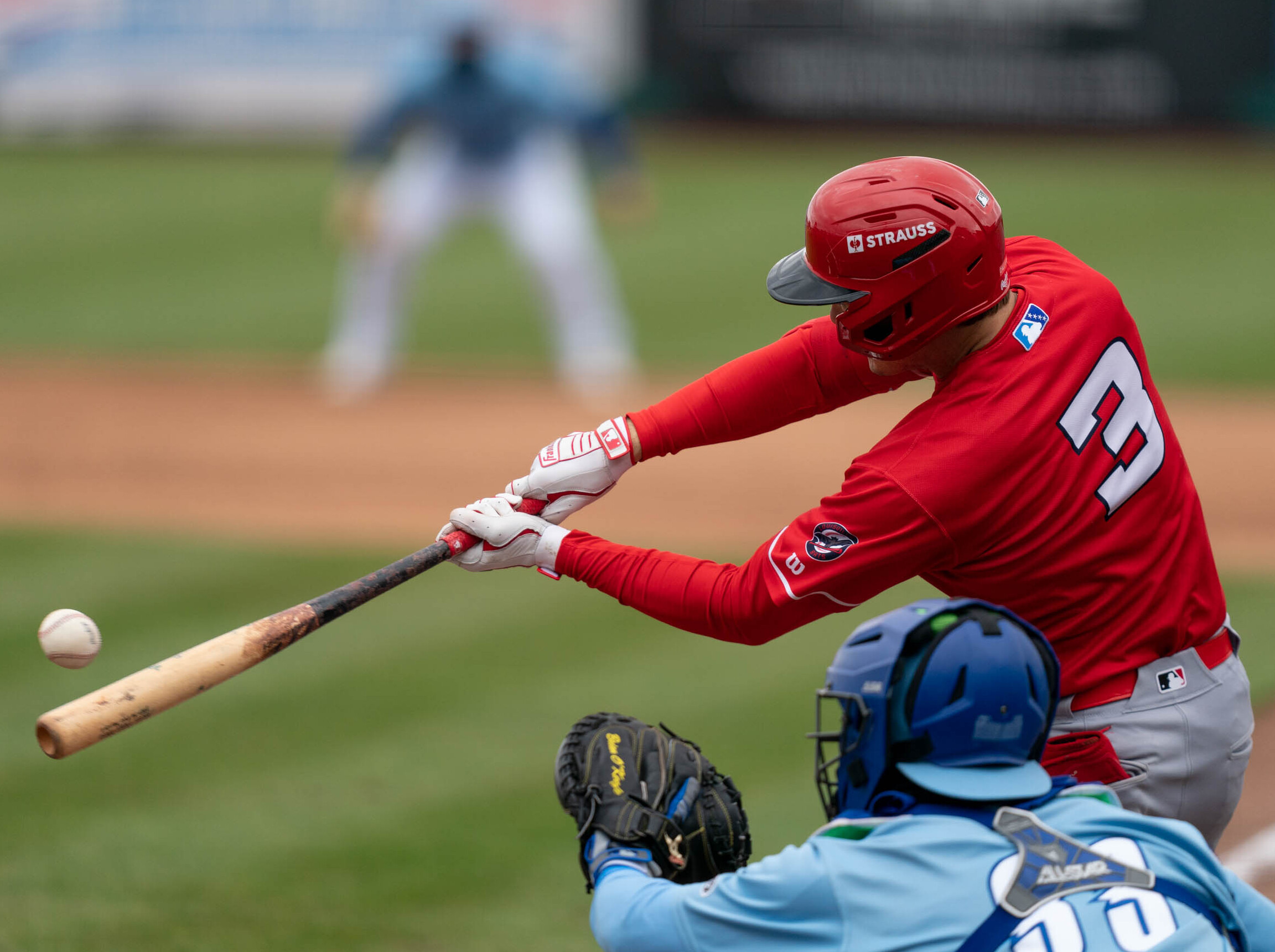
Callihan batting for Louisville in 2025

The Reds optioned Callihan to Triple-A Louisville to begin the 2025 season. On April 30, 2025, Callihan was promoted to the major leagues for the first time. Callihan recorded his first hit and run batted in on May 3, in a game against the Washington Nationals. While facing the Atlanta Braves on May 5, Callihan fractured his left forearm colliding into an outfield wall. He was initially placed on the 10-day injured list, but transferred to the 60-day after the brunt of his injury was shown. At first, Callihan was expected to miss two months of the regular season recovering from the injury. However, on July 11, Callihan underwent a follow-up surgery, and it was announced that he would likely miss the remainder of the season.

=== Pittsburgh Pirates ===
On March 4, 2026, Callihan was traded to the Pittsburgh Pirates in exchange for pitcher Kyle Nicolas. He was optioned to the Triple-A Indianapolis Indians to begin the regular season. He was recalled by the Pirates for the first time on May 28. On June 10, Callihan hit his first career home run off of Shohei Ohtani of the Los Angeles Dodgers; later in the same game, he recorded his second home run against Kyle Hurt. He was optioned back to the Indians on July 29 with whom he played the remainder of the season, batting .226 with 10 home runs and 36 RBI across 90 games. Callihan played in 40 games with the Pirates and hit .211 with three home runs and 15 RBI.
