= TJ Friedl =

American baseball player (born 1995)

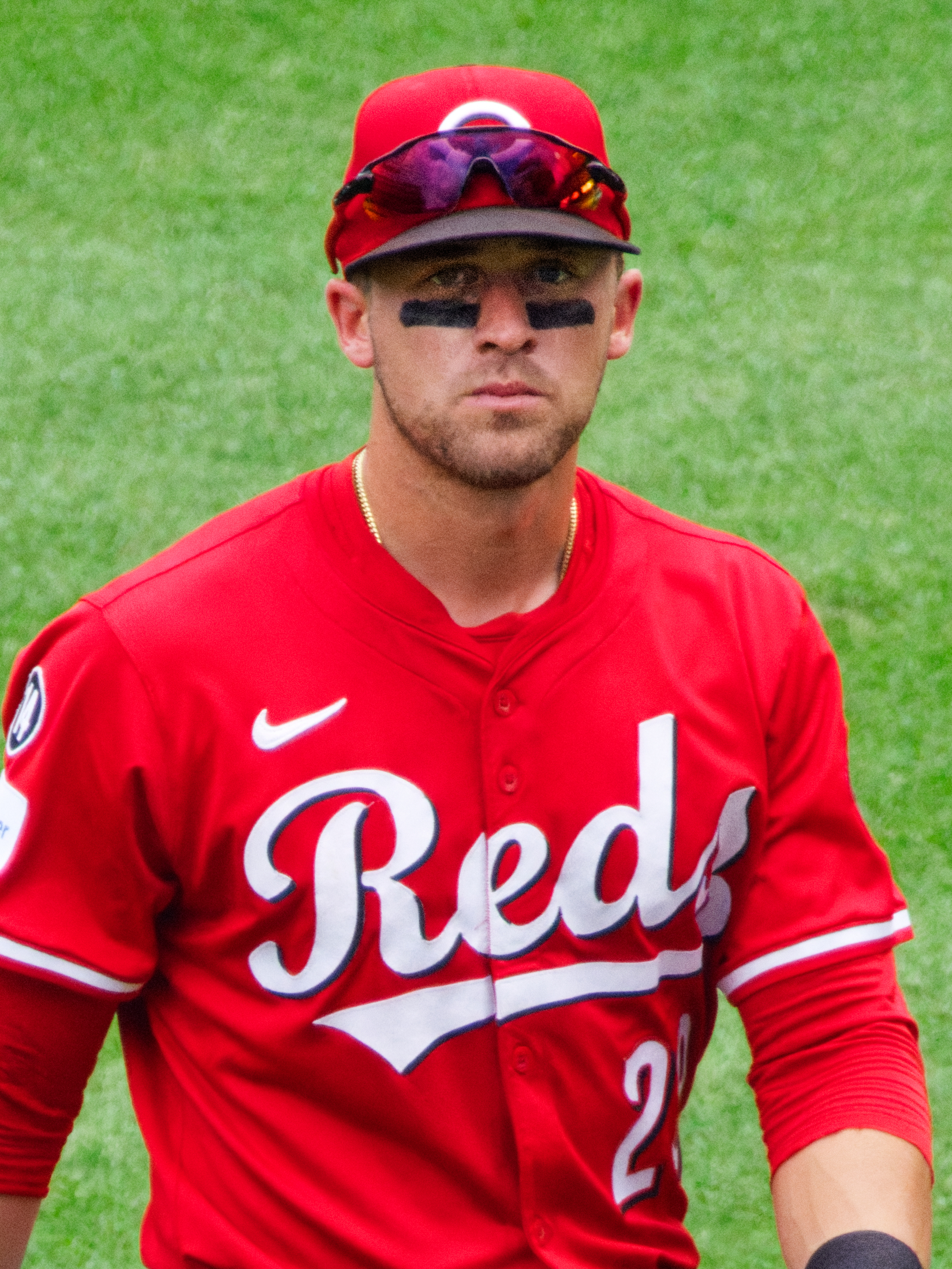
- Friedl with the Reds in 2025

Free agent
- Outfielder
- Born: August 14, 1995 (age 31); Sewickley, Pennsylvania, U.S.
- Bats: Left Throws: Left

MLB debut
- September 18, 2021, for the Cincinnati Reds

MLB statistics (through 2026 season)
- Batting average: .246
- Home runs: 58
- Runs batted in: 214
- Stats at Baseball Reference

Teams
- Cincinnati Reds (2021–2026)

Terry Lee "TJ" Friedl (born August 14, 1995) is an American professional baseball outfielder who is a free agent. He has previously played in Major League Baseball (MLB) for the Cincinnati Reds. After playing college baseball for the Nevada Wolf Pack, he signed with the Reds, receiving the largest bonus ever given to an undrafted free agent, in 2016. Friedl made his MLB debut in 2021.

== Amateur career ==
Friedl attended Foothill High School in Pleasanton, California, where he played for the school's basketball and baseball teams. He was a letterman in three seasons for the baseball team, and had a .308 batting average. He enrolled at the University of Nevada, Reno, where he walked on to the Nevada Wolf Pack baseball team. He batted .216 in 37 at bats as a freshman. When told he would play sparingly again as a sophomore, Friedl agreed to take a redshirt year to preserve a season of eligibility. In his junior year, Friedl received more playing time. He batted .401, the 11th-best batting average in college baseball, and finished with the second-most triples, 17th-best on-base percentage (.494), and 24th-most hits (89). Friedl was named to the Mountain West Conference's first team. He was set to become the Wolf Pack's captain in his next season.

Mistakenly believing that he needed to play college baseball for three years, rather than attend college for three years, to be eligible for the Major League Baseball (MLB) draft, Friedl did not consider it an option. That summer he played for the St. Cloud Rox of the Northwoods League where he hit .373 in 16 games with 12 stolen bases and was selected to play in the all-star game but prior to the NWL all-star game he signed with the United States national collegiate baseball team, and compiled a .290 batting average and a .536 slugging percentage. Scouts for MLB teams began to contact Friedl about signing.

== Professional career ==
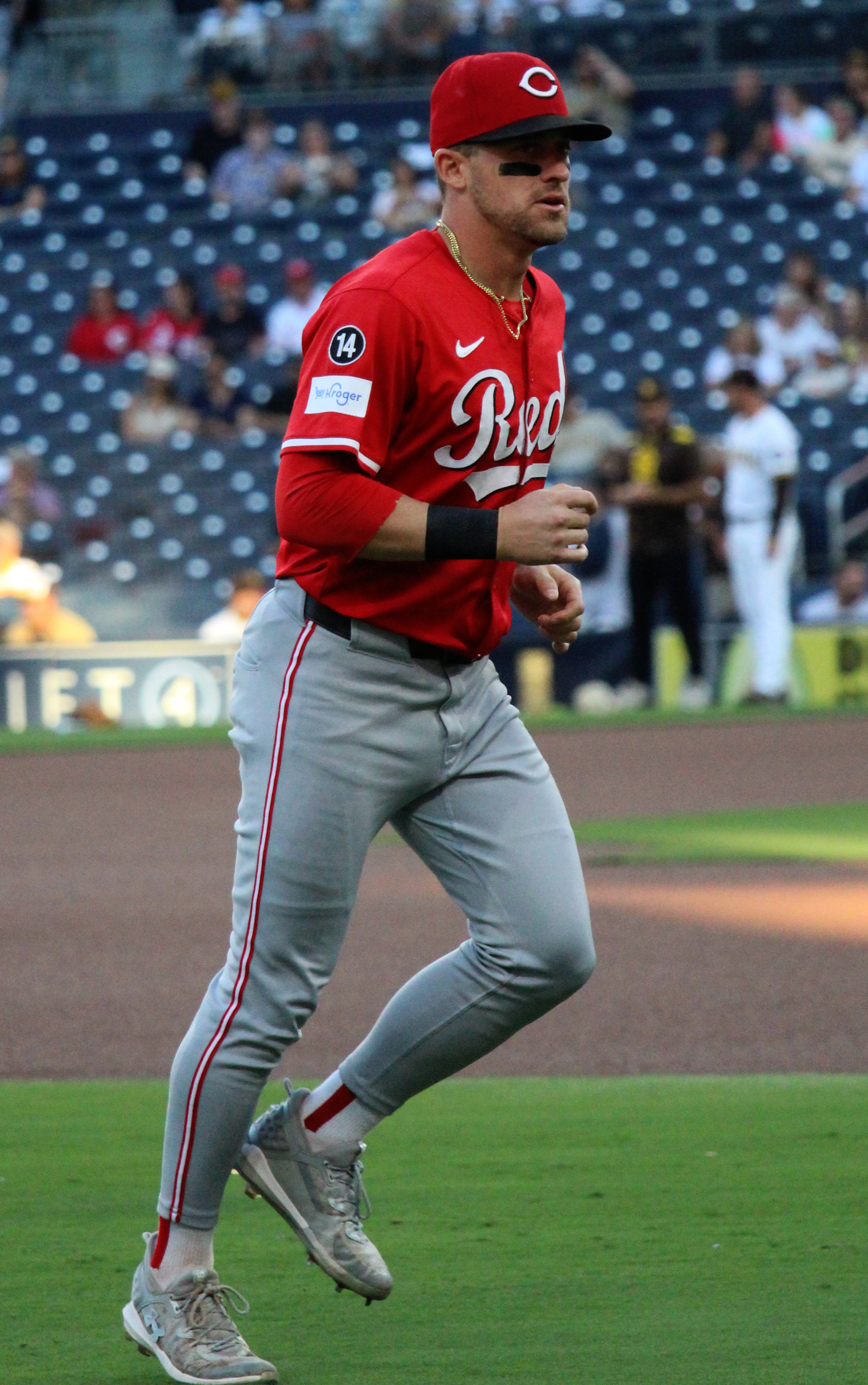
Friedl in 2025

Friedl signed with the Cincinnati Reds in July 2016. He received a $732,500 signing bonus, the biggest bonus given to an undrafted free agent. He made his professional debut with the Billings Mustangs of the Rookie-level Pioneer League, and hit two home runs in his first game. In total, he finished 2016 with a .347 batting average, three home runs, and 17 runs batted in (RBI) in 29 games. In 2017, Friedl played for both the Dayton Dragons and the Daytona Tortugas, posting a combined .273 batting average with seven home runs, 38 RBI, and 16 stolen bases in 114 games between both teams. Friedl spent 2018 with both Daytona and the Pensacola Blue Wahoos, batting .284/.381/.384 with five home runs, 51 RBI, and thirty stolen bases in 131 games between the two clubs.

Friedl spent the 2019 season with the Chattanooga Lookouts, hitting .235/.347/.385 with five home runs and 28 RBI. He did not play in 2020 due to the cancellation of the Minor League Baseball season because of the COVID-19 pandemic. In 2021, Friedl played for the Triple–A Louisville Bats, hitting .264/.357/.422 with 12 home runs and 36 RBI.

On September 18, 2021, the Reds selected Friedl's contract to the active roster. He made his major league debut that day as a pinch hitter. Friedl recorded his first major league hit, a home run, on September 19.

During spring training in 2024, Friedl broke his wrist.

On August 26, 2026, Friedl was placed on waivers by the Reds. He was not claimed by another team and remained with the Reds. Friedl made 91 appearances for Cincinnati during the regular season, batting .172/.255/.255 with four home runs, 13 RBI, and five stolen bases. On September 20, Friedl was designated for assignment by the Reds. He cleared waivers and was sent outright to Triple–A Louisville on September 22. He elected free agency on September 29.

== Personal life ==
Friedl has three older sisters. His second cousin is Arkansas Razorbacks men's basketball coach John Calipari.
