= Rece Hinds =

American baseball player (born 2000)

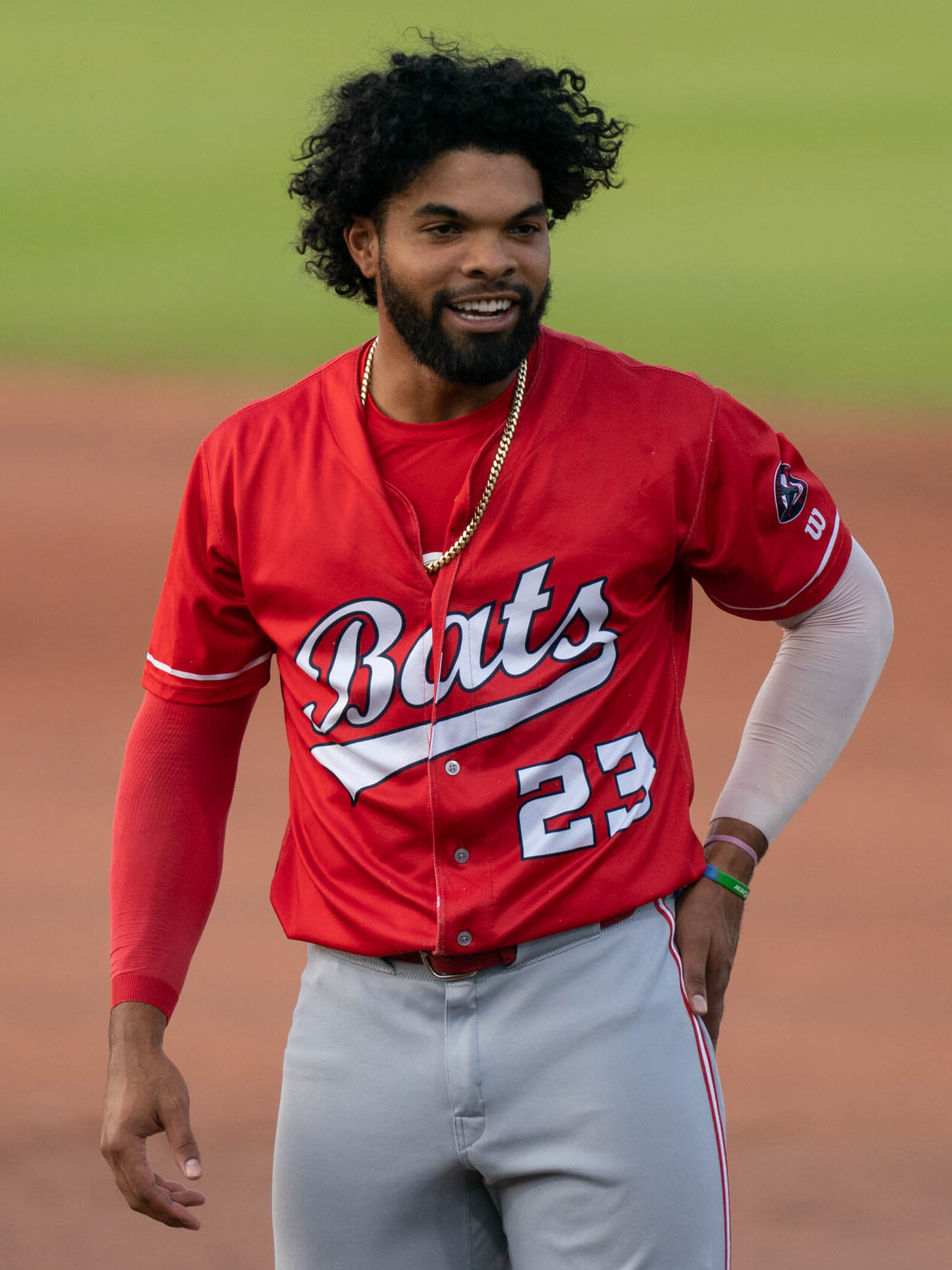
- Hinds with the Louisville Bats in 2025

Free agent
- Outfielder
- Born: September 5, 2000 (age 26); Niceville, Florida, U.S.
- Bats: Right Throws: Right

MLB debut
- July 8, 2024, for the Cincinnati Reds

MLB statistics (through 2026 season)
- Batting average: .171
- Home runs: 7
- Runs batted in: 20
- Stats at Baseball Reference

Teams
- Cincinnati Reds (2024–2026); Miami Marlins (2026); Baltimore Orioles (2026)

Rece Xola Hinds (born September 5, 2000) is an American professional baseball outfielder who is a free agent. He has previously played in Major League Baseball (MLB) for the Cincinnati Reds, Miami Marlins, and Baltimore Orioles. He made his MLB debut in 2024.

== Early life and career ==
Hinds was born and grew up in Niceville, Florida, and initially attended Niceville High School. He was invited to play in the Under Armour All-America Game after both his sophomore and junior seasons. As a junior, Hinds hit .494 with 12 home runs and was also invited to the Perfect Game All-American Classic. Following his junior season, he transferred to IMG Academy in Bradenton, Florida. Hinds batted .361 with 33 runs, 17 RBI, 14 stolen bases in his only season at IMG.

== Professional career ==
=== Cincinnati Reds ===
The Cincinnati Reds selected Hinds in the second round, with the 49th overall selection, of the 2019 Major League Baseball draft. After signing with the team he was assigned to the Greeneville Reds of the Low–A Appalachian League, where went 0–for-8 with two walks in 10 plate appearances. Hinds did not play in a game in 2020 due to the cancellation of the minor league season because of the COVID-19 pandemic, but was added to the Reds' alternate training site roster shortly after the beginning of the 2020 Major League Baseball season. Hinds was named the best overall athlete in the Reds' minor league system going into the 2021 season. Hinds spent the 2021 season with the Daytona Tortugas of the Low-A Southeast, slashing .251/.319/.515 with ten home runs, 27 RBI, and six stolen bases over 43 games. He missed time during the season due to a torn meniscus.

On March 5, 2022, the Reds announced that Hinds would be switching his position from third base to the outfield. Reds farm director Shawn Pender added "We made a decision to get him (Hinds) on the field healthier." In 79 games split between three minor league affiliates, Hinds hit .233/.304/.428 with 12 home runs, 30 RBI, and 15 stolen bases. He played in the 2022 Arizona Fall League, where he batted .234/.280/.403, and led the league in strikeouts (33; in 77 at bats).

Hinds spent the entirety of the 2023 campaign with the Double–A Chattanooga Lookouts. In 109 games with the club, he slashed .269/.330/.536 with 20 home runs, 98 RBI, and 20 stolen bases. On November 14, 2023, the Reds added Hinds to their 40-man roster to protect him from the Rule 5 draft.

Hinds was optioned to the Triple–A Louisville Bats to begin the 2024 season. In 77 games for Louisville, he hit .216/.290/.409 with 13 home runs, 41 RBI, and 12 stolen bases. On July 8, 2024, Hinds was promoted to the major leagues for the first time. Hinds began his Major League career with 5 home runs in his first 6 games. On July 25, he was optioned back to the Louisville Bats. In 24 total games during his rookie campaign, Hinds batted .261/.333/.717 with five home runs, 11 RBI, and two stolen bases.

Hinds was optioned to Triple-A Louisville to begin the 2025 season. Hinds played in 15 contests for Cincinnati during the year, going 5-for-43 (.116) with two home runs and three RBI.

Hinds was again optioned to Triple-A Louisville to begin the 2026 season. He made 12 appearances for Cincinnati, going 4-for-33 (.121) with five RBI and one walk. On May 17, 2026, Hinds was designated for assignment by the Reds.

=== Miami Marlins ===
On May 21, 2026, the Reds traded Hinds to the Miami Marlins in exchange for Zach McCambley. Hinds made one appearance for the Marlins, going 0–for–2; the remainder of his time was spent with the Triple–A Jacksonville Jumbo Shrimp, slashing .232/.295/.416 with six home runs, 17 RBI, and five stolen bases.

=== Baltimore Orioles ===
On August 3, 2026, Hinds was traded to the Baltimore Orioles in exchange for cash considerations. He appeared in 12 games for Baltimore, going 5–for–28 (.179) with one RBI and four walks. The Orioles re–signed Hinds to a one-year contract on October 30. Hinds was released by Baltimore on November 17, in order to pursue an opportunity in South Korea.
