= Chase Petty =

American baseball player (born 2003)

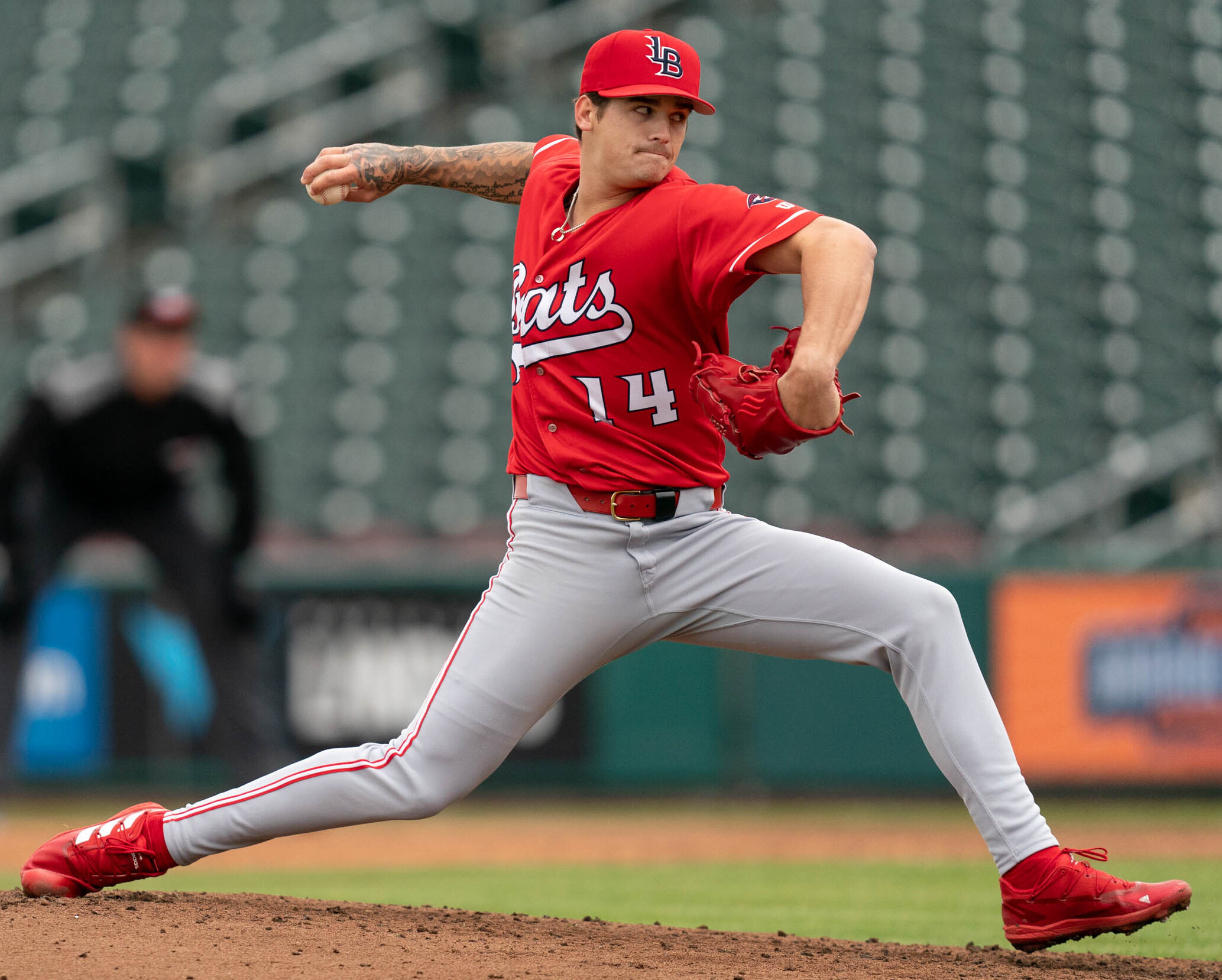
- Petty with the Louisville Bats in 2025

Cincinnati Reds – No. 61
- Pitcher
- Born: April 4, 2003 (age 23); Camden, New Jersey, U.S.
- Bats: Right Throws: Right

MLB debut
- April 30, 2025, for the Cincinnati Reds

MLB statistics (through 2026 season)
- Win–loss record: 1–5
- Earned run average: 7.17
- Strikeouts: 22
- Stats at Baseball Reference

Teams
- Cincinnati Reds (2025–present)

Chase Robert Petty (born April 4, 2003) is an American professional baseball pitcher for the Cincinnati Reds of Major League Baseball (MLB). He was selected by the Minnesota Twins in the first round of the 2021 MLB draft. He was traded to the Reds in 2022 and made his MLB debut in 2025.

== Early life and amateur career ==
Petty grew up in Millville, New Jersey, and then Somers Point, New Jersey at age 14. He attended Mainland Regional High School. He committed to play college baseball at the University of Florida during his sophomore year. Petty's junior season was canceled due to COVID-19, after which he focused on physical training and increased his fastball velocity to 100 miles per hour (160 km/h). As a senior, he was named the New Jersey Gatorade Player of the Year after pitching to a 6–1 win–loss record with a 1.00 earned run average (ERA) and 99 strikeouts in 48 2/3 innings pitched.

== Professional career ==
=== Minnesota Twins ===
Petty was selected with the 26th overall pick in the 2021 Major League Baseball draft by the Minnesota Twins. He signed with the team on July 26, 2021, and received a $2.5 million signing bonus. Petty made two appearances (one start) for the rookie-level Florida Complex League Twins, recording a 5.40 ERA with six strikeouts over five innings of work.

=== Cincinnati Reds ===
On March 13, 2022, the Twins traded Petty to the Cincinnati Reds in exchange for Sonny Gray and Francis Peguero. He opened the season with the Single-A Daytona Tortugas. Petty was promoted to the High-A Dayton Dragons after going 0–4 record with a 3.18 ERA and 60 strikeouts in 17 appearances with 12 starts at Daytona; in seven outings for Dayton, he pitched to a 1-2 record and 4.40 ERA with 33 strikeouts.

Petty split the 2023 campaign between Dayton and the Double-A Chattanooga Lookouts, accumulating an 0-2 record and 1.72 ERA with 66 strikeouts over 68 innings of work. In 2024, pitching primarily for Double-A Chattanooga, Petty posted a 4.20 ERA and an 11-5 record with 130 strikeouts.

On April 30, 2025, Petty was selected to the 40-man roster and promoted to the major leagues for the first time. He made three appearances (two starts) for the Reds during his rookie campaign, but struggled to an 0-3 record and 19.50 ERA with seven strikeouts over six innings of work.

Petty was optioned to Triple-A Louisville to begin the 2026 season. On June 13, 2026, Petty recorded his first career win, tossing 1 1/3 scoreless innings of relief against the Arizona Diamondbacks.
