= Luis Mey =

Dominican baseball player (born 2001)

Cincinnati Reds – No. 47
- Pitcher
- Born: June 24, 2001 (age 25); San Pedro de Macoris, Dominican Republic
- Bats: Right Throws: Right

MLB debut
- May 1, 2025, for the Cincinnati Reds

MLB statistics (through 2026 season)
- Win–loss record: 2–2
- Earned run average: 5.17
- Strikeouts: 71
- Stats at Baseball Reference

Teams
- Cincinnati Reds (2025–present)

Luis Ellison Mey (born June 24, 2001) is a Dominican professional baseball pitcher for the Cincinnati Reds of Major League Baseball (MLB). He made his MLB debut in 2025.

== Career ==
Mey signed with the Cincinnati Reds as an international free agent on July 2, 2018. He made his professional debut in 2019 with the rookie-level Arizona League Reds, struggling to an 0–5 record and 8.39 ERA in 13 games (12 starts). Mey did not play in a game in 2020 due to the cancellation of the minor league season because of the COVID-19 pandemic.

Mey returned to action in 2021, and spent the next three seasons with the Single-A Daytona Tortugas. In 54 appearances out of the bullpen, he posted an aggregate 5–4 record and 5.64 ERA with 86 strikeouts in 68 2/3 innings pitched. He returned to Daytona in 2022, logging a 4-1 record and 5.65 ERA with 58 strikeouts and two saves in 43 innings across 34 appearances. Mey made 14 relief outings for Daytona in 2023, his third consecutive season with the affiliate; he posted a 1-3 record and 5.40 ERA with 18 strikeouts and one save.

Mey split the 2024 campaign between the High–A Dayton Dragons and Double–A Chattanooga Lookouts, compiling a 2–5 record and 3.44 ERA with 63 strikeouts and 9 saves across 40 total appearances. He pitched in the Arizona Fall League and he was named the league's Reliever of the Year. Following the season, the Reds added Mey to their 40-man roster to protect him from the Rule 5 draft.

Mey was optioned to the Triple-A Louisville Bats to begin the 2025 season. On May 1, 2025, Mey was promoted to the major leagues for the first time. He recorded his first career win on May 17 after tossing a scoreless sixth inning against the Cleveland Guardians. Mey made 23 appearances for Cincinnati during his rookie campaign, compiling a 2-0 record and 3.43 ERA with 21 strikeouts over 21 innings of work.

Mey was again optioned to Triple-A Louisville to begin the 2026 season.
