= Noelvi Marte =

Dominican baseball player (born 2001)

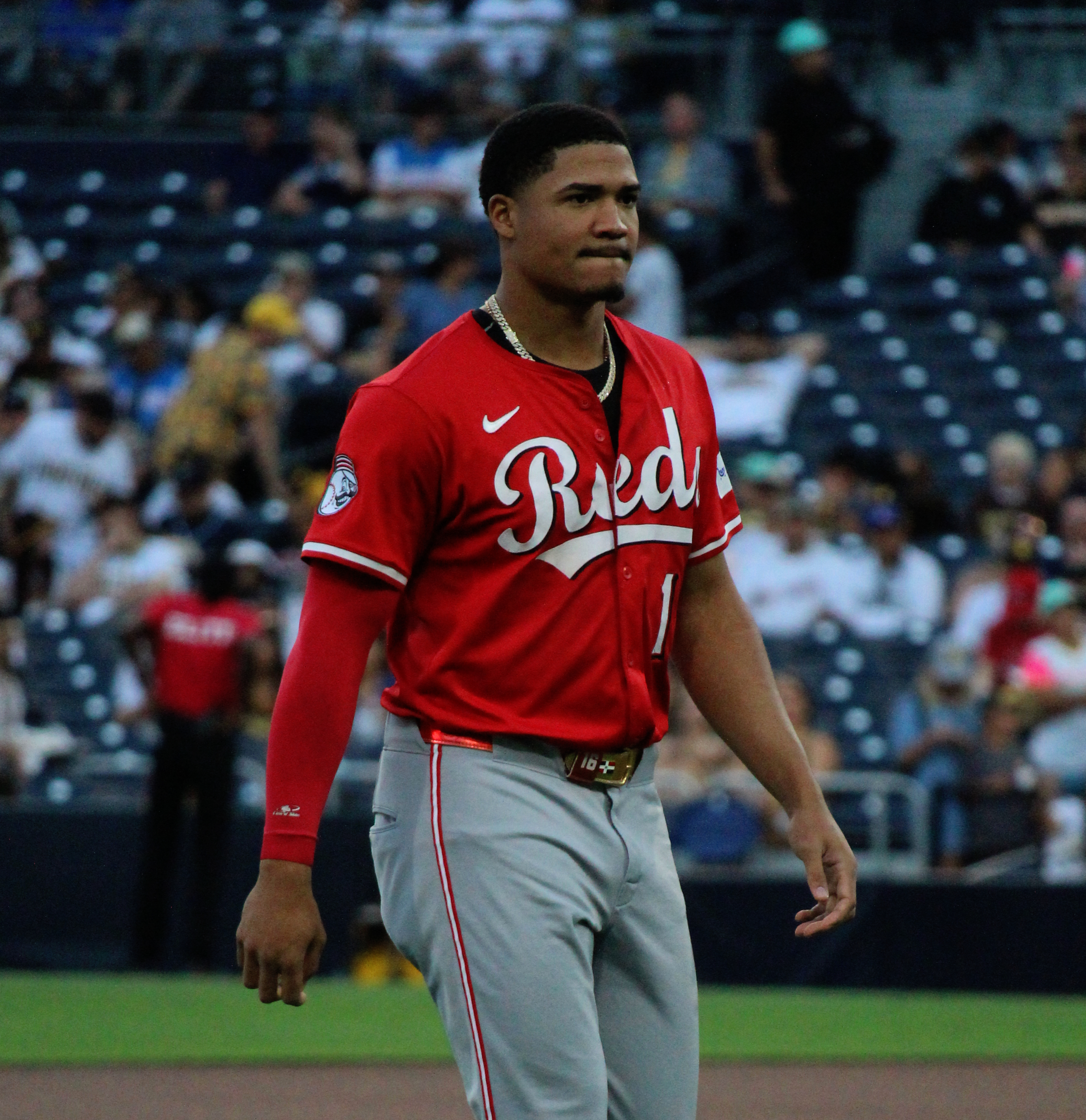
- Marte with the Cincinnati Reds in 2025

Cincinnati Reds – No. 4
- Third baseman / Outfielder
- Born: October 16, 2001 (age 24); Cotuí, Dominican Republic
- Bats: Right Throws: Right

MLB debut
- August 19, 2023, for the Cincinnati Reds

MLB statistics (through 2026 season)
- Batting average: .240
- Home runs: 27
- Runs batted in: 99
- Stats at Baseball Reference

Teams
- Cincinnati Reds (2023–present)

Noelvi Marte (born October 16, 2001) is a Dominican professional baseball third baseman and outfielder for the Cincinnati Reds of Major League Baseball (MLB). He made his MLB debut in 2023.

== Career ==
=== Seattle Mariners ===
Marte signed with the Seattle Mariners as an international free agent on July 2, 2018. He made his professional debut with the Dominican Summer League Mariners in 2019. In 65 games, he hit .309/.371/.511 with nine home runs and 54 runs batted in (RBI).

Marte did not play in a game in 2020 due to the cancellation of the minor league season because of the COVID-19 pandemic. He split the 2021 season between the Modesto Nuts and the Everett AquaSox, slashing .273/.366/.459 with 17 home runs, 71 RBI, 28 doubles and 24 stolen bases.

=== Cincinnati Reds ===
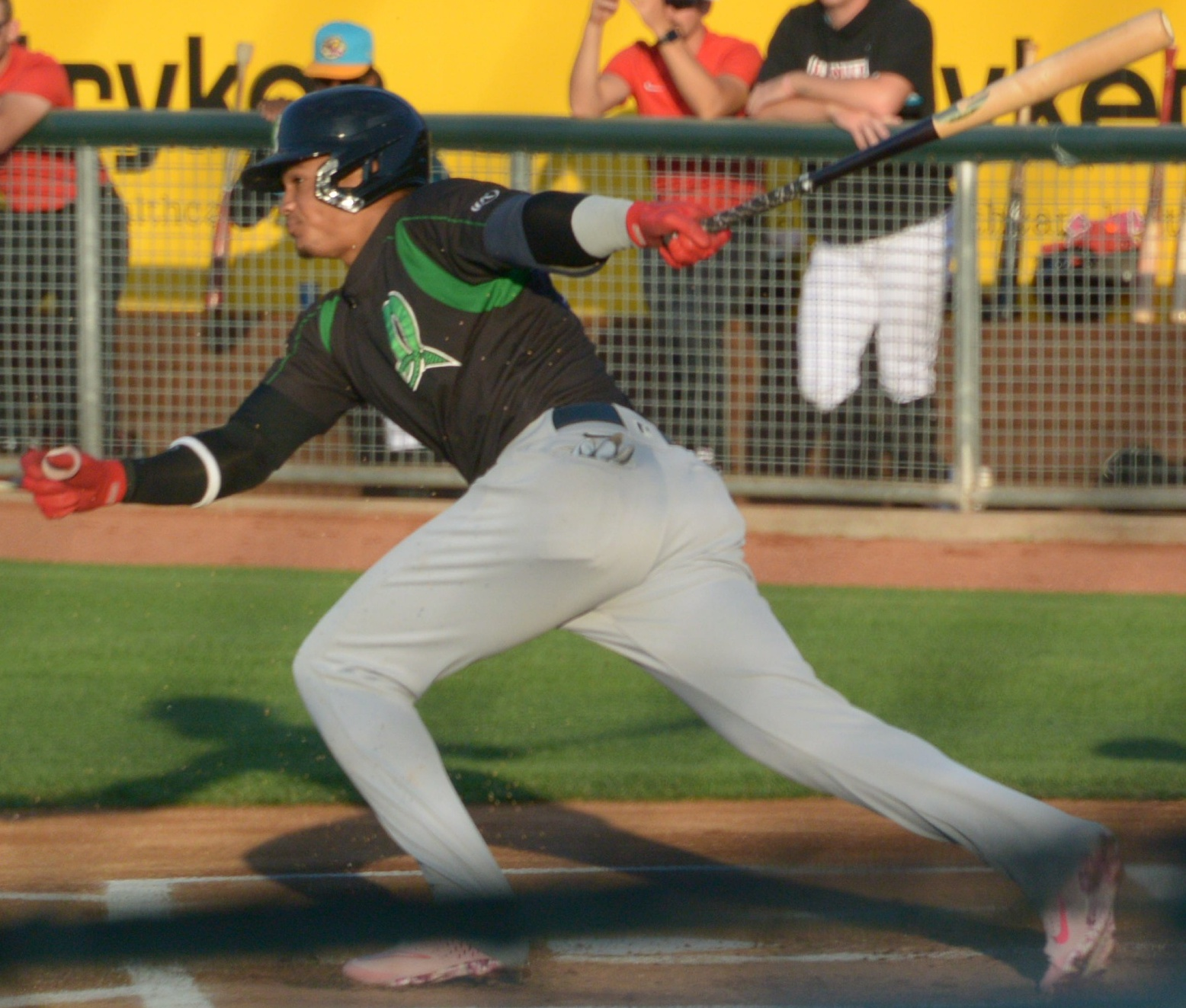
Marte with the Dayton Dragons in 2022

On July 29, 2022, the Mariners traded Marte, Edwin Arroyo, Andrew Moore, and Levi Stoudt to the Cincinnati Reds in exchange for Luis Castillo. The Reds subsequently assigned Marte to the High–A Dayton Dragons. On November 15, the Reds added Marte to their 40-man roster to protect him from the Rule 5 draft.

Marte was optioned to the Double-A Chattanooga Lookouts to begin the 2023 season. He played in 50 games for Chattanooga, hitting .281/.356/.464 with 8 home runs, 25 RBI, and 10 stolen bases. On June 26, 2023, Marte was promoted to the Triple–A Louisville Bats. On August 19, Marte was promoted to the major leagues for the first time. In 35 games during his rookie campaign, he batted .316/.366/.456 with three home runs, 15 RBI, and six stolen bases.

On March 8, 2024, it was announced that Marte received an 80-game suspension without pay after testing positive for Boldenone, a performance-enhancing substance. He was activated from his suspension on June 27. In 66 total appearances for the Reds, Marte slashed .210/.248/.301 with four home runs, 18 RBI, and nine stolen bases. Following the 2024 season, Marte played winter league baseball for the Gigantes del Cibao of the Dominican Professional Baseball League.

Marte was optioned to Triple-A Louisville to begin the 2025 season. On April 20, 2025, Marte hit his first career grand slam off Jorge Mateo of the Baltimore Orioles in a 24–2 blowout win.
