= Joe La Sorsa =

American baseball player (born 1998)

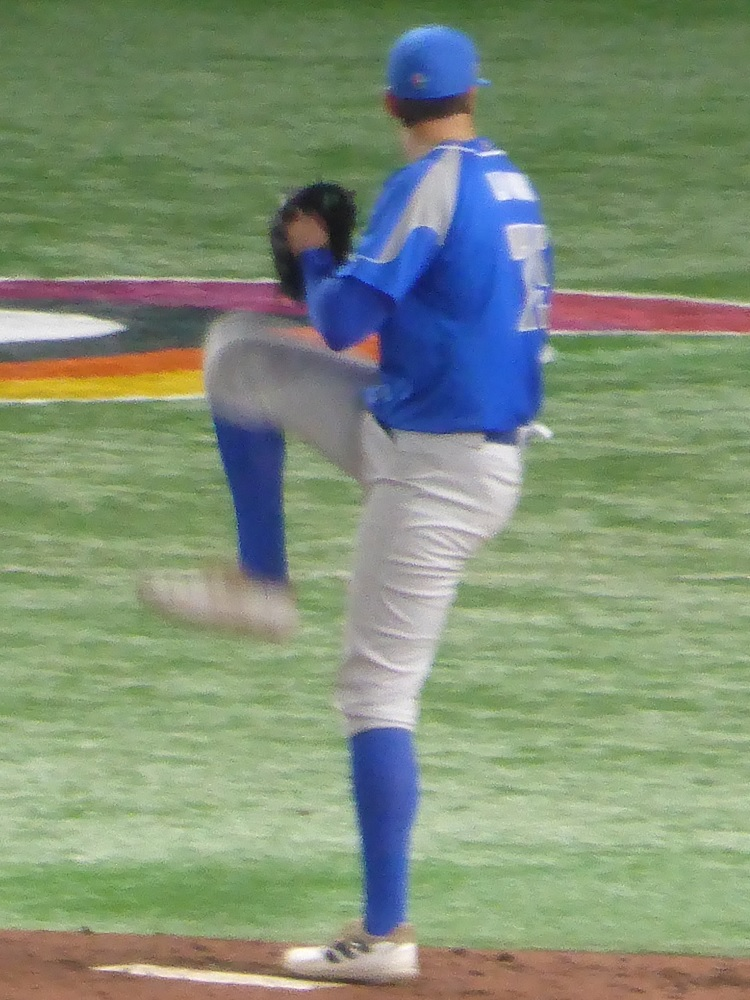
- La Sorsa with Team Italy in the 2023 WBC

Free agent
- Pitcher
- Born: April 29, 1998 (age 28); Mount Kisco, New York, U.S.
- Bats: Left Throws: Left

MLB debut
- May 29, 2023, for the Tampa Bay Rays

MLB statistics (through June 7, 2026)
- Win–loss record: 1–0
- Earned run average: 5.34
- Strikeouts: 45
- Stats at Baseball Reference

Teams
- Tampa Bay Rays (2023); Washington Nationals (2023–2024); Cincinnati Reds (2025); Boston Red Sox (2026)

Joseph Peter La Sorsa (born April 29, 1998) is an American professional baseball pitcher who is a free agent. He has previously played in Major League Baseball (MLB) for the Tampa Bay Rays, Washington Nationals, Cincinnati Reds, and Boston Red Sox. The Rays selected La Sorsa in the 19th round of the 2019 MLB draft, and he made his MLB debut with them in 2023.

== Amateur career ==
La Sorsa attended Iona Preparatory School in New Rochelle, New York, and played for the school's baseball team. In his senior year, he led Iona Prep's baseball team to the Catholic High School Athletic Association championship. He enrolled at St. John's University and played college baseball for the St. John's Red Storm. In 2018, he played collegiate summer baseball with the Harwich Mariners of the Cape Cod Baseball League, where he was 3-2 with a 5.79 ERA and pitched two innings of a combined no-hitter.

== Professional career ==
=== Tampa Bay Rays ===
The Tampa Bay Rays selected La Sorsa in the 19th round of the 2019 MLB draft. He made his professional debut that year with the Hudson Valley Renegades. He did not pitch professionally in 2020 due to the cancellation of the minor league season as a result of the COVID-19 pandemic. La Sorsa played for the Italian national baseball team in the 2023 World Baseball Classic.

La Sorsa was assigned to the Triple-A Durham Bulls in 2023, making nine appearances with a 3.86 earned run average. On May 28, 2023, the Rays selected his contract and promoted him to the major leagues for the first time. He made his major league debut the next day, pitching two scoreless innings with two strikeouts and a walk. On June 3, after he had pitched in one additional major league game, La Sorsa was designated for assignment following the activation of Shawn Armstrong from the injured list.

=== Washington Nationals ===
On June 8, 2023, the Nationals claimed La Sorsa off of waivers. He made four appearances for the Triple–A Rochester Red Wings before the Nationals promoted him to the major leagues. In 23 relief outings for the Nationals, La Sorsa recorded a 4.76 ERA with 25 strikeouts across 28 1/3 innings pitched. For Rochester, in 12 games he posted a 4.26 ERA with 14 strikeouts. He was removed from the 40–man roster and sent outright to Triple-A Rochester on December 1.

La Sorsa began the 2024 campaign with Rochester, compiling a 2.25 ERA with 41 strikeouts across 42 relief appearances. On August 17, 2024, the Nationals selected La Sorsa's contract, adding him to their active roster. In 16 games for Washington, he posted a 4.58 ERA with 14 strikeouts across 17 2/3 innings pitched.

On January 24, 2025, La Sorsa was designated for assignment by the Nationals following the signing of Shinnosuke Ogasawara. He was released by the organization on January 29.

=== Cincinnati Reds ===
On January 30, 2025, La Sorsa signed a minor league contract with the Cincinnati Reds. La Sorsa had his contract selected to the 40-man roster on June 3; he was subsequently optioned to Triple-A Louisville Bats. In five appearances for Cincinnati, he struggled to an 0-1 record and 10.80 ERA with two strikeouts across 6 2/3 innings pitched. La Sorsa was designated for assignment following the promotion of Reiver Sanmartín on September 2. He elected free agency rather than accept an outright assignment to Louisville on September 5.

=== New York Mets ===
On September 6, 2025, La Sorsa signed a minor league contract with the New York Mets organization. He made four scoreless appearances for the Triple-A Syracuse Mets, recording three strikeouts in four innings of work. La Sorsa elected free agency following the season on November 6.

=== Pittsburgh Pirates ===
On November 8, 2025, La Sorsa signed a minor league contract with the Pittsburgh Pirates. La Sorsa made 22 appearances (including two starts) for the Triple-A Indianapolis Indians, compiling a 1-1 record and 3.46 ERA with 22 strikeouts over 26 innings of work.

=== Boston Red Sox ===
On June 4, 2026, La Sorsa was traded to the Boston Red Sox in exchange for cash considerations. The following day, Boston selected La Sorsa's contract, adding him to their active roster. He made one appearance for the Red Sox on June 7, allowing one run across 1/3 of an inning. La Sorsa was released by Boston on August 6.
