= Brian Van Belle =

American baseball player (born 1997)

Tampa Bay Rays
- Pitcher
- Born: September 3, 1996 (age 29); Pembroke Pines, Florida, U.S.
- Bats: Right Throws: Right

MLB debut
- August 24, 2025, for the Tampa Bay Rays

MLB statistics (through 2025 season)
- Win–loss record: 1–0
- Earned run average: 5.40
- Strikeouts: 6
- Stats at Baseball Reference

Teams
- Tampa Bay Rays (2025)

Brian Michael Van Belle (born September 3, 1996) is an American professional baseball pitcher in the Tampa Bay Rays organization.

== Amateur career ==
Van Belle attended Archbishop McCarthy High School and played college baseball at Broward College and the University of Miami. As a senior with Miami, he posted a 2–0 win–loss record with a 0.68 earned run average (ERA) and 38 strikeouts in a shortened 2020 season. After going undrafted in the 2020 Major League Baseball draft, Van Belle signed with the Boston Red Sox as a free agent.

== Professional career ==
=== Boston Red Sox ===
Van Belle made his professional debut in 2021 with the High-A Greenville Drive, posting a 4.10 ERA with 82 strikeouts in 18 starts. He split the 2022 campaign between Greenville and the Double-A Portland Sea Dogs. In 28 games for the two affiliates, he compiled a 9–6 record and 5.31 ERA with 135 strikeouts. Van Belle split the 2023 season between Portland and the Triple-A Worcester Red Sox, totaling a 4.46 ERA with 134 strikeouts in 27 games. With Worcester in 2024, he recorded a 4.42 ERA in 30 appearances.

To begin the 2025 season, Van Belle was assigned to Worcester, posting a 2.29 ERA with 41 strikeouts in 12 appearances. On June 9, he was selected to Boston's 40-man roster and promoted to the major leagues for the first time. On June 11, Van Belle was designated for assignment without making an appearance, becoming a phantom ballplayer.

=== Cincinnati Reds ===
On June 14, 2025, Van Belle was traded to the Cincinnati Reds in exchange for cash considerations and optioned to the Triple-A Louisville Bats. In seven appearances with Louisville, he accumulated a 4.95 ERA with 31 strikeouts across 36 1/3 innings pitched.

=== Tampa Bay Rays ===
On July 30, 2025, the Reds traded Van Belle to the Tampa Bay Rays, along with Adam Serwinowski, in exchange for Zack Littell. In three starts for the Triple-A Durham Bulls, he tallied a 3-0 record and 2.04 ERA with 16 strikeouts across 17 2/3 innings pitched. On August 22, the Rays promoted Van Belle to the major leagues. In four appearances for Tampa Bay, he logged a 1-0 record and 5.40 ERA with six strikeouts across 8 1/3 innings pitched. On September 6, Van Belle was placed on the injured list due to right elbow inflammation. He was transferred to the 60-day injured list on September 9, officially ending his season. Van Belle was designated for assignment by the Rays on November 6. He cleared waivers and was sent outright to Durham on November 13. Van Belle was released by the Rays organization on December 17.

On January 7, 2026, Van Belle re-signed with the Rays on a two-year minor league contract. On March 21, 2026, he was placed on the full-season injured list officially ending his season before it began.
