= Lyon Richardson =

American baseball player (born 2000)

SSG Landers
- Pitcher
- Born: January 18, 2000 (age 26); Jensen Beach, Florida, U.S.
- Bats: Right Throws: Right

MLB debut
- August 6, 2023, for the Cincinnati Reds

MLB statistics (through 2026 season)
- Win–loss record: 0–6
- Earned run average: 6.48
- Strikeouts: 47
- Stats at Baseball Reference

Teams
- Cincinnati Reds (2023–2026); Milwaukee Brewers (2026)

Lyon Richardson (born January 18, 2000) is an American professional baseball pitcher for the SSG Landers of the KBO League. He has previously played in Major League Baseball (MLB) for the Cincinnati Reds and Milwaukee Brewers.

== Amateur career ==
Richardson attended Jensen Beach High School in Jensen Beach, Florida. He committed to play college baseball at the University of Florida. As a senior in 2018, he went 7–0 with a 0.58 ERA and ninety strikeouts over 48 innings alongside batting .369, and was named the Treasure Coast Newspapers Player of the Year.

== Professional career ==
=== Cincinnati Reds ===
Richardson was selected by the Cincinnati Reds in the second round (47th overall) of the 2018 Major League Baseball draft. Richardson signed with the Reds and made his professional debut that year with the Greeneville Reds of the Rookie-level Appalachian League. Over 29 innings, he compiled a 0–5 record and a 7.14 ERA.

In 2019, his first full minor league season, Richardson played with the Dayton Dragons of the Single-A Midwest League, going 3–9 with a 4.15 ERA and a 1.41 WHIP over 26 starts. After the cancellation of the 2020 minor league season due to the COVID-19 pandemic, he flew to Palm Beach Gardens, Florida, and spent the summer working out at Cressey Sports Performance, participating in simulated games with fellow minor leaguers. In September, he was added to Cincinnati's 60-man player pool and participated in their instructional league. Richardson was assigned to Dayton, now members of the High-A Central, for the 2021 season; he appeared in 19 games (18 starts) in which he went 2–5 with a 5.09 ERA, 91 strikeouts, and 38 walks over 76 innings. Following the season's end, he underwent Tommy John surgery, and thus missed all of the 2022 season.

On November 15, 2022, the Reds selected Richardson's contract and added him to the 40-man roster. Richardson split minor league time in 2023 between the Daytona Tortugas, the Chattanooga Lookouts, and the Louisville Bats. On August 6, Richardson was called up to the major leagues for the first time to make his MLB debut. He made 4 starts for the Reds, struggling to an 8.64 ERA with 13 strikeouts across 16 2/3 innings pitched.

Richardson was optioned to Triple–A Louisville to begin the 2024 season. He made one appearance for Cincinnati, allowing two runs on two hits with one strikeout in 2/3 of an inning pitched against the Chicago Cubs.

Richardson was again optioned to Triple-A Louisville to begin the 2025 season. He made 34 appearances for Cincinnati during the regular season, posting an 0-3 record and 4.54 ERA with 30 strikeouts across 37 2/3 innings pitched. On December 27, 2025, Richardson was designated for assignment following the acquisition of Dane Myers. He cleared waivers and was sent outright to Louisville on January 7, 2026.

On May 30, 2026, the Reds selected Richardson's contract, adding him to their active roster. He made two appearances for the team, but struggled to an 0-1 record and 27.00 ERA with three strikeouts across 1 2/3 innings pitched. On June 2, Richardson was designated for assignment by Cincinnati. He elected free agency two days later after clearing waivers.

=== Milwaukee Brewers ===
On June 10, 2026, Richardson signed a minor league contract with the Milwaukee Brewers. In 13 appearances (including three starts) for the Triple–A Nashville Sounds, he logged a 1–2 record and 4.20 ERA with 28 strikeouts over 30 innings of work. On August 8, the Brewers selected Richardson's contract, adding him to their active roster. He made his team debut two days later, recording 1 2/3 scoreless innings of relief against the San Diego Padres. On August 11, Richardson was designated for assignment by the Brewers. He cleared waivers and elected free agency on August 13, however quickly re-signed with the Brewers on a new minor league contract the following day. Richardson was assigned back to Nashville and finished a 2–2 record, a 4.23 ERA, and 45 strikeouts across a total of 22 games with the team. On September 23, the Brewers selected Richardson's contract, adding him back to their active roster. On September 30, he elected free agency.

=== SSG Landers ===
On November 11, 2026, Richardson signed with the SSG Landers of the KBO League.
