= Will Banfield =

American baseball player (born 1999)

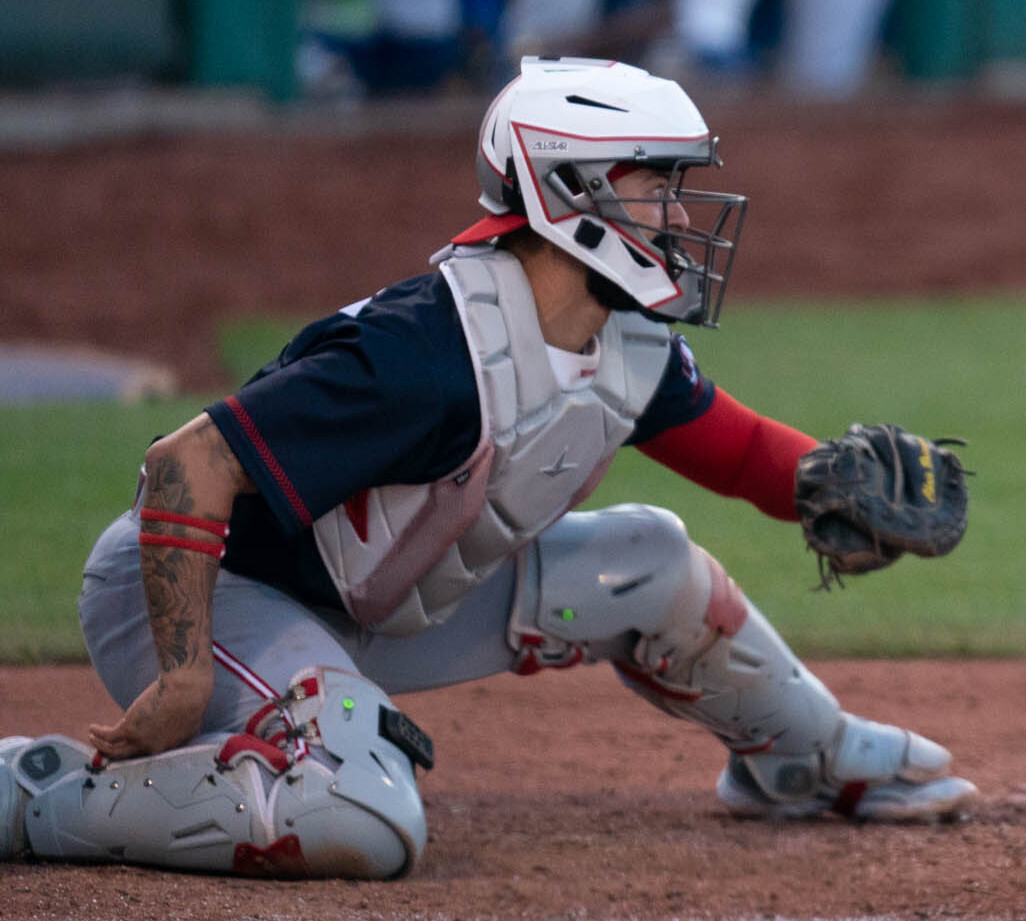
- Banfield with the Louisville Bats in 2026

Cincinnati Reds – No. 60
- Catcher
- Born: November 18, 1999 (age 26); Lawrenceville, Georgia, U.S.
- Bats: Right Throws: Right

MLB debut
- August 23, 2025, for the Cincinnati Reds

MLB statistics (through 2026 season)
- Batting average: .133
- Home runs: 0
- Runs batted in: 1
- Stats at Baseball Reference

Teams
- Cincinnati Reds (2025–present)

William Frank Banfield (born November 18, 1999) is an American professional baseball catcher for the Cincinnati Reds of Major League Baseball (MLB). He made his MLB debut in 2025.

== Career ==
=== Miami Marlins ===
Banfield attended Brookwood High School in Snellville, Georgia. He was selected by the Miami Marlins in the second round (69th overall) of the 2018 Major League Baseball draft. Banfield split his first professional season between the rookie-level Gulf Coast League Marlins and Single-A Greensboro Grasshoppers. In 2019, he made 101 appearances for the Single-A Clinton LumberKings, slashing .199/.252/.310 with nine home runs and 55 RBI.

Banfield did not play in a game in 2020 due to the cancellation of the minor league season because of the COVID-19 pandemic. He returned to action in 2021 with the High-A Beloit Snappers, hitting .180/.258/.308 with six home runs and 42 RBI over 67 games. Banfield made 102 appearances split between Beloit and the Double-A Pensacola Blue Wahoos in 2022, slashing a cumulative .223/.258/.366 with 11 home runs and 52 RBI.

Banfield made 115 appearances for Pensacola during the 2023 season, batting .258/.302/.472 with 23 home runs and 76 RBI. He spent the 2024 campaign with the Triple-A Jacksonville Jumbo Shrimp, playing in 93 games and batting .247/.296/.379 with nine home runs and 41 RBI. Banfield elected free agency following the season on November 4, 2024.

=== Cincinnati Reds ===
On November 22, 2024, Banfield signed a minor league contract with the Cincinnati Reds organization. He played in 72 games for the Triple-A Louisville Bats, hitting .220/.277/.304 with two home runs and 23 RBI. On August 20, 2025, Banfield was selected to the 40-man roster and promoted to the major leagues for the first time. He made seven appearances for the Reds during his rookie campaign, going 1-for-10 (.100). On November 21, Banfield was non-tendered by Cincinnati and became a free agent.

On December 2, 2025, Banfield re-signed with the Reds organization on a minor league contract. On June 18, 2026, Cincinnati added Banfield to their 40–man roster and optioned him to Triple-A Louisville.
