= Christian Encarnacion-Strand =

American baseball player (born 1999)

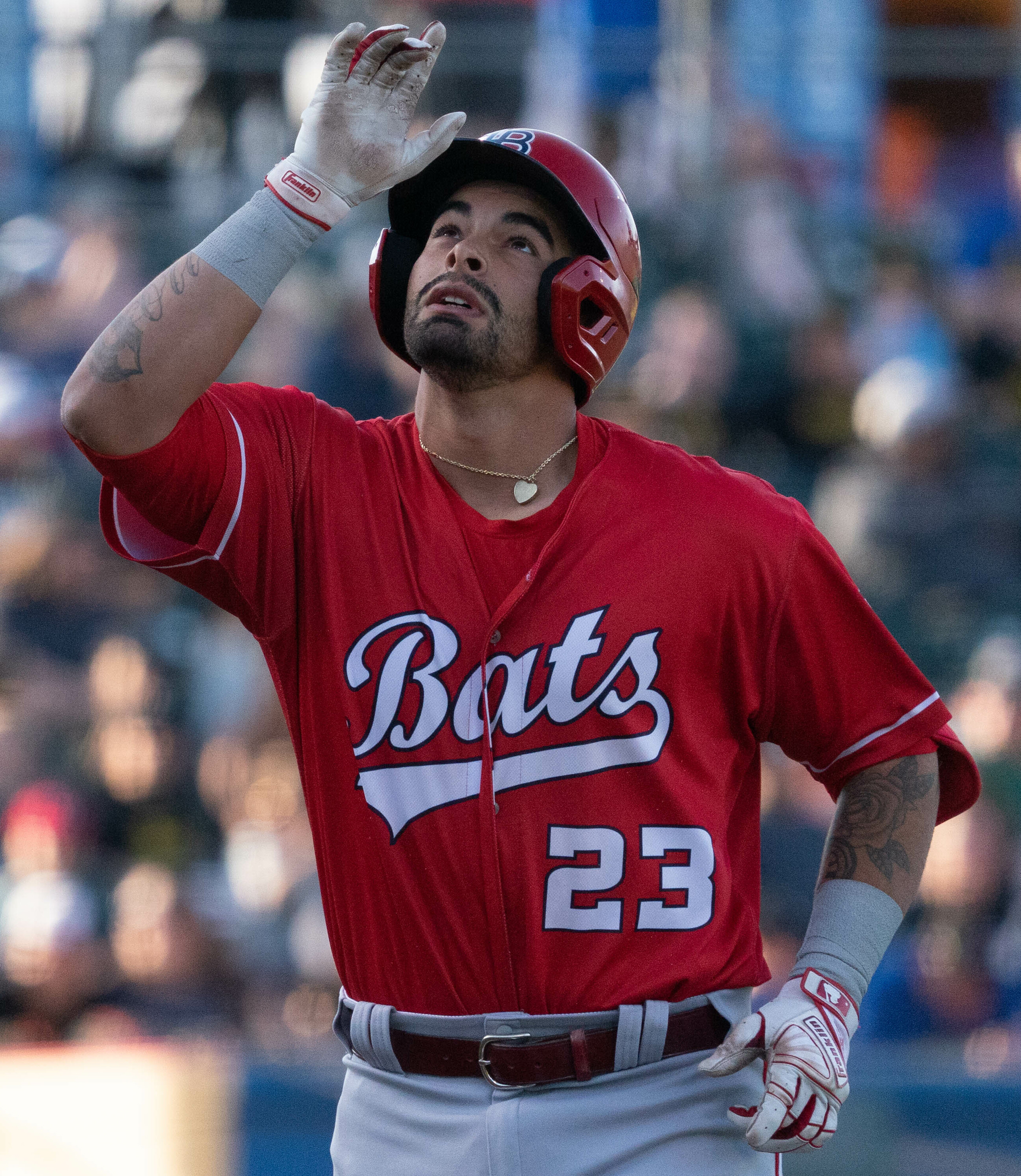
- Encarnacion-Strand with the Louisville Bats in 2023

Baltimore Orioles – No. 32
- First baseman / Third baseman
- Born: December 1, 1999 (age 26); Walnut Creek, California, U.S.
- Bats: Right Throws: Right

MLB debut
- July 17, 2023, for the Cincinnati Reds

MLB statistics (through 2026 season)
- Batting average: .246
- Home runs: 32
- Runs batted in: 111
- Stats at Baseball Reference

Teams
- Cincinnati Reds (2023–2025); Baltimore Orioles (2026–present)

Christian Lee Encarnacion-Strand (born December 1, 1999) is an American professional baseball first baseman and third baseman for the Baltimore Orioles of Major League Baseball (MLB). He has previously played in MLB for the Cincinnati Reds.

== Early life and amateur career ==
Encarnacion-Strand grew up in Pleasant Hill, California and attended College Park High School. As a senior, he was named the Diablo Athletic League Foothill Division most valuable player after batting .455 with 40 hits and 27 RBIs.

Encarnacion-Strand began his college baseball career at Yavapai College. As a freshman, he was named the Arizona Community College Athletic Conference Player of the Year after he batted .402 and led the conference with 22 home runs and 70 RBIs. Encarnacion-Strand was selected in the 34th round of the 2019 Major League Baseball draft by the Seattle Mariners but did not sign with the team. He was hitting .430 with 11 home runs and 33 RBIs in 25 games as a sophomore before the 2020 season was cut short due to the COVID-19 pandemic. Encarnacion-Strand then transferred to Oklahoma State University. In his only season with the Oklahoma State Cowboys, he batted .361 with 15 home runs and 66 RBIs and was named the Big 12 Conference Newcomer of the Year in 2021.

== Professional career ==
=== Minnesota Twins ===
The Minnesota Twins selected Encarnacion-Strand in the fourth round of the 2021 Major League Baseball draft. He was assigned to the Fort Myers Mighty Mussels of Low-A Southeast after signing with the team. Encarnacion-Strand began the 2022 season with the Cedar Rapids Kernels of the High-A Midwest League. He slashed .296/.370/.599 with 20 home runs and 68 RBI in 74 games with Cedar Rapids before being promoted to the Double-A Wichita Wind Surge.

=== Cincinnati Reds ===
On August 2, 2022, the Twins traded Encarnacion-Strand, Spencer Steer, and Steve Hajjar to the Cincinnati Reds in exchange for pitcher Tyler Mahle. The Reds assigned Encarnacion-Strand to the Double-A Chattanooga Lookouts. In 2022 in the minor leagues he batted .304/.368/.587 in 484 at bats, and was tied for second-most in the minor leagues in RBI with 114, behind Matt Mervis.

Encarnacion-Strand was assigned to the Triple-A Louisville Bats to begin the 2023 season, where he played in 67 games and hit .331/.405/.637 with 20 home runs and 62 RBI. On July 17, 2023, he was selected to the 40-man roster and promoted to the major leagues for the first time. In 63 games during his rookie campaign, Encarnacion-Strand batted .270/.328/.477 with 13 home runs and 37 RBI.

Encarnacion-Strand began the 2024 campaign as Cincinnati's primary first baseman. He hit .190 with two home runs and 16 RBI in 29 games before he was placed on the injured list with a right ulnar styloid fracture on May 8, 2024. Encarnacion-Strand was transferred to the 60-day injured list on June 17.

On July 2, 2025, Encarnacion-Strand hit his first career grand slam off of Greg Weissert of the Boston Red Sox. He made 36 appearances for Cincinnati during the year, batting .208/.234/.377 with six home runs and 19 RBI.

Encarnacion-Strand was optioned to Triple-A Louisville to begin the 2026 season. After hitting .222 across 10 games for Louisville, he was designated for assignment by the Reds on April 8.

=== Baltimore Orioles ===
On April 13, 2026, Encarnacion-Strand was traded to the Baltimore Orioles in exchange for cash considerations.
