= 2024 St. Louis Cardinals season =

Major League Baseball season

2024 St. Louis Cardinals
- League: National League
- Division: Central
- Ballpark: Busch Stadium
- City: St. Louis, Missouri
- Record: 83–79 (.512)
- Divisional place: 2nd
- Owners: William DeWitt Jr.
- President: Bill DeWitt III
- General managers: Mike Girsch
- Managers: Oliver Marmol
- Television: Bally Sports Midwest (Chip Caray, Tom Ackerman, Jim Edmonds, Brad Thompson)
- Radio: KMOX NewsRadio 1120; St. Louis Cardinals Radio Network (John Rooney, Rick Horton, Mike Claiborne)
- Stats: ESPN.com; Baseball Reference

The 2024 St. Louis Cardinals season was the 143rd season for the St. Louis Cardinals, a Major League Baseball franchise in St. Louis, Missouri. It was the 133rd season for the Cardinals in the National League and their 19th at Busch Stadium III.

The Cardinals improved on their 71–91 record from the previous season, but on September 20, they were eliminated from postseason contention.

== Season standings ==
=== National League Central ===
NL Central
Team	W	L	Pct.	GB	Home	Road
Milwaukee Brewers	93	69	.574	—	47‍–‍34	46‍–‍35
St. Louis Cardinals	83	79	.512	10	44‍–‍37	39‍–‍42
Chicago Cubs	83	79	.512	10	44‍–‍37	39‍–‍42
Cincinnati Reds	77	85	.475	16	39‍–‍42	38‍–‍43
Pittsburgh Pirates	76	86	.469	17	39‍–‍42	37‍–‍44

=== National League Wild Card ===
Division leaders
Team	W	L	Pct.
Los Angeles Dodgers	98	64	.605
Philadelphia Phillies	95	67	.586
Milwaukee Brewers	93	69	.574

Wild Card teams (Top 3 teams qualify for postseason)
Team	W	L	Pct.	GB
San Diego Padres	93	69	.574	+4
Atlanta Braves	89	73	.549	—
New York Mets	89	73	.549	—
Arizona Diamondbacks	89	73	.549	—
St. Louis Cardinals	83	79	.512	6
Chicago Cubs	83	79	.512	6
San Francisco Giants	80	82	.494	9
Cincinnati Reds	77	85	.475	12
Pittsburgh Pirates	76	86	.469	13
Washington Nationals	71	91	.438	18
Miami Marlins	62	100	.383	27
Colorado Rockies	61	101	.377	28

=== Record vs. opponents ===
==== Record vs. National League ====
2024 National League record Source: MLB Standings Grid – 2024
Team	AZ	ATL	CHC	CIN	COL	LAD	MIA	MIL	NYM	PHI	PIT	SD	SF	STL	WSH	AL
Arizona	—	2–5	3–3	5–1	9–4	6–7	4–2	4–3	3–4	4–3	4–2	6–7	7–6	3–3	5–1	24–22
Atlanta	5–2	—	4–2	2–4	3–3	2–5	9–4	2–4	7–6	7–6	3–3	3–4	4–3	2–4	5–8	31–15
Chicago	3–3	2–4	—	5–8	4–2	4–2	4–3	5–8	3–4	2–4	7–6	2–4	3–4	6–7	6–1	27–19
Cincinnati	1–5	4–2	8–5	—	6–1	4–3	5–2	4–9	2–4	4–3	5–8	2–4	2–4	7–6	2–4	21–25
Colorado	4–9	3–3	2–4	1–6	—	3–10	2–5	4–3	2–4	2–4	2–4	8–5	3–10	3–4	2–4	20–26
Los Angeles	7–6	5–2	2–4	3–4	10–3	—	5–1	4–3	4–2	1–5	4–2	5–8	9–4	5–2	4–2	30–16
Miami	2–4	4–9	3–4	2–5	5–2	1–5	—	4–2	6–7	6–7	0–7	2–4	3–3	3–3	2–11	19–27
Milwaukee	3–4	4–2	8–5	9–4	3–4	3–4	2–4	—	5–1	2–4	7–6	2–5	4–2	8–5	2–4	31–15
New York	4–3	6–7	4–3	4–2	4–2	2–4	7–6	1–5	—	6–7	5–2	5–2	2–4	4–2	11–2	24–22
Philadelphia	3–4	6–7	4–2	3–4	4–2	5–1	7–6	4–2	7–6	—	3–4	5–1	5–2	4–2	9–4	26–20
Pittsburgh	2–4	3–3	6–7	8–5	4–2	2–4	7–0	6–7	2–5	4–3	—	0–6	2–4	5–8	4–3	20–26
San Diego	7–6	4–3	4–2	4–2	5–8	8–5	4–2	5–2	2–5	1–5	6–0	—	7–6	3–4	6–0	27–19
San Francisco	6–7	3–4	4–3	4–2	10–3	4–9	3–3	2–4	4–2	2–5	4–2	6–7	—	1–5	4–3	23–23
St. Louis	3–3	4–2	7–6	6–7	4–3	2–5	3–3	5–8	2–4	2–4	8–5	4–3	5–1	—	4–3	24–22
Washington	1–5	8–5	1–6	4–2	4–2	2–4	11–2	4–2	2–11	4–9	3–4	0–6	3–4	3–4	—	21–25

Updated with the results of all games through September 30, 2024.

==== Record vs. American League ====
2024 National League record vs. American League Source: MLB Standings
Team	BAL	BOS	CWS	CLE	DET	HOU	KC	LAA	MIN	NYY	OAK	SEA	TB	TEX	TOR
Arizona	1–2	3–0	2–1	3–0	1–2	1–2	2–1	2–1	1–2	1–2	2–1	1–2	0–3	2–2	2–1
Atlanta	1–2	3–1	1–2	2–1	3–0	3–0	2–1	2–1	3–0	2–1	2–1	1–2	2–1	2–1	2–1
Chicago	3–0	1–2	4–0	0–3	2–1	3–0	2–1	2–1	2–1	1–2	1–2	2–1	1–2	1–2	2–1
Cincinnati	0–3	1–2	3–0	1–3	0–3	3–0	0–3	3–0	2–1	3–0	1–2	0–3	1–2	1–2	2–1
Colorado	1–2	2–1	1–2	2–1	1–2	0–4	2–1	2–1	1–2	1–2	1–2	1–2	1–2	3–0	1–2
Los Angeles	2–1	3–0	3–0	2–1	1–2	1–2	2–1	2–2	2–1	2–1	2–1	3–0	2–1	1–2	2–1
Miami	2–1	0–3	2–1	1–2	2–1	0–3	1–2	0–3	2–1	1–2	1–2	2–1	1–3	1–2	3–0
Milwaukee	2–1	2–1	3–0	3–0	2–1	1–2	1–2	2–1	3–1	1–2	2–1	2–1	2–1	3–0	2–1
New York	2–1	3–0	3–0	0–3	1–2	1–2	2–1	1–2	2–1	4–0	1–2	0–3	0–3	2–1	2–1
Philadelphia	1–2	1–2	3–0	1–2	2–1	2–1	2–1	2–1	1–2	0–3	1–2	1–2	3–0	3–0	3–1
Pittsburgh	2–1	0–3	3–0	1–2	2–2	2–1	1–2	1–2	2–1	2–1	0–3	2–1	1–2	1–2	1–2
San Diego	2–1	2–1	3–0	2–1	2–1	2–1	2–1	0–3	2–1	1–2	3–0	1–3	2–1	2–1	1–2
San Francisco	2–1	1–2	2–1	1–2	2–1	2–1	3–0	1–2	2–1	0–3	2–2	1–2	1–2	2–1	1–2
St. Louis	3–0	2–1	1–2	2–1	1–2	1–2	1–3	2–1	2–1	2–1	2–1	1–2	2–1	2–1	0–3
Washington	2–2	1–2	1–2	1–2	2–1	2–1	0–3	2–1	1–2	2–1	1–2	2–1	1–2	1–2	2–1

Updated with the results of all games through September 30, 2024.

== Previous season ==
The Cardinals finished the 2023 season 71–91, which was good for a .438 winning percentage. The season was the first losing one for St. Louis since the 2007 season, and finishing twenty games below .500 resulted in the Cardinals finishing last in their division for the first time since the 1990 season. The Cardinals also missed the postseason for the first time since the 2018 season, snapping a four-year postseason appearance streak.

== Offseason ==
As announced before the start of the season, 42-year old Adam Wainwright retired after an 18-year career with the Cardinals, which included three All-Star selections, two Gold Gloves, a Silver Slugger, and four top-three Cy Young Award finishes. Despite struggling with both injury and performance his final season, Wainwright was able to join the 200 win club which he achieved through a 1–0 victory against the Milwaukee Brewers on September 18, 2023.

The team added former Cardinals' infielder Daniel Descalso (2010–14) as its new bench coach on November 20, 2023, replacing Joe McEwing who got a job in the front office, assisting president of baseball operations John Mozeliak.

To start the offseason, it was made clear by John Mozeliak that the Cardinals were looking to add two or three starting pitchers to the 2024 squad, either by trade or free agency. This objective was a result of the very poor performance of the team's pitching in 2023, who combined for the 7th-worst ERA in the league at 4.79, numerous injuries during the season, and the departing of several starters at the trade deadline and end of season, including Jordan Montgomery, Jack Flaherty, and Adam Wainwright.

On November 21, 2023, the team officially announced that former Cardinals' starter Lance Lynn, 36 (2011–15, 2017) will return in a one-year deal for $11 million, with performance incentives and a 2025 club option. The same day, the team signed Kyle Gibson, 36, a former Missouri Tigers college pitcher (2006) to a one-year deal for $12 million, also with a 2025 club option.

On November 27, 2023, it was announced by Jon Heyman on X and later confirmed by the club that starting pitcher Sonny Gray, 34, had been signed to a three-year deal for $75 million, which also includes a fourth-year 2027 club option that includes a $5 million buyout, and a no-trade clause. Gray had a spectacular 2023 campaign, which resulted in an 8–8 record over 32 starts with a 2.79 ERA, his third All-Star selection, and a 2nd-place finish in AL Cy Young voting. Later that day, Gray was officially introduced to media and signed.

On November 30, former Gold Glove catcher Yadier Molina turned down an offer from the Cardinals to be a full-time coach for the catchers because of family matters. It was thought it would have been beneficial for the young backup catcher, Iván Herrera, and Willson Contreras for help in game planning, and get familiar with the pitching staff. Molina could agree to be a full-time coach in 2025.

On December 5, the Cardinals in the second annual draft lottery for the 2024 Major League Baseball draft, will get the #7 draft pick that initially projected them with the #5 pick.

The Rule 5 draft on December 6, at the Winter Meetings, the Cardinals selected RHP Ryan Fernandez, 25, 6-ft, 0-in., 170-lbs., from Boston.

On the same day, retired Cardinals' Gold Glove catcher Yadier Molina agreed to be a Special Assistant to the president of baseball operations John Mozeliak. Mozeliak said in his explanation of his duties, "It's not going to be catching-specific, but that will be his forte. But if he can help pitchers or even spend time with coaches and share his wisdom, that's the point of this."

On December 8, the Cardinals traded frequently-injured OF'er Tyler O'Neill (72G in 2023, 96G in 2022) to the Boston for two pitchers: RH reliever Nick Robertson, 25 (6-ft. 6-in., 265-lbs.), and minor league RH prospect Victor Santos, 23 (6-ft. 1-in., 222-lbs). Robertson was added to the 40-man roster, while Santos will be assigned to a minor league roster later.

On December 11, the team finalized its coaching staff in adding a new coaching position, the Assistant Pitching Coach. They hired former Cardinals' LH reliever Dean Kiekhefer (2016). He was pitching coach for Single-A Palm Beach in 2021, and assistant pitching coordinator for player development in 2022 and 2023. The Cardinals have also promoted Daniel "DC" MacLea to the staff as the major league Coordinator, Technology and Systems. MacLea has been with the Cardinals since 2018, first as a performance specialist from 2018 to 2021 and then as technology integration coordinator for player development in 2022–23.

On January 5, 2024, the team acquired RH reliever Andrew Kittredge, 33 (34 on Mar 17) for corner OF'er Richie Palacios in a trade with the Tampa Bay Rays. Kittredge was 2–0, 3.09 ERA, 14 games, 6 GF, 1 Save, 2 BB, and 10 SO in 11.2 IP (1.200 WHIP). He was an All-Star in 2021, before missing parts of 2022 and 2023, returning in August 2023 from Tommy John surgery. He held opponents to a 0.683 O-OPS (0.300 O-OBP% + 0.383 O-SLG%), and a 0.255 O-BA in his 14 games.

On January 8, the Cardinals hired Chaim Bloom, 40, as an advisor to John Mozeliak. Bloom was the Boston Red Sox's chief baseball officer from 2019–2023. He will work under Mozeliak, advising on a variety of baseball operations areas. Mozeliak said in explaining the move, "I have known Chaim for a long time and feel that this is a great opportunity for the St. Louis Cardinals. It will be good to get an outside perspective of our organization from someone who is as well-respected as Chaim. Having a fresh set of eyes on all aspects of our baseball operations should be helpful." Before he became Boston's chief baseball officer, Bloom spent 15 years (2005–19) in the Tampa Bay Rays' baseball operations department, including the final three as the club's senior vice president of baseball operations.

On January 19, former Cardinals' player (2011–2021) LH-hitting Matt Carpenter, 38, signed a one-year deal for $740,000 to be a DH. In 2023, he hit .176 over 76 games with San Diego, then Carpenter was traded to the Atlanta Braves on December 15 before being released three days later. He was an NL All-Star in 2013, 2014 and 2016. To make room for him on the 40-man roster, the Cardinals transferred RH-reliever James Naile to the KIA Tigers of the Korea Baseball Organization for cash considerations. Carpenter will likely be in a battle with Alec Burleson and Luken Baker for the final spot on the 26-man roster.

On January 22, the Cardinals avoided arbitration with CF Tommy Edman, with a two-year deal worth a reported $16.5 million. "Tommy's strong fundamental play, athleticism and versatility remain a valuable asset that we view as an important part of our team identity," said president of baseball operations, John Mozeliak. Edman can now shift his focus to fully recovering from the arthroscopic surgery he had on his ailing right wrist following the 2023 season. He hit .248 with 13 home runs and a team-high 27 stolen bases in 2023, while making starts at shortstop (46), second base (40), center field (37) and right field (six). His stellar defensive versatility in 2023 made him a Gold Glove finalist for the third straight season. His 89 stolen bases over the past three seasons are tied for the second most in the Majors with Trea Turner and Starling Marte, behind only Ronald Acuña Jr. (119).

On February 3, the Cardinals signed free agent RH-reliever Keynan Middleton, 30, to a one-year reported $6 million contract, with a club option for 2025, for a possible $11 million total. The buyout for 2025 is $1 million. He struck out 17 batters in 14 1/3 innings and compiled a 1.88 ERA with the Yankees late last season. The Yankees acquired him from the Chicago White Sox just before the trade deadline last July. In his total of 51 games, he was 2–2 and a 3.38 ERA, with 64 strikeouts in 50.2 IP. His signing adds to the team's need for more swing-and-miss presence out of the bullpen.

== Spring training ==
The Cardinals signed veteran shortstop, free agent LH Brandon Crawford, 37, on February 27, on a one-year deal. As insurance behind rookie Masyn Winn, who hit .172 in 2023. Crawford spent his entire 13-year career with the San Francisco Giants, a three-time All-Star, and four-time Gold Glove winner. He is a career .250 hitter. Crawford batted .194 with a .273 on-base percentage in 2023, in an injury-marred season in which he played just 94 games. Crawford said about backing-up Winn, "I'm here to help him out any way I can and obviously help the team any way I can, also. That's what was appealing." The deal was worth a reported $2 million. To make room for Crawford on the 40-man roster, infielder Buddy Kennedy was designated for assignment.

On March 14, center fielder Tommy Edman will start the season on the IL due to lingering inflammation and swelling in his right wrist, recovering from wrist surgery in November 2023. He will soon be put on the 10-day IL. He is a former Gold Glove second baseman, was projected to be St. Louis' starting center fielder after playing 42 error-free games there late in the 2023 season. He had surgery on his right wrist in early October when the season ended, but he has yet to make much significant progress because of lingering inflammation and swelling. Edman, who recently got second and third opinions on the soundness of the wrist structurally, has yet to hit live pitching, and batting from the right side causes the most pain in his wrist. He signed a two-year extension in January. Dylan Carlson can stake his claim as St. Louis' Opening Day starter in center field. Rookie speedster Victor Scott II, who has gone from the No. 29 prospect in the Cardinals' system to No. 4, per MLB Pipeline could also compete for the position. Scott won a Gold Glove and stole 94 bases in the Minor Leagues in 2023. The Cardinals are already without Lars Nootbaar, the projected starting left fielder. He recently fractured two ribs on his left side while trying to make a twisting, turning catch in left field. His status for Opening Day remains unclear.

On March 15, the Cardinals extended manager's Oliver Marmol, 37, contract from the end of this year through 2026. Marmol's original three-year deal signed in late-2021 after replacing fired manager Mike Shildt was set to expire at season's end. President of Baseball Operations John Mozeliak said on why the sudden extension now, "We believe in them. To go into the season with a ... lame-duck manager just seemed to be the wrong strategy given the fact that with the roster we've assembled, we believe we're going to be competitive."

On March 16, manager Oliver Marmol announced that RH-reliever Keynan Middleton, 30, will be shut down for 10 days and start the season on the 15-day IL from his right forearm strain. Middleton last pitched on March 7, with lingering pain in his right arm for several days. Middleton was one of the Cardinals' two primary additions to the bullpen this offseason. His injury opens opportunities for newcomers Riley O'Brien, Ryan Fernandez, or Nick Robertson to potentially make the Opening Day roster. Fernandez is a Rule 5 pick and must stay on the roster all season or be offered back to the Red Sox should he clear waivers.

On March 17, manager Oliver Marmol announced that Sonny Gray will not make his scheduled Opening Day start on Thu. March 28, due to his right hamstring strain. Miles Mikolas will start against the Dodgers in Los Angeles. Mikolas is 0–2 in his Opening Day starts. Gray signed a three-year contract in November 2023, felt his right hamstring "grab at him" on March 4 in the second inning of a 1–0 loss. Unlike in 2022, when he suffered two hamstring injuries and tried to push through the pain, Gray immediately stopped and motioned for catcher Willson Contreras to come to the mound.

On March 23, the Cardinals reassigned outfielder Victor Scott II and infielder Cesar Prieto to minor-league camp before their game on Saturday, their second-to-last in spring training. Dylan Carlson will be the starting Center Fielder, while Tommy Edman recovers from wrist surgery, and placed on the IL. The team optioned RH-reliever Nick Robertson, first baseman Luken Baker, infielder/outfielder Alfonso Rivas III, and infielder/outfielder Jared Young to Triple-A Memphis. LH-reliever Zack Thompson will be the temporary fifth starter until Sonny Gray recovers from his hamstring strain and placed on the IL. OF Lars Nootbaar (fractured ribs) will also begin the season on the injured list as will RH-reliever Keynan Middleton. LH-reliever Matthew Liberatore made the roster and will be in the bullpen. After these moves, the team has 29 active and 11 inactive on the 40-man roster, with three more cuts needed to get to the 26-active roster. The team's final ST game will be on Sunday March 24, before two exhibition games in Arizona against the Cubs Monday and Tuesday, before their season opener on Thursday March 28 at Los Angeles.

While playing in center field in the second inning in the first of two games against the Cubs on March 25, Dylan Carlson sustained a left shoulder injury in a collision with right fielder Jordan Walker when both were chasing a fly ball. Victor Scott II will be the Opening Day center fielder after the team learned that Carlson will miss several weeks with a sprained AC joint in his left shoulder. An MRI exam on Monday (March 25) night revealed that Carlson sustained damage to his left shoulder after landing on the warning track after the collision. The team views the injury that will keep Carlson out for a few weeks and not months.

The final spring training game on March 26, was a 7–2 win over the Cubs at Sloan Park in Mesa, Arizona to sweep their two-game set, and finish the spring at 13–12–5. Kyle Gibson blitzed through the Cubs on Tuesday before the Cardinals continued their journey west toward Los Angeles and opening day at Dodger Stadium. Gibson struck out nine and allowed one run on four hits in five innings against the Cubs. Through the first seven innings, Cardinals pitchers had 14 strikeouts. As if completing the dress rehearsal for the season, closer Ryan Helsley came in to get the final outs of spring training. The team finalized their bullpen by optioning lefty John King to AAA Memphis. Ryan Fernandez, the team's Rule 5 pick from Boston, makes the opening day roster and will be part of the right-handed relief group out of the bullpen. The Cardinals also optioned catcher Pedro Pages and infielder Thomas Saggese to AAA Memphis. Lefty Drew Rom will go on injured list to start year. The Cardinals will not finalize their active roster for opening day until making one more move with the 40-player roster to clear a spot.

On March 27, OF Victor Scott II, 23, made the active roster, making the second-to-last move in the Cardinals' 26-player active roster. The team placed infielder Jared Young on outright waivers to clear the spot for Scott, who zooms from AA-Springfield to the starting center fielder. The team also optioned INF Jose Fermin to AAA-Memphis, to finalize the roster for Opening Day, Thursday, March 28, in Los Angeles against the Dodgers.

== Regular season ==
=== Opening Day ===
Opening Day starting lineup
No.	Player	Pos.
Batters
33	Brendan Donovan	LF
46	Paul Goldschmidt	1B
16	Nolan Gorman	2B
28	Nolan Arenado	3B
40	Willson Contreras	C
41	Alec Burleson	DH
18	Jordan Walker	RF
11	Victor Scott II	CF
0	Masyn Winn	SS
Starting pitcher
39	Miles Mikolas	

=== Summary ===
==== March / April ====
The Cardinals started the season, 1–3, on March 28, after dropping the first two games against the Dodgers in Los Angeles, before winning the third game, but lost the fourth game.

Traveling to San Diego, they won the first two games, before dropping the third to be 3–4. Opening Day at Busch Stadium on April 4, at the 3:15pm start time, with 47,273 in attendance, duration of game 2:47 (start time weather: 49 °F (9 °C), wind 15 mph (24 km/h) out to right field, Overcast but no precipitation), winning 8–5 against the Miami Marlins. Again winning the first two games (April 4, 6), then dropping the third game to start the first 10 games with an even 5–5 split. Losing the first game to the Phillies on April 8, in 10-innings in a tough 3–5 loss. Reliever John King was sent to AAA, to activate ace starter Sonny Gray on April 9. He won the second game against the Phillies in his first start of the season, 3–0, while on a strict 65-pitch limit to build up his arm strength after delayed 12 days from starting the season's March 28 opener, and 36 days since he last pitched in Spring Training on March 4, because of a strained right hamstring. He pitched the minimum of five innings for the win, facing 18 batters, on 64 pitches (43 strikes), giving up only five singles, striking out five, no walks, with five groundouts (plus two double plays) and two flyouts. Gray's sweeper—one he considers a slider, and the pitch that limited hitters to a .097 average in 2023, gave him his last two strikeouts. Closer Ryan Helsley earned his fourth save of the season after playing 12 games, with the win making the team returning to .500 at 6–6.

The Cardinals dropped the final game against the Phillies on April 10, 3–4; Team record now 6–7 (.462) 5th place (50 Runs, 55 Runs Against), last in the NL Central, trailing the Pirates by 3.5 games. On April 11, LF'er Lars Nootbaar was activated on the off-day, out since March 2, after fracturing two left ribs. Pedro_Pagés was optioned to AAA. This comes before a six-game West Coast trip, starting April 12–14 against Arizona, and then the final three games in Oakland against the Athletics (1968–2024) before their 2025 move to playing in Sutter Health Park in West Sacramento, California, for the 2025–2027 seasons, before their expected 2028 move to Las Vegas.

The team rallied late on April 12, at Arizona after blowing a 6–0 lead with Arizona tying it at Chase Field with a six-run fifth inning, but the Cardinals gave up no more for a 9–6 win. Nolan Arenado hit his first HR in 39 games stretching back to Aug 19, 2023, a three-run homer in the first inning. His best friend, who hit together and surf together throughout the offseason, is fellow Southern California native Lars Nootbaar. He played in his first game after recovering from fractured ribs, who slugged a key two-run HR in the third inning to build-up that initial 6–0 lead. Paul Goldschmidt singled in the lead run in the seventh, followed by Masyn Winn tripling in a run in the eighth, followed by Victor Scott II's sacrifice fly for the final run. Ryan Helsley recorded his fifth save with a perfect ninth, striking out two. The team evened its record at 7–7, 5th place (59–61 Runs-Runs Against), three games behind NL Central leaders Milwaukee 9–3, and Pittsburgh 10–4.

Sonny Gray won his second consecutive game and his 100th Career Win, 3–1, in front of 5,508 paid on April 15, in his first home park (Oakland Coliseum, July 10, 2013 – July 31, 2017), and the last time in Oakland. Now 11 years after his first start on Aug 15, 2013, with the Athletics. Still pitching within the confines of a 75-pitch limit, Gray went six scoreless innings, striking out six while scattering four hits. He has yet to issue a walk in his 11 scoreless innings. He joins current rotation mates Lance Lynn (136) and Kyle Gibson (105) in the group of 13 active pitchers who have reached the century mark in wins. The A's recently agreed to a three-year deal to play in Sacramento until the team's planned relocation in 2028 to Las Vegas.

Dorrel Norman Elvert Herzog, nicknamed 'Whitey' or 'The White Rat', manager from 1980 to July 6, 1990, died at 92 on April 15. He changed the direction of the Cardinals franchise in the early 1980s with an exciting style of play that would become known as "Whiteyball." He was elected to the National Baseball Hall of Fame by the veterans' committee in December 2009, and inducted the next July. He also was elected to the Cardinals' Hall of Fame and had his No. 24 retired. His record with the Cardinals was 822–728 (.530), and 21–16 (.538) in 37 post-season games. Won six divisional titles, three pennants (1982, 1985, and 1987), and the 1982 World Series win. Herzog had two 100-win seasons (1977 and 1985), won the 1982 MLB Mgr. of the Year Award, and the 1985 NL Mgr. of the Year Award, and ranks 39th all-time with 1,281 total wins. Herzog was the second-oldest living Hall of Famer. Willie Mays, also 92, was born on May 6, 1931, six months before Herzog. Herzog's family is planning a private celebration of life service after a period of grieving, and ask that any donations be made to Shriners Hospital for Children in St. Louis.

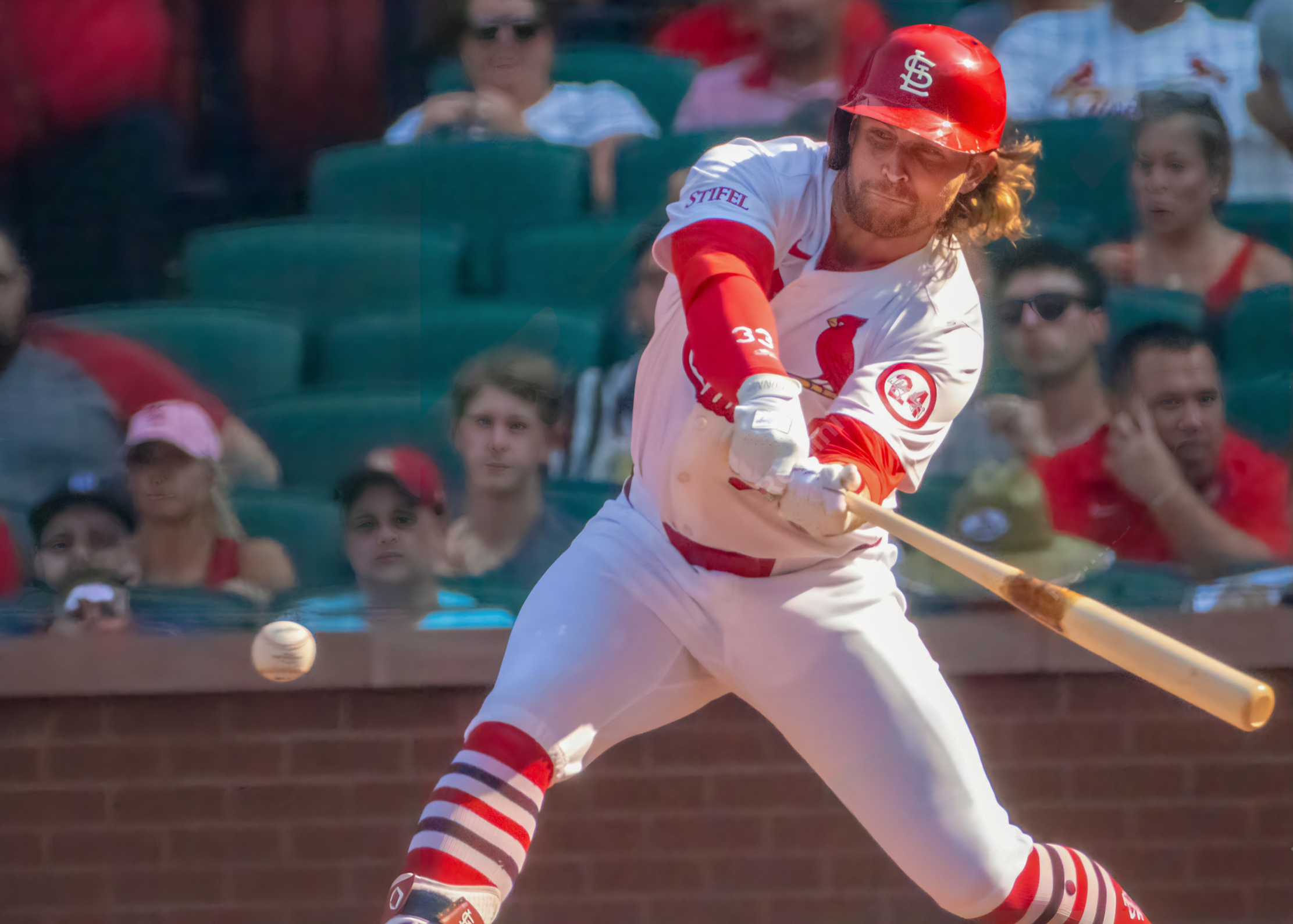
Brendon Donovan swings away in St.Louis.

On April 21, the Cardinals optioned OF speedster and elite CF defender Victor Scott II to AAA-Memphis, along with RH reliever Andre Pallante, 25. Scott needed work to improve his hitting, with his 5-for-59 (.085/.138/.136 and .274 OPS, −22 OPS+) with three Doubles, two Walks, 15 SO, six runs, six RBIs, and two Stolen Bases. They recalled RH reliever Nick Robertson, 25, and C Pedro Pagés. Palante in nine games had a 6.30 ERA. He threw three IP, giving up five hits and three runs (2 earned), walking one, striking out none, in the latest loss 5–12 on April 20, to the Brewers. The Cardinals are 9–12 (.429), losing their last three consecutive games, now five games behind the Brewers, scoring 76 Runs to 93 Runs Against (−17) in their 21 games. The lack of HRs for the Cardinals (13) and the amount of them off St. Louis pitching (26), the sixth-worst in MLB, have been a big reason for the poor start, remaining in last place in the NL Central. Only the White Sox have hit fewer HRs (10) than the Cardinals who have not hit one in seven consecutive games. Miles Mikolas, 35 (1–3, 6.49 ERA, 1.52 WHIP, 5 HRs allowed in 26.1 IP over 5G) took the loss, pulled after 4.2 inn. after having a 4–2 lead after the third inning of the April 20 game against the Brewers, but gave up two runs via a HR in the first, and then three runs via two HRs in the fourth. Mikolas has given up at least five earned runs in a start for the third time in 2024. Batters have hit .311/.353/.538 (.891 O-OPS) against him, each of those (BA/OBP/SLG and O-OPS statistics) are career worsts in his nine-year MLB career.

Sonny Gray (2–1, 1.04 ERA, 0.87 WHIP, .226 O-BA), lost his no-runs-allowed streak, and no-losses season on April 21, after 6.1 innings, giving up two runs in the seventh after one out, for the only scoring of the day for either team. He had 17.1 IP in his three starts before the two runs scored, giving up 14 hits, one walk, and 23 strikeouts. In the game he gave up five hits and a walk, striking out a season-high 12. Back-to-back singles, a stolen base, and a third single accounted for the two runs. LH-reliever JoJo Romero relieved to finish the inning. The 0–2 loss dropped the Cardinals to 9–13 (.409), mired in last place, six games behind the NL Central leading Brewers, who swept the series. This was the team's second game shutout by opponents, getting only six hits, leaving 10 on-base, and just one extra-base hit, a double by Masyn Winn in the second inning. The team was 0-for-9 for runners in scoring position. The Brewers have led all of MLB with the best road winning percentage (9–2, .818) before the win. The Cardinals lost their sixth-consecutive series finale, averaging a small 3.62 runs per game.

After an embarrassing 1–14 blowout loss to Arizona on April 23, with the team 10–14 (.417), Jordan Walker was demoted on April 24, to AAA-Memphis to again work on his swing and pitch-selection issues. He was the DH in the blowout loss game, going 0-for-3. He was hitting only .155 (9-for-58) and .239/.259 .498 OPS, with four doubles, a triple, 0 HRs, and four RBIs in 20 games played of the 24 the team played. He was receptive to the demotion. The issue was Walker's inability to lift balls for homers and his rising whiff rate. In 2023, his ground-ball rate was 46.9%, now 50% in 2024. His line-drive rate decreased from 25.2% to 16.7%. INF Jose Fermin hitting .350 at AAA-Memphis, was recalled. LH-reliever Zach Thompson was also optioned, while LH-reliever John King was recalled for the second time this season.

The Cardinals won the first two games in New York's Citi Field against the Mets, with Miles Mikolas winning the first game on April 26, 4–2, winning only his second game of the year (2–3). Sonny Gray won the next day's game, nationally televised on Fox 7–4, and the series win, atypically giving up three walks when he only gave up one walk and 23 strikeouts in his first three starts, striking out nine to win his third victory (3–1, 1.16 ERA, 32 strikeouts, four walks). He allowed four runs, only one was earned because of an atypical Nolan Arenado error at third base. He gave up four hits in his six innings. JoJo Romero and Andrew Kittredge lead all 30 MLB teams with 10 holds each. Ryan Helsley, pitching in his 15th game, earned his ninth save of the team's 13 wins, tying for the MLB lead.

Because of the rainout postponed game on April 29, the final game in April will be a rare, traditional doubleheader on April 30. Starting time at 2:40pm CT for the first game, with the second game starting 40 min. after the first game ends. Former Cardinals' starter Jack Flaherty (0–1, 4.91 ERA) will pitch the opener against Kyle Gibson (2–2, 4.35 ERA), and Steven Matz (1–2, 5.55 ERA) in game two, with the Tigers' starter unannounced. In the first game, the Cardinals rallied from a 0–1 deficit after eight innings at Detroit (Comerica Park) to win with two runs in the top of the ninth, 2–1, despite former Cardinals' starter Flaherty striking out a career-high of 14 through 6.2 innings, and another former Cardinals' starter (now reliever) Shelby Miller for those two runs in the ninth. Pedro Pages drove in the winning run, his first in MLB, with a long sacrifice fly to deep centerfield just in front of the 412-foot wall, scoring Paul Goldschmidt, after three consecutive singles by Arenado, Goldschmidt, and then Alec Burleson tied the game with one-out before Pages' winning sacrifice fly. Ryan Helsley threw a 1–2–3 ninth to get his 10th save, and reliever Matthew Liberatore picked up his first win (1–1). Kyle Gibson started, pitching seven excellent innings, giving up only one run (a HR) on four hits, walking two, striking out nine. He stays at 2–2, but lowered his ERA to 3.79.

The Cardinals added RH-reliever Kyle Leahy as the 27th man for the second game of the doubleheader after the first game win. LH-reliever Drew Rom was transferred from the 15-day injured list to the 60-day list because of his left shoulder biceps tendinitis. For one of the few games this season, the bullpen blew a five-inning lead, before Detroit scored seven runs (three in the fifth, and four in the seventh), and lost to the Tigers 6–11 in the second game of the doubleheader. Just called up from AAA-Memphis, Kyle Leahy was the loser, 0–1, 13.50 ERA for 2024, but 0–2, 18.00 ERA for his career with his one loss after called up in the 2023 season. He entered in the fourth inning after Matz was pulled, pitched 1.1 inn., giving up two hits, and two runs both earned, walking and striking out none. Steven Matz could only pitch 3.1 innings, giving up seven hits and four runs all earned, walking two, striking out only one. His ERA ballonned to 6.18 from his 5.55 before the game.

The Cardinals for the second consecutive time, could not win to get to the .500 level, ending the Mar/Apr month at 14–16 (.467) scoring 108 runs, but giving up 135 runs for −27 run differential. They are 5–7 at Home, 9–9 on the Road, with a 5–10 (.333) record against teams with a better-than .500 won-loss record. Now trail division-leading Milwaukee (18–11) by four-and-one-half games, presently tied for fourth-place with Pittsburgh, with the Pirates playing a late-game at Oakland. The Redbirds close out their visit to Detroit trying to win the series in the finale on Wednesday, May 1.
The Cardinals averaged 37,244 per game for its 12 home games in MAR/APR; total 446,929.

==== Awards ====
Regular season awards
Performer (position)	Date	Awards	Ref.
Ryan Helsley (Closer)	May 3	NL Reliever of the Month (April) (16 appearances, 10 saves, 1.69 ERA, 9.5 strikeout-to-walk ratio (19 strikeouts, two walks)	

=== Milestones ===
Regular season milestones
Performer	Accomplishment	Date	Ref.
Victor Scott II	First MLB Game	March 28	
Sonny Gray	100th Career Win	April 15	
Pedro Pagés	First RBI	April 30 (1st)	

==== May ====
Steven Matz (1–2, 6.18 ERA) pitched in pain in his April 30 loss to the Detroit Tigers, was placed on the 15-day IL on May 3, backdated to May 1 with a strained lower back. Kyle Leahy was recalled from Triple-A Memphis. Matz underwent an MRI on his back on May 2, an off-day for the team.

May 3 begins a six-game homestand, with the first series against the MLB-worst team, Chicago White Sox (6–25, .194; 89 Runs, 173 Runs Against, −84 diff.), only 5–12 at Home, 1–13 Away; 3–25 against .500+ teams) in the AL Central Division. Both teams have the fewest runs in their respective league (109 StL, 89 Chicago), and the second-lowest batting average, StL .221 (.300/.339 .639 OPS) to Cincinnati .217, and Chicago .212 (.276/.326 .602 OPS) to Oakland .207. The Cardinals have 21 homers, last in baseball, while the White Sox rank one better at 22. Sonny Gray (3–1, 1.16 ERA) opens the series, while the White Sox throw Brad Keller, 28 (0–0, 0.00) who signed a minor-league deal in the off-season. Former Cardinals on the White Sox roster are: pitchers John Brebbia and Dominic Leone, shortstop Paul DeJong and outfielder Tommy Pham.

Sonny Gray (4–1, 0.89 ERA) won his fourth game, 3–0, against the White Sox on May 3, with his seven innings of three-hit, one-walk, six-strikeouts pitching. His 0.89 ERA made him the first Cardinals player with 3-plus wins, 30 or more innings pitched, and a sub-1.00 ERA in his first five starts of the season since Al Jackson in 1966. Gray, Lance Lynn and Kyle Gibson have combined for a 7–3 record and a 2.55 ERA over 99 innings pitched in 2024.

The team lost the final two games and the series to the White Sox, the worst team in MLB (8–26, .235; 100 R, 182 RA, −82) after 5–6 (10 inn.), and 1–5 losses on May 4–5, dropping their last-place record to 15–19, .441; 118 R, 150 RA, −32), 5.5 games behind the division-leading Brewers (20–13, .606). Cardinals, have dropped back-to-back series, and also fell to 1–10 in series finales and 0–6 on Sundays, when RH-reliever Giovanny Gallegos could not record an out in his second straight appearance.

In good news, Dylan Carlson (CF) was activated for Sunday's May 6 game, playing for the first time, missing the first 33 games from his left shoulder sprain on March 25 in Spring Training. Pedro Pagés was optioned to AAA-Memphis. OF/SS Tommy Edman was transferred from the 10-day to the 60-day injured list to make room for RH-reliever Chris Roycroft selected from AAA-Memphis, and RH-reliever Giovanny Gallegos was placed on the 15-day injured list with a right shoulder impingement.

In another unfortunate string of injuries to key players, the currently best hitter on the team, Willson Contreras (.280/.398/.551; .950 OPS/171 OPS+, 6 HR, 12 RBI) was severely injured from a bat swing by J.D. Martinez (Mets) that fractured his left forearm on May 7. Iván Herrera replaced him in the game, and as the regular catcher. An MRI revealed the fracture, and was placed on the IL on May 8. It is estimated he will miss six-to-eight weeks, with him out until he targeted around the time of the July 16 All-Star Game. Pedro Pagés was recalled to be the backup catcher.

Chris Roycroft, 26, (RH-reliever) made his MLB debut in the May 7 game, pitching in the ninth inning, giving up two hits, one run (solo HR), walking none, and striking out two.

Before the game on May 11, Matt Carpenter (DH) was activated after missing 34 games from his right oblique strain. José Fermín was optioned to make room for Carpenter.

The Cardinals seven-game losing streak (May 4–11; 20 R, 45 RA) at 15–24 (.395) and in last place in the NL Central, nine games behind the Brewers, ended on May 12, at Milwaukee, 4–3, highlighted by the slumping Paul Goldschmidt (27-for-142, 3 Doubles, 2 HR, 11 RBIs 16 W, 51 SO; .190/.277/.254, .530 OPS and 55 OPS+) who smashed only his third HR (a solo, fifth inning), his first since April 22 in Arizona to make the score 2–3, and then the game-tying hit in the sixth, his first time getting two hits in a game in May previously. He got one hit in the ninth in the previous game that broke his longest slump of his career, 0-for-32 in their third loss in the four-game set against the Brewers, salvaging the finale on Sunday, now eight games out of the division lead, at 16–24 (.400). Ryan Helsley picked up his 12th save in 13 opportunities with a perfect ninth inning after starter Miles Mikolas (3–5) gave up all three runs he allowed in the first inning. He yielded six hits and three walks in six innings.

On May 13, a season-high eight-runs in one inning (seventh), after trailing 0–4 featured 14 batters, seven hits (four two-strike hits), three walks, and one hit-by-pitch to earn the Cardinals a come-from-behind 10–5 win over the Los Angeles Angels (before gm, 15–26 .366; 170 R, 207 RA; 5–14 Home, 10–12 Road) at Angel Stadium. Cardinals are now 17–24, .415; (146 R, 192 RA; 6–11 Home, 11–13 Road). The two-game win streak was the first consecutive wins since April 26–27 (games 26–27), and the most runs the Cardinals have scored in an inning since May 15, 2023 (10 runs). Nolan Arenado hit a solo HR to start the seventh rally. Paul Goldschmidt was hit by a pitch with the bases loaded, giving the Cardinals the lead (5–4) they would hold for the eventual win. For a second consecutive game, the Cardinals erased a deficit of three runs or more. Coupled with the two-game loss streak by the Milwaukee Brewers (24–17, .585; 209 R, 176 RA; 10–9 Home, 14–8 Away), pushed the Redbirds another game closer to the lead, now seven games behind the Brewers, but still in fifth (last) place in the NL Central, at the one-quarter mark of the season's games played (41 of 162).

The Cardinals win on May 14, their third consecutive, gave them the series win against the Angels, and highlighted by their backup catcher—who started the season as a third catcher, Pedro Pagés' first MLB hit. He was previously optioned on May 5, but recalled to be the backup to Iván Herrera after Willson Contreras' injury on May 7. In a key at-bat with the bases full in the third inning with the team leading 2–0, his double after two outs and two strikes on him, he drove in all three runners for a 5–0 lead, in a tight 7–6 win at Angel Stadium. Sonny Gray (5–2, 3.05 ERA, 1.06 WHIP) started the game with a 2.29 ERA but gave up five runs all earned, eight hits including a three-run HR in the fourth, two walks, and striking out nine in six innings, but got his fifth win after Alec Burleson's two-run HR in the top of the seventh broke a 5–5 tie. The three consecutive wins was only the second time this season (Apr 24, vs. Diamondbacks, 26–27 vs. NY Mets) the struggling Redbirds was able to accomplish as many as three straight wins.

"Harry Caray (top) and Jack Buck clown around in a classic photo taken by the Post-Dispatch's J.B. Forbes photo in 1982, that Chip Caray (top) and Joe Buck have reenacted."—caption on photo

"Holy cow! That's a winner!" The grandson of Cardinals' (1945–1969) broadcaster Harry Caray (25 years), and the son of Cardinals' (1954–1959, 1961–2001) broadcaster Jack Buck (47 years) will unite in the Bally Sports Midwest television broadcast booth on May 24. Chip Caray and Joe Buck will broadcast the game for the one special Friday night. Chip is BSM's lead Cards broadcaster and Buck got his sportscasting start by broadcasting the Birds in 1991, before going on to immense national success. "I think it will be a blast," Buck said. Caray said, "Any time you have a chance to spend time with a guy like Joe it's great, our families are so intertwined in the history of the Cardinals." The Cards are off the day before the Buck-Caray game, then their next two contests are to be shown exclusively by national networks, Fox and then ESPN. BSM general manager Jack Donovan said, adding that Harry and Jack still are regarded two of "the best play-by-play announcers of all time. ... The apple doesn't fall far from the tree." Buck and Caray will be working without a former player in the booth, just as their family predecessors did when they were together — albeit on radio, not TV. And just like in the old days, Caray will be the lead singer. Donovan said the plan is for them to take turns doing play-by-play, but no details have been set. Both announcers say the primary focus will be on the field, not the broadcast booth, although there will be no reporter working that night. "The game comes first," Caray said. "This will not be about Chip or Joe. But I'm sure we'll be talking about his father and my grandfather." Both had humorous responses when asked about being paired now. "He went on to superstardom, I'm just calling local baseball," Caray quipped. "We'll fumble our way through," Buck joked. It has been 55 years since Harry Caray and Jack Buck last formed one of the most legendary local baseball broadcast teams in history, broken up when Caray was fired after the 1969 season following a 15-year partnership across two stints that began in the 1954 season. But it worked out tremendously for both. Caray eventually attained immense regional and national success broadcasting the Chicago Cubs, especially on television in the 1980s, and his departure vaulted Buck to the No. 1 role in the Cardinals' radio booth. Caray (1998) and Buck (2002), who both died more than two decades ago, ended up in the broadcaster's portion of baseball's Hall of Fame. Many fans will certainly will be drawn to modern nostalgia, which sets up as a highlight telecast in what despite a recent uptick so far has been another bleak Cardinals season.

LH-reliever Matthew Liberatore, 24, tried to be an effective (fifth) starter, but in his three starts in 10 innings, he posted a record of 1–2, 8.10 ERA, 1.70 WHIP, with opposing batters hitting .341 against him, after Steven Matz went on the injured list on May 1. This third start was in a series-ending 3–11 loss on Sunday May 19, with the Cardinals (20–26) now 0–6 in potential series-sweeping games this season, entered the day having won five of six games and a chance to sweep a series for the first time this season, which they failed to do. Liberatore threw a season-high 70 pitches and pitched only into the fourth inning (recording no outs in the fourth), allowing four runs, six hits, a home run to ex-Cardinal Tyler O'Neill, one walk, and three strikeouts in three innings. As a reliever, Liberatore has posted a 3.78 ERA, a 1.26 WHIP, and opposing hitters have batted .232 against him, with an OPS of just .650. Manager Oliver Marmol said the Cardinals do need to reassess their options for a fifth starter.

On May 20, RH-reliever Ryan Loutos, 25, was selected to the 40-man roster, and promoted from AAA-Memphis. His first appearance will make him the first Washington University graduate to play in the majors since former Cardinals' general manager and infielder Dal Maxvill last played in 1975, for the Oakland Athletics. In four seasons in the farm system, he has a 5.04 ERA with 200 strikeouts in 175 innings, pitching in 121 games. At AAA-Memphis to begin the 2024 minor league season, he posted a 1.72 ERA and struck out 18 batters in 15 2/3 innings of relief. He entered the team's system as an undrafted free agent in July 2021, and had forgone a software engineering job with Morningstar, Inc., a financial services company. Chris Roycroft was optioned to Class AAA following the Sunday May 19 series end. First baseman/outfielder Alfonso Rivas III was DFA'd to clear a 40-man roster spot

CF Michael Siani's first career HR (as the No. 9 hitter in the lineup), a three-run blast in the fourth inning earned him more RBIs with that single swing than he had previously (2) in his big league career (now 6). That decisive HR in pushing the 2–0 lead to 5–0, gave the fourth-place Cardinals (after win 21–26, .447; six games behind NL Central-leading Milwaukee, 27–20 .574) the cushion to win a 6–3 decision over the visiting Baltimore Orioles that had a (29–15 .659, R 221, RA 163 +58 record; second in the NL East, two games behind the Yankees). It was 80 years after they were the Cardinals' opponents in the "Streetcar World Series", and 70 years after they left St. Louis as the old St. Louis Browns following the Browns' 1953 season, to become the new Orioles. Sonny Gray (6–2, 2.87) won after 5.2 innings with a no-hitter into that inning, and 88 pitches (31 in the sixth), giving up his own three-run HR (1 earned run), after SS Masyn Winn gave up an uncharacteristic two consecutive errors, one going back for a shallow left-center flyball that dropped between him and the two OF'ers, and the other from a grounder off his glove. The subsequent HR cut the lead from 5–0 to 5–3, before the Redbirds added a seventh-inning insurance run by Masyn Winn's infield hit. Ryan Helsley saved his 14th game.

For only the third time all season (49 games), the Cardinals (23–26, .469; R 189 RA 232, −43) enjoyed a three-game winning streak, and their first three-game sweep of one opponent, on May 20–22, against the visiting, high-powered Baltimore Orioles. The Baltimore birds arrived 29–15 (.659), and left at 29–18 (.617), R 229, RS 177 +52, outscored 14–8 by the St. Louis birds team. The second-and-third games were marred by rain delays, that made the middle game (May 21) suspended overnight after a 1:31 rain delay in a 1–1 tie in the sixth inning, until finished in the Wed. May 22 11:15am start time, that ended with a 3–1 win. The third game starting at 12:46pm, lasted 3 hours, 57 min. including a 1:25 rain delay (2:32 game length time), with a satisfying come-from-behind 0–3 deficit win, 5–4 for the first sweep by the Redbirds this season, and the first time the Orioles had their streak of 106 consecutive regular-season series of two or more games without being swept since May 2022, swept away. The highlight was the "Little League" HR by Brendan Donovan in a three-run sixth inning from his double, that drove-in the tying runs, and then advanced to third on the throw from the outfield, then came all the way around to score on their catcher's throwing error trying to nab him at third base. That gave the Cardinals a 4–3 lead, with a critical insurance run the next inning in a previous double that extended his hit streak to 13 games, from Masyn Winn's second HR of the season, a line shot down-the-LF-line, making it 5–3, before the first save in his career by Ryan Fernandez who gave up their fourth run in the ninth. The win pushed the team along with the Brewers' loss (28–21, .571) to only five games behind, and into third-place ahead of the Pirates (23–27 .460), after their late-night loss. After their same-day and next day's (May 23) loss, now only three games behind the second-place Chicago Cubs (27–24 .529; R 218, RA 219, −1) who the team's next series opponent at Busch Stadium, May 24–26. The latter two games (Sat-Sun) to be nationally televised at 6pm CDT on Fox, and ESPN, respectively. The 106 regular-season series streak the Orioles started after their May 15, 2022 (738 days ago) series-sweep losses at Detroit is now the third-longest in history, trailed only by the second-best 115 sweep-less regular-season series of two-plus decisions by the 1906–1909 Chicago Cubs, and the still-record 124 straight regular-season series of two-plus decisions without a sweep by Stan Musial and the St. Louis Swifties-era 1942–1944 St. Louis Cardinals.

The eagerly-awaited broadcast combo of Chip Caray with the return of Joe Buck on May 24 was postponed by an hour-and-a-half due to rain delays. The broadcast was rescheduled for July 13th. However, the rescheduled broadcast was followed by disappointment for fans after Bally Sports Midwest's telecast filled the broadcast with a series of commercials and typical rain-delay canned filler programming—all non-Cardinals related. Buck last did a local Cards telecast in 2007 before turning to his national sportscasting career.

On the team's 50th game on May 25 (24–26, .480), they won a thrilling day game with no rain in the forecast, against their arch-rivals Chicago, 7–6. In a seesaw game that saw the Cardinals take a lead and lose it, and the Cubs take a lead and lose it, only to take it again, the Cardinals trailed by a run entering the bottom of the eighth inning. Alec Burleson scored the seventh and ultimately deciding run from first base, on a triple by Lars Nootbaar, with a deft head-first slide into home and touch with his fingers, that beat the throw, and as the replay on the scoreboard and in the officials in New York City showed after the Chicago challenge, their catcher did not transfer the ball from his barehand to his glove-hand tag, for a 7–4 lead. Chicago scored two in the top of the ninth to make the final score. The attendance of 45,071 was the highest since the April 4 home opening day's 47,273.

On May 26, the club (25–26, .490) swept the abbreviated two-game series against the Cubs (27–26,.509), nationally televised on ESPN, with their third consecutive one-run win (now 8–6 in one-run games), 4–3, with Paul Goldschmidt's first two-HR game in 2024 (5th and 6th; .222/.298/.345 .643 OPS), driving in all four runs, now with 21, with his two-run HRs. Sonny Gray (7–2, 2.60) got his team-leading seventh win throwing five scoreless innings in 74 pitches, giving up only one hit and walking two. He said the stressful fifth inning and the heat got to him and felt less sharp, after striking out his last two batters on his sweeping slider for eight strikeouts. Ryan Helsley earned his MLB-leading 17th Save, for the Cardinals' longest winning streak in 2024, with five, and 10 of their last 12. The game was delayed for 2 hrs, 33 min. by rain, hail, and a tornado warning. In their past 12 games—as they finally leaped out of last place, the Cardinals have also experienced 8 hrs, 12 min. of rain delays, not including the Friday May 24 game postponed by rain, to be played as the second game on July 13. The team crept to within four-and-one-half games behind the division-leading Brewers (30–22, .577).

The team lost its five-game winning streak on May 27 (25–27) to the Cincinnati Reds, 1–3. Lance Lynn (2–3, 3.45) took the loss, pitching six innings, giving up three runs, but only one earned, five hits (one HR).

The Redbirds would rebound the next night in Cincinnati, by winning 7–1. Masyn Winn extended his hitting streak to 17 games, tying Albert Pujols and Jordan Walker. Nolan Arenado connected for a 2-run HR to put the Cardinals up 3–1 in the top of the fourth, and Nolan Gorman hit his own 2-run HR in the top of the seventh, to give St. Louis a 6–1 lead. Kyle Gibson (4–2, 3.60) earned the victory by throwing six innings of one-hit, one run ball, not giving up the first hit until he allowed a leadoff HR in the fifth.

On May 29, The Cardinals and Reds played the rubber game, with Cincinnati sending Frankie Montas (2–4, 4.60) to the mound, and St. Louis sending Andre Pallante (1–1, 3.94) for his first start since July 31, 2022 against the Washington Nationals. The Cardinals (27–27, Home 13–12, Away 14–15; R 213 RA 248 -35), at the one-third (54) games played of the 162-game season, beat the Reds, 5–3, getting to the coveted .500 level for the first time since April 16 (9–9). Masyn Winn extended his hitting streak to 18 games (25-for-68, .368), now second all-time for Cardinals rookies, right behind Joe McEwing's 25-game streak in 1999. The game was Winn's first three-hit day of his career, his seventh multi-hit game during a streak that dates to May 5. The only player in Cardinals' history aged 22 years or younger with a longer hitting streak than Winn has a statue out front of Busch Stadium: The immortal Stan Musial hit in 22 straight games at 22 years old, in 1943. Pallante picked-up his first win of the season with help of a new pitch, a two-seam fastball that consistently ran in on the hands of righties and kept them from leaning out over the plate, and Ryan Helsley earned his 18th Save. The Cardinals won seven out of their last eight (.875), and 12-of-15 (.800). With the Cubs (28–29, .491; R 244 RA 254 -10) losing to the Brewers (33–23, .589; R 282 RA 230 +52) on the Cardinals' (Thu.) May 30 off-day, the Redbirds jumped over them for second place one-half game ahead, and only five games behind the team from Milwaukee. The Cardinals go to Philadelphia, to play the best team in the National League and presently all of MLB, the Phillies (39–18, .684; R 299 RA 206 +93); one-half game better than the NY Yankees (39–19, .672; R 279 RA 182 +97), to close out May.

The May 29 game caused another injury, the second major one to OF Lars Nootbaar this season, this time a left oblique strain from a swing in the seventh inning, that was not revealed until an MRI taken on the May 30 off-day. He was placed on the 10-day IL on May 31, retroactive to May 30. He is estimated to be out for several weeks. He was slugging .520 over the past 14 games. INF Jose Fermin was recalled to take his place on the active roster.

The loss on May 31, also ended the 18-game hitting streak for Masyn Winn that stretched back to May 9 (Game #37) to May 30 (#54). In that span Winn hit .368, .389 on-base percentage, and .559 slugging percentage for a .948 OPS. During the stretch, Winn took over the lead in line drive rate, edging Dodgers' perennial MVP candidate Mookie Betts, at least for now. Winn also continued to play strong defense that has him among the leaders at shortstop for Defensive Runs Saved and a percolating candidate for the National League Rookie of the Year Award. The 18-game streak surpassed the 17-game streak teammate Jordan Walker had in 2023, but short of the 25-game record now-special assistant to John Mozeliak, Joe McEwing set in 1999.

After the club lost its final game for May on the 31st in the first-game of the series to the Phillies, 2–4, its record for May was: 13–12 (.520) scoring 107 runs, but giving up 117 runs for −10 run differential. They were 8–5 at Home, 5–7 on the Road, with a 5–4 (.555) record against teams with a better-than .500 won-loss record. Now in second-place, trail division-leading Milwaukee (34–23, .596) by six games, with Chicago (28–30, .483), in third place, a half-game behind the Cardinals.

SUBTOTALS for 2024 season: 27–28 (.491), scoring 215 runs, giving up 252 for a −37 run differential. DAY 8–16, NIGHT 19–12. Against AL teams, 11–7, NL Teams 16–21. Home 13–12 (.520, RS 102, RA 117), Road 14–16 (.467, RS 113, RA 135). In one-run games, 8–6.
Attendance: 931,867 (5th of 15) in 25 home games, Average: 37,275

=== Milestones ===
Regular season milestones
Performer	Accomplishment	Date	Ref.
Chris Roycroft	MLB debut	May 7	
Pedro Pagés	First Hit	May 14	
Michael Siani	First HR	May 20	
Ryan Fernandez	First Save	May 22	
Masyn Winn	18-game Hit streak (games 37–54)	May 9–30	

==== Awards ====
Regular season awards
Performer (position)	Date	Awards	Ref.
Masyn Winn (SS)	May 6	Statcast's Fastest Recorded Throw by an Infielder; 101.2 miles per hour (162.9 km/h), since 2015	

==== June ====
The team split the final two games, giving the Phillies a series win, with both games nationally televised, Fox, and ESPN, respectively on June 1, and June 2. RH-reliever Ryan Loutos, 25, made his MLB debut on June 1, in the bottom of the eighth inning at Citizens Bank Park, giving up one hit and one walk, no strikeouts, no runs. He earned a computer science degree, and some years earlier worked for the Cardinals by helping write code for the app designed to assist pitchers in their development throughout the organization. He becomes only the fourth Washington University (Bears) graduate to play in the MLB. The others were Muddy Ruel (1915–34), Norm Siebern (1956–68) and Dal Maxvill (1962–75).

On June 7, Dylan Carlson earned his first RBIs of the season, with three to clinch the come-from-behind 8–5 win against the Colorado Rockies, with his two hits. The first came in the sixth inning, a single to tie the game at 5-each, and then doubled in two runs in the eighth to give the team a cushion from the narrow 6–5 lead they would not relinquish, after first squandering a 4–0 lead. He came into the game hitting only 6-for-47 (.128), with 0 RBIs. The team came into that Friday night game tied for last with a .209 batting average with runners in scoring position, but got seven hits and four runs against Colorado's bullpen. Starter Lance Lynn had to leave with that 4–0 lead that disappeared quickly in the fourth inning. Carlson's three RBIs were his first since August 2023 against those same Rockies, with his season ending soon after because of an ankle injury.

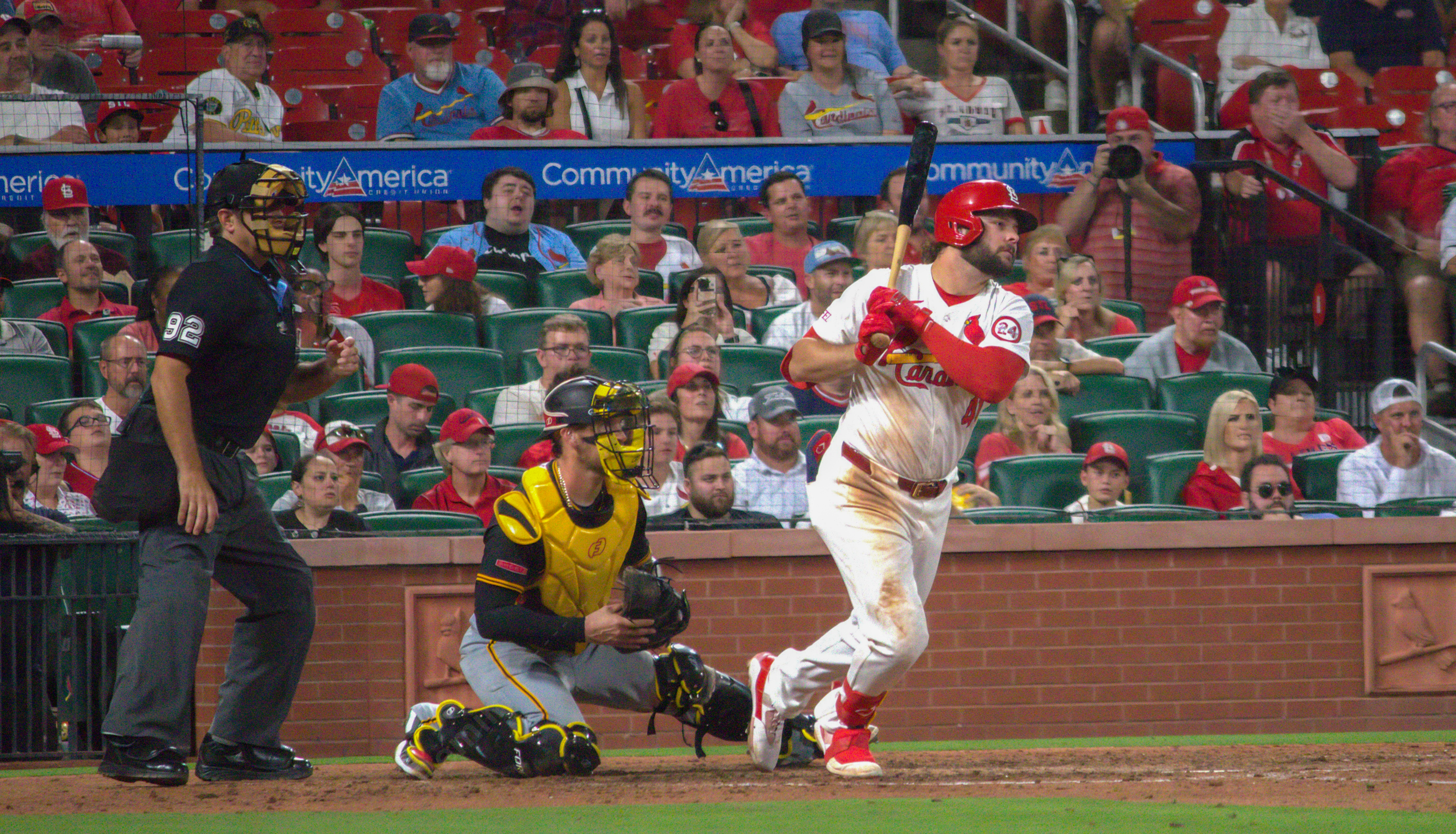
Burleson takes swing against Pittsburgh

Chris Roycroft won his first MLB game pitching in relief, 4–3, on June 13, getting the final two outs in the sixth inning against the Pittsburgh Pirates.

Reserve catcher's Pedro Pagés first MLB Home Run, against arch-rivals Chicago Cubs on a warm June 14 afternoon at Wrigley Field, broke a tight 0–0 pitcher's duel in the eighth inning, for the team's third consecutive win. The solo 363 feet (111 m) homer, wound up in the basket atop the wall in left field, led the Cardinals to a 3–0 shutout, with two more runs after his HR in that inning. The starter Kyle Gibson (5–2, 3.44) gave up only two hits and a walk, striking out six in his seven innings. Ryan Helsley got his 23rd save, giving the Redbirds (34–34) only their fourth time reaching the .500 level (5–5 on April 7, 7–7 on April 12, and 27–27 on May 29), but have not gone over .500 since they were 5–4 on April 6.

Pedro Pagés' second MLB Home Run, a two-run blast to left-center field in the second inning was all the runs scored, and again the difference in the tight 2–1 rubber-game win against the Cubs on June 16, Father's Day, with his family sitting behind Home. Because he's so adept at handling St. Louis' pitching staff, Pagés got his fourth straight start and made his sixth appearance in the past seven games. Ryan Helsley saved his MLB-leading 24th game. The win again put the team at the .500 level (35–35, R 269, RA 307 -38) and into second place, 6.5 games behind in the NL Central, with the Cubs dropping two games behind the Redbirds into fifth (last place, 34–38, .472 R 298, RA 315 -17), 8.5 games behind the division-leading Milwaukee Brewers (42–29, .592 R 344, RA 281 +63).

A wild-and-wacky, full of twists-and-turns June 17 game, a 7–6 (12 inn.) win at LoanDepot Park Miami, last in the NL East (23–48, .324; R 245, RA 361 -116), solidified their hold on second-place, and pushed the team over .500 (36–35 .507) for the first time since April 6 (5–4), beating the Marlins at Busch Stadium. Sonny Gray started the game and pitched the Cardinals to a 4–1 lead after 7.2 inn., charged with two runs, five hits, two walks, and four strikeouts. Only to see reliever Jojo Romero give up a walk for runners on first-and-second base, then a three-run HR to tie the game at 4-each. The teams struggled into extra-innings, with each scoring the automatic second-base runner in the 11th for 5-each, then in the 12th, Masyn Winn knocked in his surprising fourth HR of the season, a two-run blast to give the Birds a 7–5 lead. The Marlins started their half of the 12th with a disputed double from the ball rolling partially under the right-field wall's padding, that scored the automatic runner at second base, for a tight 7–6 lead. RF'er Dylan Carlson threw up his hands, believing the ball was dead, and the hit would be a ground-rule double. After the umpires gathered to decide ruling it was a double, it went to the New York office for review, and on-appeal from Miami manager Skip Schumaker reversed the on-field decision to be a triple. The next batter hit a medium fly into right that Carlson caught then unleashed an on-the-fly rocket throw at 91.5 miles per hour (147.3 km/h), to hit catcher Pedro Pagés to nail the runner 10-feet up the third-base line for a double-play. The next batter grounded out to third, securing the thrilling win, and over .500 after two months below or on it. Reliever Andrew Kittredge pitched the 11th and 12th, to earn his first win of the season. The team has won five of the last six games, also manager Oliver Marmol's 200th win (200–195, .506), while Miami has lost six consecutive and 12 of its last 14.

After dropping the final two games and the series to the Marlins on June 18–19, also dropping the team again below .500 (36–37, .493), the team traveled to Birmingham, Alabama, beating the San Francisco Giants, 6–5, in a nationally televised game on Fox, that again evened the Cardinals' record to .500 at 37–37. What was supposed to be a celebration of Willie Mays and his 22 years (1951–1952, 1954–1973), all but the last year (1973 NY Mets with the NY / San Francisco Giants), with his play in Birmingham starting his baseball career; with his home field at Rickwood as a 17-year-old, in the Negro league in 1948. The celebration and the June 20 game there between the Cardinals and the San Francisco Giants, instead turned into a memorial for him as one of the all-time best in baseball, as he died only two days before the game—on Tuesday, June 18, at the age of 93, at his home in Palo Alto, California from heart failure. The day before on Monday June 17, he released a statement saying he couldn't make it to the game in person, "Birmingham, I wish I could be with you all today. This is where I'm from" but happy that baseball recognized his start there as a member of the Black Barons. Reverend Bill Greason, who played with Willie Mays on the 1948 Black Barons squad that won the Negro American League pennant, threw out the first pitch. Greason, 99 (born September 3, 1924), played (age 23) with Mays on that 1948 team, was the first black player (RH-starting pitcher), on a Cardinals' team in (1954). Greason is the oldest living Negro league player. Greason took on the role as a mentor to the teen-age Mays, and fondly remembered the person he knew well before the rest of the world would come to know him as the "Say Hey Kid." Mays was born in Westfield, Alabama, some miles northeast of Birmingham, but also located in Jefferson County. His shocking death on June 18, saddened all of baseball.

Columnist Ben Frederickson posted a wonderful feeling he had of Stan Musial and Willie Mays seeing the game and talking to each other, "I imagined Musial and Mays watching their beloved teams together instead." They admired and respected each other during their playing careers that overlapped between 1951 through 1963, when the "Pride of N.L," that was the phrase used on the 1963 Topps baseball card that featured both first-ballot Hall of Famers gripping the same bat. He discussed and showed the comparisons of their baseball statistics, and "what is remarkable, though, is just how much they had in common." He concluded with this observation: "Mays and Musial, both universally respected for their grace and class along with their games, are believed to rank first and second all time in number of games played without a single ejection.

In the middle game against the Giants, won by the Redbirds 9–4, on Saturday June 22, to win the series, 3b-man Nolan Arenado was injured on a check swing during his final at-bat in the seventh inning. He received a pain-killing injection to treat nerve irritation in his left forearm on Sunday morning June 23, and was unavailable to play in the finale at home. He is hitting .257/.315/.371, .686 OPS for a 94 OPS+, with only six HRs (5th on the team) and 32 RBIs, 3rd behind Brendan Donovan's team-leading 37, and Nolan Gorman's 36. Paul Goldschmidt is fourth with 31. The team is hopeful that the 10-time Gold Glove Award winner won't have to go on the injured list, with nine already on the list; four on the 60-day list.

In the June 22 game, Paul Goldschmidt hit his 10th HR this season, for his 350th career HR, that tied him for 99th all-time. He trails Dick Allen (351) for 98th all-time. Dick Allen (1b) hit 34 HRs of his 351 HRs in his one season with the Cardinals in 1970, with 101 RBIs leading the team, one more than catcher Joe Torre's 100, hitting 21 HRs.

Sonny Gray (9–4, 2.81) flirted with perfection in his June 23 start in the finale in sweeping the Giants, 5–3, to a team record of 39–37 .513 record, the first time all season the team had a two-game margin over .500, not seen since 2022. He pitched to 20 consecutive no-hit, no-walk batters in 6.2 innings, only seven outs short of a perfect game. He then gave up the first baserunner, a HR, for his only hit given up that made the score 4–1, before his eighth strikeout to end the seventh. He walked none, giving him a 2.81 ERA for a sterling 147 ERA+, 0.948 WHIP, 6.2 hits per 9, and 11.1 strikeouts per 9 inn. for the season. He is 107–89 (.546), 3.44 ERA (122 ERA+) for his career starting in 2013. The relievers gave up two more runs for a narrow 4–3 lead until an insurance run in the eighth inn. gave the final 5–3 win. The Cardinals stole four bases, one by catcher Pedro Pagés, with Ryan Helsley earning his MLB-leading 26th save, for an NL-best record 24–13 (.649) since May 12. Gray's sweeper pitch was statistically the most effective in all of baseball in 2023. The 39–37 team record with a −31 team run differential is good for second place in the NL Central, only five games behind (four on the loss side) the 45–33 (.577) Milwaukee Brewers with a +63 run differential.

The Cardinals activated catcher Willson Contreras from the injured list before the June 24 game, after missing fewer than seven weeks, and only 40 games, since his May 7 injury. Rookie catcher Nick Raposo was optioned to AAA to make room on the roster, and reliever Nick Robertson was activated from the injured list, and also optioned to Memphis. Contreras was batting .280 with six home runs, 12 RBIs in 31 games, 107 ABs, in 128 plate appearances on May 7. He had a .949 OPS and showed improved pitch framing.

LH-Matthew Liberatore, 24, (2–2, 3.86 ERA, 1.15 WHIP) a long-time starter who was converted to a reliever this season, was picked to start his fifth of the season, in the second-game of the split DH on June 26, against the NL East leading Atlanta Braves. After the team lost the first game 2–6, he pitched a gem in his six innings, throwing 85 pitches, gave up only two hits, no runs, walking one, with a career-high eight strikeouts, in a 4–1 win. He has struck out 36 in 44.1 innings in 2024. He was expected to throw only 60–65 pitches, but pitching in the sixth inning, struck out the side. Liberatore's work allowed the team to win for the fifth time in six games, and win the three-game series against the team just ahead of them in the Wild Card standings. The series win came after the club swept the Giants. They've won seven of their past eight at Busch Stadium, and 26–14 (.650) since their low point after the last of their seven-game losing streak on May 11, at 15–24 (.385). The win in the split doubleheader, gave the team a 16–20 (.444) record in Day games, 25–18 (.581) at Night, overall 41–38 (.519), only six games behind the Brewers (five on the loss side), reaching their half-way mark in their season's 81 games (48–33, .593).

In three major roster moves on June 28, the Cardinals announced the recall of RH-reliever Gordon Graceffo, 24 from AAA for depth, and relief from the worn-down pitching staff from a recent road-trip of five consecutive one-run games and two in extra innings. He was a fifth-round draft pick in 2021, a New Jersey native, rated as the #8 prospect in the Cardinals farm system by MLBPipeline.com. His first appearance will be his MLB debut. He was in the starting rotation for Memphis. He has an 8–5 record, 3.84 ERA in 14 starts. He haa s struck out 70, walked 29, a 1.35 WHIP, and .247 opponent's batting average in 75 innings. In the other roster moves, the club optioned RH-reliever Kyle Leahy to AAA, and transferred LH-starter Steven Matz (lower back strain) to the 60-day injured list; Matz has been on the IL since May 1. Manager Oliver Marmol said earlier this week that he planned to use a six-man rotation for the next week's games in order to give his starting pitchers an extra day of rest and recovery between starts. Matthew Liberatore's sterling effort on June 26, and his previous use as a reliever and spot starter, upgraded him to the status of the additional starter.

The Cardinals lost their 1967 "El Birdos" season, MVP winner, Orlando Cepeda ("Cha Cha" or "The Baby Bull"), 86, on Friday, June 28, 10 days after his former Giants' teammate Willie Mays died. He was the fifth player (and manager Red Schoendienst in 2018) since 2020 to pass away from that 1967 World Championship season. He was traded to the Cardinals from the Giants on May 8, 1966 for LH-starter Ray Sadecki, (.303/.362/.469 .831 OPS and 130 OPS+), 17 HR, and 58 RBIs in his 123 games that year. The next year 1967, he won the MVP award unanimously (.325/.399/.524 .923 OPS and 164 OPS+), hitting 25 HR, and NL-leading 111 RBIs. He was an 11-time All-Star and elected to the Baseball Hall of Fame by the Veterans Committee in 1999, becoming only the second player from Puerto Rico (born in Ponce on September 17, 1937) after Roberto Clemente.

June 28, was the team's half-way point in the season, winning in their 81st game (42–39 .519 R 322, RA 359 -37; Home 23–17, Road 19–22; > .500 teams 16–21), 1–0, in a display of pitching and defensive brilliance. Starter and winner Andre Pallante (4–3, 4.50) pitched 5.1 scoreless innings, giving up only four hits, walking three, and striking out five. In six starts since starting in place of the injured Steven Matz, he is 4–2, 3.86 ERA. The lone run came in the third inning, when Michael Siani scored from third base on a short fly-ball sacrifice, beating the Reds shortstop's diving catch running away into centerfield, when his throw was offline to the plate. Brendan Donovan made a superb catch earlier in the game running toward the left-field foul line at the wall, but the highlight of the game was his over-the-wall grab of a deep fly that looked it would tie the game with two-outs in the ninth. The catch gave reliever Ryan Helsley his 29th consecutive Save, extending his team record, but one behind the team's record of 30 before the All-Star Game break by Lee Smith on July 7, 1993.

The last game in June on the 30th, showed Lance Lynn, 37, striking out six Cincinnati Reds batters, including his 1,000th in the second inning as a Cardinal (2011–17, 2024), to join Bob Gibson, Adam Wainwright, Dizzy Dean, Chris Carpenter, and Bob Forsch as only the sixth in the team's 133-year (1892) history in the NL (143 years as a franchise, 1882) to attain 1,000 strikeouts, in his 200th game (178th starting) as a Cardinals pitcher. He started as a reliever in 2011. Lynn (4–3, 3.59) earned the 2–0 win, his 76th (76–50, .603 Win %, 3.40 ERA) as a Cardinal, with his total record 140–98, .588 Win %, 3.73 ERA in his career, giving up only two hits, no runs, walking one, with his six K's in his six innings. Lynn throws three different fastballs (a four-seamer, cutter, and sinker). According to Statcast's run value metric, Lynn's four-seam fastball (+12) has been one of the best pitches in baseball this season, with opponents hitting it at a .202 batting average before today's game. Lynn threw four-seam fastballs for 53 of his 79 pitches; 75 of those 79 were fastballs. Supporting him in earning his 30th Save of 31 Save-opps (a Mar. 30 blown-save, earned the win), closer Ryan Helsley tied former Cardinals reliever Lee Smith's (1993) record of 30 Saves by the All-Star break. The win gave the Redbirds a 16–12 record in June, their first 16-win June since 2015. The attendance was 40,951 pushing the total over 1.5 million after 42 home games, averaging 36,290 per game. If that average remains the same in the remaining 39 home games, the season's total would be 2.93 million.

SUBTOTALS for 2024 season: 43–40 (.518), RUNS 328, RUNS AGAINST 368 -40 run differential. DAY 17–21, NIGHT 26–19. Against AL teams, 12–9, NL Teams 31–31. HOME 24–18 (.571, RS 172, RA 181), ROAD 19–22 (.463, RS 156, RA 187). In one-run games, 15–11 (.577).
Attendance: 1,524,192 (5th of 15) in 42 home games, Average: 36,290

==== Awards ====
Regular season awards
Performer (position)	Date	Awards	Ref.
Paul Goldschmidt (1B)	June 11 / March 5	2023 Lou Gehrig Memorial Award	
Ryan Helsley (Closer)	July 3	NL Reliever of the Month (June) (13 appearances, 12 saves in 12 opps., 2.77 ERA, 6 Hits, 4 ER, 0 HR, 10 W, 21 Strikeouts	

=== Milestones ===
Regular season milestones
Performer	Accomplishment	Date	Ref.
Ryan Loutos	MLB debut	June 1	
Chris Roycroft	First MLB Win	June 13	
Pedro Pagés	First MLB HR	June 14	
Oliver Marmol	200th Manager Win	June 17	
Adam Kloffenstein	MLB Debut	June 20	
Ryan Helsley	25th consecutive Save chance (passing Alex Reyes)	June 20	
Paul Goldschmidt	350th Career HR (99th all-time)	June 22	
Gordon Graceffo	MLB Debut	June 29	
Lance Lynn	1,000th Strikeout as Cardinals pitcher (6th)	June 30	
Ryan Helsley	30th Save before All-Star Game break (tying Lee Smith, 1993)	June 30	

==== July ====
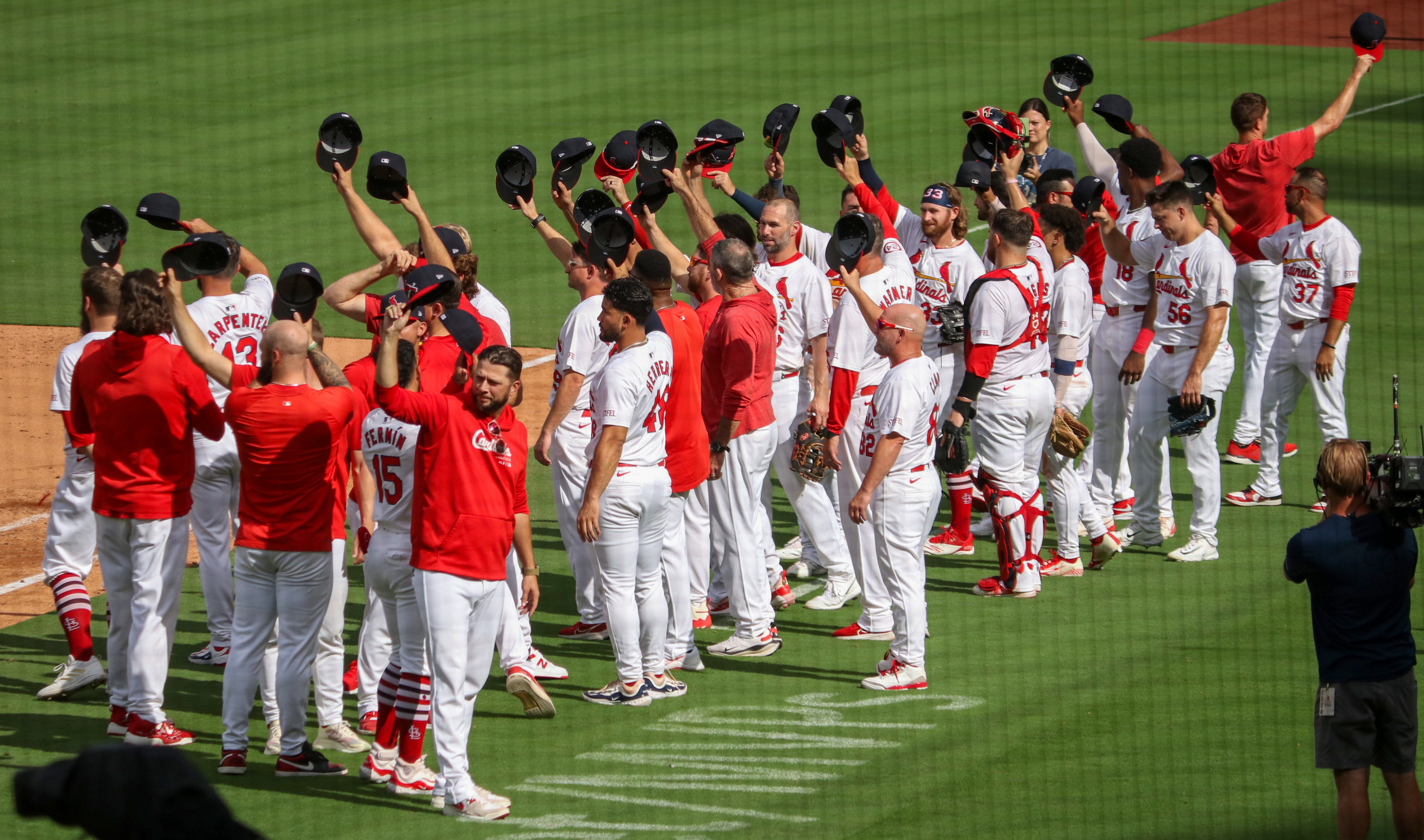
2024 Cardinals salute the fans

The team won a wild come-from-behind win 7–6 in 11 inn. for their third consecutive extra-inning game, on Friday, July 5, against the Washington Nationals at Nationals Park. They won the previous day's July 4 contest, 3–2 in 10 inn. in Pittsburgh, but lost the prior July 3 game 4–5, in 10 inn. against Pittsburgh. The Friday win gave them a 46–41 season-high five games over .500 record in staying in second place behind Milwaukee. That 7–6 win was a 5–6 loser going into the 9th inning, when Willson Contreras hit a solo HR to tie the game after the team fought back from a 0–5 deficit. Both teams scored a run in the 10th inn., for a 6–6 game, but Masyn Winn scored on a passed ball in the 11th inning for the winning run, with closer Ryan Helsley received the win (3–3) after his first blown Save in the 10th his first multi-innings in relief appearance, breaking his streak of 31 consecutive Saves.

RH-Ryan Helsley, 29, was named to his second All-Star Game, (first time in 2022) on July 7, setting a career high with 31 Saves, reaching All-Star status for the first time, while also becoming a father. Now the game's most dominant closer, Helsley is the Cardinals' longest-tenured player and the Cardinals' lone All-Star representative, despite the team winning at a 32–18 (.640) pace since Mother's Day on Sun. May 12 (16–24, .400). Middle relievers JoJo Romero and Andrew Kittredge, rank first and third in MLB in Holds with 26 and 24, respectively, did not get All-Star nods.

LF-Lars Nootbaar was activated from the injured list before the July 8 game in Washington, after missing 35 games (May 31 – Jul 7; gms 55–89) from a left oblique strain. Infielder Jose Fermin was optioned to AAA-Memphis to make room.

The Cardinals signed their top Draft pick on July 23, #7-pick, the 24th overall prospect in baseball (Baseball America), SS, J. J. Wetherholt, 21, 5' 10", 190-pounds from West Virginia University, a Pittsburgh-area native (attended Mars Area High School), in Mars, PA. He is a natural RH-hitter, but LH since age six. He is the Cardinals highest overall selection since outfielder J.D. Drew was taken 5th overall in 1998. In three seasons for the West Virginia Mountaineers he hit .370/.468/.625; 1.093 OPS with 29 home runs, 49 doubles, 129 RBI, 148 runs and a 1:1 strikeout-to-walk ratio with 82 walks in 145 career games. He was limited to 36 games in 2024, after injuring his hamstring in February. Born on September 10, 2002, in Baltimore as John David Wetherholt. The reported bonus was for $6.9 million, slightly over-slot $6.823 mil. deal, considered by some scouts the best pure hitter in this year's Draft class .

=== Awards ===
Regular season awards
Performer (position)	Date	Awards	Ref.
Ryan Helsley (Closer)	July 7	All-Star Game (elected not to pitch) (31 Saves leads all of MLB)	

=== Milestones ===
Regular season milestones
Performer	Accomplishment	Date	Ref.
Ryan Helsley	31st Save (before July 16 All-Star Game, in 84th team game, breaking Lee Smith's 1993 record); 32nd Save (95th team game)	July 2 July 13	(Ended; Jul 5)
Kyle Leahy	1st MLB Save	July 20 (2nd game)	
Lance Lynn	2,000th MLB Strikeout (1,013 with Cardinals)	July 23	
Ryan Fernandez	1st MLB Win	July 23	
Nolan Arenado	100th HR as a Cardinal (335th in MLB)	July 23	
Paul Goldschmidt	2,000th MLB Hit and 355th HR (818th Hit, 146th HR for Cardinals (781 G, 2019)	July 26	

== Game log ==
Legend
Cardinals Win	Cardinals Loss	Game postponed	Eliminated from playoff race
Boldface text denotes a Cardinals pitcher

2024 St. Louis Cardinals Game Log: 83–79 (Home: 44–37; Away: 39–42)
March/April: 14–16 (Home: 5–7; Away: 9–9)

#	Date	Opponent	Score	Win	Loss	Save	Attendance	Record	Box / Streak
1	March 28	@ Dodgers	1–7	Glasnow (1–0)	**Mikolas** (0–1)	Yarbrough (1)	52,667	0–1	L1
2	March 29	@ Dodgers	3–6	Miller (1–0)	**Thompson** (0–1)	Phillips (2)	47,524	0–2	L2
3	March 30	@ Dodgers	6–5 (10)	**Helsley** (1–0)	Hurt (0–1)	**Gallegos** (1)	45,019	1–2	W1
4	March 31	@ Dodgers	4–5	Crismatt (1–0)	**King** (0–1)	Hudson (1)	41,014	1–3	L1
5	April 1	@ Padres	6–2	**Gibson** (1–0)	Waldron (0–1)	—	37,566	2–3	W1
6	April 2	@ Padres	5–2	**Mikolas** (1–1)	Darvish (0–1)	**Helsley** (1)	43,076	3–3	W2
7	April 3	@ Padres	2–3	Musgrove (1–1)	**Thompson** (0–2)	Suárez (3)	38,835	3–4	L1
8	April 4	Marlins	8–5	**Gallegos** (1–0)	Sánchez (0–1)	**Helsley** (2)	47,273	4–4	W1
9	April 6	Marlins	3–1	**Matz** (1–0)	Rogers (0–1)	**Helsley** (3)	37,328	5–4	W2
10	April 7	Marlins	3–10	Meyer (1–0)	**Gibson** (1–1)	—	39,519	5–5	L1
11	April 8	Phillies	3–5 (10)	Hoffman (1–0)	**Helsley** (1–1)	Soto (1)	32,621	5–6	L2
12	April 9	Phillies	3–0	**Gray** (1–0)	Wheeler (0–2)	**Helsley** (4)	31,972	6–6	W1
13	April 10	Phillies	3–4	Nola (2–1)	**Pallante** (0–1)	Hoffman (1)	33,104	6–7	L1
14	April 12	@ Diamondbacks	9–6	**Gallegos** (2–0)	Mantiply (1–1)	**Helsley** (5)	29,247	7–7	W1
15	April 13	@ Diamondbacks	2–4	Nelson (1–2)	**Gibson** (1–2)	Ginkel (3)	33,640	7–8	L1
16	April 14	@ Diamondbacks	0–5	Gallen (3–0)	**Mikolas** (1–2)	—	26,460	7–9	L2
17	April 15	@ Athletics	3–1	**Gray** (2–0)	Stripling (0–4)	**Helsley** (6)	5,508	8–9	W1
18	April 16	@ Athletics	3–2	**Lynn** (1–0)	Jiménez (1–1)	**Helsley** (7)	3,296	9–9	W2
19	April 17	@ Athletics	3–6	Blackburn (2–0)	**Matz** (1–1)	Miller (4)	9,551	9–10	L1
20	April 19	Brewers	1–2 (10)	Payamps (1–1)	**Helsley** (1–2)	Milner (1)	40,147	9–11	L2
21	April 20	Brewers	5–12	Wilson (2–0)	**Mikolas** (1–3)	—	41,949	9–12	L3
22	April 21	Brewers	0–2	Hudson (1–0)	**Gray** (2–1)	Payamps (3)	40,715	9–13	L4
23	April 22	Diamondbacks	5–3	**Helsley** (2–2)	Thompson (0–1)	—	33,036	10–13	W1
24	April 23	Diamondbacks	1–14	Henry (1–1)	**Matz** (1–2)	Allen (1)	32,875	10–14	L1
25	April 24	Diamondbacks	5–1	**Gibson** (2–2)	Montgomery (1–1)	—	36,390	11–14	W1
26	April 26	@ Mets	4–2	**Mikolas** (2–3)	Buttó (0–1)	**Helsley** (8)	24,159	12–14	W2
27	April 27	@ Mets	7–4	**Gray** (3–1)	Houser (0–3)	**Helsley** (9)	32,332	13–14	W3
28	April 28	@ Mets	2–4 (11)	Garrett (5–0)	**Liberatore** (0–1)	—	30,980	13–15	L1
–	April 29	@ Tigers	Postponed (inclement weather). Rescheduled to April 30.						Ppd.
29	April 30 (1)	@ Tigers	2–1	**Liberatore** (1–1)	Miller (3–3)	**Helsley** (10)	see 2nd game	14–15	W1
30	April 30 (2)	@ Tigers	6–11	Holton (2–0)	**Leahy** (0–1)	—	16,290	14–16	L1

May: 13–12 (Home: 8–5; Away: 5–7)

#	Date	Opponent	Score	Win	Loss	Save	Attendance	Record	Box / Streak
31	May 1	@ Tigers	1–4	Maeda (1–1)	**Mikolas** (2–4)	Lange (2)	16,035	14–17	L2
32	May 3	White Sox	3–0	**Gray** (4–1)	Keller (0–1)	**Helsley** (11)	34,010	15–17	W1
33	May 4	White Sox	5–6 (10)	Kopech (1–3)	**Fernandez** (0–1)	Banks (1)	38,559	15–18	L1
34	May 5	White Sox	1–5	Crochet (2–4)	**Gallegos** (2–1)	—	43,046	15–19	L2
35	May 6	Mets	3–4	Manaea (2–1)	**Kittredge** (0–1)	Díaz (5)	31,283	15–20	L3
36	May 7	Mets	5–7	Buttó (1–2)	**Mikolas** (2–5)	Ottavino (1)	32,606	15–21	L4
–	May 8	Mets	Postponed (inclement weather). Rescheduled to August 5.						Ppd."
37	May 9	@ Brewers	1–7	Koenig (4–1)	**Gray** (4–2)	—	25,031	15–22	L5
38	May 10	@ Brewers	2–11	Gasser (1–0)	**Lynn** (1–1)	Herget (1)	30,104	15–23	L6
39	May 11	@ Brewers	3–5	Milner (1–0)	**Kittredge** (0–2)	Megill (4)	34,028	15–24	L7
40	May 12	@ Brewers	4–3	**Mikolas** (3–5)	Peguero (4–1)	**Helsley** (12)	36,895	16–24	W1
41	May 13	@ Angels	10–5	**Leahy** (1–1)	Moore (0–1)	—	22,814	17–24	W2
42	May 14	@ Angels	7–6	**Gray** (5–2)	Strickland (1–1)	**Helsley** (13)	21,490	18–24	W3
43	May 15	@ Angels	2–7	Canning (2–4)	**Lynn** (1–2)	—	21,961	18–25	L1
44	May 17	Red Sox	10–6	**Gibson** (3–2)	Bello (4–2)	—	37,961	19–25	W1
45	May 18	Red Sox	7–2	**Romero** (1–0)	Slaten (2–2)	—	40,690	20–25	W2
46	May 19	Red Sox	3–11	Pivetta (2–2)	**Liberatore** (1–2)	—	39,316	20–26	L1
47	May 20	Orioles	6–3	**Gray** (6–2)	Kremer (3–4)	**Helsley** (14)	35,598	21–26	W1
48	May 21	Orioles	3–1	**Lynn** (2–2)	Webb (0–3)	**Helsley** (15)	32,582	22–26	W2
49	May 22	Orioles	5–4	**King** (1–1)	Irvin (4–2)	**Fernandez** (1)	33,324	23–26	W3
–	May 24	Cubs	Postponed (inclement weather). Rescheduled to 2nd game July 13.						Ppd."
50	May 25	Cubs	7–6	**Romero** (2–0)	Leiter Jr. (1–2)	**Helsley** (16)	45,071	24–26	W4
51	May 26	Cubs	4–3	**Gray** (7–2)	Assad (4–1)	**Helsley** (17)	40,892	25–26	W5
52	May 27	@ Reds	1–3	Lodolo (4–2)	**Lynn** (2–3)	Sims (1)	24,797	25–27	L1
53	May 28	@ Reds	7–1	**Gibson** (4–2)	Abbott (3–5)	—	19,471	26–27	W1
54	May 29	@ Reds	5–3	**Pallante** (1–1)	Montas (2–4)	**Helsley** (18)	18,713	27–27	W2
55	May 31	@ Phillies	2–4	Nola (7–2)	**Mikolas** (3–6)	Hoffman (5)	44,742	27–28	L1

June: 16–12 (Home: 11–6; Away: 5–6)

#	Date	Opponent	Score	Win	Loss	Save	Attendance	Record	Box / Streak
56	June 1	@ Phillies	1–6	Turnbull (3–0)	**Gray** (7–3)	—	44,668	27–29	L2
57	June 2	@ Phillies	5–4 (10)	**King** (2–1)	Soto (1–3)	**Helsley** (19)	41,190	28–29	W1
58	June 3	@ Astros	4–7	Montero (1–1)	**Romero** (2–1)	Hader (9)	33,638	28–30	L1
59	June 4	@ Astros	5–8	Scott (2–2)	**Pallante** (1–2)	Pressly (1)	33,468	28–31	L2
60	June 5	@ Astros	4–2	**Mikolas** (4–6)	Blanco (5–2)	**Helsley** (20)	32,047	29–31	W1
61	June 6	Rockies	2–3	Quantrill (5–4)	**Gray** (7–4)	Kinley (3)	33,332	29–32	L1
62	June 7	Rockies	8–5	**Romero** (3–1)	Carasiti (0–1)	**Helsley** (21)	35,229	30–32	W1
63	June 8	Rockies	5–6	Vodnik (1–0)	**Kittredge** (0–3)	Kinley (4)	34,577	30–33	L1
64	June 9	Rockies	5–1	**Pallante** (2–2)	Blach (2–4)	—	40,219	31–33	W1
65	June 11	Pirates	1–2	Holderman (2–0)	**Helsley** (2–3)	Bednar (14)	34,278	31–34	L1
66	June 12	Pirates	4–2	**Gray** (8–4)	Falter (3–4)	**Helsley** (22)	36,608	32–34	W1
67	June 13	Pirates	4–3	**Roycroft** (1–0)	Keller (8–4)	**Kittredge** (1)	33,398	33–34	W2
68	June 14	@ Cubs	3–0	**Gibson** (5–2)	Wesneski (2–4)	**Helsley** (23)	40,160	34–34	W3
69	June 15	@ Cubs	1–5	Imanaga (7–1)	**Pallante** (2–3)	—	40,088	34–35	L1
70	June 16	@ Cubs	2–1	**Mikolas** (5–6)	Taillon (3–3)	**Helsley** (24)	39,118	35–35	W1
71	June 17	@ Marlins	7–6 (12)	**Kittredge** (1–3)	Puk (0–8)	—	9,460	36–35	W2
72	June 18	@ Marlins	8–9 (10)	Faucher (2–1)	**Roycroft** (1–1)	—	8,850	36–36	L1
73	June 19	@ Marlins	3–4	Scott (6–5)	**Fernandez** (0–2)	—	11,830	36–37	L2
74	June 20*	Giants	6–5	**Pallante** (3–3)	Winn (3–8)	**Helsley** (25)	8,332	37–37	W1
75	June 22	Giants	9–4	**Mikolas** (6–6)	Hicks (4–4)	—	41,815	38–37	W2
76	June 23	Giants	5–3	**Gray** (9–4)	Webb (6–6)	**Helsley** (26)	37,492	39–37	W3
77	June 24	Braves	4–3	**Lynn** (3–3)	Schwellenbach (1–3)	**Helsley** (27)	36,005	40–37	W4
–	June 25	Braves	Postponed (inclement weather). Rescheduled to June 26 1st game of split DH.						Ppd.
78	June 26 (1)	Braves	2–6	López (6–2)	**Gibson** (5–3)	—	33,997	40–38	L1
79	June 26 (2)	Braves	4–1	**Liberatore** (2–2)	Elder (1–3)	**Helsley** (28)	33,921	41–38	W1
80	June 27	Reds	4–11	Abbott (7–6)	**Mikolas** (6–7)	—	32,787	41–39	L1
81	June 28	Reds	1–0	**Pallante** (4–3)	Montas (3–6)	**Helsley** (29)	40,220	42–39	W1
82	June 29	Reds	4–9	Spiers (2–1)	**Gray** (9–5)	—	39,164	42–40	L1
83	June 30	Reds	2–0	**Lynn** (4–3)	Greene (5–4)	**Helsley** (30)	40,951	43–40	W1
*June 20 game played at Rickwood Field in Birmingham, Alabama

July: 13–12 (Home: 5–7; Away: 8–5)

#	Date	Opponent	Score	Win	Loss	Save	Attendance	Record	Box / Streak
84	July 2	@ Pirates	7–4	**Gibson** (6–3)	Keller (9–5)	**Helsley** (31)	17,701	44–40	W2
85	July 3	@ Pirates	4–5 (10)	Chapman (1–3)	**Kittredge** (1–4)	—	20,237	44–41	L1
86	July 4	@ Pirates	3–2 (10)	**King** (3–1)	Santana (2–1)	—	20,990	45–41	W1
87	July 5	@ Nationals	7–6 (11)	**Helsley** (3–3)	Floro (3–2)	—	24,072	46–41	W2
88	July 6	@ Nationals	6–14	Barnes (5–2)	**Lynn** (4–4)	—	21,838	46–42	L1
89	July 7	@ Nationals	8–3	**Gibson** (7–3)	Herz (1–3)	—	19,782	47–42	W1
90	July 8	@ Nationals	6–0	**Mikolas** (7–7)	Parker (5–5)	—	16,454	48–42	W2
–	July 9	Royals	Postponed (inclement weather). Rescheduled to July 10 1st game of split DH.						Ppd.
91	July 10 (1)	Royals	4–6	Marsh (7–6)	**Pallante** (4–4)	McArthur (16)	32,108	48–43	L1
92	July 10 (2)	Royals	5–8	Wacha (6–6)	**Graceffo** (0–1)	McArthur (17)	37,898	48–44	L2
93	July 12	Cubs	1–5	Hendricks (2–7)	**Gray** (9–6)	Neris (13)	40,667	48–45	L3
94	July 13 (1)	Cubs	11–3	**Lynn** (5–4)	Wesneski (3–6)	—	39,129	49–45	W1
95	July 13 (2)	Cubs	5–4	**Romero** (4–1)	Hodge (0–1)	**Helsley** (32)	43,827	50–45	W2
96	July 14	Cubs	3–8	Taillon (7–4)	**Mikolas** (7–8)	—	39,314	50–46	L1
July 16 **94th All-Star Game in Arlington, Texas**
–	July 19	@ Braves	Postponed (inclement weather). Rescheduled to July 20 1st game of split DH.						Ppd.
97	July 20 (1)	@ Braves	2–3 (10)	Johnson (3–1)	**Roycroft** (1–2)	—	37,042	50–47	L2
98	July 20 (2)	@ Braves	9–5	**Gray** (10–6)	Elder (1–4)	**Leahy** (1)	42,168	51–47	W1
99	July 21	@ Braves	6–2	**Mikolas** (8–8)	Schellenbach (3–5)	—	36,348	52–47	W2
100	July 22	@ Pirates	1–2	Chapman (2–4)	**King** (3–2)	Bednar (18)	18,970	52–48	L1
101	July 23	@ Pirates	2–1	**Fernandez** (1–2)	Skenes (6–1)	**Helsley** (33)	32,422	53–48	W1
102	July 24	@ Pirates	0–5	Pérez (2–5)	**Liberatore** (2–3)	—	20,091	53–49	L1
103	July 26	Nationals	8–10 (10)	Barnes (6–2)	**Fernandez** (1–3)	—	41,382	53–50	L2
104	July 27	Nationals	3–14	Irvin (8–8)	**Gibson** (7–4)	—	39,372	53–51	L3
105	July 28	Nationals	4–3	**Helsley** (4–3)	Floro (3–3)	—	37,639	54–51	W1
106	July 29	Rangers	3–6	Eovaldi (8–4)	**Pallante** (4–5)	Yates (19)	34,281	54–52	L1
107	July 30	Rangers	8–1	**Lynn** (6–4)	Scherzer (2–4)	—	32,395	55–52	W1
108	July 31	Rangers	10–1	**McGreevy** (1–0)	Heaney (4–11)	—	31,365	56–52	W2

August: 12–16 (Home: 7–7; Away: 5–9)

#	Date	Opponent	Score	Win	Loss	Save	Attendance	Record	Box / Streak
109	August 1	@ Cubs	4–5	Pearson (1–1)	**Helsley** (4–4)	—	37,969	56–53	L1
110	August 2	@ Cubs	3–6	Miller (3–1)	**Fedde** (7–5)	Neris (15)	37,613	56–54	L2
111	August 3	@ Cubs	5–4	**Romero** (5–1)	Neris (8–4)	**Helsley** (34)	40,073	57–54	W1
112	August 4	@ Cubs	2–6	Steele (3–5)	**Mikolas** (8–9)	—	34,593	57–55	L1
113	August 5	Mets	0–6	Manaea (8–4)	**Pallante** (4–6)	—	34,881	57–56	L2
114	August 6	Rays	4–3	**Gray** (11–6)	Springs (0–1)	**Helsley** (35)	32,922	58–56	W1
115	August 7	Rays	5–2	**Fedde** (8–5)	Bradley (6–6)	**Helsley** (36)	31,401	59–56	W2
116	August 8	Rays	4–6	Lovelady (3–4)	**Romero** (5–2)	Fairbanks (22)	35,217	59–57	L1
117	August 9	@ Royals	8–5	**Liberatore** (3–3)	Smith (0–4)	**Helsley** (37)	34,066	60–57	W1
118	August 10	@ Royals	3–8	Wacha (9–6)	**Fernandez** (1–4)	Erceg (4)	36,799	60–58	L1
119	August 12	@ Reds	1–6	Abbott (10–9)	**Gray** (11–7)	—	21,682	60–59	L2
120	August 13	@ Reds	1–4	Greene (9–4)	**Fedde** (8–6)	Díaz (24)	19,107	60–60	L3
121	August 14	@ Reds	2–9	Moll (3–1)	**Gibson** (7–5)	—	15,967	60–61	L4
122	August 16	Dodgers	6–7	Wrobleski (1–1)	**Mikolas** (8–10)	Kopech (10)	38,485	60–62	L5
123	August 17	Dodgers	5–2	**Pallante** (5–6)	Miller (1–3)	**Helsley** (38)	41,929	61–62	W1
124	August 18	Dodgers	1–2	Kershaw (2–2)	**Gray** (11–8)	Kopech (11)	40,246	61–63	L1
125	August 20	Brewers	2–3	Montas (6–8)	**Fedde** (8–7)	Williams (5)	30,022	61–64	L2
126	August 21	Brewers	10–6 (10)	**Helsley** (5–4)	Megill (0–3)	—	29,580	62–64	W1
127	August 22	Brewers	3–0	**Kittredge** (2–4)	Mears (1–5)	**Helsley** (39)	28,730	63–64	W2
128	August 23	@ Twins	6–1	**Pallante** (6–6)	Festa (2–3)	—	29,634	64–64	W3
129	August 24	@ Twins	0–6	López (12–8)	**Gray** (11–9)	—	35,183	64–65	L1
130	August 25	@ Twins	3–2	**Armstrong** (3–2)	Durán (6–7)	**Helsley** (40)	28,018	65–65	W1
131	August 26	Padres	4–7	Vásquez (4–6)	**Gibson** (7–6)	—	28,697	65–66	L1
132	August 27	Padres	5–7	Matsui (4–2)	**King** (3–3)	Scott (20)	27,224	65–67	L2
133	August 28	Padres	4–3	**Helsley** (6–4)	Suárez (8–1)	—	30,999	66–67	W1
134	August 29	Padres	4–1	**Gray** (12–9)	King (11–8)	**Helsley** (41)	26,553	67–67	W2
135	August 30	@ Yankees	3–6	Stroman (10–6)	**Fedde** (8–8)	Holmes (29)	47,103	67–68	L1
136	August 31	@ Yankees	6–5	**Gibson** (8–6)	Warren (0–3)	**Helsley** (42)	41,454	68–68	W1

September: 15–11 (Home: 8–5; Away: 7–6)

#	Date	Opponent	Score	Win	Loss	Save	Attendance	Record	Box / Streak
137	September 1	@ Yankees	14–7	**Romero** (6–2)	Cousins (1–1)	—	42,768	69–68	W2
138	September 2	@ Brewers	3–9	Peralta (10–7)	**Pallante** (6–7)	—	41,731	69–69	L1
139	September 3	@ Brewers	7–4 (12)	**Helsley** (7–4)	Peguero (7–4)	—	20,027	70–69	W1
140	September 4	@ Brewers	3–2 (10)	**Kittredge** (3–4)	Payamps (3–7)	**Fernandez** (2)	20,027	71–69	W2
141	September 6	Mariners	1–6	Miller (11–8)	**Fedde** (8–9)	—	37,476	71–70	L1
142	September 7	Mariners	2–0	**Kittredge** (4–4)	Gilbert (7–11)	**Helsley** (43)	38,532	72–70	W1
143	September 8	Mariners	4–10	Thornton (4–3)	**Mikolas** (8–11)	—	41,302	72–71	L1
144	September 10	Reds	0–3	Lowder (1–1)	**Pallante** (6–8)	Pagán (1)	30,350	72–72	L2
145	September 11	Reds	2–1	**Romero** (7–2)	Farmer (3–1)	**Helsley** (44)	30,179	73–72	W1
146	September 12	Reds	6–1	**Gray** (13–9)	Spiers (5–6)	**Romero** (1)	32,528	74–72	W2
147	September 13	@ Blue Jays	3–4 (11)	Swanson (2–2)	**Fernandez** (1–5)	—	30,380	74–73	L1
148	September 14	@ Blue Jays	2–7	Berríos (16–9)	**Gibson** (8–7)	—	33,999	74–74	L2
149	September 15	@ Blue Jays	2–3	Pop (2–4)	**Kittredge** (4–5)	Green (17)	34,793	74–75	L3
150	September 16	Pirates	4–0	**Pallante** (7–8)	Skenes (10–3)	—	30,138	75–75	W1
151	September 17	Pirates	3–1	**Lynn** (7–4)	Falter (8–8)	**Helsley** (45)	30,562	76–75	W2
152	September 18	Pirates	10–5	**McGreevy** (2–0)	Bednar (3–8)	—	30,061	77–75	W3
153	September 19	Pirates	2–3	Mlodzinski (4–5)	**Romero** (7–3)	Chapman (10)	32,194	77–76	L1
154	September 20	Guardians	1–5	Lively (13–9)	**Gibson** (8–8)	Sabrowski (1)	33,967	77–77	L2
155	September 21	Guardians	6–5	**Mikolas** (9–11)	Boyd (2–2)	**Helsley** (46)	41,317	78–77	W1
156	September 22	Guardians	2–1	**Pallante** (8–8)	Herrin (5–1)	**Helsley** (47)	39,100	79–77	W2
157	September 24	@ Rockies	7–3	**Kittredge** (5–5)	Chivilli (1–3)	—	25,924	80–77	W3
158	September 25	@ Rockies	5–2	**Fedde** (9–9)	Gomber (5–12)	**Helsley** (48)	26,863	81–77	W4
159	September 26	@ Rockies	8–10	Chivilli (2–3)	**Fernandez** (1–6)	Halvorsen (2)	25,344	81–78	L1
160	September 27	@ Giants	6–3	**Mikolas** (10–11)	Roupp (1–2)	**Helsley** (49)	35,101	82–78	W1
161	September 28	@ Giants	5–6	Walker (10–4)	**Liberatore** (3–4)	Bivens (1)	36,328	82–79	L1
162	September 29	@ Giants	6–1	**McGreevy** (3–0)	Birdsong (5–6)	—	32,348	83–79	W1

== Roster ==
2024 St. Louis Cardinals
Roster
Pitchers: 30 Shawn Armstrong; 12 Erick Fedde; 64 Ryan Fernandez; 65 Giovanny Gallegos; 44 Kyle Gibson; 67 Gordon Graceffo; 54 Sonny Gray; 56 Ryan Helsley; 47 John King; 27 Andrew Kittredge; 66 Adam Kloffenstein; 62 Kyle Leahy; 52 Matthew Liberatore; 68 Ryan Loutos; 31 Lance Lynn; 32 Steven Matz; 36 Michael McGreevy; 39 Miles Mikolas; 55 Riley O'Brien; 53 Andre Pallante; 29 Nick Robertson; 59 JoJo Romero; 58 Chris Roycroft; 57 Zack Thompson	Catchers: 40 Willson Contreras; 48 Iván Herrera; 43 Pedro Pagés; Infielders: 28 Nolan Arenado; 26 Luken Baker; 13 Matt Carpenter; 35 Brandon Crawford; 15 José Fermín; 46 Paul Goldschmidt; 16 Nolan Gorman; 25 Thomas Saggese; 0 Masyn Winn	Outfielders: 41 Alec Burleson; 3 Dylan Carlson; 33 Brendan Donovan; 21 Lars Nootbaar; 29 Tommy Pham; 11 Victor Scott II; 63 Michael Siani; 18 Jordan Walker	Manager: 37 Oliver Marmol; Coaches: 87 Brandon Allen (assistant hitting); 90 Dusty Blake (pitching); 82 Stubby Clapp (first base); 34 Daniel Descalso (bench); 88 Packy Elkins (game planning); 89 Dean Kiekhefer (assistant pitching); 51 Willie McGee (assistant coach); 94 Jamie Pogue (assistant coach/bullpen); 74 Julio Rangel (assistant pitching/bullpen); 76 Kleininger Teran (bullpen catcher); 49 Turner Ward (hitting); 75 Ron 'Pop' Warner (third base)

== Player stats ==
= Indicates team leader

= Indicates league leader

=== Batting ===
Note: G = Games played; AB = At bats; R = Runs scored; H = Hits; 2B = Doubles; 3B = Triples; HR = Home runs; RBI = Runs batted in; SB = Stolen bases; BB = Walks; AVG = Batting average; SLG = Slugging average

Player	G	AB	R	H	2B	3B	HR	RBI	SB	BB	AVG	SLG
Paul Goldschmidt	154	599	70	147	33	1	22	65	11	47	.245	.414
Brendan Donovan	153	587	65	163	34	3	14	73	5	47	.278	.417
Masyn Winn	150	587	85	157	32	5	15	57	11	41	.267	.416
Nolan Arenado	152	578	70	157	23	0	16	71	2	44	.272	.394
Alec Burleson	152	547	71	147	20	0	21	78	9	35	.269	.420
Nolan Gorman	107	365	42	74	15	0	19	50	6	34	.203	.400
Lars Nootbaar	109	348	39	85	18	3	12	45	7	52	.244	.417
Willson Contreras	84	301	48	79	17	0	15	36	4	45	.262	.468
Michael Siani	124	298	42	68	7	2	2	20	20	21	.228	.285
Iván Herrera	72	229	37	69	12	1	5	27	5	25	.301	.428
Pedro Pagés	68	202	19	48	3	2	7	27	2	13	.238	.376
Jordan Walker	51	164	16	33	10	1	5	20	1	10	.201	.366
Victor Scott II	53	145	14	26	9	0	2	10	5	6	.179	.283
Matt Carpenter	59	137	15	32	7	0	4	15	0	15	.234	.372
Dylan Carlson	59	121	12	24	5	0	0	11	0	12	.198	.240
Brandon Crawford	28	71	5	12	5	0	1	4	0	8	.169	.282
José Fermín	45	71	7	11	1	1	0	4	2	7	.155	.197
Tommy Pham	23	68	7	14	3	1	2	12	0	7	.206	.368
Thomas Saggese	18	49	5	10	2	0	1	4	0	2	.204	.306
Luken Baker	21	40	3	7	1	1	2	10	1	7	.175	.400
Team totals	162	5507	672	1363	257	21	165	639	91	478	.248	.392

=== Pitching ===
Note: W = Wins; L = Losses; ERA = Earned run average; G = Games pitched; GS = Games started; SV = Saves; IP = Innings pitched; H = Hits allowed; R = Runs allowed; ER = Earned runs allowed; BB = Walks allowed; SO = Strikeouts

Player	W	L	ERA	G	GS	SV	IP	H	R	ER	BB	SO
Miles Mikolas	10	11	5.35	32	32	0	171.2	194	106	102	25	122
Kyle Gibson	8	8	4.24	30	30	0	169.2	161	91	80	68	151
Sonny Gray	13	9	3.84	28	28	0	166.1	142	79	71	39	203
Andre Pallante	8	8	3.78	29	20	0	121.1	110	55	51	48	94
Lance Lynn	7	4	3.84	23	23	0	117.1	113	64	50	44	109
Matthew Liberatore	3	4	4.40	60	6	0	86.0	81	44	42	28	76
Andrew Kittredge	5	5	2.80	74	0	1	70.2	60	26	22	20	67
Ryan Fernandez	1	6	3.51	62	0	2	66.2	58	30	26	32	71
Ryan Helsley	7	4	2.04	65	0	49	66.1	50	19	15	23	79
John King	3	3	2.85	56	0	0	60.0	58	23	19	14	38
JoJo Romero	7	3	3.36	65	0	1	59.0	52	23	22	16	51
Erick Fedde	2	5	3.72	10	10	0	55.2	49	23	23	18	46
Kyle Leahy	1	1	4.07	33	0	1	48.2	40	23	22	10	33
Steven Matz	1	2	5.08	12	7	0	44.1	49	28	25	15	33
Chris Roycroft	1	2	4.19	27	0	0	34.1	31	19	16	17	33
Michael McGreevy	3	0	1.96	4	3	0	23.0	16	5	5	2	18
Giovanny Gallegos	2	1	6.53	21	0	1	20.2	24	15	15	10	21
Zack Thompson	0	2	9.53	5	2	0	17.0	24	18	18	8	20
Shawn Armstrong	1	0	2.84	11	0	0	12.2	11	4	4	2	12
Nick Robertson	0	0	4.38	8	0	0	12.1	15	6	6	2	14
Riley O'Brien	0	0	11.25	8	0	0	8.0	13	10	10	8	11
Gordon Graceffo	0	1	4.70	2	1	0	7.2	7	4	4	2	6
Ryan Loutos	0	0	0.00	3	0	0	2.1	2	0	0	1	0
Brandon Crawford	0	0	27.00	1	0	0	1.1	3	4	4	2	0
Adam Kloffenstein	0	0	0.00	1	0	0	1.0	0	0	0	0	0
Team totals	83	79	4.03	162	162	55	1444.0	1363	719	647	454	1308

=== Injured List (IL) report ===
(10-days, unless noted)
Cardinals Roster & Staff ("Transactions")
Cardinals injury report

Name (position)	Duration of Injury on DL		Injury type	Disabled list detail	Games missed	Replacement	Ref.
Name (position)	Start	End	Injury type	Disabled list detail	Games missed	Replacement	Ref.
Tommy Edman (SS) (CF)	Mar 27	–	Right wrist strain	Mar 27 (retro., Mar 25); Trans. to 60-day DL, May 6	–	Dylan Carlson (Victor Scott II)	
Drew Rom (LH-reliever)	Mar 27	--	Left shoulder biceps tendinitis	Mar 27 (retro., Mar 25); Trans. to 60-day DL, Apr 30	–	Matthew Liberatore	
Lars Nootbaar (LF)	Mar 27	Apr 11	Left rib fracture	Mar 27 (retro., Mar 25)	13	Brendan Donovan	
Keynan Middleton (RH-reliever)	Mar 27	n/a	Right forearm flexor strain	Mar 27 (retro., Mar 25); Trans. to 60-day DL, Jun 22	162	Matthew Liberatore; Chris Roycroft	
Sonny Gray (RH-starter)	Mar 27	Apr 9	Right hamstring strain	Mar 27 (15-day) (retro., Mar 25)	2 starts (11 games)	Zack Thompson	
Dylan Carlson (CF)	Mar 27	May 5	Left shoulder sprain (collided w/RF Jordan Walker)	Mar 27 (retro., Mar 25)	33	Victor Scott II	
Riley O'Brien (RH-reliever)	Mar 31	–	Right forearm flexor strain.	Mar 31 (15-day) (retro., Mar 29); Trans. to 60-day DL, May 10	–	John King	
Matt Carpenter (DH)	Apr 4	May 11	Right oblique strain	Apr 4 (retro., Apr 2) (activated May 11)	34	n/a (José Fermín optioned)	
Steven Matz (LH-starter)	May 1	–	Lower back strain	May 1 (15-day) Trans. to 60-day DL, Jun 28	–	-- Gordon Graceffo recalled	
Giovanny Gallegos (RH-reliever)	May 6	Jun 21	Right shoulder impingement	May 6 (15-day) (activated Jun 21)	40	Chris Roycroft; Adam Kloffenstein opt.	
Willson Contreras (C)	May 8	Jun 24	Left Ulna fracture (forearm)	May 8 (May 7 injury) (activated Jun 24)	40	Iván Herrera (Pedro Pagés recalled)	
Nick Robertson (RH-reliever)	May 26	Jun 24	Right elbow inflammation	May 26 (15-day) (activated Jun 24)	26	Andre Pallante	
Lars Nootbaar (LF)	May 31	Jul 8	Left oblique strain	May 31 (retro May 30; May 29 injury) (activated Jul 8)	35	Jose Fermin (INF) Jose Fermin (opt.)	
Iván Herrera (C)	Jun 22	Jul 12	Lower back tightness	Jun 22 (retro., Jun 19) (activated Jul 12)	21	Nick Raposo n/a	

== Minor league system and first-year player draft ==
=== Teams ===
Level	Team	League	Division	Manager	W–L/Stats	Standing	Refs
Triple-A	Memphis Redbirds	International League	West	Ben Johnson			
Double-A	Springfield Cardinals	Texas League	North	José Leger			
High-A	Peoria Chiefs	Midwest League	West	Patrick Anderson			
Single-A	Palm Beach Cardinals	Florida State League	East	Gary Kendall			
Rookie	FCL Cardinals	Florida Complex League	East	Roberto Espinoza			
Foreign Rookie	DSL Cardinals	Dominican Summer League	Boca Chica South	Fray Peniche			

=== Major League Baseball draft ===
The 2024 Major League Baseball (MLB) First-Year Player Draft was held in Fort Worth, Texas on July 14–16, after the 2024 MLB Draft Lottery took place on December 5, 2023, in Nashville, Tennessee during the Winter Meetings. The draft assigns amateur baseball players to MLB teams.

The Cardinals in the second annual draft lottery for the 2024 Major League Baseball draft, will get the #7 draft pick that initially projected them with the #5 pick. The Minnesota Twins will have a pick (#33) immediately following the Prospect Promotion Incentive (PPI) picks as compensation for losing Sonny Gray, who signed with the Cardinals after rejecting his qualifying offer from Minnesota. The Cardinals will lose their second-highest draft pick in exchange for signing Gray. The Draft will remain at 20 rounds, and after the first round, the non-postseason teams will choose in reverse order of winning percentage. In all 20 rounds, the playoff clubs will choose in reverse order of their postseason finish (Wild Card losers, Division Series losers, Championship Series losers, World Series loser, World Series winner). Within each of those playoff groups, teams are sorted by revenue-sharing status and then reverse order of winning percentage. Draft experts pick the first 10 who they believe will be signed in July 2024 in Arlington, Texas.

The last time the Cardinals had a Top 10 Draft Pick was in 1998, when they picked at #5, OF'er J. D. Drew.

The Cardinals picked JJ Wetherholt, 21, a shortstop from West Virginia. He rated '70' in Hitting, '60' Running, '50' Power, '50' Field, '50' Arm, and '60' Overall.

2024 St. Louis Cardinals complete draft list

Round	Pick	Name, Age	Pos / Bats (P throws)	School (State)	Signing date	Signing bonus
1	7	JJ Wetherholt, 21	SS-2B / L	West Virginia (WV)	Jul 23	$6.9 million
2	No pick due to the signing of Sonny Gray					
3	80	Brian Holiday, 21	P / R	Oklahoma State (OK)		
4	109	Ryan Campos, 21	C / L	Arizona State (AZ)	Jul 24	$669,300
5	142	Braden Davis, 21	P / L	Oklahoma (OK)	Jul 22	$485,700
6	171	Josh Kross, 21	C / S	Cincinnati (OH)	Jul 23	$369,100
7	201	Andrew Dutkanych IV, 20	P / R	Vanderbilt (TN)	Jul 22	$300,000
8	231	Jack Findlay, 21	P / L	Notre Dame (IN)		
9	261	Cade McGee, 21	3B / R	Texas Tech (TX)	Jul 22	$275,000
10	291	Bryce Madron, 23	OF / L	Oklahoma (OK)	Jul 17	---
11	321	Jon Jon Gazdar, 22	SS / R	Austin Peay (TN)		
12	351	Ian Petrutz, 21	OF / L	Alabama (AL)	Jul 22	$250,000
13	381	Nolan Sparks, 21	P / R	Rochester (NY)	Jul 22	$250,000
14	411	Mason Burns, 22	P / R	Western Kentucky (KY)	Jul 22	$80,000
15	441	Sam Brodersen, 22	P / R	Louisiana Tech (LA)		
16	471	Deniel Ortiz, 19 (PR)	3B / R	Walters State CC (TN)	Jul 22	$200,000
17	501	Brandt Thompson, 22	P / R	Missouri State (MO)	Jul 23	$10,000
18	531	Christian Martin, 21	SS / L	Virginia Tech (VA)	Jul 22	$150,000
19	561	Brendan Lawson, 18 (CAN)	SS / L	P27 Academy (SC)		---
20	591	Owen Rice, 21	P / L	Milwaukee (WI)	Jul 22	$150,000
