= Alfonso Rivas =

American baseball player (born 1996)

Free agent
- First baseman / Outfielder
- Born: September 13, 1996 (age 29); Chula Vista, California, U.S.
- Bats: Left Throws: Left

MLB debut
- August 29, 2021, for the Chicago Cubs

MLB statistics (through 2023 season)
- Batting average: .243
- Home runs: 7
- Runs batted in: 43
- Stats at Baseball Reference

Teams
- Chicago Cubs (2021–2022); San Diego Padres (2023); Pittsburgh Pirates (2023)

Alfonso Rivas III (born September 13, 1996) is a Mexican-American professional baseball first baseman and outfielder who is a free agent. He has previously played in Major League Baseball (MLB) for the Chicago Cubs, San Diego Padres, and Pittsburgh Pirates.

== Amateur career ==
Rivas was born on the side of the road along Interstate 805 and raised in Tijuana before moving to Chula Vista, California when he was in the fourth grade. Rivas attended La Jolla Country Day School in La Jolla, California, graduating in 2015. He enrolled at the University of Arizona where he played college baseball. In 2016 he batted .247/.329/.332. In 2017, as a sophomore, he played in 58 games and batted .371 with seven home runs, 64 RBIs, and 54 runs. He played in the Cape Cod Baseball League for the Yarmouth–Dennis Red Sox that summer. As a junior in 2018, Rivas appeared in 56 games in which he hit .347 with seven home runs and 52 RBIs. Following the season's end, he was selected by the Oakland Athletics in the fourth round of the 2018 Major League Baseball draft.

== Professional career ==
=== Oakland Athletics ===
Rivas signed with Oakland and made his professional debut in 2018 with the Vermont Lake Monsters of the Low-A New York–Penn League, with whom he hit .285 with one home run, 28 RBIs, and 16 doubles over 61 games, winning the team's MVP award. To begin the 2019 season, he was assigned to the Stockton Ports of the High-A California League (with whom he was named an All-Star) before being promoted to the Las Vegas Aviators of the Triple-A Pacific Coast League in late August. Over 122 games between the two clubs, he slashed .292/.387/.423 with nine home runs, sixty RBIs, and 26 doubles.

=== Chicago Cubs ===
On January 13, 2020, Rivas was traded to the Chicago Cubs in exchange for Tony Kemp. He did not play a minor league game in 2020 due to the cancellation of the season caused by the COVID-19 pandemic. He was assigned to the Iowa Cubs of the Triple-A East to begin the 2021 season. He missed nearly all of May and a majority of June due to injury.

On August 28, 2021, the Cubs selected Rivas' contract and promoted him to the major leagues. At the time of his promotion, he was slashing .284/.405/.411 with four home runs, 32 RBIs, and 13 doubles over 58 games with Iowa. He made his MLB debut the next day starting at first base against the Chicago White Sox at Wrigley Field, collecting two hits in three at-bats as the Cubs lost 13-1. On September 14, he hit his first MLB home run against Kyle Gibson of the Philadelphia Phillies. On September 21, he was placed on the injured list with a finger injury, thus ending his first MLB season prematurely; over 44 at-bats with the Cubs, Rivas batted .318 with one home run and three RBIs.

In 2022 with the Cubs he batted .235/.322/.307. He was designated for assignment on December 23, 2022. He was released on January 5, 2023.

=== San Diego Padres ===
On January 12, 2023, Rivas signed a minor league contract with the San Diego Padres organization. In 44 games for the Triple-A El Paso Chihuahuas, he hit .319/.440/.571 with 8 home runs, 33 RBI, and 4 stolen bases. On June 2, Rivas had his contract selected to the major league roster.

=== Pittsburgh Pirates ===
On August 1, 2023, Rivas, Estuar Suero, and Jackson Wolf were traded to the Pittsburgh Pirates in exchange for Ji-man Choi and Rich Hill. In 40 games for Pittsburgh, Rivas hit .234/.305/.436 with 3 home runs and 14 RBI.

=== St. Louis Cardinals ===
On November 2, 2023, Rivas was claimed off waivers by the Cleveland Guardians. The Guardians designated him for assignment on December 15 and he was claimed off waivers by the Los Angeles Angels on December 22, who designated him for assignment on January 23, to make room for Robert Stephenson on the 40-man roster. On January 29, Rivas was claimed off waivers again, this time by the St. Louis Cardinals. He was optioned to the Triple–A Memphis Redbirds to begin the 2024 season. He was designated for assignment following the promotion of Ryan Loutos on May 20. Rivas cleared waivers and was sent outright to Memphis on May 23. He was released by the Cardinals organization on September 26.

=== Algodoneros de Unión Laguna ===
On March 22, 2025, Rivas signed with the Algodoneros de Unión Laguna of the Mexican League. In 33 appearances for the team, he batted .215/.291/.333 with two home runs, 15 RBI, and four stolen bases.

In 2026, Rivas slashed .250/.381/.346 with one home run, eight RBI, and one stolen base across 28 games for the Algodoneros.

=== Leones de Yucatán ===
On May 28, 2026, Rivas was traded to the Leones de Yucatán of the Mexican League in exchange for Yadir Drake. In 23 appearances for the team, he slashed .295/.440/.397 with one home run and eight RBI. On July 1, Rivas was released by Yucatán.

== Personal life ==
Rivas was little league teammates with fellow professional baseball player Javier Assad when the two grew up in Tijuana, Mexico. Rivas and Assad became teammates on the Chicago Cubs following Assad's promotion in 2022.
