= José Fermín =

Dominican baseball player (born 1999)

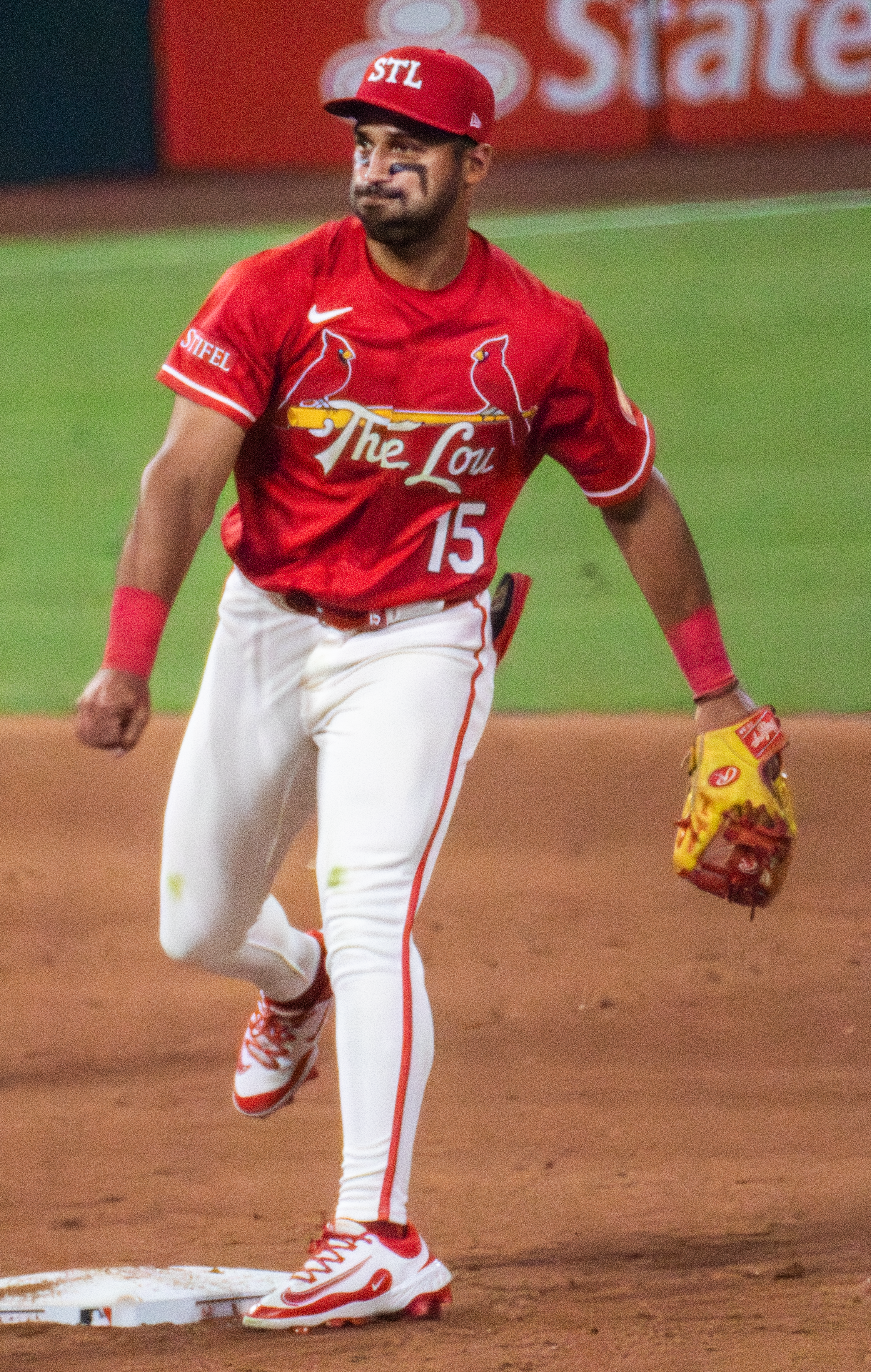
- Fermín with the St. Louis Cardinals in 2025

St. Louis Cardinals – No. 15
- Utility player
- Born: March 29, 1999 (age 27); Puerto Plata, Dominican Republic
- Bats: Right Throws: Right

MLB debut
- July 7, 2023, for the St. Louis Cardinals

MLB statistics (through 2026 season)
- Batting average: .238
- Home runs: 7
- Runs batted in: 58
- Stats at Baseball Reference

Teams
- St. Louis Cardinals (2023–present)

José Miguel Fermín Garcia (born March 29, 1999) is a Dominican professional baseball utility player for the St. Louis Cardinals of Major League Baseball (MLB). He made his MLB debut in 2023.

== Career ==
=== Cleveland Indians/Guardians ===
Fermín signed with the Cleveland Indians as an international free agent on July 2, 2015. He spent his first two professional seasons at the rookie–level, hitting .224 in 16 games Dominican Summer League Indians in 2016, and batting .229 in 45 games for the Arizona League Indians in 2017.

Fermín spent the 2018 season with the Low–A Mahoning Valley Scrappers, playing in 71 games and hitting .279/.391/.383 with two home runs, 26 RBI, and 17 stolen bases. He played the 2019 season for the Single–A Lake County Captains, slashing .293/.374/.379 with six home runs, 41 RBI, and 28 stolen bases across 105 contests. Fermín did not play in a game in 2020 due to the cancellation of the minor league season because of the COVID-19 pandemic.

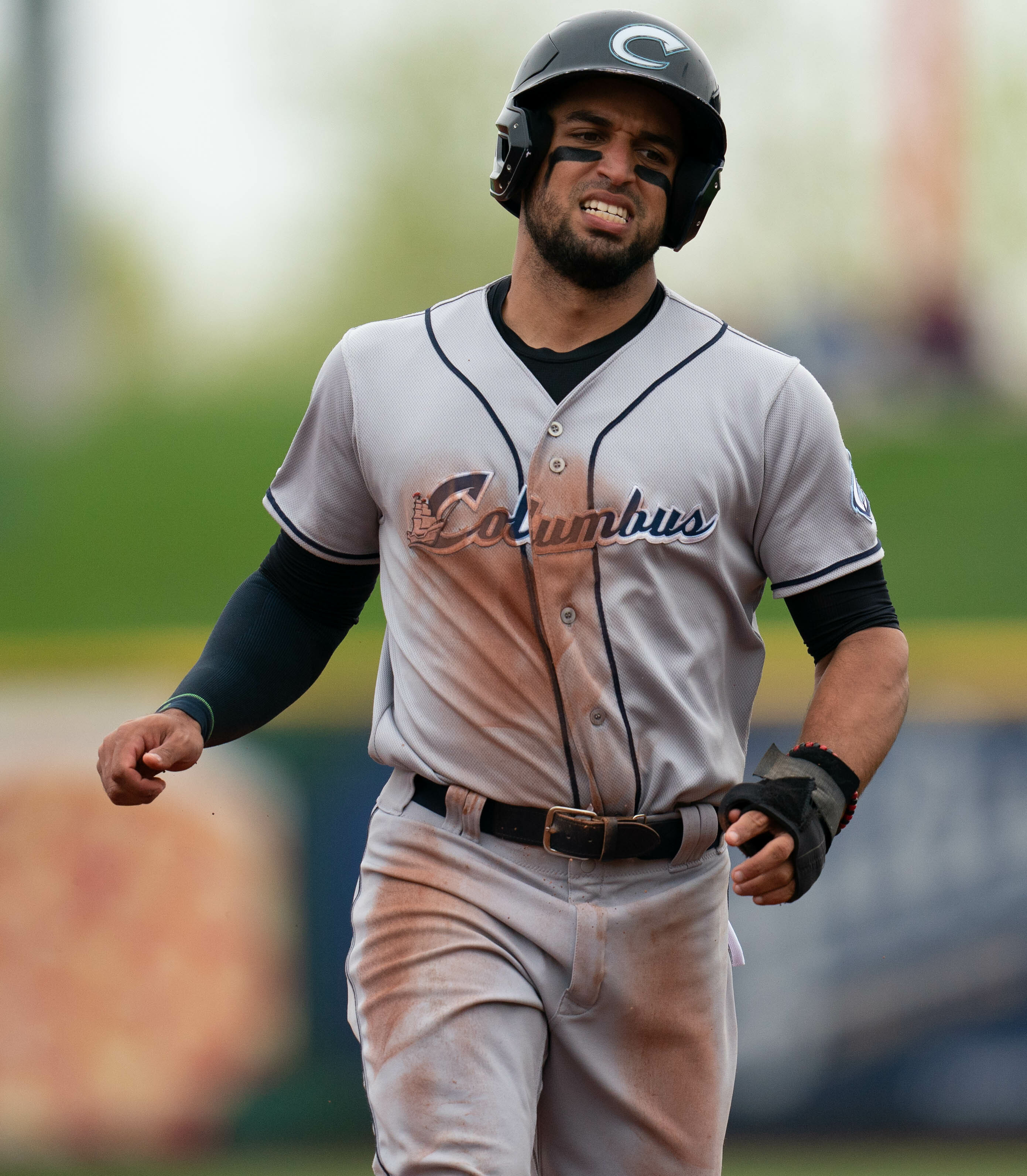
Fermín with the Columbus Clippers in 2022

Fermín returned to action in 2021, spending the year with the Double–A Akron RubberDucks as well as making four appearances for the Triple–A Columbus Clippers at the end of the year. In 84 games for Akron, he logged a .258/.329/.383 batting line with six home runs and 39 RBI. Fermín spent the entirety of the 2022 season with Columbus, appearing in 90 games and hitting .215/.336/.322 with six home runs, 31 RBI, and nine stolen bases.

=== St. Louis Cardinals ===
On November 9, 2022, the St. Louis Cardinals acquired Fermín from the Guardians and he was added to their 40-man roster. Fermín suffered a quadriceps strain in spring training and was optioned to the Triple-A Memphis Redbirds to begin the 2023 season. On July 7, 2023, Fermín was promoted to the major leagues for the first time. In 21 games for St. Louis, he batted .235/.339/.255 with no home runs and four RBI.

Fermín was optioned to Triple–A Memphis to begin the 2024 season. In 45 appearances for the Cardinals, he batted .155/.241/.197 with four RBI and two stolen bases.

Fermín was again optioned to Triple-A Memphis to begin the 2025 season. On July 13, 2025, Fermín hit his first career home run off of Jesse Chavez of the Atlanta Braves, a game that was Chavez's final MLB appearance.

Fermín made the Cardinals' Opening Day roster in 2026.
