= Pedro Pagés (catcher) =

Venezuelan baseball player (born 1998)

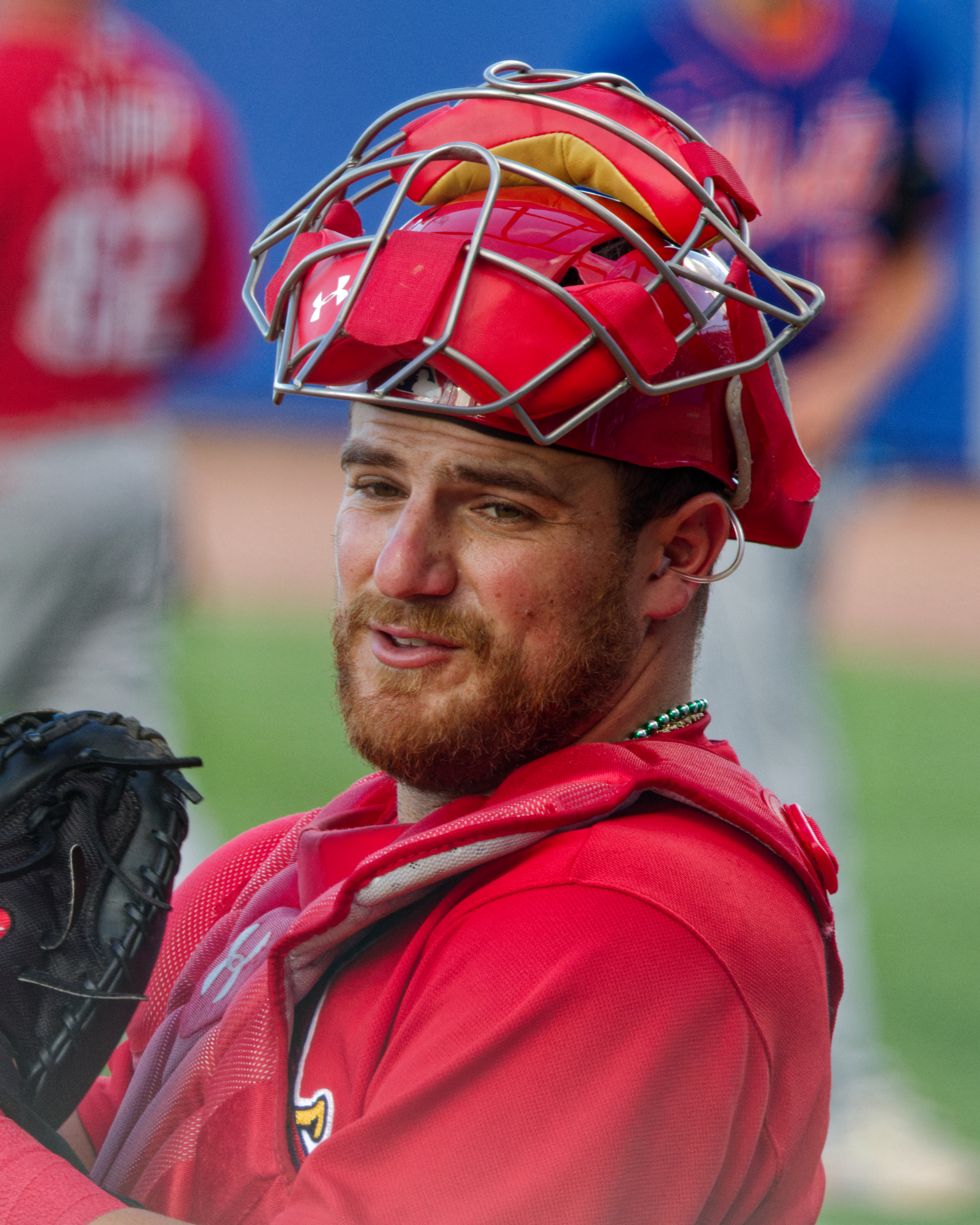
- Pagés with the St. Louis Cardinals in 2023

St. Louis Cardinals – No. 43
- Catcher
- Born: September 17, 1998 (age 28); Maracay, Venezuela
- Bats: Right Throws: Right

MLB debut
- April 7, 2024, for the St. Louis Cardinals

MLB statistics (through 2026 season)
- Batting average: .229
- Home runs: 22
- Runs batted in: 84
- Stats at Baseball Reference

Teams
- St. Louis Cardinals (2024–present)

Pedro José Pagés (born September 17, 1998) is a Venezuelan professional baseball catcher for the St. Louis Cardinals of Major League Baseball (MLB). He made his MLB debut in 2024.

== College career ==
Pagés graduated from Gulliver Preparatory School and played college baseball at Florida Atlantic University. In 2018, he played collegiate summer baseball with the Hyannis Harbor Hawks of the Cape Cod Baseball League and was named a league all-star.

== Professional career ==
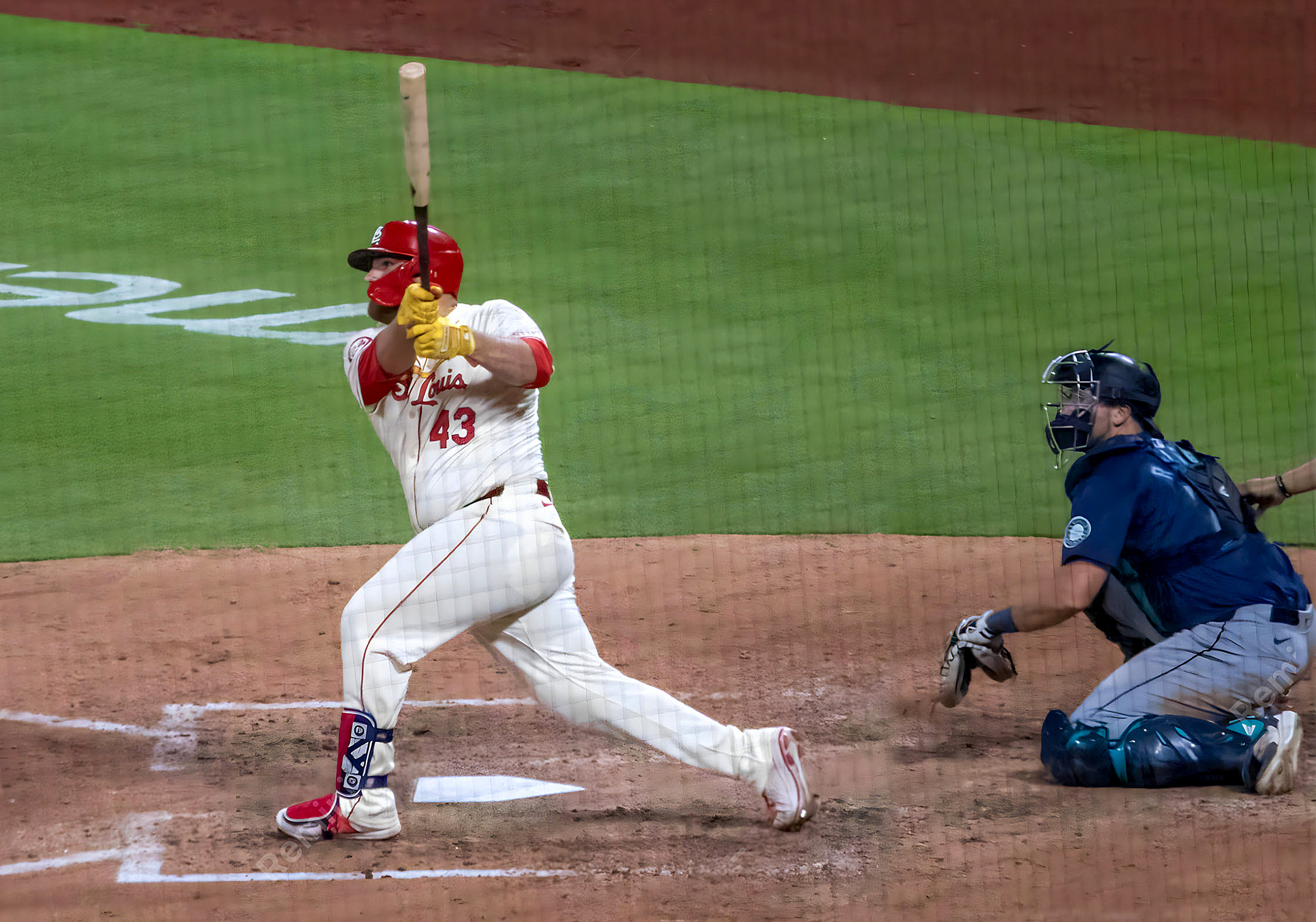
Pagés hitting game-winning two-run HR vs the Seattle Mariners on August 7, 2024

Pagés was drafted by the St. Louis Cardinals in the sixth round, with the 185th overall selection, of the 2019 Major League Baseball draft. He made his professional debut with the Low-A State College Spikes, hitting .291 with two home runs and 21 RBI in 50 games. Pagés did not play in a game in 2020 due to the cancellation of the minor league season because of the COVID-19 pandemic.

He returned to action in 2021 with the High-A Peoria Chiefs, playing in 80 games and batting .249/.337/.385 with nine home runs and 39 RBI. Pagés split the 2022 season between the Double-A Springfield Cardinals and Triple-A Memphis Redbirds. In 86 games for the two affiliates, he hit a cumulative .227/.312/.381 with 10 home runs and 44 RBI.

Pagés spent the 2023 campaign with Double-A Springfield, compiling a .267/.362/.443 batting line with career-highs in home runs (16) and RBI (72) across 117 games. On November 14, 2023, the Cardinals added Pagés to their 40-man roster to protect him from the Rule 5 draft.

Pagés was optioned to the Triple-A Memphis Redbirds to begin the 2024 season. On April 4, 2024, Matt Carpenter was placed on the 10 day injured list, resulting in Pagés being promoted to the major leagues for the first time. He made his MLB debut on April 7 as a pinch hitter. On April 11, Pagés was sent down, but just 10 days later he was called back up. This was a corresponding move as Victor Scott II was optioned to Triple-A. On April 30, Pagés hit a sacrifice fly for his first run batted in. His first career hit came on May 14, in a key at-bat with the bases full in the third inning against the Los Angeles Angels at Angel Stadium. Pagés hit a double that drove in all three runners as part of a 7–6 victory. His first career home run was a go-ahead homer against the Chicago Cubs. In 68 appearances during his rookie campaign, Pagés slashed .238/.281/.376 with seven home runs, 27 RBI, and two stolen bases.

On April 11, 2025, Pagés made his first professional appearance at second base after Masyn Winn left the game due to injury.
