= Ryan Loutos =

American baseball player (born 1999)

Seattle Mariners
- Pitcher
- Born: January 29, 1999 (age 27); Elk Grove Village, Illinois, U.S.
- Bats: Right Throws: Right

MLB debut
- June 1, 2024, for the St. Louis Cardinals

MLB statistics (through 2025 season)
- Win–loss record: 1–0
- Earned run average: 10.67
- Strikeouts: 8
- Stats at Baseball Reference

Teams
- St. Louis Cardinals (2024); Los Angeles Dodgers (2025); Washington Nationals (2025)

Ryan William Loutos (born January 29, 1999) is an American professional baseball pitcher in the Seattle Mariners organization. He has previously played in Major League Baseball (MLB) for the St. Louis Cardinals, Los Angeles Dodgers, and Washington Nationals. He made his MLB debut in 2024.

== Amateur career ==
Loutos attended Barrington High School in Barrington, Illinois, where he played baseball and posted a 0.47 earned run average (ERA) and 92 strikeouts over 59 innings pitched as senior in 2017. After high school, he enrolled at Washington University in St. Louis, where he played college baseball. As a senior in 2021, he went 11–1 with a 1.33 ERA over 13 starts.

In 2020 and 2021, Loutos played collegiate summer baseball for the Fond du Lac Dock Spiders of the Northwoods League.

== Professional career ==
=== St. Louis Cardinals ===
Loutos went unselected in the 2021 Major League Baseball draft and signed with the St. Louis Cardinals as an undrafted free agent on July 22, 2021. He made his professional debut with the Palm Beach Cardinals, going 1–2 with a 5.56 ERA over 22 2/3 innings. He opened the 2022 season with the Peoria Chiefs and was promoted to the Springfield Cardinals and Memphis Redbirds during the season. Over 46 games (two starts) between the three teams, he went 3–6 with a 3.96 ERA and 72 strikeouts over 63 2/3 innings. He was selected to play in the Arizona Fall League for the Salt River Rafters after the season. He returned to Springfield to open the 2023 season and was quickly promoted to Memphis. Over 50 relief appearances, Loutos went 2–5 with a 6.53 ERA and 84 strikeouts over 73 innings.

Loutos began the 2024 season with Triple–A Memphis, compiling a 1.72 ERA with 18 strikeouts and four saves across 13 appearances. On May 20, 2024, he was selected to the 40-man roster and promoted to the major leagues for the first time. Loutos made his Major League debut on Saturday, June 1, in the bottom of the eighth inning against the Philadelphia Phillies. He threw one scoreless inning with one walk and one hit allowed. Loutos made three scoreless appearances during his rookie campaign, allowing one walk and two hits over 2 1/3 innings pitched.

Loutos was optioned to Triple-A Memphis to begin the 2025 season. He allowed three runs to score in eight innings before being designated for assignment by the Cardinals on April 28.

=== Los Angeles Dodgers ===
On May 1, 2025, Loutos was traded to the Los Angeles Dodgers in exchange for cash considerations. He was initially assigned to the Triple-A Oklahoma City Comets before being called up by the Dodgers on May 16. Loutos recorded his first major league strikeout in his Dodgers debut that night against Tim Anderson of the Los Angeles Angels. He allowed five runs in three innings over two games for the Dodgers and two runs in 10 2/3 innings over seven games for Oklahoma City before he was designated for assignment on June 6.

=== Washington Nationals ===
On June 10, 2025, Loutos was claimed off waivers by the Washington Nationals. On June 19, Loutos recorded his first career win after allowing no earned runs in the 11th inning of a 3-4 victory over the Colorado Rockies. In 10 appearances for Washington, he struggled to a 12.00 ERA with six strikeouts over nine innings of work.

=== Seattle Mariners ===
On November 6, 2025, Loutos was claimed off waivers by the Seattle Mariners. Loutos was optioned to the Triple-A Tacoma Rainiers to begin the 2026 season. He was designated for assignment by Seattle on March 31, 2026, and was ultimately released two days later. Loutos re-signed with the Mariners organization on a minor league contract on April 7. On April 20, he was placed on the full-season injured list ruling him out for the entire 2026 season without appearing in a game.
