= 2026 St. Louis Cardinals season =

Major League Baseball season

2026 St. Louis Cardinals
- League: National League
- Division: Central
- Ballpark: Busch Stadium
- City: St. Louis, Missouri
- Record: 77–85 (.475)
- Divisional place: 4th
- Owner: William DeWitt Jr.
- President: Bill DeWitt III
- President of baseball operations: Chaim Bloom
- Manager: Oliver Marmol
- Television: MLB Local Media (Chip Caray, Tom Ackerman, Brad Thompson, Al Hrabosky, Rick Ankiel, Jim Hayes, Scott Warmann, Tom Pagnozzi, Mark Sweeney)
- Radio: KMOX NewsRadio 1120; St. Louis Cardinals Radio Network (John Rooney, Rick Horton, Mike Claiborne)
- Stats: ESPN.com; Baseball Reference

The 2026 St. Louis Cardinals season was the 145th season for the St. Louis Cardinals, a Major League Baseball franchise in St. Louis, Missouri. It was also the 135th season for the Cardinals in the National League and their 21st at Busch Stadium.

The season marked the first full season for Chaim Bloom in his role of President of Baseball Operations for the team, who quickly began replenishing the club's minor league system by working with three veteran players to waive their no-trade clauses & trade them to different teams in exchange for prospects (with the Cardinals throwing in cash to cover part of the veterans' future salary obligations) before the start of Spring Training. The team's new philosophy of developing & deploying young talent was evidenced by the 2026 season encompassing the Major League debut of thirteen rookies, including Leo Bernal, Joshua Báez, and JJ Wetherholt. Out of the rookies who debuted during the season, Wetherholt signed a long term extension with the team during the course of the season. The 2026 campaign also marked a breakout year for outfielder Jordan Walker, as he improved in nearly all batting categories compared to the prior season, & won the 2026 Home Run Derby. Initially defying preseason predictions of a mediocre-to-bad win-loss record, the team finished one game above .500 in March, then parlayed that into moving nine games above a .500 record on May 19th, before pulling back in winning percentage by the All Star break. Shortly before reaching the nine-games-above .500 mark, the team experienced an exciting event by becoming the focus of the Tarps Off movement courtesy of support from the Stephen F. Austin State University club baseball team beginning with an extra inning win on May 15th.

After signing Dustin May to a one year contract as a free agent prior to the start of the season, May's rebound year prompted Bloom to enact a trade deadline deal to acquire prospects. The team experienced baseball history in August, as rookie Joshua Báez became the first player in Major League history to hit a home run in his first three Major League at-bats. September 12th was a historic day in particular for the franchise, as Yadier Molina and Albert Pujols were inducted into the team's Hall of Fame during an emotional pregame ceremony. After incurring a major blow to its chances of winning the third Wild Card spot via a five-game losing streak towards the end of August, the team was in contention to finish with a .500 record until mid-September, but proceeded to lose eight of their last ten games though to end the season with 77 wins. At season's end Alec Burleson had a career year in 2026 in addition to Walker, with Burleson leading the entire Major Leagues with 116 RBI at the end of the regular season.

== Offseason departures and acquisitions ==
After new President of Baseball Operations, Chaim Bloom, stepped into his role following the end of the 2025 season, he quickly embarked on making major changes to the roster and implementing the organization's revised strategy. One of Bloom's first notable moves in the offseason was to trade Sonny Gray to the Boston Red Sox, Bloom's most recent employer before onboarding with the Cardinals as a consultant. Gray agreed to waive his no trade clause to go to the Red Sox, and for the return part of the trade the Red Sox sent over right-handed pitcher Richard Fitts and left-handed pitcher Brandon Clarke (who was the Red Sox's number five prospect per MLB Pipeline at the time of the trade) to St. Louis. Just over a month later Wilson Contreras also agreed to waive his no-trade clause to go to the Red Sox as well. In return for sending Contreras and cash to the Red Sox (that went towards covering part of Contreras's salary), the Cardinals received right hand pitchers Hunter Dobbins, Yhoiker Fajardo (who was Boston’s No. 23 prospect in MLB Pipeline rankings at the time of the trade) and Blake Aita. On January 14, 2026, veteran Nolan Arenado was traded to the Arizona Diamondbacks, along with $31 million in cash to offset the $42 million that Arenado is owed over the next two seasons, for minor league right-hander Jack Martinez, an eighth-round draft pick out of Arizona State. Another noteworthy pre-season move by Bloom was to extend the contract of manager Oli Marmol for another two years.

=== Free Agency Transactions ===
“We are not prioritizing short-term success over what needs to happen in the long term...Even with that, my mindset is that you’re never going to stop trying to win and there is some way by where you’ll always assess where you are in the standings. That’s not going to change, it’s just also the case that we can’t let that distract us from where we need to go, and with respect to that bigger goal regardless of the standings.”

— Chaim Bloom addresses the media at the Cardinals 2026 Winter Warm Up event on January 17, 2026

In tandem with large organizational change across the board, the Cardinals did not attempt to re-sign veteran starting pitcher Miles Mikolas, who had been on the team since 2017, who then signed a one year deal with Washington Nationals on February 11, 2026. In terms of free agency additions, the most notable pickup for the Cardinals was starting pitcher Dustin May, who signed a one year deal for $20.5 million in December 2025. Additionally, the team added bullpen depth via free agency by signing Ryne Stanek to a one year deal for $3.5 million on January 13, with a $6 million club option for 2027.

== Preseaon Projections & Predictions ==
Preseason predictions regarding how many wins the 2026 Cardinals would accrue were generally unfavorable, with some hope for something closer to a .500 winning percentage given the team's unproven young talent. For instance, on February 10, 2026, well before the roster was finalized, Baseball Prospectus's PECOTA system predicted 66 wins and 96 losses for the team. Closer to the start of the regular season, Fangraph's "ZiPS" projection system predicted on March 26th that the Cardinals would finish last in the N.L. Central with a record of 76-86. Worse yet, the aggregate consensus among sports gamblers was that the team would win fewer games than that, with DraftKings website predicting 71.5 wins for the team, while both FanDuel & BetMGM placed the team's win total at 69.5 wins as of March 28th.

== Spring Training ==
Over the course of the 2026 Grapefruit League spring training schedule, the Cardinals accrued a win-loss record of 17-9, good for second place in the Grapefruit League that year. The Spring Training season was not without uncertainty for Cardinals fans however, as by mid-March Jordan Walker's slow start to the spring was causing concern about his future. However, a very strong at-bat in the March 23rd game against the Houston Astros seemingly marked a breakthrough for Walker, where a savvy ABS challenge he made during his third inning at-bat helped him avoid a strikeout, & after that he hit the next pitch over the centerfield fence for a home run. Non-roster invitee Nelson Velázquez turned heads with a strong offensive performance during Spring Training, but missed out on a promotion to the big league club over fellow outfielder Nathan Church.

=== Cardinals in the World Baseball Classic ===
As in past years, the 2026 World Baseball Classic was held concurrently with Spring Training. In terms of Cardinals players who already had Major League experience, Thomas Saggese was the notable name who participated in the Classic, as he played for Team Italy along with Gordon Graceffo. Yadier Molina, an active coach with the team, was the manager for Team Puerto Rico during the tournament as well. Participation by Cardinals players was vastly decreased compared to the 2023 World Baseball Classic, possibly over concerns on how poorly the Cardinals started the 2023 when many players missed significant time away from the team & Spring Training due to tournament participation.

== Regular Season ==
=== March - Opening Day Fun & a Surprise Start ===
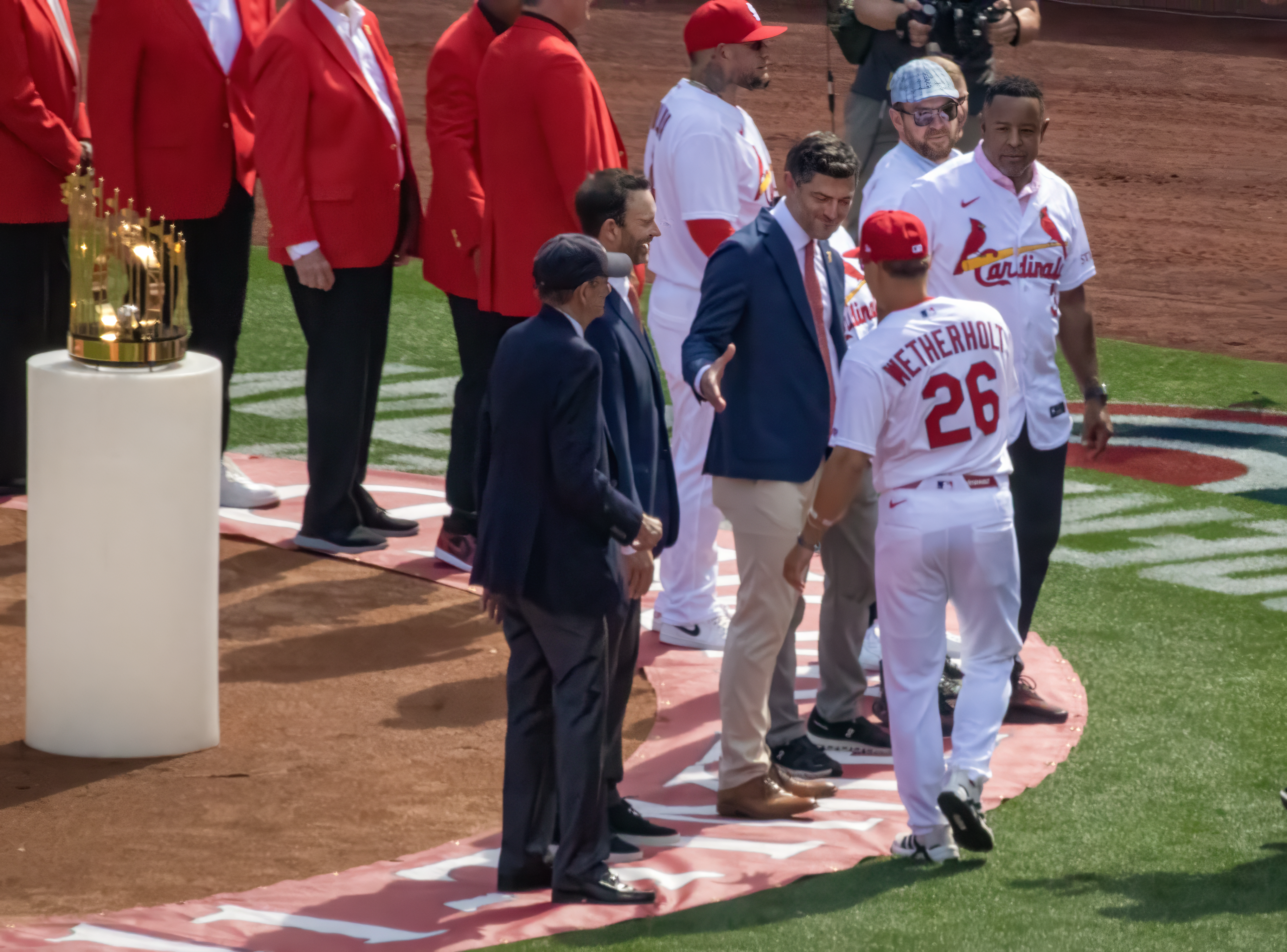
JJ Wetherholt greets Cardinals President of Baseball Operations Chaim Bloom during Opening Day pre-game ceremonies at Busch Stadium in St. Louis, MO on March 26, 2026.

The Cardinals opened the regular season at home against the Tampa Bay Rays on March 26, 2026. In a dramatic game filled with many twists and turns, rookie JJ Wetherholt hit a home run in the third inning for his first big league hit to give the Cardinals a 1-0 lead. In the top of the fifth with one out, Nathan Church dispelled questions about why he was chosen over Nelson Velázquez for the big league roster, as he made a leaping catch at the wall that possibly saved a home run. After the Rays got to Cardinal pitching by scoring six times over the course of facing three different pitchers in the top of the sixth inning, the Cardinals entered the bottom half of that frame down 7-1. A dramatic comeback ensued, where Wetherholt hit a long fly with the bases loaded for an out, only to be followed up by a exciting home run by Alec Burleson which put the Cardinals back out in front. The Cardinals bullpen took things from there, closing out the game without the Rays scoring again.

After an off day the following day, the Cardinals proceeded to go 2-0 on the season with an win on March 28th. However, when Dustin May struggled in his first outing of the year on March 29th, the Rays took advantage & came away with an 11-7 win against the Cardinals. Riley O'Brien earned his first save of the year on March 31st at home against the New York Mets, and would quickly emerge as the team's closing pitcher. After splitting the March 30th & 31st games against the New York Mets at home, the team found itself one game above the .500 mark at the end of the month.

=== April - Walker's Success & Defying Expectations ===
The Cardinals parlayed being one game over the .500 mark at end of March into a strong April, where they defied many preseason predictions of having a subpar team, & instead ended the month of April only two games back from the lead in their division. Jordan Walker earned national attention by going on a home run hot streak, culminating in hitting his eight home run of the year on in April 13th 9-3 loss to the Cleveland Guardians, but which put him in the MLB lead for home runs at that point in the season. Walker's success was contrasted by supbar pitching, in particular the surprisingly bad performance of Matt Svanson, who surrendered five earned runs in one inning of work on April 11 against the Boston Red Sox and by April 13 had an ERA of 15.58, a major departure from his dominate 2025 performance.

=== May - Tarps Off ===
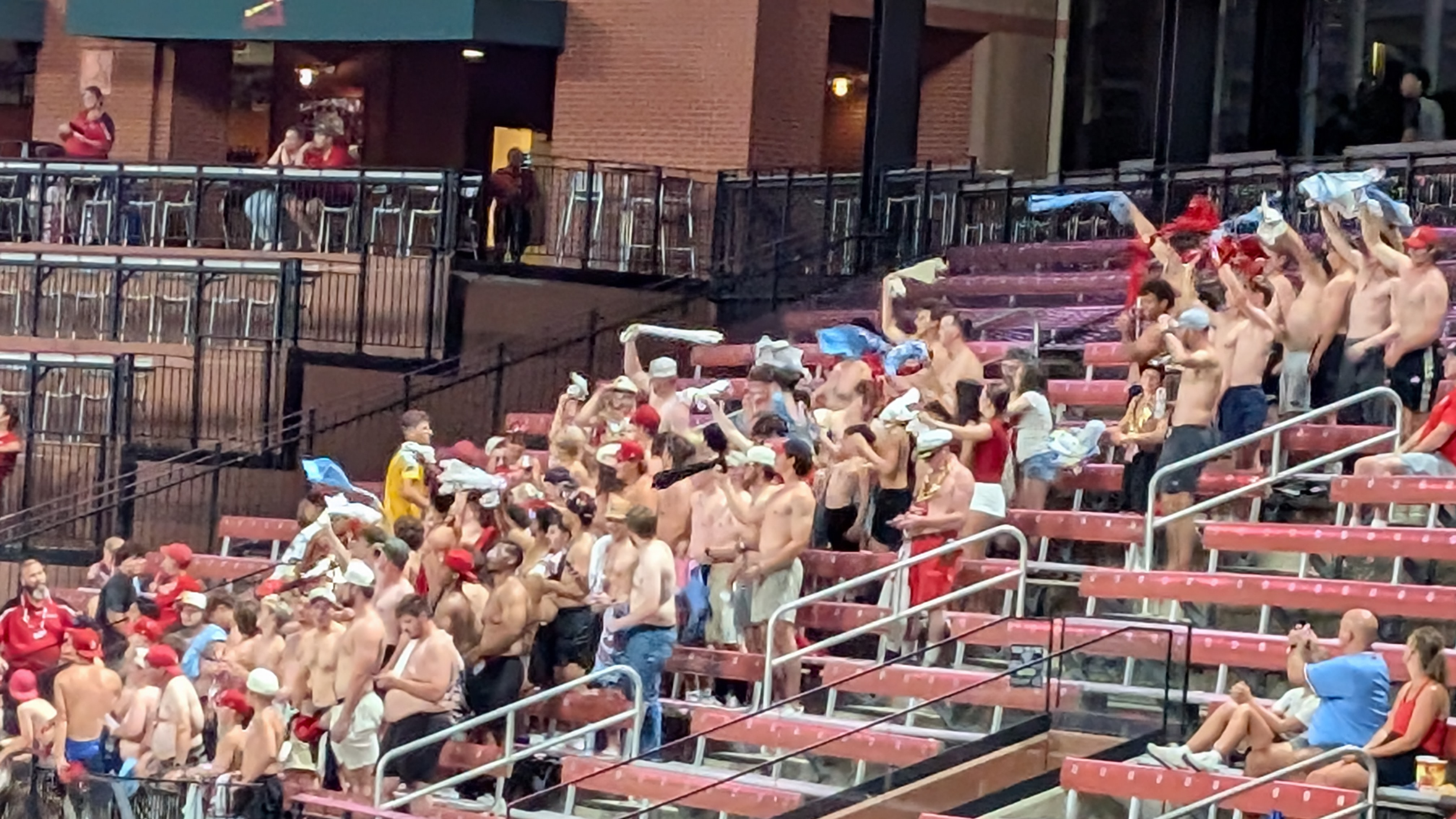
Picture of the Tarps Off fan section at Busch Stadium in St. Louis, MO on 26 Aug 2026 during the Baltimore Orioles vs. St. Louis Cardinals baseball game

On May 15th, 2026, the team's season was met with an unexpected event. The Stephen F. Austin State University club baseball team initiated a movement dubbed "Tarps Off", where by they took their t-shirts off during the game & waved them as a way to cheer the Cardinals on. The tactic worked, as the Cardinals rallied to an extra-inning win against the Kansas City Royals that night. At the post game press conference, before any reporter could ask a question of him, team manager Oli Marmol said, "“Whoever started that in right field, I'll do whatever I need to do to make sure they come every game,” Marmol said Friday. “Because that was awesome. Not only them, but everybody that showed up today. That was a fun environment.”

Subsequently, the next day on social media, team manager Oli Marmol offered to buy tickets to any fans wanting to sit in right field Lodge area & who would "bring the energy." After the Cardinals were again victorious that evening, the club baseball team members were invited by manager Oli Marmol into the team's clubhouse after the end of the game the next night as a gesture of appreciation of their enthusiasm & spirit. The team then declared a section of the right field stands the "Tarps Off" fan section for the remainder of the season, whereby anyone with a ticket to the game is welcome to stand in that fan supporter section.

“I think it brings a lot of energy we’ve been lacking the past few years...It gets everyone going, gets the crowd into it. It takes the energy way up.”

— Tarps Off section member CJ Blaze speaks in late May 2026 about impact of the Tarps Off section at Busch Stadium

=== June - Peak (again) & Pullback ===
The first half of the month of June went reasonably well for the Cardinals. On June 16th, they hit nine games above .500 once again, but also yet again, failed to move to ten games above .500, something that the team hadn't done since the 2022 season. After that, the team slid back in the standings, marked by a four game losing streak towards the end of June.

=== July - All Stars & Noteworthy Home Run Derby ===
July 10th was an important day for both the team & JJ Wetherholt, as he signed an eight year extension with the team for $112.5 million, a contact that runs through the end of the 2034 season. Also in July, three Cardinals were named to represent the National League in the 2026 MLB All Star Game: Jordan Walker, Riley O'Brien, and Ivan Herrera. Additionally, Walker was selected to participant in the 2026 Home Run Derby held the night prior to the All Star Game. Going into the competition still relatively an unknown on the national stage, Walker was able to overcome the hometown Phillies fans pushing for hometown players Kyle Schwaber & Bryce Harper to unexpectedly win the Derby. This marked the first time an active Cardinals player won the Home Run Derby.

Aside from Walker's triumph at the Home Run Derby, the month of July marked another pullback in the team's overall performance, starting the month 8.5 games behind in the Central Division, and finishing the month 14.5 games behind in the division.

=== August - Trade Deadline, & Home Run History for Baez ===
I’m telling you, we are talking about a minute – maybe – when those last two trades actually went in and got confirmed.

— Chaim Bloom talks about how close two major trades for the Cardinals were before the 2026 trade deadline.

The MLB trade deadline saw two notable trades by Chaim Bloom & the Cardinals. First, the Cardinals engaged in an uncommon inter-division trade with the Milwaukee Brewers, sending starting pitcher Dustin May and relief pitcher JoJo Romero to the Brewers in exchange for Alexander Frias and Josiah Ragsdale, who are both prospects who play outfield positions. Next, the Cardinals traded Lars Nootbaar to the Arizona Diamondbacks for RHP Daniel Eagen, LHP Sandro Santana, and a player to be named later. It wasn't until October 1, after both the Cardinals & Diamondbacks seasons had ended, that the Diamondbacks named right handed pitching prospect Brian Curley as that player to be named later. General Manager Bloom for the Cardinals was quoted regarding the last-minute of the deals before the end of the trade deadline by saying, "“I’m telling you, we are talking about a minute – maybe – when those last two trades actually went in and got confirmed."

August 15, 2026 marked the Major League debut for Joshua Báez, as he was placed into the lineup as the Cardinals' starting left fielder against the Chicago Cubs at Wrigley Field. He hit a home run on the first pitch of his first MLB plate appearance off Cubs starting pitcher Matthew Boyd. In his next plate appearance, he hit another home run off Boyd, then made history by hitting a third home run in his third plate appearance, which again came against pitcher Boyd. He made MLB history by being the first person to hit three home runs in his first three at bats, or in his major league debut. Báez finished his first career MLB game 3-for-4 with three home runs and five RBI in an 8-4 Cardinals victory. Baez cooled down at the plate considerably after his debut though, notching only two hits in his next 32 at bats through August 24th. The Cardinals as a team cooled off too, as their hopes for winning the final wild card spot in the National League suffered a major blow via a three game sweep on the road at the hands of the Philadelphia Phillies, which moved the team back to 5.5 games out of the final wildcard sport as of August 25th.

Alec Burleson provided a high note for himself and the team to finish out the month by notching is 100th RBI of the season in a 5-4 loss to the Pittsburgh Pirates on Sunday, August 30th. Burleson became the first Cardinals player since 2022 to reach the 100 RBI mark, and the first left-handed Cardinals batter with 100 RBI in a season since Jim Edmonds in 2004.

=== September - Push for a .500 record, & noteworthy events ===
The Cardinals began September with two unlikely wins on the road against the Los Angeles Dodgers where the team's offensive scored a combined 21 runs across the two game. The second win brought the team back to a .500 record, however, fitting with a theme a struggling to secure a three game series sweep when possible during this year, the Cards dropped the third game of the series. After that, the club switched off between winning & losing as they completed a series win on the road against the Colorado Rockies, again pulling back to .500, but running out of time to secure a playoff spot.

==== Incident with Umpire on September 4th - The Doug Eddings Game ====
Noteworthy during the Colorado series was an incident that occurred between several team members and MLB umpire Doug Eddings during the September 4th game that made national sports news. Umpire Eddings emphatically announced the result of a failed challenge by the Cardinals on a play at third base, then a short time later proceeded to tell rookie pitcher Hancel Rincon during his Major League debut to adjust his hat, which Rincon was wearing titled to his left-hand side at the time. Manager Marmol subsequently confronted Eddings once Justin Bruihl was warming up as the next pitcher for the Cardinals, to whom Eddings assessed a pitch clock violation. Later in the game, with the Cardinals out of challenges, Eddings called a running safe during a play at the plate that he was both extremely close to and had a clear line of sight on where the batter was touched by the catcher's glove with the ball inside it before the batted touched the plate, prompting concerns of inappropriate behavior by Eddings. It took a three run home run by Ivan Herrera in the ninth inning for the Cardinals to win the game & avoid what could have been an even more extended timeframe on the controversy.

A day later during the second game of the three game series, Rincon's teammates and players on the Rockies titled their caps in show of solidarity with the pitcher. More information and quotes by those involved in the September 4 incident became readily available the day afterwards as well. Press reports the following day relayed that Eddings was quoted after the September 4th game by saying, "“The batter said, ‘Hey, can he wear his hat like that?’” Eddings recounted after the game. “I really didn't know, but it was really, really crooked. I asked the catcher to tell him to straighten his hat out, and the pitcher did. Nobody said anything until he gave up a couple runs.” The batter mentioned by Eddings in his quote, Hunter Goodman, subsequently refuted Eddings by saying, "“I never once mentioned the hat...It doesn’t matter who’s pitching. I don’t care how they wear the hat. I’m trying to find out where the ball is coming out, and I’m trying to worry about what I’m doing in the box. I’m not worried about how his hat looks. After a few days had passed, some media & Cardinals fans began referring to the incident as "The Doug Eddings Game".

After winning the series against Colorado, the Cardinals traveled to San Francisco, California and subsequently were swept in their next series against the Giants.

==== Hall of Fame Induction Day - September 12th ====
After winning the first game of their series against the Chicago White Sox, the team's attention then turned towards the organization's annual Hall of Fame induction ceremony, where Yadier Molina, Albert Pujols, & Bill Sherdel were inducted during pre-game ceremonies on Saturday, September 12th, 2026. After initial ceremonies including a sing-a-long of "Take Me Out to the Ballgame" by those in attendance to a video of Stan Musial playing the song on his harmonica, Bill Sherdel's grandson, John Sherdel, was presented with his grandfather's Cardinals Hall of Fame plaque, and spoke to the crowd in recognition of his grandfather's honor. Sherdel told the assembly that his grandfather was a man of few words, but that his grandfather essentially inspired their family with living proving that achieving your dreams is possible, & Sherdel noted that five generations of his family lived or are currently living in the house his grandfather built. Sherdel finished his speech by relaying a quote from his grandfather from a 1950s edition of the Sporting News where Bill Sherdel said that pitching for the Cardinals was one of the best times of his life.

Yadier Molina was presented with his Cardinals Hall of Fame red jacket and Hall of Fame plaque. During his speech the emotional Molina thanked important people in his life and the Cardinals organization for their role in helping him achieve success. Molina then enlisted the help of Cardinals lead Spanish language broadcaster Polo Ascencio to provide an English translation to the crowd of messages Molina said directly to his late father, his mother in attendance at the event, other family members, & the people of Puerto Rico.

Albert Pujols capped the ceremonies with a speech after receiving his own red jacket & Cardinals Hall of Fame plaque. Pujols thanked multiple members of the organization during his speech, and similar to Molina, included a nod to the people of his home country of the Dominican Republic.

The day did not have a storybook ending though, as the team suffered a blown save in the ninth inning against the White Sox, fighting for their one playoffs lives in both their division and the Wild Card race, leading to a 6-5 loss for the Cards.

==== Outcomes During Last Two Weeks of the Season ====
After winning the series against the White Sox the next day, the Cardinals failed to win another series for the remainder of the season. The Cardinals lost consecutive series at home to the Giants, Pirates, and then Nationals by two games to one in each series. The team then went on the road & lost a three game series to Pittsburgh two games to one, before being swept on the road by Milwaukee to close out the season and go 2-8 in their final ten games. At season's end, the Cardinals had amassed a 77-85 record, finishing fourth in the N.L. Central. In a year focused on giving new players & younger players opportunities, the Cardinals had thirteen players make their Major League debut during the course of the season. Bright spots remained though, with Burleson ending the regular season as the Major League RBI leader with 116 RBI, becoming the first Cardinal to do so (or be tied for the RBI lead at season's end) since Joe Torre in 1971. Another bright spot was Leo Bernal homering in the final game of the year to help fuel hope of better days ahead for the team.

== Events After the End of the Regular Season ==
=== After-season Awards ===
After the team's regular season ended, the 2026 Rawlings Gold Gove Award finalists were publicly announced on October 14, with Masyn Winn an finalist in the N.L. at shortstop, Michael McGreevy a finalist as a pitcher, & Wetherholt a finalist as second base. When the winners were announced on November 1st, none of the three aforementioned finalists came away with an award. Wetherholt was then announced as a finalist for the National League Rookie of the Year a day later on November 2nd, ultimately seeing the award go to Cincinnati Reds rookie Sal Stewart. Upon announcement of the N.L. Silver Slugger finalists, Burleson was named one of the finalists at first base, and Walker was one of seven finalist for the award as an outfielder.

=== Offseason Roster, Coaching, & Front Office Moves ===
The Cardinals declined Ryan Stanek's club option on November 1, then made a trade with the Red Sox for left handed pitcher Eduardo Rivera. On the coaching staff front, the team relived hitting coach Brant Brown of his role on October 23, replacing him with Joel McKeithan, who was the previously the White Sox's assistant hitting coach. Inside the team's front office, assistant General Manger Rob Cerfolio was promoted to General Manager on November 6, serving under P.O.B.O. Chaim Bloom.

== Season standings ==
=== National League Central ===
NL Central
Team	W	L	Pct.	GB	Home	Road
Milwaukee Brewers	103	59	.636	—	55‍–‍26	48‍–‍33
Chicago Cubs	89	73	.549	14	46‍–‍35	43‍–‍38
Pittsburgh Pirates	82	80	.506	21	44‍–‍37	38‍–‍43
St. Louis Cardinals	77	85	.475	26	38‍–‍43	39‍–‍42
Cincinnati Reds	75	87	.463	28	38‍–‍43	37‍–‍44

=== National League Wild Card ===
Division leaders
Team	W	L	Pct.
Milwaukee Brewers	103	59	.636
Los Angeles Dodgers	100	62	.617
Atlanta Braves	94	68	.580

Wild Card teams (Top 3 teams qualify for postseason)
Team	W	L	Pct.	GB
San Diego Padres	91	71	.562	+3
Chicago Cubs	89	73	.549	+1
Philadelphia Phillies	88	74	.543	—
Arizona Diamondbacks	86	76	.531	2
Pittsburgh Pirates	82	80	.506	6
Miami Marlins	80	82	.494	8
St. Louis Cardinals	77	85	.475	11
Washington Nationals	77	85	.475	11
Cincinnati Reds	75	87	.463	13
New York Mets	74	88	.457	14
San Francisco Giants	65	97	.401	23
Colorado Rockies	58	104	.358	30

=== Record vs. opponents ===
==== Record vs. National League ====
2026 National League record Source: MLB Standings Grid – 2026
Team	AZ	ATL	CHC	CIN	COL	LAD	MIA	MIL	NYM	PHI	PIT	SD	SF	STL	WSH	AL
Arizona	—	4–3	2–4	4–2	9–4	7–6	1–5	2–4	4–2	3–3	3–3	6–7	10–3	5–2	2–4	24–24
Atlanta	3–4	—	3–3	3–3	6–0	5–1	9–4	3–3	6–7	9–4	5–1	3–4	1–5	2–4	9–4	27–21
Chicago	4–2	3–3	—	9–4	3–3	4–2	3–3	4–9	7–0	6–1	7–6	5–1	3–3	6–7	3–3	22–26
Cincinnati	2–4	3–3	4–9	—	4–2	1–6	3–4	4–9	4–2	3–3	6–7	3–3	3–3	5–8	1–5	29–19
Colorado	4–9	0–6	3–3	2–4	—	3–10	2–5	1–5	4–2	2–4	3–3	2–11	7–6	2–4	3–4	20–28
Los Angeles	6–7	1–5	2–4	6–1	10–3	—	2–4	3–4	5–1	4–2	5–1	8–5	9–4	2–4	6–0	31–17
Miami	5–1	4–9	3–3	4–3	5–2	4–2	—	1–5	6–7	5–8	4–2	0–6	4–2	4–2	9–4	22–26
Milwaukee	4–2	3–3	9–4	9–4	5–1	4–3	5–1	—	4–2	4–2	6–7	2–4	3–4	11–2	2–4	32–16
New York	2–4	7–6	0–7	2–4	2–4	1–5	7–6	2–4	—	6–7	4–2	4–2	5–2	2–4	7–6	23–25
Philadelphia	3–3	4–9	1–6	3–3	4–2	2–4	8–5	2–4	7–6	—	5–2	6–0	4–2	4–2	9–4	26–22
Pittsburgh	3–3	1–5	6–7	7–6	3–3	1–5	2–4	7–6	2–4	2–5	—	3–3	3–3	6–7	4–3	32–16
San Diego	7–6	4–3	1–5	3–3	11–2	5–8	6–0	4–2	2–4	0–6	3–3	—	9–4	3–4	4–2	29–19
San Francisco	3–10	5–1	3–3	3–3	6–7	4–9	2–4	4–3	2–5	2–4	3–3	4–9	—	5–1	3–3	16–32
St. Louis	2–5	4–2	7–6	8–5	4–2	4–2	2–4	2–11	4–2	2–4	7–6	4–3	1–5	—	3–3	23–25
Washington	4–2	4–9	3–3	5–1	4–3	0–6	4–9	4–2	6–7	4–9	3–4	2–4	3–3	3–3	—	28–20

Updated with the results of all games through September 27, 2026.

==== Record vs. American League ====
2026 National League record vs. American League Source: MLB Standings
Team	ATH	BAL	BOS	CWS	CLE	DET	HOU	KC	LAA	MIN	NYY	SEA	TB	TEX	TOR
Arizona	2–1	2–1	1–2	1–2	2–1	3–0	2–1	2–1	2–1	1–2	2–1	0–3	0–3	2–4	2–1
Atlanta	2–1	2–1	4–2	1–2	2–1	2–1	3–0	2–1	2–1	0–3	1–2	1–2	1–2	2–1	2–1
Chicago	1–2	2–1	1–2	3–3	1–2	1–2	0–3	2–1	2–1	2–1	1–2	1–2	2–1	1–2	2–1
Cincinnati	3–0	1–2	2–1	2–1	2–4	2–1	2–1	1–2	1–2	3–0	2–1	2–1	2–1	3–0	1–2
Colorado	1–2	2–1	2–1	1–2	0–3	0–3	4–2	3–0	2–1	1–2	0–3	1–2	0–3	1–2	2–1
Los Angeles	2–1	1–2	0–3	1–2	1–2	2–1	2–1	3–0	5–1	3–0	2–1	2–1	3–0	2–1	2–1
Miami	3–0	1–2	1–2	2–1	0–3	0–3	0–3	2–1	2–1	1–2	1–2	3–0	3–3	2–1	1–2
Milwaukee	1–2	3–0	1–2	3–0	2–1	1–2	2–1	2–1	2–1	4–2	3–0	2–1	2–1	2–1	2–1
New York	0–3	0–3	0–3	1–2	3–0	3–0	1–2	2–1	2–1	2–1	3–3	1–2	2–1	2–1	1–2
Philadelphia	2–1	2–1	2–1	2–1	1–2	2–1	1–2	1–2	3–0	3–0	1–2	1–2	1–2	1–2	3–3
Pittsburgh	2–1	3–0	2–1	3–0	2–1	3–3	2–1	3–0	2–1	3–0	1–2	2–1	2–1	1–2	1–2
San Diego	2–1	2–1	2–1	1–2	2–1	1–2	2–1	1–2	2–1	3–0	2–1	6–0	0–3	1–2	2–1
San Francisco	4–2	1–2	0–3	2–1	1–2	1–2	1–2	0–3	2–1	1–2	0–3	1–2	0–3	1–2	1–2
St. Louis	2–1	1–2	1–2	2–1	2–1	1–2	3–0	3–3	1–2	1–2	2–1	0–3	2–1	1–2	1–2
Washington	2–1	4–2	2–1	2–1	2–1	2–1	2–1	2–1	3–0	2–1	0–3	2–1	1–2	1–2	1–2

Updated with the results of all games through September 27, 2026.

== Game log ==
The Cardinals released their 2026 schedule on August 26, 2025. For one of the few times in the past dozen years, the Cardinals opened the regular season at home for 2026, hosting the Tampa Bay Rays on Opening Day, March 26, at Busch Stadium, in its 21st season. Their first National League series was on March 30–April 1 against the New York Mets. The season will end with a September 25–27 weekend road series at the Milwaukee Brewers.

Legend
Cardinals Win	Cardinals Loss	Game postponed	Eliminated from playoff race
Boldface text denotes a Cardinals pitcher

2026 St. Louis Cardinals Game Log: 77–85 (Home: 38–43; Away: 39–42)
March/April: 18–13 (Home: 7–8; Road: 11–5)

#	Date	Opponent	Score	Win	Loss	Save	Attendance	Record	Box / Streak
1	March 26	Rays	9–7	**O'Brien** (1–0)	Cleavinger (0–1)	**Stanek** (1)	45,037	1–0	W1
2	March 28	Rays	6–5 (10)	**Stanek** (1–0)	Jax (0–1)	—	25,951	2–0	W2
3	March 29	Rays	7–11	Matz (1–0)	**May** (0–1)	—	27,653	2–1	L1
4	March 30	Mets	2–4	Holmes (1–0)	**Leahy** (0–1)	Williams (1)	21,307	2–2	L2
5	March 31	Mets	3–0	**Pallante** (1–0)	Senga (0–1)	**O'Brien** (1)	22,823	3–2	W1
6	April 1	Mets	2–1 (11)	**Graceffo** (1–0)	Myers (0–1)	—	21,684	4–2	W2
7	April 3	@ Tigers	0–4	Valdez (1–0)	**McGreevy** (0–1)	—	45,008	4–3	L1
8	April 4	@ Tigers	6–11 (8)	Hurter (1–0)	**May** (0–2)	—	28,708	4–4	L2
9	April 5	@ Tigers	5–3	**Leahy** (1–1)	Montero (0–1)	**O'Brien** (2)	28,823	5–4	W1
10	April 6	@ Nationals	6–9	Pérez (1–1)	**Svanson** (0–1)	—	12,319	5–5	L1
11	April 7	@ Nationals	7–6 (10)	**Soriano** (1–0)	Henry (0–2)	**O'Brien** (3)	20,036	6–5	W1
12	April 8	@ Nationals	6–1	**McGreevy** (1–1)	Mikolas (0–3)	—	12,686	7–5	W2
13	April 10	Red Sox	3–2	**May** (1–2)	Kelly (0–1)	**O'Brien** (4)	27,125	8–5	W3
14	April 11	Red Sox	1–7	Suárez (1–1)	**Leahy** (1–2)	—	31,664	8–6	L1
15	April 12	Red Sox	3–9	Bello (1–1)	**Pallante** (1–1)	—	25,122	8–7	L2
16	April 13	Guardians	3–9	Williams (2–1)	**Liberatore** (0–1)	—	17,901	8–8	L3
17	April 14	Guardians	6–5 (10)	**O'Brien** (2–0)	Herrin (0–1)	—	20,772	9–8	W1
18	April 15	Guardians	5–3	**May** (2–2)	Brogdon (2–2)	**O'Brien** (5)	22,642	10–8	W2
19	April 17	@ Astros	9–4	**Leahy** (2–2)	Lambert (0–1)	—	33,086	11–8	W3
20	April 18	@ Astros	7–5	**Pallante** (2–1)	McCullers Jr. (1–1)	**O'Brien** (6)	33,319	12–8	W4
21	April 19	@ Astros	7–5 (10)	**O'Brien** (3–0)	King (0–1)	**Graceffo** (1)	33,491	13–8	W5
22	April 20	@ Marlins	3–5	Faucher (2–2)	**McGreevy** (1–2)	Fairbanks (4)	8,285	13–9	L1
23	April 21	@ Marlins	5–3	**May** (3–2)	Paddack (0–4)	**O'Brien** (7)	8,412	14–9	W1
24	April 22	@ Marlins	1–4	Junk (1–2)	**Leahy** (2–3)	Fairbanks (5)	7,593	14–10	L1
25	April 24	Mariners	2–3	Kirby (3–2)	**Pallante** (2–2)	Muñoz (4)	31,304	14–11	L2
26	April 25	Mariners	9–11	Brash (2–0)	**O'Brien** (3–1)	Muñoz (5)	27,236	14–12	L3
27	April 26	Mariners	2–3	Bazardo (1–1)	**Romero** (0–1)	Ferrer (1)	30,780	14–13	L4
28	April 27	@ Pirates	4–2	**Fernandez** (1–0)	Santana (2–2)	**Soriano** (1)	9,787	15–13	W1
29	April 28	@ Pirates	11–7	**Leahy** (3–3)	Ashcraft (1–2)	—	8,758	16–13	W2
30	April 29	@ Pirates	5–4	**Pallante** (3–2)	Chandler (1–3)	**O'Brien** (8)	9,297	17–13	W3
31	April 30	@ Pirates	10–5	**Graceffo** (2–0)	Skenes (4–2)	—	12,143	18–13	W4

May: 13–13 (Home: 8–6; Road: 5–7)

#	Date	Opponent	Score	Win	Loss	Save	Attendance	Record	Box / Streak
32	May 1	Dodgers	7–2	**Liberatore** (1–1)	Sheehan (2–1)	—	28,308	19–13	W5
33	May 2	Dodgers	3–2	**McGreevy** (2–2)	Sasaki (1–3)	**O'Brien** (9)	34,323	20–13	W6
34	May 3	Dodgers	1–4	Wrobleski (5–0)	**May** (3–3)	Scott (2)	36,423	20–14	L1
35	May 4	Brewers	6–3	**Leahy** (4–3)	Patrick (2–2)	**O'Brien** (10)	22,080	21–14	W1
―	May 5	Brewers	**Postponed (rain)** (Makeup date: July 7)						
36	May 6	Brewers	2–6	Ashby (6–0)	**Pallante** (3–3)	—	25,772	21–15	L1
37	May 7	@ Padres	2–1	**Liberatore** (2–1)	Rodríguez (0–2)	**O'Brien** (11)	44,966	22–15	W1
38	May 8	@ Padres	6–0	**McGreevy** (3–2)	Canning (0–1)	—	40,442	23–15	W2
39	May 9	@ Padres	2–4	Vásquez (4–1)	**May** (3–4)	Miller (12)	41,559	23–16	L1
40	May 10	@ Padres	2–3 (10)	Morejón (3–1)	**Graceffo** (2–1)	—	39,795	23–17	L2
41	May 12	@ Athletics	6–4	**Pallante** (4–3)	Springs (3–3)	**O'Brien** (12)	11,132	24–17	W1
42	May 13	@ Athletics	2–6	Ginn (2–1)	**Liberatore** (2–2)	—	10,182	24–18	L1
43	May 14	@ Athletics	5–4	**Svanson** (1–1)	Perkins (2–2)	**O'Brien** (13)	8,975	25–18	W1
44	May 15	Royals	5–4 (11)	**Graceffo** (3–1)	Cruz (0–1)	—	26,949	26–18	W2
45	May 16	Royals	4–2	**Leahy** (5–3)	Cameron (2–3)	**Soriano** (2)	32,379	27–18	W3
46	May 17	Royals	0–2	Kolek (2–0)	**Pallante** (4–4)	Erceg (11)	38,051	27–19	L1
47	May 19	Pirates	9–6 (10)	**Soriano** (2–0)	Montgomery (1–1)	—	22,958	28–19	W1
48	May 20	Pirates	0–7	Mlodzinski (4–3)	**McGreevy** (3–3)	—	27,185	28–20	L1
49	May 21	Pirates	2–6	Ashcraft (3–2)	**May** (3–5)	—	27,705	28–21	L2
―	May 22	@ Reds	**Postponed (rain)** (Makeup date: May 23)						
50	May 23 (1)	@ Reds	8–1	**Pallante** (5–4)	Paddack (0–6)	—	19,927	29–21	W1
51	May 23 (2)	@ Reds	6–7 (11)	Johnson (2–1)	**O'Brien** (3–2)	—	31,144	29–22	L1
―	May 24	@ Reds	**Postponed (rain)** (Makeup date: August 17)						
52	May 25	@ Brewers	1–5	Misiorowski (5–2)	**Liberatore** (2–3)	—	35,695	29–23	L1
53	May 26	@ Brewers	0–6	Harrison (6–1)	**McGreevy** (3–4)	—	33,532	29–24	L2
54	May 27	@ Brewers	1–2	Ashby (9–0)	**May** (3–6)	Megill (6)	30,391	29–25	L3
55	May 29	Cubs	6–5	**Graceffo** (4–1)	Imanaga (4–6)	**O'Brien** (14)	37,564	30–25	W1
56	May 30	Cubs	1–6	Brown (2–2)	**Fernandez** (1–1)	—	40,147	30–26	L1
57	May 31	Cubs	5–1	**Liberatore** (3–3)	Wicks (0–2)	**Dobbins** (1)	34,753	31–26	W1

June: 13–12 (Home: 8–7; Road: 5–5)

#	Date	Opponent	Score	Win	Loss	Save	Attendance	Record	Box / Streak
58	June 1	Rangers	1–2	deGrom (4–4)	**McGreevy** (3–5)	Latz (8)	21,770	31–27	L1
59	June 2	Rangers	4–7	Quantrill (3–0)	**O'Brien** (3–3)	Junis (4)	24,859	31–28	L2
60	June 3	Rangers	5–3	**Pallante** (6–4)	Gore (4–5)	**O'Brien** (15)	21,400	32–28	W1
61	June 5	Reds	10–3	**Dobbins** (1–0)	Singer (2–6)	—	30,058	33–28	W2
62	June 6	Reds	6–5	**Soriano** (3–0)	Moll (1–4)	**O'Brien** (16)	26,904	34–28	W3
63	June 7	Reds	5–3	**Stanek** (2–0)	Moll (1–5)	**O'Brien** (17)	31,335	35–28	W4
64	June 9	@ Mets	7–0	**May** (4–6)	Peralta (4–5)	—	35,175	36–28	W5
65	June 10	@ Mets	9–2	**Pallante** (7–4)	Warren (1–3)	—	34,238	37–28	W6
66	June 11	@ Mets	4–5	Raley (2–1)	**Romero** (0–2)	Williams (9)	37,019	37–29	L1
67	June 12	@ Twins	8–9	Banda (2–0)	**Stanek** (2–1)	Morris (2)	23,089	37–30	L2
68	June 13	@ Twins	9–6	**Svanson** (2–1)	Lawrence (0–3)	—	23,408	38–30	W1
69	June 14	@ Twins	4–5	Morris (2–2)	**Soriano** (3–1)	Gómez (6)	23,026	38–31	L1
70	June 15	Padres	3–0	**May** (5–6)	Giolito (2–2)	—	26,973	39–31	W1
71	June 16	Padres	3–2	**Pallante** (8–4)	King (4–6)	**O'Brien** (18)	29,604	40–31	W2
72	June 17	Padres	1–6	Canning (1–5)	**Leahy** (5–4)	—	29,859	40–32	L1
73	June 18	@ Royals	6–14	Cameron (4–4)	**Liberatore** (3–4)	—	18,363	40–33	L2
74	June 19	@ Royals	5–6	Lugo (3–4)	**McGreevy** (3–6)	Lange (5)	27,323	40–34	L3
75	June 21	@ Royals	12–10	**Graceffo** (5–1)	Kolek (4–2)	—	28,309	41–34	W1
76	June 22	Diamondbacks	3–2	**Pallante** (9–4)	Kelly (5–7)	**O'Brien** (19)	22,050	42–34	W2
77	June 23	Diamondbacks	3–4	Ginkel (3–2)	**Svanson** (2–2)	Garcia (1)	23,560	42–35	L1
78	June 24	Diamondbacks	4–9	Thompson (3–1)	**Liberatore** (3–5)	―	22,376	42–36	L2
―	June 25	Diamondbacks	**Postponed (rain)** (Makeup date: July 23)						
79	June 26	Marlins	0–4	Meyer (9–0)	**Soriano** (3–2)	—	27,584	42–37	L3
80	June 27	Marlins	1–5	King (6–1)	**Pallante** (9–5)	—	25,876	42–38	L4
81	June 28	Marlins	2–1	**Leahy** (6–4)	Phillips (1–3)	**O'Brien** (20)	37,779	43–38	W1
82	June 30	@ Braves	5–3	**Liberatore** (4–5)	Pérez (6–5)	**O'Brien** (21)	32,932	44–38	W2

July: 10–18 (Home: 5–11; Road: 5–7)

#	Date	Opponent	Score	Win	Loss	Save	Attendance	Record	Box / Streak
83	July 1	@ Braves	1–5	López (4–1)	**McGreevy** (3–7)	—	27,361	44–39	L1
84	July 2	@ Braves	11–5	**Graceffo** (6–1)	Kinley (4–3)	—	34,524	45–39	W1
85	July 3	@ Cubs	17–1	**Pallante** (10–5)	Peterson (4–7)	—	39,440	46–39	W2
86	July 4	@ Cubs	3–0	**Leahy** (7–4)	Imanaga (5–7)	**O'Brien** (22)	38,872	47–39	W3
87	July 5	@ Cubs	4–6	Pomeranz (1–3)	**Liberatore** (4–6)	Webb (3)	38,322	47–40	L1
88	July 6	Brewers	3–4	Drohan (4–2)	**Fernandez** (1–2)	Megill (14)	21,786	47–41	L2
89	July 7 (1)	Brewers	3–4	Misiorowski (10–4)	**Stanek** (2–2)	Uribe (6)	24,430	47–42	L3
90	July 7 (2)	Brewers	2–10	Gasser (2–3)	**Dobbins** (0–1)	—	20,399	47–43	L4
91	July 8	Brewers	5–1	**McGreevy** (4–7)	Harrison (8–2)	—	20,395	48–43	W1
92	July 9	Brewers	4–8	Henderson (3–1)	**Pallante** (10–6)	—	27,028	48–44	L1
93	July 10	Braves	2–1	**Romero** (1–2)	Young (0–1)	**O'Brien** (23)	26,609	49–44	W1
94	July 11	Braves	4–1	**Liberatore** (5–6)	López (4–2)	**O'Brien** (24)	29,122	50–44	W2
95	July 12	Braves	3–4	Kinley (5–3)	**Romero** (1–3)	Iglesias (19)	30,234	50–45	L1
July 14 **96th All-Star Game in Philadelphia, Pennsylvania**
96	July 17	@ Diamondbacks	5–4	**Gastélum** (1–0)	Sewald (2–5)	**O'Brien** (25)	29,931	51–45	W1
97	July 18	@ Diamondbacks	3–5	Pfaadt (4–1)	**May** (5–7)	Sewald (23)	38,244	51–46	L1
98	July 19	@ Diamondbacks	7–8 (10)	Morillo (3–4)	**Gastélum** (1–1)	—	28,069	51–47	L2
99	July 20	@ Angels	2–3	Fermín (3–1)	**O'Brien** (3–4)	—	29,794	51–48	L3
100	July 21	@ Angels	1–5	Ureña (6–7)	**Liberatore** (5–7)	—	33,151	51–49	L4
101	July 22	@ Angels	1–0	**Dobbins** (2–1)	Detmers (3–7)	**O'Brien** (26)	25,187	52–49	W1
102	July 23	Diamondbacks	6–10	Pfaadt (5–1)	**McGreevy** (4–8)	—	32,381	52–50	L1
103	July 24	Reds	2–4	Garcia (1–2)	**Soriano** (3–3)	Pagán (10)	29,900	52–51	L2
104	July 25	Reds	7–0	**Pallante** (11–6)	Greene (2–2)	—	33,975	53–51	W1
105	July 26	Reds	3–5 (10)	Burke (4–4)	**Svanson** (2–3)	Garcia (1)	22,852	53–52	L1
106	July 27	Cubs	3–7	Peterson (6–7)	**Liberatore** (5–8)	—	24,209	53–53	L2
107	July 28	Cubs	2–10	Rea (8–7)	**McGreevy** (4–9)	—	29,097	53–54	L3
108	July 29	Cubs	3–2 (10)	**Gastélum** (2–1)	Thornton (3–4)	—	31,499	54–54	W1
109	July 30	Cubs	2–4 (10)	Webb (4–2)	**Gastélum** (2–2)	Civale (1)	29,475	54–55	L1
110	July 31	@ Blue Jays	1–3	Hoffman (6–7)	**Strzelecki** (0–1)	Varland (24)	41,506	54–56	L2

August: 14–14 (Home: 6–6; Road: 8–8)

#	Date	Opponent	Score	Win	Loss	Save	Attendance	Record	Box / Streak
111	August 1	@ Blue Jays	1–5	Gausman (5–10)	**Mathews** (0–1)	—	41,819	54–57	L3
112	August 2	@ Blue Jays	5–1	**Soriano** (4–3)	Varland (3–4)	—	41,321	55–57	W1
113	August 3	@ Yankees	13–7	**Graceffo** (7–1)	Chivilli (1–1)	—	38,151	56–57	W2
114	August 4	@ Yankees	0–2	Weathers (5–7)	**Dobbins** (2–2)	Bednar (25)	41,081	56–58	L1
115	August 5	@ Yankees	3–1	**Pallante** (12–6)	Warren (8–6)	**O'Brien** (27)	37,425	57–58	W1
116	August 7	Rockies	3–2	**Leahy** (8–4)	Feltner (4–6)	**O'Brien** (28)	26,481	58–58	W2
117	August 8	Rockies	6–8	Mushinski (1–0)	**Liberatore** (5–9)	Romano (10)	29,204	58–59	L1
118	August 9	Rockies	7–4	**Soriano** (5–3)	Gordon (0–3)	**O'Brien** (29)	25,589	59–59	W1
119	August 10	Phillies	5–6	Painter (2–8)	**Dobbins** (2–3)	Bowlan (1)	26,903	59–60	L1
120	August 11	Phillies	2–0	**Soriano** (6–3)	McFarlane (0–1)	**O'Brien** (30)	27,222	60–60	W1
121	August 12	Phillies	7–1	**Leahy** (9–4)	Wheeler (10–4)	—	22,565	61–60	W2
122	August 14	@ Cubs	0–3	Holmes (5–5)	**Liberatore** (5–10)	Webb (9)	40,374	61–61	L1
123	August 15	@ Cubs	8–4	**McGreevy** (5–9)	Boyd (8–2)	—	39,834	62–61	W1
124	August 16	@ Cubs	11–4	**Dobbins** (3–3)	Cabera (5–5)	—	39,395	63–61	W2
125	August 17 (1)	@ Reds	2–1	**Gastélum** (3–2)	Emanuel (0–1)	**O'Brien** (31)	20,434	64–61	W3
126	August 17 (2)	@ Reds	5–6 (10)	Pagán (5–1)	**Bruihl** (0–1)	—	12,166	64–62	L1
127	August 18	@ Reds	3–0	**Leahy** (10–4)	Abbott (6–8)	**O'Brien** (32)	21,757	65–62	W1
128	August 19	@ Reds	4–5	Moll (2–7)	**Liberatore** (5–11)	Pagán (16)	16,097	65–63	L1
129	August 20	@ Reds	10–9	**Strzelecki** (1–1)	Burke (5–5)	**O'Brien** (33)	15,361	66–63	W1
130	August 21	@ Phillies	6–7 (10)	McFarlane (2–1)	**Gastélum** (3–3)	—	44,802	66–64	L1
131	August 22	@ Phillies	3–12	Painter (3–8)	**Mathews** (0–2)	—	42,218	66–65	L2
132	August 23	@ Phillies	4–6	McFarlane (3–1)	**O'Brien** (3–5)	—	42,610	66–66	L3
133	August 25	Orioles	1–13	Bassitt (5–4)	**Liberatore** (5–12)	—	26,877	66–67	L4
134	August 26	Orioles	7–8	Wolfram (5–2)	**O'Brien** (3–6)	Kittredge (7)	21,185	66–68	L5
135	August 27	Orioles	7–5	**Gastélum** (4–3)	Rogers (9–9)	**O'Brien** (34)	20,723	67–68	W1
136	August 28	Pirates	4–1	**Mathews** (1–2)	Jones (2–6)	**Stanek** (2)	22,964	68–68	W2
137	August 29	Pirates	2–6	Mlodzinski (7–6)	**Mautz** (0–1)	—	26,265	68–69	L1
138	August 30	Pirates	4–5	Ashcraft (14–5)	**Liberatore** (5–13)	Montgomery (7)	23,459	68–70	L2

September: 9–15 (Home: 4–5; Road: 5–10)

#	Date	Opponent	Score	Win	Loss	Save	Attendance	Record	Box / Streak
139	September 1	@ Dodgers	13–8	**McGreevy** (6–9)	Lauer (8–7)	—	44,593	69–70	W1
140	September 2	@ Dodgers	8–6 (10)	**Bruihl** (1–1)	Stewart (0–2)	**O'Brien** (35)	45,900	70–70	W2
141	September 3	@ Dodgers	2–3	Stewart (1–2)	**O'Brien** (3–7)	—	45,150	70–71	L1
142	September 4	@ Rockies	7–6	**Winquest** (1–0)	Romano (0–3)	**O'Brien** (36)	28,580	71–71	W1
143	September 5	@ Rockies	7–10	Bernardino (4–3)	**Liberatore** (5–14)	Romano (15)	39,768	71–72	L1
144	September 6	@ Rockies	10–8	**Hjerpe** (1–0)	Herget (0–6)	**Soriano** (3)	30,819	72–72	W1
145	September 7	@ Giants	4–5 (11)	Foley (3–1)	**Soriano** (6–4)	—	25,833	72–73	L1
146	September 8	@ Giants	1–2	Roupp (9–13)	**Mathews** (1–3)	Kuhnel (7)	27,787	72–74	L2
147	September 9	@ Giants	6–7	Wilkinson (1–3)	**Soriano** (6–5)	Harris (1)	27,487	72–75	L3
148	September 11	White Sox	7–3	**Graceffo** (8–1)	Kay (9–9)	—	30,274	73–75	W1
149	September 12	White Sox	5–6	Hicks (3–2)	**O'Brien** (3–8)	Hudson (8)	40,387	73–76	L1
150	September 13	White Sox	3–1	**McGreevy** (7–9)	Sandlin (2–2)	**Soriano** (4)	34,609	74–76	W1
151	September 14	Giants	2–1	**Mathews** (2–3)	Roupp (9–14)	**O'Brien** (37)	25,150	75–76	W2
152	September 15	Giants	3–10	Tidwell (1–2)	**Pallante** (12–7)	—	26,666	75–77	L1
153	September 16	Giants	5–6 (10)	Sanmartin (3–0)	**O'Brien** (3–9)	Kuhnel (8)	24,960	75–78	L2
154	September 18	Nationals	1–9	Cavalli (13–5)	**Leahy** (10–5)	—	25,855	75–79	L3
155	September 19	Nationals	5–8 (11)	Cornelio (3–2)	**Graceffo** (8–2)	Dion (1)	29,774	75–80	L4
156	September 20	Nationals	5–3	**Gastélum** (5–3)	Cruz (0–2)	**O'Brien** (38)	27,814	76–80	W1
157	September 22	@ Pirates	0–2	Jones (5–6)	**Pallante** (12–8)	Soto (16)	11,375	76–81	L1
158	September 23	@ Pirates	5–1	**Liberatore** (6–14)	Eisert (3–3)	—	13,176	77–81	W1
159	September 24	@ Pirates	1–2	Weaver (4–1)	**Stanek** (2–3)	Montgomery (17)	15,822	77–82	L1
160	September 25	@ Brewers	4–8	Uribe (6–3)	**Gastélum** (5–4)	—	42,793	77–83	L2
161	September 26	@ Brewers	2–3	Harrison (11–5)	**Mathews** (2–4)	Ashby (4)	42,900	77–84	L3
162	September 27	@ Brewers	4–6	Misiorowski (16–5)	**Pallante** (12–9)	Drohan (2)	43,556	77–85	L4

== Roster ==
2026 St. Louis Cardinals
Roster
Pitchers: 66 Scott Blewett; 47 Justin Bruihl; 40 Hunter Dobbins; 54 Caleb Ferguson; 64 Ryan Fernandez; 72 Luis Gastélum; 44 Gordon Graceffo; 56 Cooper Hjerpe; 62 Kyle Leahy; 32 Matthew Liberatore; 60 Quinn Mathews; 52 Brycen Mautz; 3 Dustin May; 36 Michael McGreevy; 61 Riley O'Brien; 53 Andre Pallante; 67 Matt Pushard; 71 Max Rajcic; 66 Hancel Rincon; 59 JoJo Romero; 58 Chris Roycroft; 68 Jared Shuster; 65 George Soriano; 55 Ryne Stanek; 58 Peter Strzelecki; 49 Matt Svanson; 63 Cade Winquest; 54 Bruce Zimmermann	Catchers: 13 Leo Bernal; 8 Jimmy Crooks; 48 Iván Herrera; 43 Pedro Pagés; 63 Yohel Pozo; Infielders: 41 Alec Burleson; 16 Nolan Gorman; 33 Blaze Jordan; 31 César Prieto; 25 Thomas Saggese; 29 Ramón Urías; 26 JJ Wetherholt; 0 Masyn Winn	Outfielders: 22 Joshua Báez; 27 Nathan Church; 15 José Fermín; 21 Lars Nootbaar; 21 Everson Pereira; 11 Victor Scott II; 39 Bryan Torres; 38 Nelson Velázquez; 18 Jordan Walker	Manager: 37 Oliver Marmol; Coaches: 87 Brandon Allen (assistant hitting); 90 Dusty Blake (pitching); 73 Brant Brown (hitting); 88 Casey Chenoweth (assistant hitting); 82 Stubby Clapp (first base); 34 Daniel Descalso (bench); 86 Kyle Driscoll (assistant pitching); 19 Jon Jay (outfield/baserunning/quality control); 94 Jamie Pogue (assistant/bullpen); 74 Julio Rangel (assistant pitching/bullpen); 76 Kleininger Teran (bullpen catcher); 75 Ron 'Pop' Warner (third base)

== Player stats ==
= Indicates team leader

= Indicates league leader

=== Batting ===
Note: G = Games played; AB = At bats; R = Runs scored; H = Hits; 2B = Doubles; 3B = Triples; HR = Home runs; RBI = Runs batted in; SB = Stolen bases; BB = Walks; AVG = Batting average; SLG = Slugging average

Player	G	AB	R	H	2B	3B	HR	RBI	SB	BB	AVG	SLG
Jordan Walker	158	609	97	164	33	0	29	102	22	50	269	.466
Iván Herrera	161	605	98	146	26	1	19	69	8	76	.241	.382
Alec Burleson	160	605	89	169	37	1	26	116	4	55	.279	.473
JJ Wetherholt	139	537	89	130	15	0	17	51	14	64	.242	.365
Masyn Winn	136	470	54	109	21	2	5	56	10	48	.232	.317
Nathan Church	142	434	53	107	17	2	10	50	10	25	.247	.364
José Fermín	118	327	33	81	17	0	6	41	8	30	.248	.355
Nolan Gorman	85	266	26	49	6	0	9	33	0	33	.184	.308
Pedro Pagés	82	189	14	41	6	0	4	12	2	14	.217	.312
Blaze Jordan	58	186	16	46	8	4	3	28	0	7	.247	.382
Bryan Torres	74	166	17	38	1	2	4	19	2	18	.229	.331
Victor Scott II	80	166	19	32	4	0	2	9	12	16	.193	.253
Thomas Saggese	57	162	25	38	5	1	4	14	4	13	.235	.352
Lars Nootbaar	48	158	22	37	8	1	3	16	1	24	.234	.354
Jimmy Crooks	52	134	10	24	6	0	5	14	0	9	.179	.336
Joshua Báez	29	100	18	23	7	0	7	18	2	4	.230	.510
Leo Bernal	24	95	12	27	3	0	5	21	0	7	.284	.474
Ramón Urías	43	86	14	13	3	0	4	9	0	9	.151	.326
Nelson Velázquez	34	74	10	16	4	0	4	12	0	7	.216	.432
César Prieto	16	38	2	3	0	1	0	0	1	1	.079	.132
Yohel Pozo	18	33	0	8	1	0	0	5	0	0	.242	.273
Everson Pereira	11	18	2	5	0	0	1	1	0	1	.278	.444
Totals	162	5458	720	1306	228	15	167	696	100	511	.239	.378

=== Pitching ===
Note: W = Wins; L = Losses; ERA = Earned run average; G = Games pitched; GS = Games started; SV = Saves; IP = Innings pitched; H = Hits allowed; R = Runs allowed; ER = Earned runs allowed; BB = Walks allowed; SO = Strikeouts

Player	W	L	ERA	G	GS	SV	IP	H	R	ER	BB	SO
Michael McGreevy	7	9	3.95	31	31	0	168.2	168	79	74	48	115
Andre Pallante	12	9	3.83	29	29	0	162.0	156	73	69	50	110
Matthew Liberatore	6	14	5.23	31	31	0	155.0	173	96	90	55	154
Kyle Leahy	10	5	3.66	30	30	0	140.0	147	58	57	41	132
Dustin May	5	7	4.38	21	21	0	109.0	105	56	53	35	106
Gordon Graceffo	8	2	2.67	62	1	1	81.0	53	28	24	36	63
Justin Bruihl	1	1	3.71	73	0	0	77.2	75	41	32	28	53
George Soriano	6	5	4.23	70	0	4	66.0	57	33	31	35	66
Riley O'Brien	3	9	4.08	66	0	38	64.0	53	35	29	29	64
Ryne Stanek	2	3	4.02	70	0	2	62.2	52	31	28	32	65
Hunter Dobbins	3	3	3.67	11	8	1	54.0	49	24	22	24	52
Quinn Mathews	2	4	3.83	9	9	0	49.1	48	21	21	20	46
Matt Svanson	2	3	7.27	41	1	0	43.1	55	39	35	21	41
JoJo Romero	1	3	3.35	44	0	0	43.0	40	17	16	16	43
Luis Gastélum	5	4	4.42	34	0	0	36.2	34	23	18	12	44
Ryan Fernandez	1	2	3.52	17	0	0	23.0	19	14	9	11	28
Brycen Mautz	0	1	5.87	8	1	0	15.1	18	10	10	11	19
Peter Strzelecki	1	1	5.79	8	0	0	14.0	13	9	9	6	8
Cade Winquest	1	0	3.95	11	0	0	13.2	9	8	6	8	16
Cooper Hjerpe	1	0	4.38	4	0	0	12.1	7	6	6	9	15
Jared Shuster	0	0	9.00	5	0	0	9.0	11	10	9	6	4
Max Rajcic	0	0	5.00	6	0	0	9.0	6	5	5	6	8
Caleb Ferguson	0	0	8.64	9	0	0	8.1	11	8	8	8	9
Matt Pushard	0	0	5.14	6	0	0	7.0	6	5	4	4	6
Chris Roycroft	0	0	15.19	7	0	0	5.1	13	9	9	8	4
Bruce Zimmermann	0	0	5.40	1	0	0	5.0	6	3	3	1	2
Hancel Rincon	0	0	27.00	3	0	0	2.1	5	7	7	1	3
Scott Blewett	0	0	0.00	1	0	0	2.0	1	0	0	2	2
Bryan Torres	0	0	0.00	1	0	0	2.0	1	0	0	1	0
Pedro Pagés	0	0	4.50	2	0	0	2.0	2	1	1	0	0
Totals	77	85	4.27	162	162	46	1442.2	1393	749	684	564	1278

== Minor league system and first-year player draft ==
=== Teams ===
Level	Team	League	Division	Manager	W–L/Stats	Standing	Refs
Triple-A	Memphis Redbirds	International League	West	Ben Johnson			
Double-A	Springfield Cardinals	Texas League	North	Patrick Anderson			
High-A	Peoria Chiefs	Midwest League	West	Roberto Espinoza			
Single-A	Palm Beach Cardinals	Florida State League	East	Rich Benjamin			
Rookie	FCL Cardinals	Florida Complex League	East	Willi Martin			
Foreign Rookie	DSL Cardinals	Dominican Summer League	Boca Chica South	Fray Peniche			
