= Thomas Saggese =

American baseball player (born 2002)

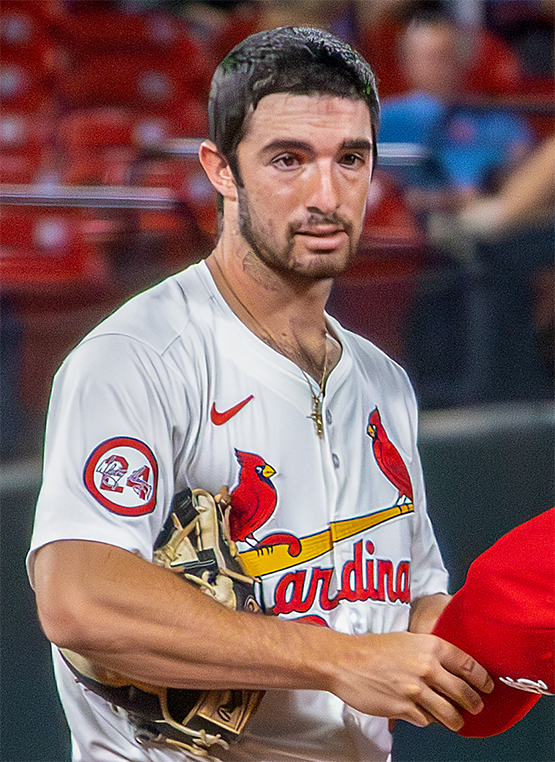
- Saggese with the Cardinals in 2024

St. Louis Cardinals – No. 25
- Utility player
- Born: April 10, 2002 (age 24); Carlsbad, California, U.S.
- Bats: Right Throws: Right

MLB debut
- September 10, 2024, for the St. Louis Cardinals

MLB statistics (through 2026 season)
- Batting average: .245
- Home runs: 7
- Runs batted in: 43
- Stats at Baseball Reference

Teams
- St. Louis Cardinals (2024–present)

Thomas Darren Saggese (/səˈdʒeɪsiː/ sə-JAY-see; born April 10, 2002) is an American professional baseball utility player for the St. Louis Cardinals of Major League Baseball (MLB). He made his MLB debut in 2024.

== Amateur career ==
Saggese attended Carlsbad High School in Carlsbad, California. As a junior in 2019, he hit .422 with 10 home runs over 102 at-bats. He batted .440 with three home runs over seven games in 2020 before the season was canceled due to the COVID-19 pandemic.

== Professional career ==
=== Texas Rangers ===
The Texas Rangers selected Saggese in the fifth round with the 145th overall pick in the 2020 Major League Baseball draft. He signed with the club for $800,000, forgoing his commitment to play college baseball at Pepperdine University.

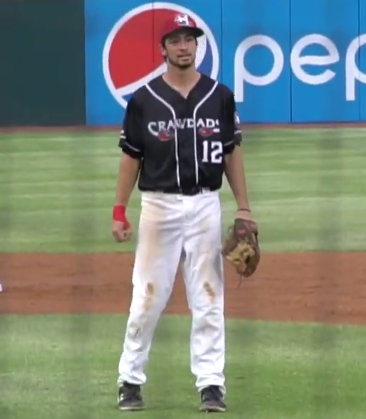
Saggese with the Hickory Crawdads in 2022

Saggese made his professional debut in 2021 with the Down East Wood Ducks of the Low-A East, batting .256 with 10 home runs, 37 RBI, and 11 stolen bases over 73 games. He opened the 2022 season with the Hickory Crawdads of the High-A South Atlantic League, where he was named the Rangers' Minor League Player of the Month for July. He was promoted to the Frisco RoughRiders of the Double-A Texas League for the season's final week and playoffs. Over 103 games between the two teams, he slashed .312/.361/.506 with 15 home runs, 70 RBI, 25 doubles, and 12 stolen bases. Saggese received the Texas Rangers 2022 True Ranger Award, and was named to the South Atlantic League postseason All-Star Team. He returned to Frisco to open the 2023 season.

=== St. Louis Cardinals ===
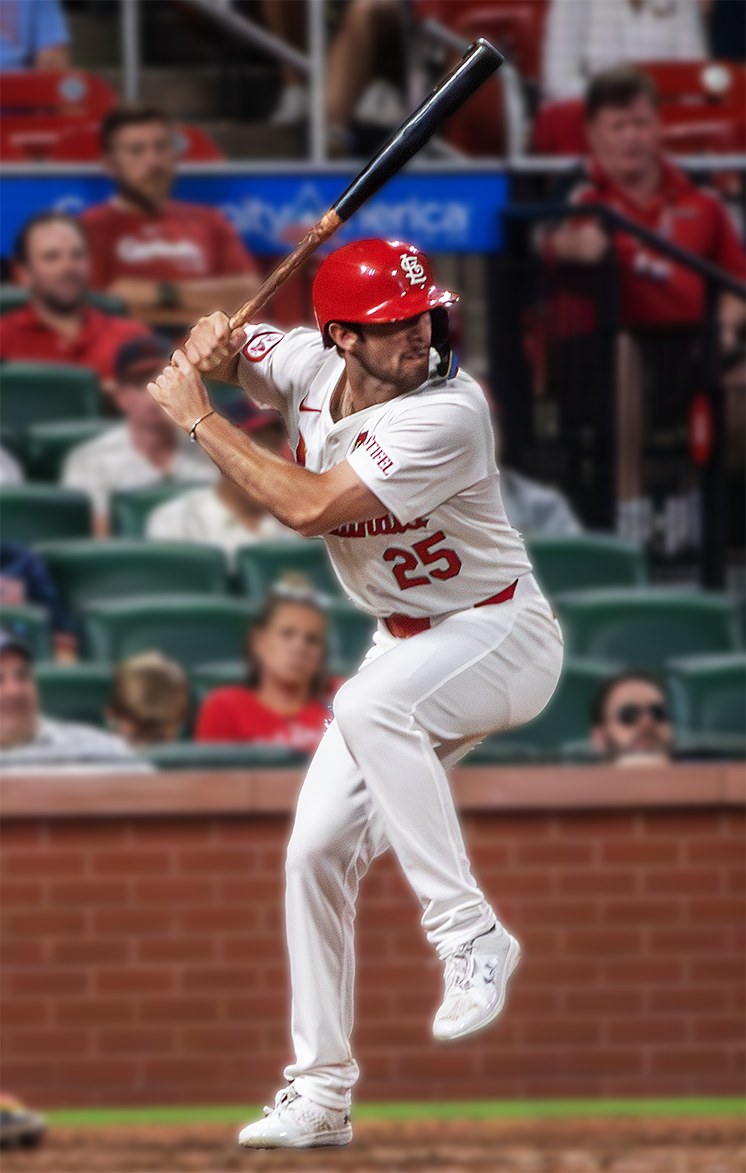
Saggese with St. Louis

On July 30, 2023, the Rangers traded Saggese, John King, and Tekoah Roby to the St. Louis Cardinals in exchange for Jordan Montgomery and Chris Stratton. He was assigned to the Springfield Cardinals of the Double-A Texas League before being promoted to the Memphis Redbirds of the Triple-A International League in early September. Over 139 games played, Saggese slashed .306/.374/.530 with 26 home runs, 111 RBI, and 34 doubles. After the season, he won the 2023 Texas League Most Valuable Player Award.

Saggese spent a majority of the 2024 season with Triple-A Memphis, hitting .253 with twenty home runs and 67 RBI over 125 games. On September 10, 2024, Saggese was selected to the 40-man roster, promoted, and made his MLB debut against the Cincinnati Reds in replacement of Brendan Donovan, who was out due to a foot injury. He hit his first MLB home run, a solo home run, on September 13 off of Toronto Blue Jays pitcher Génesis Cabrera. In 18 appearances for the Cardinals during his rookie campaign, Saggese batted .204/.250/.306 with one home run and four RBI.

Saggese was optioned to Memphis to begin the 2025 season. He played in 42 games for Memphis and hit .317 with five home runs. The Cardinals promoted Saggese to the major leagues on April 2 when Nolan Gorman went on the injured list. Saggese appeared in 82 games for the Cardinals during the season, appearing at third base, second base, and shortstop, and hit .258 with two home runs and 25 RBI.

Saggese made the Cardinals' Opening Day roster in 2026. He was optioned to Memphis on May 4 but recalled one day later following an injury to Ramón Urías. On June 5, he was optioned back to Memphis. On August 28, Saggese was recalled by St. Louis following an injury to Blaze Jordan. On September 1, he had his first career multihomer game with two home runs against the Los Angeles Dodgers, making him the first Cardinal to hit two home runs at Dodger Stadium since Albert Pujols on September 23, 2022. Saggese played in 57 games for the Cardinals and batted .235 with four home runs and 14 RBI. He played 55 games with Memphis and hit .258 with ten home runs and 33 RBI.

== International career ==
Saggese played for Team Italy in the 2026 World Baseball Classic.
