= Alec Burleson =

American baseball player (born 1998)

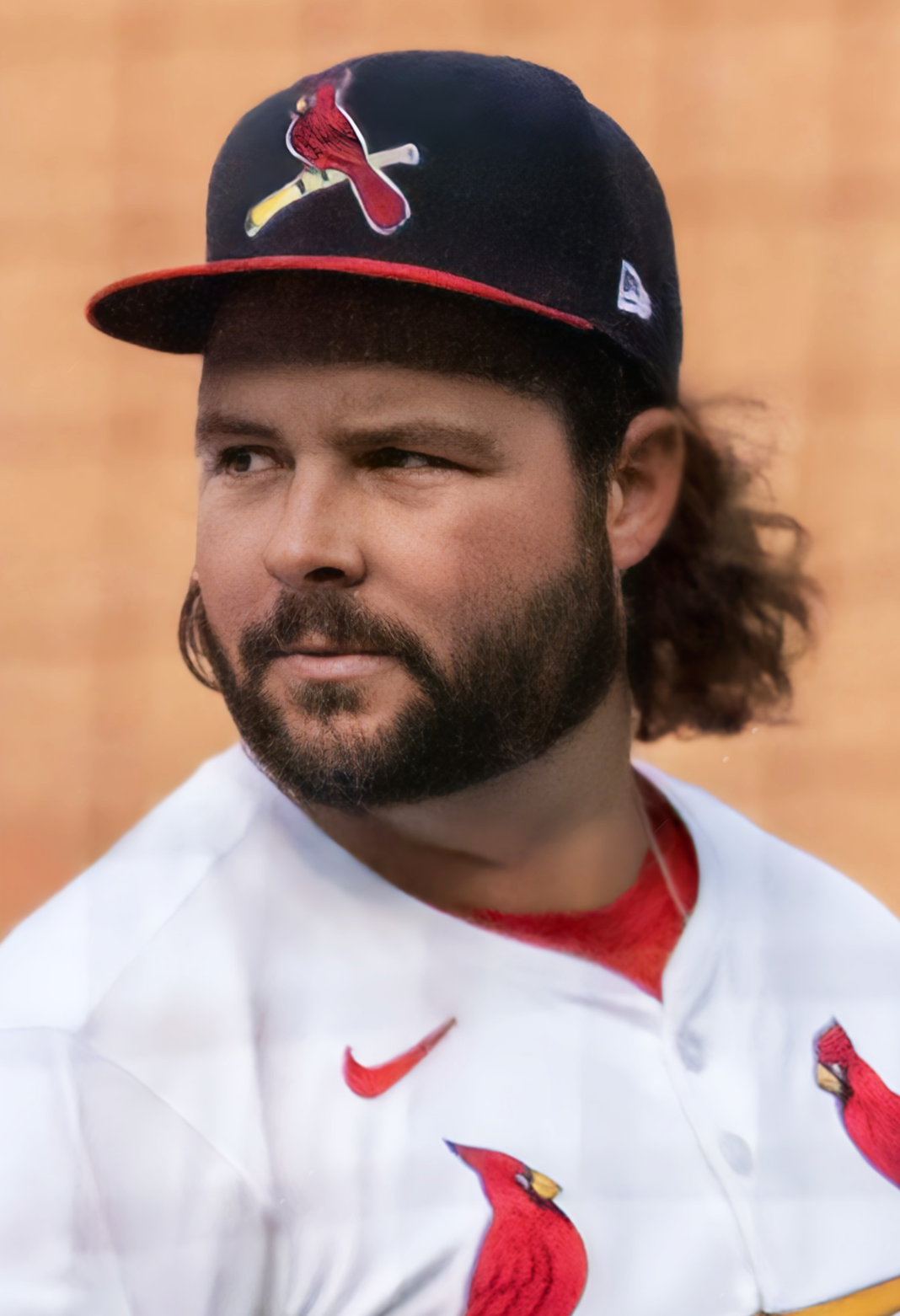
- Burleson in 2025 with the St. Louis Cardinals

St. Louis Cardinals – No. 41
- First baseman / Outfielder
- Born: November 25, 1998 (age 27); Charlotte, North Carolina, U.S.
- Bats: Left Throws: Left

MLB debut
- September 8, 2022, for the St. Louis Cardinals

MLB statistics (through 2026 season)
- Batting average: .271
- Home runs: 74
- Runs batted in: 302
- Stats at Baseball Reference

Teams
- St. Louis Cardinals (2022–present)

Career highlights and awards
- Silver Slugger Award (2025); MLB RBI leader (2026)

Alec Michael Burleson (born November 25, 1998) is an American professional baseball first baseman and outfielder for the St. Louis Cardinals of Major League Baseball (MLB).

Born and raised in North Carolina, Burleson played college baseball at East Carolina University and was selected by the Cardinals in the second round of the 2020 MLB draft. Burleson played in the minor leagues before making his MLB debut near the end of the 2022 season. Burleson became a regular member of the Cardinals lineup in 2023, and was awarded his first Silver Slugger Award as a utility player in 2025. In 2026, he led MLB in RBI.

== Amateur career ==
Burleson attended East Lincoln High School in Denver, North Carolina. As a junior in 2016, he hit .390 with six home runs alongside pitching to a 0.83 ERA. In 2017, his senior year, he had a .429 batting average with three home runs, nine doubles, and 23 runs batted in (RBI) and was named the Southern District 7 2A Offensive Player of the Year. He went undrafted in the 2017 Major League Baseball draft, and enrolled at East Carolina University where he played college baseball.

As a freshman at East Carolina in 2018, Burleson batted .252 with 18 RBI over 36 games and 103 at-bats alongside pitching 54 innings, going 5–2 with a 3.33 ERA and four saves. He was named the American Athletic Conference Rookie Pitcher of the Year. That summer, he played in the Cal Ripken Collegiate Baseball League for the Bethesda Big Train. In 2019, his sophomore season, he hit .370 with nine home runs and 61 RBI, and pitched to a 6–2 record and 3.28 ERA over 60 1/3 innings. He was named to the AAC First Team as an outfielder, and to the Second Team as a utility player. Over the summer, he played for the USA Baseball Collegiate National Team and also made a brief appearance in the Cape Cod Baseball League with the Bourne Braves. In 2020, his junior season, Burleson hit .375 with three home runs and 12 RBI over 17 games, alongside pitching to a 4.24 ERA over four starts, before the college baseball season was cut short due to the COVID-19 pandemic. Over his collegiate career, Burleson started games at first base, left field, right field, designated hitter, and as a pitcher.

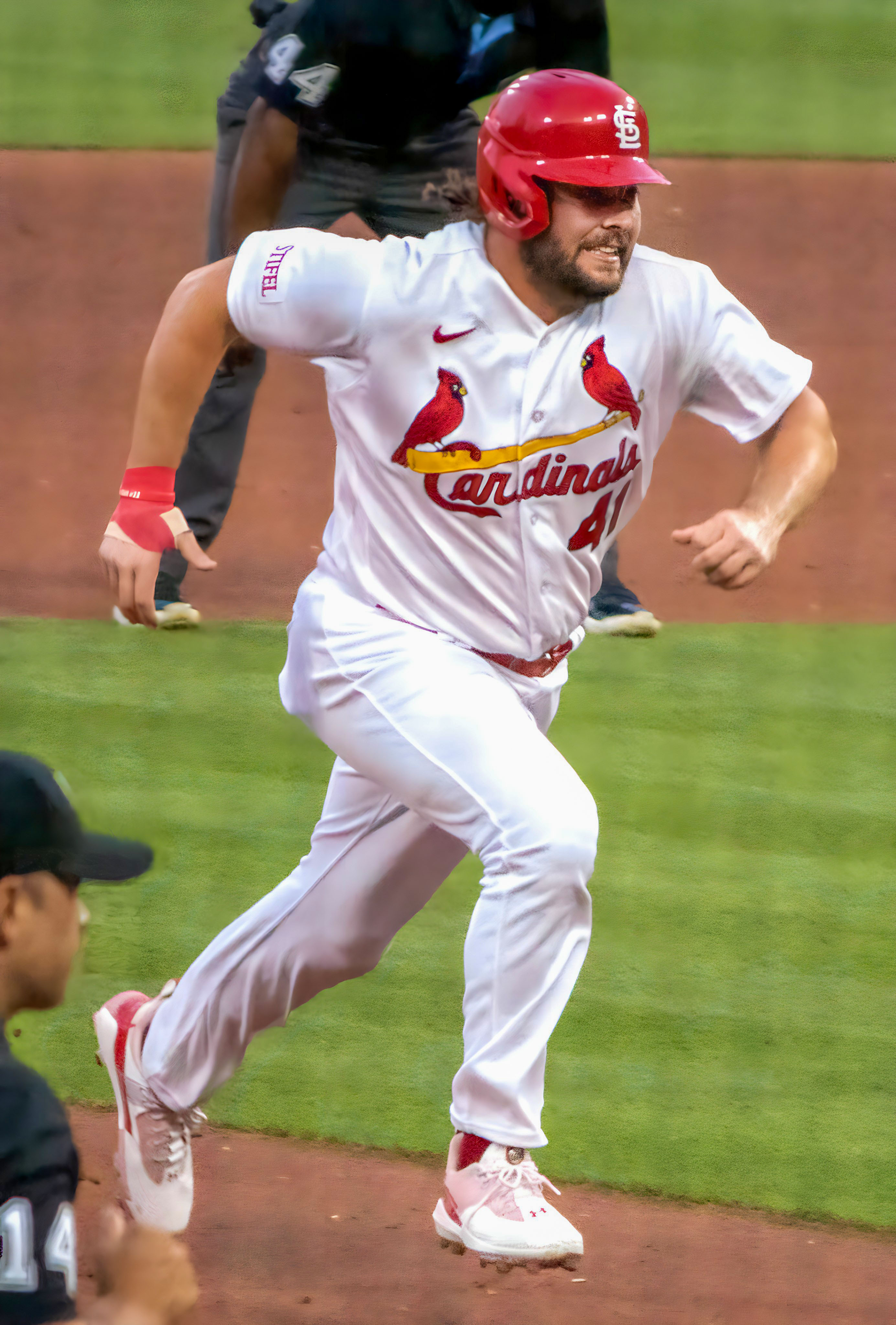
Burleson in 2023

== Professional career ==
=== Minor leagues ===
After the season, Burleson was selected by the St. Louis Cardinals as an outfielder in the second round (70th overall) of the 2020 Major League Baseball draft. He signed for $700,000. He did not play a minor league game in 2020 because the season was cancelled. To begin the 2021 season, he was assigned to the Peoria Chiefs of the High-A Central. He was quickly promoted to the Springfield Cardinals of the Double-A Central, and was then promoted to the Memphis Redbirds of the Triple-A East in early August. Burleson ended the 2021 season with a combined .270/.329/.454 slash line with 22 home runs and 76 RBI over 119 games between the three clubs.

Burleson returned to Memphis to begin the 2022 season. Over 109 games, he slashed .331/.372/.532 with 20 home runs, 87 RBI, and 25 doubles.

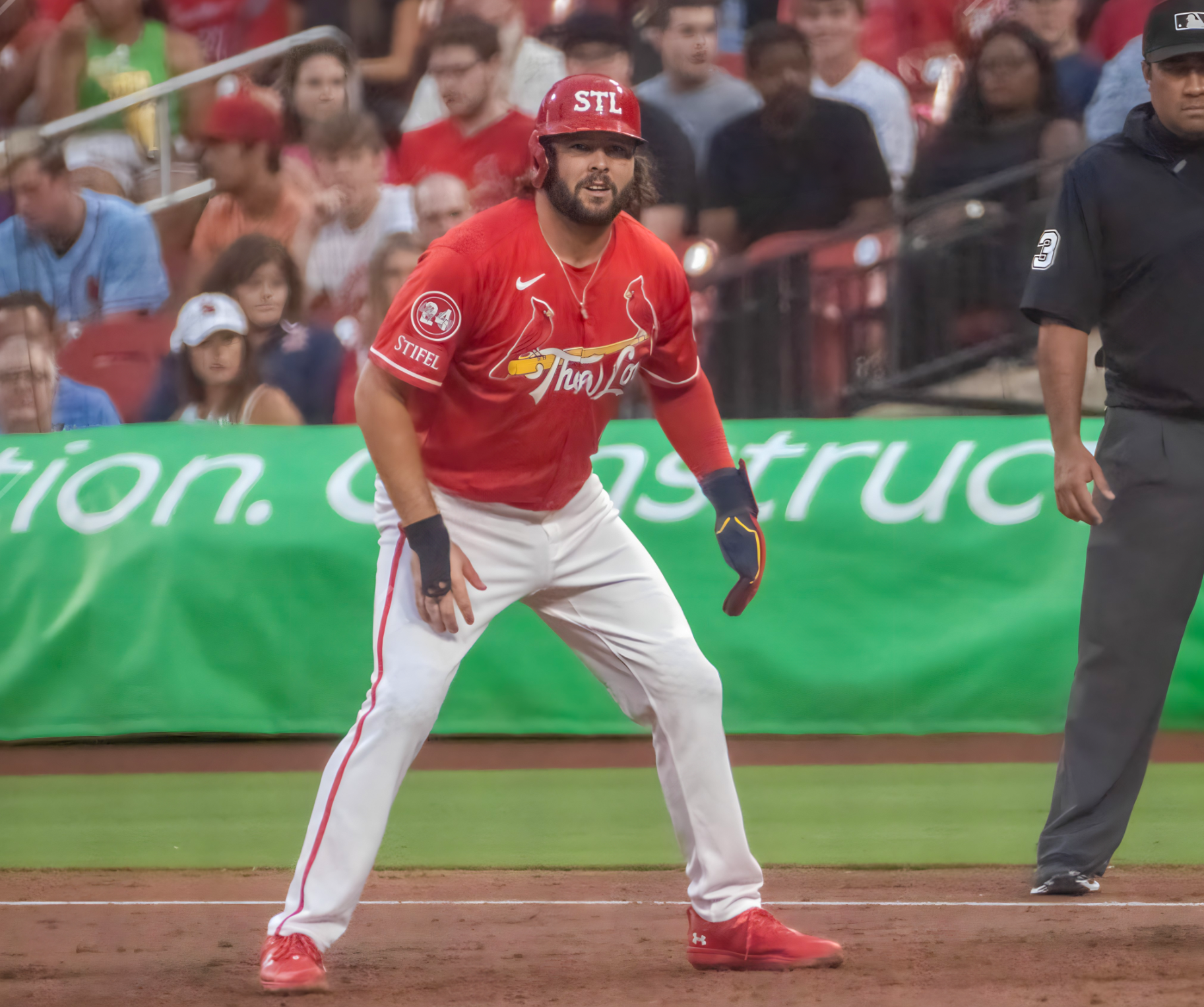
Burleson of the St.Louis Cardinals in 2024

=== Major leagues ===
On September 6, 2022, the Cardinals selected Burleson's contract and promoted him to the major leagues. He made his MLB debut on September 8 as the club's starting right fielder, going hitless over four at-bats with a walk in an 11–6 loss to the Washington Nationals. Burleson collected his first MLB hit on September 11, a single off Duane Underwood Jr. of the Pittsburgh Pirates in a 4–3 St. Louis win. He hit his first MLB home run on September 23 off of Hanser Alberto of the Los Angeles Dodgers at Dodger Stadium in an 11–0 Cardinals win. Over 48 at-bats in 16 games with the Cardinals during his rookie campaign, Burleson hit .188 with one home run, three RBI, and one double.

Burleson spent the entirety of the 2023 season with St. Louis and appeared in 107 games, batting .244 with eight home runs and 36 RBI. He broke his thumb in September, ending his season early. Burleson spent time in left field, right field, first base, and as a designated hitter.

In 2024, Burleson was an everyday player for the Cardinals, appearing in 152 games, leading the club with 78 RBI while slashing .269/.314/.420 with 21 home runs.

Burleson played in 139 games for the Cardinals in 2025 as a first baseman, left fielder, right fielder, and designated hitter. He hit .290 with 18 home runs and 69 RBI. Burleson was awarded his first career Silver Slugger Award for his play as a utility player.

In 2026, following the departure of Willson Contreras in the offseason, Burleson became the Cardinals' everyday first baseman. On August 3, 2026, Burleson hit three home runs in a 13–7 victory over the New York Yankees at Yankee Stadium. He played in 160 games for St. Louis, slashing .279/.343/.473, and posting career-highs in home runs (26), RBI (116), doubles (37), and hits (169). Burleson's 116 RBI led the majors, and he became the first Cardinals player to lead MLB in RBI since Joe Torre (137) in 1971.

== Personal life ==
Burleson and his wife, Mary, were married in November 2023 and reside near Greenville, North Carolina. Their first child, a son, was born in 2025.
