= John King (baseball) =

American baseball player (born 1994)

Free agent
- Pitcher
- Born: September 14, 1994 (age 32); Laredo, Texas, U.S.
- Bats: Left Throws: Left

MLB debut
- September 4, 2020, for the Texas Rangers

MLB statistics (through 2026 season)
- Win–loss record: 22–16
- Earned run average: 3.83
- Strikeouts: 198
- Stats at Baseball Reference

Teams
- Texas Rangers (2020–2023); St. Louis Cardinals (2023–2025); Miami Marlins (2026)

John Edward King (born September 14, 1994) is an American professional baseball pitcher who is a free agent. He has previously played in Major League Baseball (MLB) for the Texas Rangers, St. Louis Cardinals and Miami Marlins.

== Amateur career ==
King attended William P. Clements High School in Sugar Land, Texas. He played college baseball at Angelina College in Lufkin, Texas in 2014 and 2015. He then attended the University of Houston for two years (2016 and 2017), playing for the Cougars. He tore the UCL in his left elbow during his senior season and continued to pitch through the injury. He was drafted by the Texas Rangers in the 10th round, with the 314th overall selection, of the 2017 MLB draft, and signed with them for a $10,000 signing bonus.

== Professional career ==
=== Texas Rangers ===
Upon signing, King underwent Tommy John surgery on July 5, 2017. He rehabbed through the majority of the 2018 season, returning that September and appearing in one game for the AZL Rangers of the Rookie-level Arizona League and in three games for the Spokane Indians of the Low-A Northwest League. He was assigned to the Hickory Crawdads of the Single-A South Atlantic League to open the 2019 season, and went 1–2 with a 3.42 ERA over 26 1/3 innings. He was promoted to the Down East Wood Ducks of the High-A Carolina League on May 10, and went 2–4 with a 2.03 ERA over 71 innings for them.

On September 4, 2020, King’s contract was selected to the active roster and made his major league debut that day against the Seattle Mariners. In 10 1/3 innings for Texas in 2020, King went 1–0 with a 6.10 ERA and 9 strikeouts. Over 46 innings in 2021 for Texas, King posted a 7–5 record with a 3.52 ERA and 40 strikeouts. King was placed on the IL in July, and underwent surgery for Thoracic outlet syndrome in September 2021.

King split the 2022 season between Texas and the Round Rock Express of the Triple-A Pacific Coast League. With Texas he posted a 1–4 record with a 4.03 ERA and 30 strikeouts over 50 1/3 innings; with Round Rock he went 2–1 with a 7.27 ERA over 17 1/3 innings.

King was optioned to Triple-A Round Rock to begin the 2023 season. He made 15 appearances for Texas, recording a 5.79 ERA and 1-1 record with 10 strikeouts across 18 2/3 innings pitched.

=== St. Louis Cardinals ===
On July 30, 2023, the Rangers traded King, Tekoah Roby, and Thomas Saggese to the St. Louis Cardinals in exchange for Jordan Montgomery and Chris Stratton. In 20 appearances out of the bullpen, he recorded a 1.45 ERA with 10 strikeouts across 18 2/3 innings pitched.

King was optioned to the Triple–A Memphis Redbirds to begin the 2024 season. He made 56 relief appearances for St. Louis during the year, compiling a 3-3 record and 2.85 ERA with 38 strikeouts over 60 innings of work.

King pitched in 51 games for the Cardinals in 2025, registering a 2-1 record and 4.66 ERA with 28 strikeouts across 48 1/3 innings pitched. On November 21, 2025, King was non-tendered by the Cardinals and became a free agent.

=== Miami Marlins ===
On February 12, 2026, King signed a one-year, $1.5 million contract with the Miami Marlins. He made 50 appearances (including one start) for Miami, compiling a 6–2 record and 3.99 ERA with 33 strikeouts and one save across 49 2/3 innings pitched. King was designated for assignment by the Marlins on August 23 and was released on August 26.

=== Texas Rangers (second stint) ===
On August 31, 2026, King signed a minor league contract with the Texas Rangers. In 4 games with Triple-A Round Rock Express he threw 7 innings of relief going 0-0 with a 3.86 ERA and 4 strikeouts. He elected free agency on November 2.
