= Bryan Torres =

Puerto Rican baseball player (born 1997)

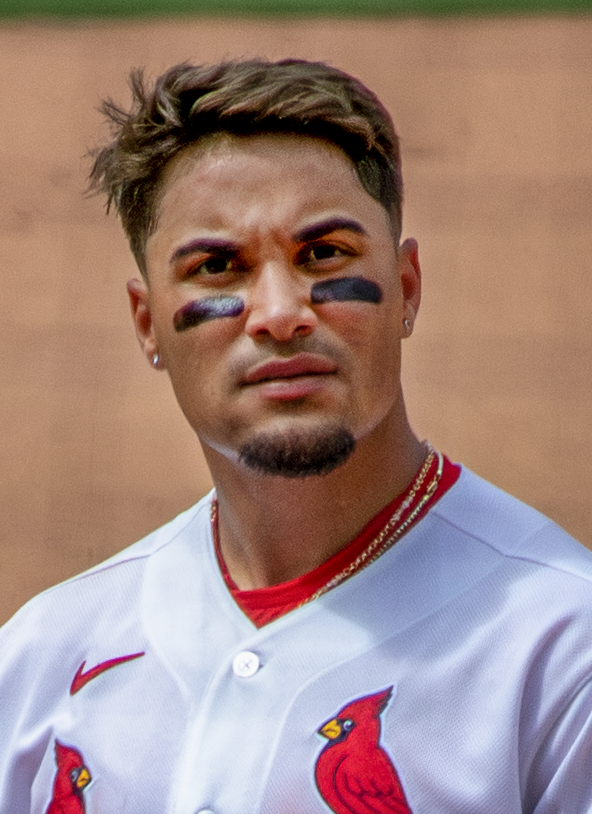
- Torres with the Cardinals in 2026

St. Louis Cardinals – No. 39
- Outfielder / Second baseman
- Born: July 2, 1997 (age 29); Caguas, Puerto Rico
- Bats: Left Throws: Right

MLB debut
- May 23, 2026, for the St. Louis Cardinals

MLB statistics (through 2026 season)
- Batting average: .229
- Home runs: 4
- Runs batted in: 19
- Stats at Baseball Reference

Teams
- St. Louis Cardinals (2026–present)

Bryan Torres (born July 2, 1997) is a Puerto Rican professional baseball outfielder and second baseman for the St. Louis Cardinals of Major League Baseball (MLB). He made his MLB debut in 2026.

== Career ==
=== Milwaukee Brewers ===
On July 15, 2015, Torres signed with the Milwaukee Brewers as an international free agent. He spent the first three seasons of his career with the Dominican Summer League Brewers, playing in a total of 101 games.

Torres split the 2018 season between the rookie-level Arizona League Brewers and rookie-level Helena Brewers, playing in 39 games and batting a cumulative .285/.326/.369 with one home run, 18 RBI, and four stolen bases. He spent the 2019 season with the rookie-level Rocky Mountain Vibes, slashing .283/.373/.356 with 27 RBI and 21 stolen bases across 67 appearances.

=== San Francisco Giants ===
On December 12, 2019, the San Francisco Giants selected Torres in the minor league phase of the Rule 5 draft. He did not play in a game in 2020 due to the cancellation of the minor league season because of the COVID-19 pandemic. In 2021, Torres made 43 appearances for the Double-A Richmond Flying Squirrels, batting .280/.319/.348 with nine RBI and six stolen bases. Torres elected free agency following the season on November 7, 2021.

=== Milwaukee Milkmen ===
On April 1, 2022, Torres signed with the Milwaukee Milkmen of the American Association of Professional Baseball. He made 93 appearances for the team, batting .374/.435/.489 with three home runs, 56 RBI, and 22 stolen bases. Torres returned to Milwaukee to begin the 2023 season, slashing .370/.464/.540 with 11 home runs, 67 RBI, and 71 stolen bases.

=== St. Louis Cardinals ===
On September 21, 2023, Torres signed a minor league contract with the St. Louis Cardinals organization. He made 121 appearances for the Double-A Springfield Cardinals during the 2024 campaign, hitting .331/.418/.416 with two home runs, 56 RBI, and 33 stolen bases.

Torres made 105 appearances for the Triple-A Memphis Redbirds in 2025, batting .328/.441/.464 with nine home runs, 51 RBI, and 26 stolen bases. On November 6, 2025, the Cardinals added Torres to their 40-man roster, preventing him from reaching minor league free agency.

The Cardinals optioned Torres to Triple-A Memphis to begin the 2026 season. In 36 appearances for the Redbirds, he batted .336/.454/.477 with two home runs, 16 RBI, and 10 stolen bases. On May 22, 2026, Torres was promoted to the major leagues for the first time. In his debut the following day, Torres reached base three times, including hitting his first career home run off of Cincinnati Reds reliever Connor Phillips.

== See also ==
- Rule 5 draft results
