= Gordon Graceffo =

American baseball player (born 2000)

St. Louis Cardinals – No. 44
- Pitcher
- Born: March 17, 2000 (age 26); Wayne, New Jersey, U.S.
- Bats: Right Throws: Right

MLB debut
- June 29, 2024, for the St. Louis Cardinals

MLB statistics (through 2026 season)
- Win–loss record: 11–4
- Earned run average: 3.96
- Strikeouts: 109
- Stats at Baseball Reference

Teams
- St. Louis Cardinals (2024–present)

Gordon Joseph Graceffo (/ɡrəˈsɛfoʊ/ grə-SEF-oh; born March 17, 2000) is an American professional baseball pitcher for the St. Louis Cardinals of Major League Baseball (MLB). He made his MLB debut in 2024.

== Early life ==
Gordon Joseph Graceffo was born March 17, 2000, in Wayne, New Jersey, as the oldest of Gerald and Melanie Graceffo's three children. Raised in Cranford, New Jersey, he grew up a fan of the New York Yankees of Major League Baseball (MLB).

== College career ==
Graceffo attended Cranford High School in Cranford, New Jersey and played college baseball at Villanova University. As a redshirt sophomore in 2021, he started 11 games and went 7–2 with a 1.54 ERA, 86 strikeouts, and 13 walks over 82 innings. After the season, he briefly played in the Cape Cod Baseball League for the Bourne Braves.

== Professional career ==
Graceffo was selected by the St. Louis Cardinals in the fifth round of the 2021 Major League Baseball draft. He signed with the Cardinals and made his professional debut with the Palm Beach Cardinals of the Single-A Florida State League, going 1–0 with a 1.73 ERA and 37 strikeouts over 26 innings. He opened the 2022 season with the Peoria Chiefs of the High-A Midwest League. After eight starts in which he went 3–2 with a 0.99 ERA, 56 strikeouts, and four walks over 45 2/3 innings, he was promoted to the Springfield Cardinals of the Double-A Texas League. He was named the Cardinals' Minor League Pitcher of the Month for both April and May. Over 18 starts with Springfield, Graceffo posted a 7–4 record with a 3.94 ERA and 83 strikeouts over 93 2/3 innings. For the 2023 season, Graceffo was assigned to the Memphis Redbirds of the Triple-A International League. He missed time during the season due to shoulder inflammation. Over 21 games (18 starts), Graceffo went 4–3 with a 4.92 ERA and 81 strikeouts over 86 innings.

Graceffo returned to Memphis to open the 2024 season. In his first 14 starts, he compiled an 8–5 record and 3.84 ERA with 70 strikeouts across 75 innings. On June 28, 2024, Graceffo was selected to the 40-man roster and promoted to the major leagues for the first time. Graceffo made his major league debut the next day on June 29, 2024, pitching 4 1/3 innings in relief against the Cincinnati Reds. He made two appearances (one start) during his rookie campaign, posting an 0-1 record and 4.70 ERA with six strikeouts across 7 2/3 innings pitched. Graceffo played with Memphis when not with St. Louis, with whom he finished the season with a 10–8 record and a 4.85 ERA across 130 innings.

Graceffo was optioned to Memphis to begin the 2025 season. He was recalled by St. Louis for the first time on April 6. On April 30, Graceffo recorded his first career win after pitching five innings against the Cincinnati Reds, in which he allowed one run and struck out five while walking none. Graceffo was recalled and optioned between St. Louis and Memphis multiple times during the season. Across 26 relief appearances with St. Louis, he went 3-1 with a 6.28 ERA and 40 strikeouts over 43 innings. He appeared in 24 games with Memphis, going 2-4 with a 3.77 ERA.

The Cardinals optioned Graceffo to Memphis to begin the 2026 season. They promoted him on March 31 to take the place of Matt Pushard, who went on the injured list. He was optioned to Memphis on July 3, before he was recalled by St. Louis three days later. Graceffo made 62 appearances for the Cardinals and had an 8–2 record, a 2.67 ERA, and 63 strikeouts across 81 innings.

== International career ==
Graceffo was selected to play for Team Italy in the 2026 World Baseball Classic.
