= Kyle Leahy =

American baseball player (born 1997)

St. Louis Cardinals – No. 62
- Pitcher
- Born: June 4, 1997 (age 29); Boulder, Colorado, U.S.
- Bats: Switch Throws: Right

MLB debut
- July 7, 2023, for the St. Louis Cardinals

MLB statistics (through 2026 season)
- Win–loss record: 15–9
- Earned run average: 3.65
- Strikeouts: 247
- Stats at Baseball Reference

Teams
- St. Louis Cardinals (2023–present)

Kyle Yandow Leahy (LAY-hee; born June 4, 1997) is an American professional baseball pitcher for the St. Louis Cardinals of Major League Baseball (MLB). He made his MLB debut in 2023.

== Career ==
=== Amateur career ===
Leahy graduated from Erie High School in Erie, Colorado, in 2015. Playing for the school's baseball team, he had a 9–1 win–loss record and a 0.41 earned run average (ERA) in his senior year, and was named the Longmont Times-Call's player of the year. He enrolled at Colorado Mesa University to play college baseball for the Colorado Mesa Mavericks. In the summers of 2016 and 2017, he played collegiate summer baseball with the Waterloo Bucks of the Northwoods League.

=== Professional career ===
The St. Louis Cardinals selected Leahy in the 17th round, with the 513th overall selection, of the 2018 Major League Baseball draft. He made his professional debut with the rookie–level Johnson City Cardinals, pitching to a 5.52 ERA across 13 contests. Leahy split the 2019 season between the Single–A Peoria Chiefs, High–A Palm Beach Cardinals, and Double–A Springfield Cardinals. In 23 games (22 starts) between the three affiliates, he accumulated a 5–13 record and 3.73 ERA with 102 strikeouts in 123 innings pitched. He did not play in a game in 2020 due to the cancellation of the minor league season because of the COVID-19 pandemic.

In 2021, Leahy appeared in 25 games and struggling to an 0–8 record and 8.20 ERA with 63 strikeouts across 86 2/3 innings pitched. In 2022, Leahy spent time with Springfield for a third season, also appearing in one game for the Triple–A Memphis Redbirds. In 28 games (26 starts) for Springfield, he pitched to a 10–7 record and 5.29 ERA with a career–high 146 strikeouts across 144 2/3 innings of work. Leahy began the 2023 season back with Triple-A Memphis, pitching in 28 games and recording a 4.06 ERA with 51 strikeouts in 51 innings pitched.

On July 6, 2023, Leahy was selected to the 40-man roster and promoted to the major leagues for the first time. In three games for St. Louis, he allowed four runs on four hits and five walks with two strikeouts in 1 2/3 innings pitched. Following the season on October 26, Leahy was removed from the 40–man roster and sent outright to Triple–A Memphis.

On April 30, 2024, the Cardinals selected Leahy's contract, adding him back to the major league roster. Leahy was optioned to Memphis five times during the season. For the Cardinals, he appeared in 33 games in relief, going 1-1 with a 4.07 ERA and 33 strikeouts over 48 2/3 innings.

Leahy was named to St. Louis' 2025 Opening Day roster. In 2025, he appeared in 62 games, all in relief, with the exception of the last game of the season.

Leahy was slotted into the starting rotation for the 2026 season.
