= Hancel Rincon =

Dominican baseball player (born 2002)

St. Louis Cardinals – No. 66
- Pitcher
- Born: April 28, 2002 (age 24); Los Llanos, Dominican Republic
- Bats: Right Throws: Right

MLB debut
- September 4, 2026, for the St. Louis Cardinals

MLB statistics (through 2026 season)
- Win–loss record: 0–0
- Earned run average: 27.00
- Strikeouts: 3
- Stats at Baseball Reference

Teams
- St. Louis Cardinals (2026–present)

Hancel Alexander Rincon (born April 28, 2002) is a Dominican professional baseball pitcher for the St. Louis Cardinals of Major League Baseball (MLB). He made his MLB debut in 2026.

== Career ==
On January 26, 2019, Rincon signed with the St. Louis Cardinals as an international free agent. He made his professional debut with the Dominican Summer League Cardinals, compiling a 1–5 record and 3.75 ERA with 41 strikeouts across 50 1/3 innings pitched. Rincon did not play in a game in 2020 due to the cancellation of the minor league season because of the COVID-19 pandemic.

Rincon returned to the DSL Cardinals in 2021, recording a 1.84 ERA with 55 strikeouts in 49 innings pitched across 11 starts. He split the 2022 season between the rookie–level Florida Complex League Cardinals and Single–A Palm Beach Cardinals, accumulating a 3–8 record and 4.34 ERA with 57 strikeouts across 15 games (including 12 starts). Rincon made 24 appearances (23 starts) for Palm Beach during the 2023 season, compiling a 9–6 record and 3.26 ERA with 97 strikeouts across 132 2/3 innings pitched.

Rincon started 24 contests for the High–A Peoria Chiefs in 2024, posting a 9–7 record and 3.80 ERA with 105 strikeouts across 132 2/3 innings pitched. He split the 2025 season between Peoria and the Double–A Springfield Cardinals. In 19 appearances (including 17 starts) for the two affiliates, Rincon logged a cumulative 4–5 record and 3.92 ERA with 108 strikeouts over 96 1/3 innings of work.

Rincon began the 2026 season with the Triple–A Memphis Redbirds, registering a 6–6 record and 4.04 ERA with 88 strikeouts and one save. On August 31, 2026, it was announced that the Cardinals would be promoting Rincon to the major leagues for the first time. On September 4, 2026, Rincon made his major league debut against the Colorado Rockies. During Rincon's debut, umpire Doug Eddings instructed him to adjust his hat, prompting Cardinals manager Oliver Marmol to express frustration with Eddings leading to him getting ejected.
