= Brycen Mautz =

American baseball player (born 2001)

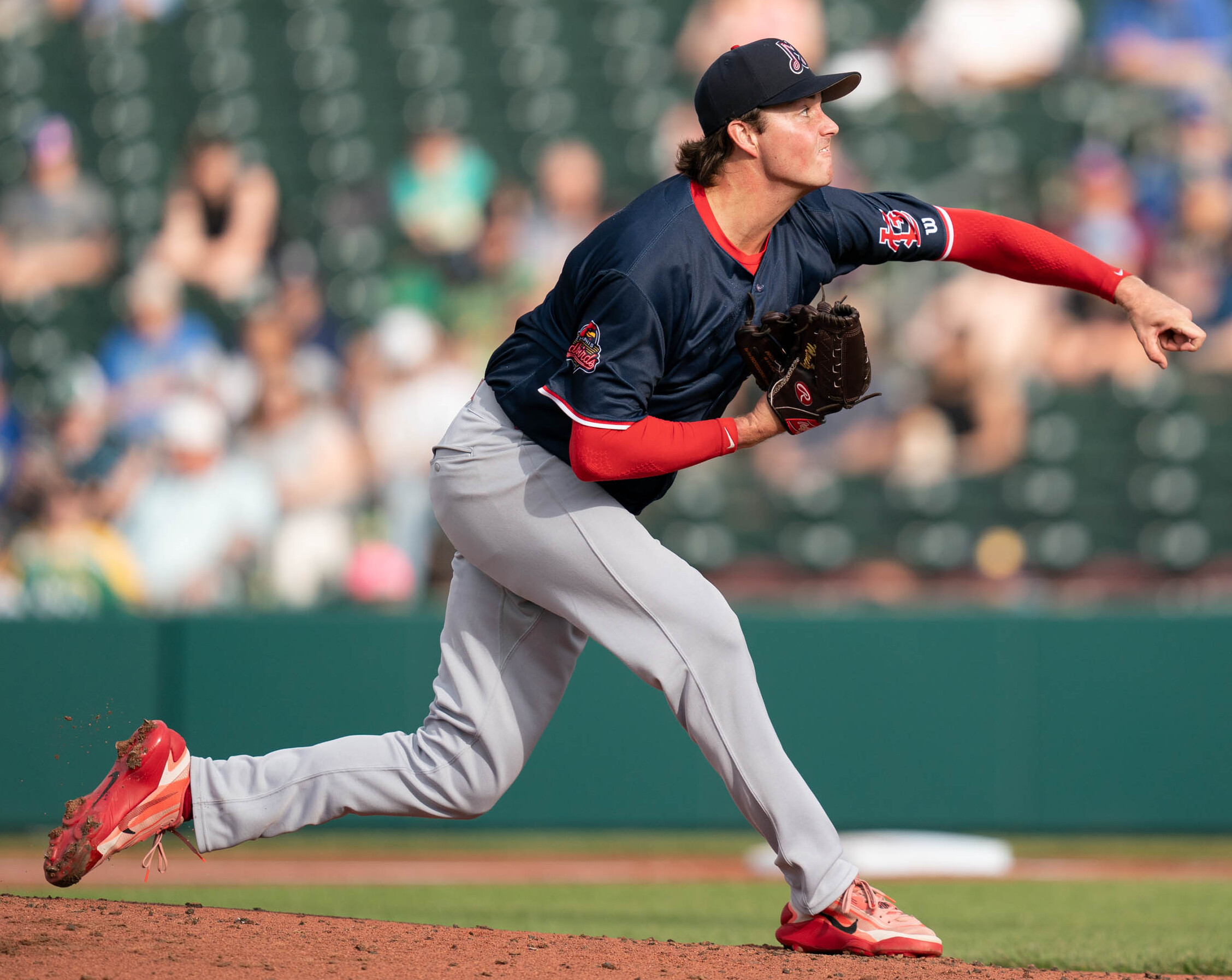
- Mautz with the Memphis Redbirds in 2026

St. Louis Cardinals – No. 52
- Pitcher
- Born: July 17, 2001 (age 25); San Diego, California, U.S.
- Bats: Left Throws: Left

MLB debut
- May 25, 2026, for the St. Louis Cardinals

MLB statistics (through 2026 season)
- Win–loss record: 0–1
- Earned run average: 5.87
- Strikeouts: 19
- Stats at Baseball Reference

Teams
- St. Louis Cardinals (2026–present)

Brycen Alexander Mautz (born July 17, 2001) is an American professional baseball pitcher for the St. Louis Cardinals of Major League Baseball (MLB). He made his MLB debut in 2026.

== Amateur career ==
Mautz attended Westview High School in San Diego, California, and the University of San Diego, where he played college baseball for the San Diego Toreros as a walk-on.

In 2021, Mautz played summer collegiate ball with the Waterloo Bucks of the Northwoods League.

== Professional career ==
The St. Louis Cardinals selected Mautz in the second round (59th overall) of the 2022 Major League Baseball draft.

Mautz made his professional debut in 2023 with the Single-A Palm Beach Cardinals. In 2024, he played with the High-A Peoria Chiefs. Mautz made 25 starts for the Double-A Springfield Cardinals in 2025, posting an 8-3 record and 2.98 ERA with 134 strikeouts across 114 2/3 innings pitched. On November 18, 2025, the Cardinals added Mautz to their 40-man roster to protect him from the Rule 5 draft. Mautz was optioned to the Triple-A Memphis Redbirds to begin the 2026 season.

On May 24, 2026, the Cardinals promoted Mautz to the major leagues to make his MLB debut against the Cincinnati Reds. The game was subsequently rained out and postponed. He made his MLB debut the following day, tossing three innings of relief against the Milwaukee Brewers.
