= Masyn Winn =

American baseball player (born 2002)

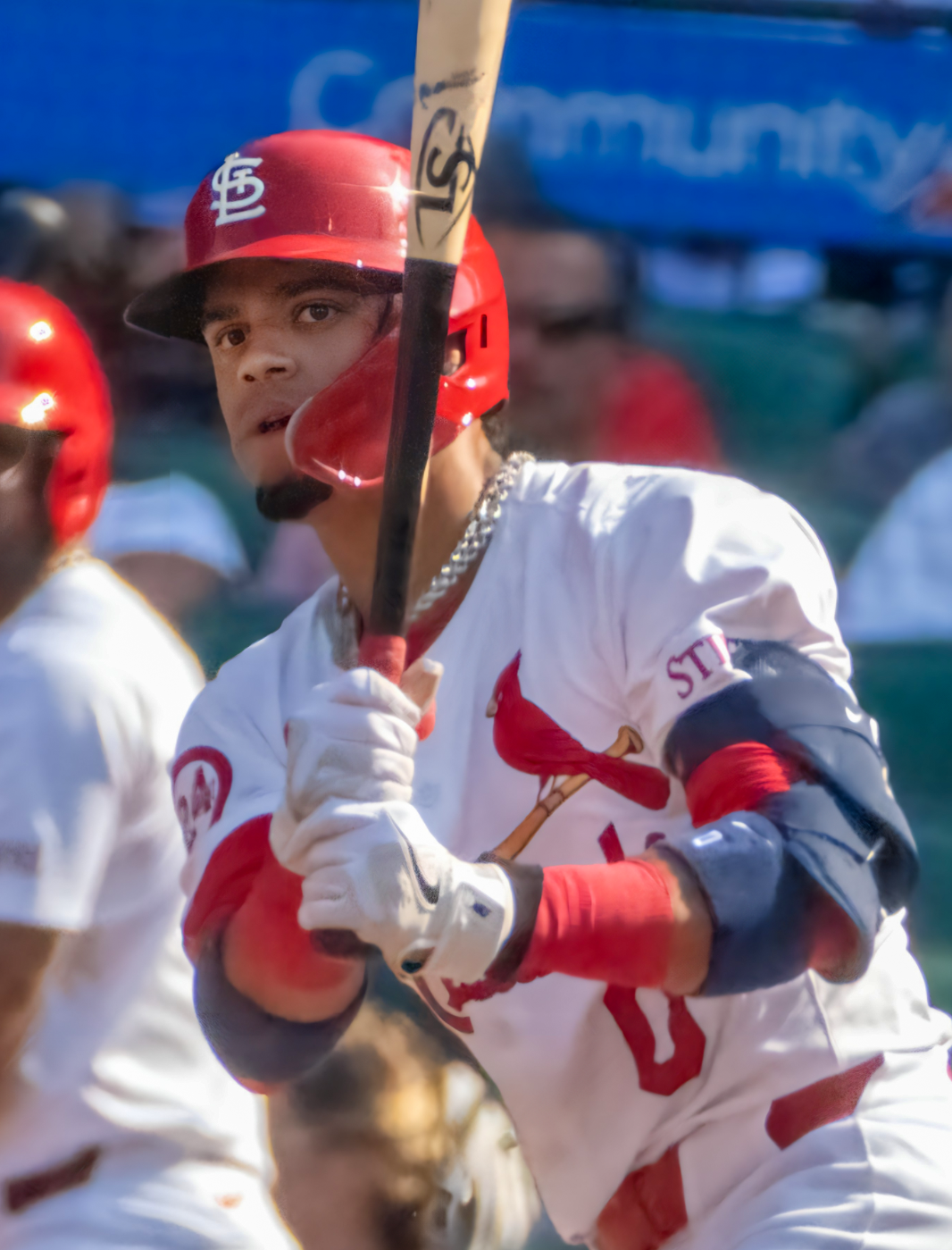
- Winn batting for the St. Louis Cardinals in 2024

St. Louis Cardinals – No. 0
- Shortstop
- Born: March 21, 2002 (age 24); Katy, Texas, U.S.
- Bats: Right Throws: Right

MLB debut
- August 18, 2023, for the St. Louis Cardinals

MLB statistics (through 2026 season)
- Batting average: .246
- Home runs: 31
- Runs batted in: 176
- Stats at Baseball Reference

Teams
- St. Louis Cardinals (2023–present)

Career highlights and awards
- Gold Glove Award (2025)

Masyn Blaze Winn (born March 21, 2002) is an American professional baseball shortstop for the St. Louis Cardinals of Major League Baseball (MLB).

Winn was selected by St. Louis in the second round of the 2020 MLB draft. He played in their minor league system before making his MLB debut in 2023. Winn became the team's starting shortstop in 2024 and was awarded his first Gold Glove Award in 2025.

== Amateur career ==
Winn was born in Katy, Texas, and grew up in Kingwood, Texas, where he attended Kingwood High School. After his freshman year, was named to USA Baseball's under-15 National Team and played in the COPABE Pan American AA Championships, where he batted .522 and was named the tournament MVP. He committed to play college baseball at the University of Arkansas.

As a junior at Kingwood in 2019, Winn had a 13–0 record on the mound with a 0.67 ERA and 117 strikeouts over 76 1/3 innings pitched while also hitting .417 with eight home runs and 46 RBIs, earning the title of District 22-6A MVP. Winn was suspended for the first 12 games of his senior year in 2020 due to an infraction of team rules and played in only one game before the season was cancelled due to the COVID-19 pandemic.

== Professional career ==
=== Minor leagues ===
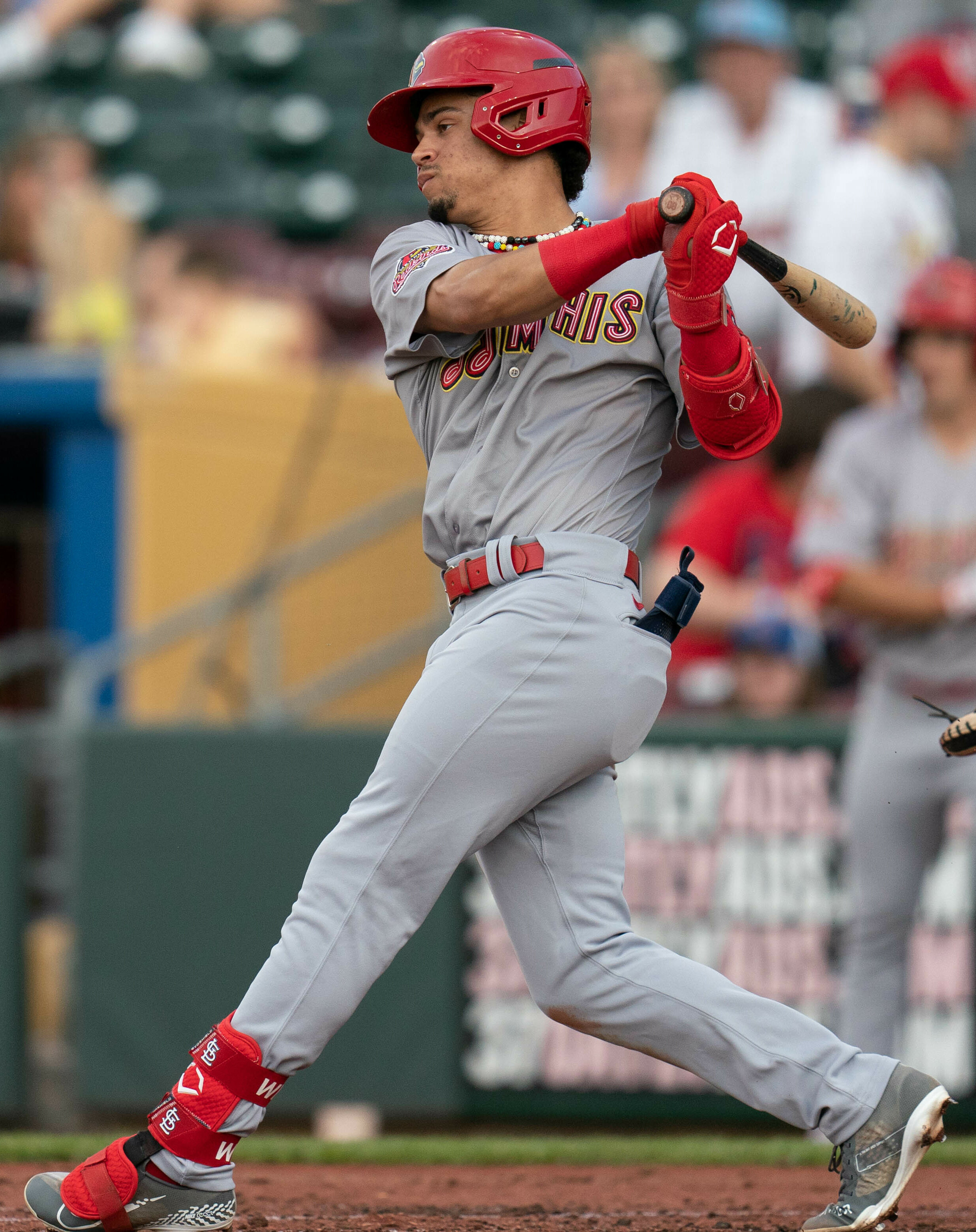
Winn with the Memphis Redbirds 2023

The St. Louis Cardinals selected Winn in the second round of the 2020 Major League Baseball draft. He signed with the team for a $2.1 million bonus as a two-way player. Winn was named the best overall athlete in the Cardinals' minor league system going into the 2021 season. To begin the 2021 season, he was assigned to the Palm Beach Cardinals of the Low-A Southeast, where he began his professional career as a shortstop. After slashing .262/.370/.388 with three home runs, 34 RBI, 15 doubles, three triples, and 16 stolen bases over 61 games, he was promoted to the Peoria Chiefs of the High-A Central in late July. Over 36 games with Peoria, he hit .209/.240/.304 with two home runs, 10 RBI, and 16 stolen bases. He pitched a total of one inning for the 2021 season.

Winn returned to Peoria begin the 2022 season. After hitting .349/.404/.566 with one home run, 15 RBI, and 15 stolen bases over 33 games, he was promoted to the Springfield Cardinals of the Double-A Texas League. He was selected to represent the Cardinals alongside Jordan Walker at the 2022 All-Star Futures Game. Over 86 games with Springfield to end the season, he slashed .258/.349/.432 with 11 home runs, 48 RBI, 25 doubles, and 28 stolen bases. His season totals over 119 games between both teams included a .283 batting average, 12 home runs, 63 RBI, 36 doubles, and 43 stolen bases. He was selected to play in the Arizona Fall League for the Salt River Rafters after the season.

To begin the 2023 season, Winn was assigned to the Memphis Redbirds Triple-A International League. In 105 games for Memphis, he hit .288/.359/.474 with 18 home runs, 61 RBI, and 17 stolen bases. He won the International League Top MLB Prospect Award.

=== Major leagues ===
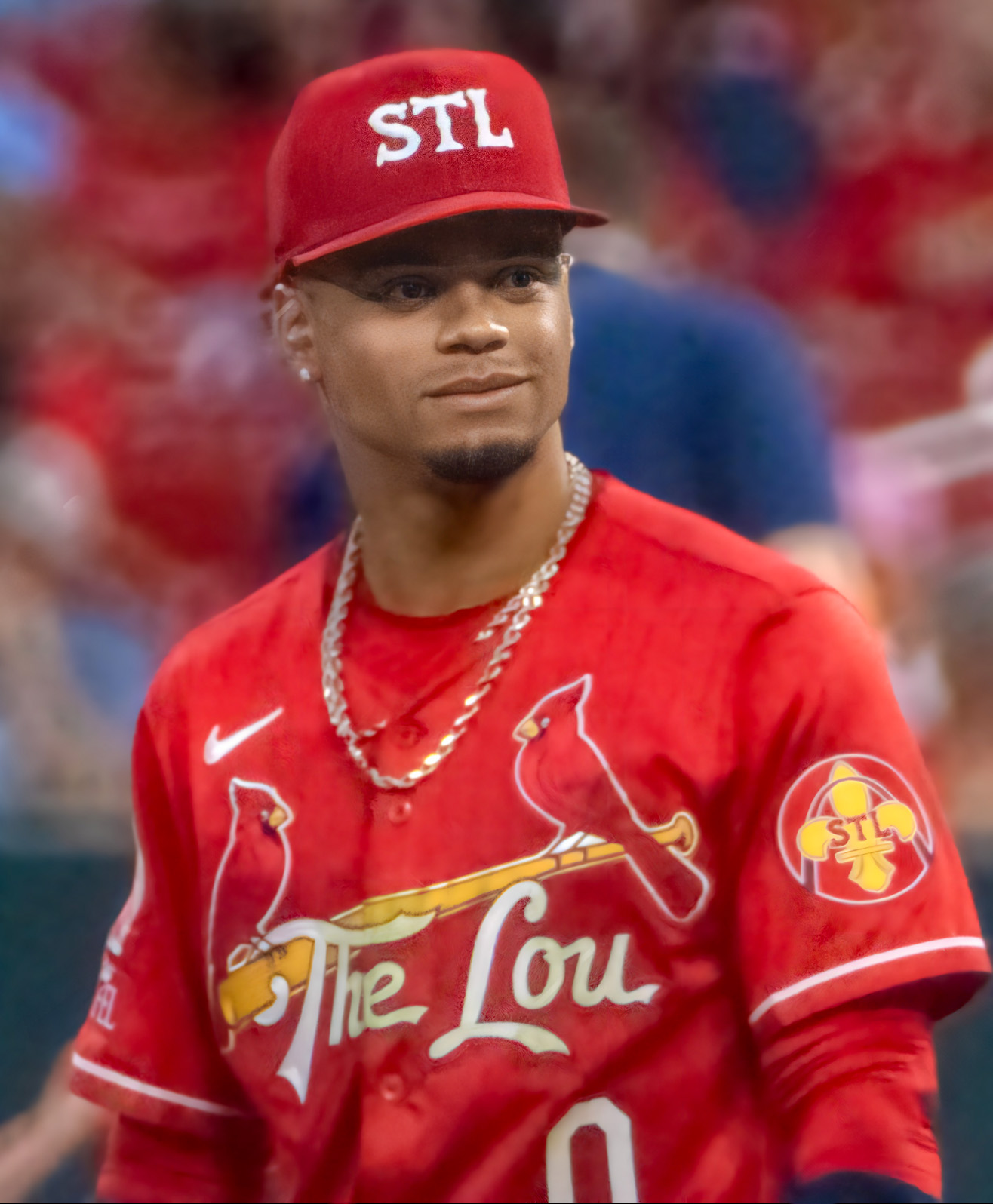
Cardinals shortstop Masyn Winn 2024

==== 2023 season ====
On August 18, 2023, Winn was selected to the 40-man roster and promoted to the major leagues for the first time. He was inserted into the lineup that evening, making a diving play on a ground ball in the second inning and getting his first hit, an infield single, going 1-for-4 in his first game. At the age of 21 years and 150 days old, he became the youngest Cardinals player to make his MLB debut at the starting shortstop position since Garry Templeton (20 years, 138 days) on August 9, 1976. He hit his first MLB home run on September 6, a solo home run off of Darius Vines of the Atlanta Braves. Winn played in 37 games for the Cardinals to end the season, batting .172 with two home runs and 12 RBI.

==== 2024 season ====
Winn opened the 2024 season as the team's starting shortstop, quickly establishing himself as a premier defender at the shortstop position, finishing second in all of Major League Baseball in Defensive fWAR. He was one of three finalists for the National League Gold Glove Award at shortstop. For 2024 season, Winn slashed .267/.314/.416 with 15 home runs and 57 RBI over 150 games.

==== 2025 season ====
Winn returned as the Cardinals' starting shortstop. On April 13, he was placed on the injured list with a back injury. He rehabbed with Memphis, and was activated ten days later. On September 10, it was announced that Winn had been playing through a meniscus tear for months, but would be attempting to play through the injury until the season's end. However, three days later, Winn was placed on the injured list and ruled out for the season; in 129 appearances for St. Louis on the year, he batted .253/.310/.363 with nine home runs, 51 RBI, and nine stolen bases. On November 2, Winn was awarded his first career Gold Glove Award for National League shortstops.

==== 2026 season ====
Winn was placed on the injured list on August 25 with a left thumb fracture, and returned to play on September 9. He played in 136 games and batted .232 with five home runs and 56 RBI.

== Personal life ==
Winn grew up a Houston Astros fan.
