= Luis Gastélum =

Mexican baseball player (born 2001)

St. Louis Cardinals – No. 72
- Pitcher
- Born: September 27, 2001 (age 25); Los Mochis, Mexico
- Bats: Right Throws: Right

MLB debut
- July 8, 2026, for the St. Louis Cardinals

MLB statistics (through 2026 season)
- Win–loss record: 5–4
- Earned run average: 4.42
- Strikeouts: 44
- Stats at Baseball Reference

Teams
- St. Louis Cardinals (2026–present)

Luis Enrique Gastélum (born September 27, 2001) is a Mexican professional baseball pitcher for the St. Louis Cardinals of Major League Baseball (MLB). He debuted in MLB in 2026.

== Professional career ==
Gastélum played with the Cañeros de Los Mochis of the Mexican Pacific League from 2021 to 2023. He signed with the St. Louis Cardinals in April 2023.

Gastélum made his Cardinals organization debut in 2023 with the Florida Complex League Cardinals and also played with the Palm Beach Cardinals. He repeated with the two clubs in 2024. In 2025, he played the entirety of the season with the Springfield Cardinals and had a 3–5 record, a 4.02 ERA and 92 strikeouts across 62 2/3 innings pitched. He was assigned to the Memphis Redbirds to begin the 2026 season.

On July 8, 2026, the Cardinals selected Gastélum's contract and promoted him to the major leagues for the first time. At the time of his promotion, he had a 7–1 record and a 2.27 ERA over 36 relief appearances. Gastélum made his major league debut later that day.

== International career ==
Gastélum was selected to play for the Mexico national baseball team at the 2026 World Baseball Classic.
