= Nathan Church =

American baseball player (born 2000)

St. Louis Cardinals – No. 27
- Outfielder
- Born: July 12, 2000 (age 26); Newport Beach, California, U.S.
- Bats: Left Throws: Left

MLB debut
- August 17, 2025, for the St. Louis Cardinals

MLB statistics (through 2026 season)
- Batting average: .239
- Home runs: 11
- Runs batted in: 58
- Stats at Baseball Reference

Teams
- St. Louis Cardinals (2025–present)

Nathan Michael Church (born July 12, 2000) is an American professional baseball outfielder for the St. Louis Cardinals of Major League Baseball (MLB). He made his MLB debut in 2025.

== Amateur career ==
Church attended El Toro High School in Lake Forest, California, where he was teammates with Paul Skenes. He played college baseball at the University of California, Irvine for the Anteaters. As a junior in 2022, he hit .309 with five home runs and 38 RBI over 53 games.

== Professional career ==
Church was selected by the St. Louis Cardinals in the 11th round of the 2022 Major League Baseball draft and signed for $125,000. After signing with St. Louis, Church made his professional debut with the Palm Beach Cardinals, hitting .189 over 27 games. He was assigned to the Peoria Chiefs for the 2023 season and batted .279 with three home runs, 44 RBI, and 21 stolen bases over 119 games. He spent the 2024 season with the Springfield Cardinals, batting .268 with nine home runs, 66 RBI, and 24 stolen bases over 127 games. Following the season's end, he was assigned to play in the Arizona Fall League with the Glendale Desert Dogs.

Church was assigned to Springfield to open the 2025 season and was promoted to the Triple-A Memphis Redbirds in early June. He was named the Texas League Player of the Month in May for his performance with Springfield. In 53 appearances for Memphis, Church had a .335/.400/.521 slash line with seven home runs, 30 RBI, and nine stolen bases. On August 17, 2025, Church was selected to the 40-man roster and promoted to the major leagues for the first time. He made his MLB debut that night at Busch Stadium versus the New York Yankees, starting in center field and going hitless over four at-bats. He recorded both his first hit and first MLB home run on August 22 versus Adrian Houser of the Tampa Bay Rays at George M. Steinbrenner Field. Church played in 27 games for the Cardinals and hit .179 with one home run and eight RBI.

Church made the Cardinals' Opening Day roster in 2026. He started in left field for the Cardinals on Opening Day versus the Tampa Bay Rays. On May 22, Church was placed on the injured list with a left shoulder strain, and he was activated on June 9. He played the entirety of the season with St. Louis as the team's starting center fielder, and ended the season with a .247/.290/.365 slash line with 10 home runs, 50 RBI, 17 doubles, and 10 stolen bases in 15 attempts.
