= Quinn Mathews =

American baseball player (born 2000)

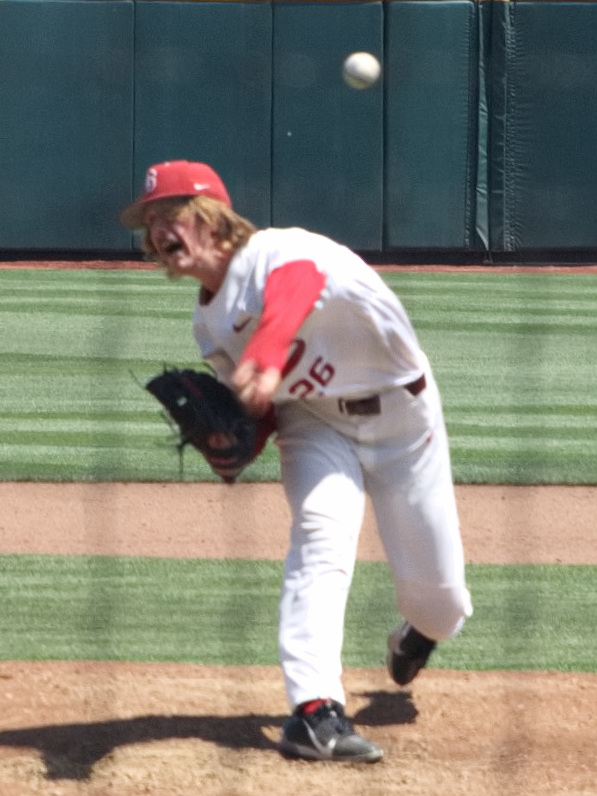
- Mathews with Stanford in the 2021 College World Series

St. Louis Cardinals – No. 60
- Pitcher
- Born: October 4, 2000 (age 26); Mission Viejo, California, U.S.
- Bats: Left Throws: Left

MLB debut
- August 1, 2026, for the St. Louis Cardinals

MLB statistics (through 2026 season)
- Win–loss record: 2–4
- Earned run average: 3.83
- Strikeouts: 46
- Stats at Baseball Reference

Teams
- St. Louis Cardinals (2026–present)

Quinn Jack Mathews (born October 4, 2000) is an American professional baseball pitcher for the St. Louis Cardinals of Major League Baseball (MLB). He made his MLB debut in 2026.

== Amateur career ==
Mathews attended Aliso Niguel High School in Aliso Viejo, California where he played baseball. He went unselected in the 2019 Major League Baseball draft and enrolled at Stanford University where he played college baseball.

As a freshman for Stanford in 2020, Mathews pitched 21 innings before the season was cancelled due to the COVID-19 pandemic. For the 2021 season, Mathews went 5–2 with a 6.08 ERA over 66 2/3 innings. That summer, he played in the Cape Cod Baseball League with the Cotuit Kettleers. With Stanford in 2022, Mathews appeared in 27 games and went 9–2 with a 3.08 ERA and 111 strikeouts over 99 1/3 innings. He was selected by the Tampa Bay Rays in the 19th round of the 2022 Major League Baseball draft but did not sign. For the 2023 season, Mathews went 10–4 with a 3.75 ERA and 158 strikeouts over 124 1/3 innings and was named the Pac-12 Conference Pitcher of the Year. In a Super Regional game versus the Texas Longhorns, he threw a 156-pitch complete game in which he struck out 16 batters in an 8-3 Stanford win.

== Professional career ==
After the 2023 collegiate season, Mathews was selected by the St. Louis Cardinals in the fourth round (122nd overall) of the 2023 Major League Baseball draft. He signed with the team for $600,000.

Mathews made his professional debut in 2024 with the Palm Beach Cardinals and was named the Cardinals' Minor League Pitcher of the Month for April. In mid-May, he was promoted to the Peoria Chiefs, and in mid-June, he was promoted again, to the Springfield Cardinals. He was selected (alongside Tink Hence) to represent the Cardinals at the 2024 All-Star Futures Game at Globe Life Field. In late August, he was promoted to the Memphis Redbirds. Over 26 starts between the four clubs, Mathews went 8–5 with a 2.76 ERA and 202 strikeouts over 143 1/3 innings. His 202 strikeouts were most in the minor leagues.

Mathews missed the beginning of the 2025 due to shoulder soreness. He made two rehab starts for the Florida Complex League Cardinals and Palm Beach before being assigned to Memphis. Over 22 starts with Memphis, Mathews went 4–7 with a 3.93 ERA and 107 strikeouts over 94 innings. Mathews returned to Memphis to begin the 2026 season.

On July 30, 2026, Cardinals manager Oliver Marmol announced that Mathews would be promoted to make his MLB debut. He had made 19 starts with Memphis and pitched to a 5–3 record, a 3.13 ERA, and 111 strikeouts across 92 innings. Mathews had his contract formally selected for the 40-man and active rosters on August 1. He made his MLB debut that day as the Cardinals' starting pitcher versus the Toronto Blue Jays and gave up two earned runs on six hits, three walks, and three strikeouts across five innings. His first MLB strikeout was of Kazuma Okamoto. On August 28, Mathews earned his first MLB win against the Pittsburgh Pirates after pitching 5 2/3 innings in which he gave up one earned run on five hits, one walk, and seven strikeouts. Mathews ended the 2026 season with a 2–4 record, a 3.83 ERA, and 46 strikeouts over 49 1/3 innings.
