= Hunter Dobbins =

American baseball player (born 1999)

St. Louis Cardinals – No. 40
- Pitcher
- Born: August 30, 1999 (age 27); Bryan, Texas, U.S.
- Bats: Right Throws: Right

MLB debut
- April 6, 2025, for the Boston Red Sox

MLB statistics (through 2026 season)
- Win–loss record: 7–4
- Earned run average: 3.91
- Strikeouts: 97
- Stats at Baseball Reference

Teams
- Boston Red Sox (2025); St. Louis Cardinals (2026–present)

Hunter Dobbins (born August 30, 1999) is an American professional baseball pitcher for the St. Louis Cardinals of Major League Baseball (MLB). He has previously played in MLB for the Boston Red Sox.

== Career ==
=== Boston Red Sox ===
Dobbins attended Rudder High School in Bryan, Texas, and Texas Tech University, where he played college baseball for the Texas Tech Red Raiders. He missed his entire junior season in 2021 after undergoing Tommy John surgery. He was selected by the Boston Red Sox in the eighth round of the 2021 Major League Baseball draft.

Dobbins split the 2024 season between the Double-A Portland Sea Dogs and Triple-A Worcester Red Sox, compiling an 8–5 record and 3.08 earned run average (ERA) with 120 strikeouts across 125 2/3 innings pitched. Following the season, the Red Sox added Dobbins to their 40-man roster to protect him from the Rule 5 draft.

Dobbins was optioned to Triple-A Worcester to begin the 2025 season. The Red Sox recalled Dobbins on April 6 to serve as the team's 27th player during a doubleheader against the St. Louis Cardinals. He made his major-league debut that evening, as the Red Sox's starting pitcher, and earned the win. After the game, he was returned to Triple-A. Dobbins had another one day return to the big league club in April, before being called up as a regular on May 2. With injuries to the Red Sox' pitching staff, Dobbins was pressed into service as a starter. During a game on July 11 against the Tampa Bay Rays, Dobbins tore his right ACL when he stepped on first base after fielding a ground ball hit by Chandler Simpson, ending his season.

=== St. Louis Cardinals ===
On December 21, 2025, Dobbins was traded to the St. Louis Cardinals alongside prospects Yhoiker Fajardo and Blake Aita in exchange for Willson Contreras. He made 11 appearances (including eight starts) for St. Louis during the 2026 campaign, compiling a 3–3 record and 3.67 ERA with 52 strikeouts and one save across 54 innings of work. On September 2, 2026, Dobbins underwent season–ending surgery to repair the ulnar collateral ligament and flexor tendon in his right elbow.

== Personal life ==
Before making his first appearance against the Yankees, as the starting pitcher for a game at Yankee Stadium, Hunter Dobbins said, “My dad was a diehard Red Sox fan. And I’ve said it before, that if the Yankees were the last team to give me a contract, I’d retire.” Dobbins explained that he grew up rooting for the Red Sox, but more out of a natural hatred for the Yankees. In the same interview, Dobbins told reporters that his father, Lance Dobbins, had been drafted by the Yankees, had pitched in the Arizona Diamondbacks' organization and was friends with Andy Pettitte. Subsequent reporting revealed that all of those claims were false. Dobbins told reporters, "The whole backstory is stuff I heard growing up and seen pictures of from my dad... But at the end of the day I don't go and fact-check my dad or anything like that." In reality, Lance Dobbins pitched in independent baseball in 1996 and 1997 for the Meridian Brakemen of the Big South League and Ohio Valley Redcoats of the Frontier League.
