= Leo Bernal =

Panamanian baseball player (born 2004)

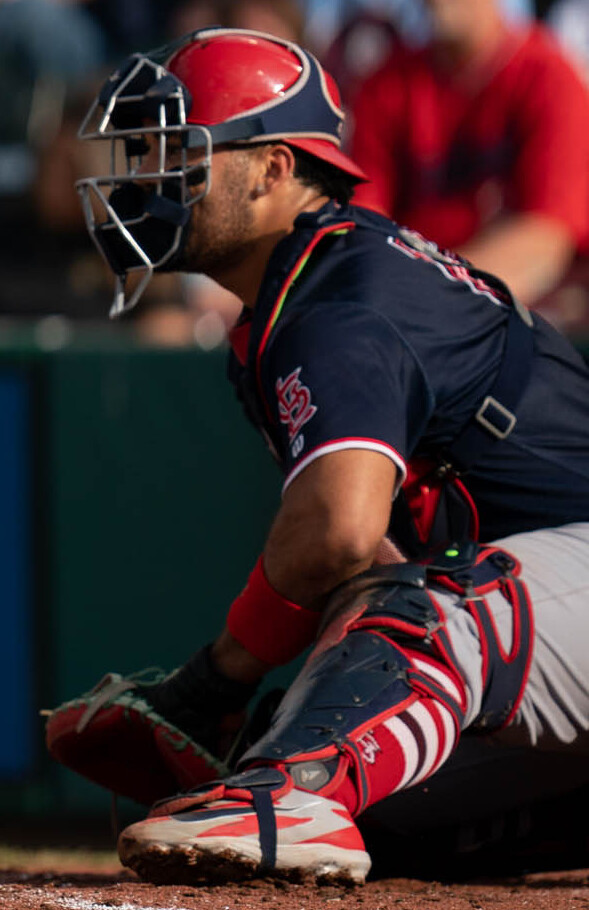
- Bernal with the Memphis Redbirds in 2026

St. Louis Cardinals – No. 13
- Catcher
- Born: February 13, 2004 (age 22); Panama City, Panama
- Bats: Switch Throws: Right

MLB debut
- September 1, 2026, for the St. Louis Cardinals

MLB statistics (through 2026 season)
- Batting average: .284
- Home runs: 5
- Runs batted in: 21
- Stats at Baseball Reference

Teams
- St. Louis Cardinals (2026–present)

Leonardo Abdiel Bernal (born February 13, 2004) is a Panamanian professional baseball catcher for the St. Louis Cardinals of Major League Baseball (MLB). He made his MLB debut in 2026.

== Career ==
Bernal signed with the St. Louis Cardinals as an international free agent in January 2021. He received a $680,000 signing bonus. He made his professional debut that year with the Rookie-level Dominican Summer League Cardinals with whom he hit .209 with five home runs across 44 games. He played 2022 and 2023 with the Single-A Palm Beach Cardinals, batting .256 with seven home runs in 2022 and .265 with three home runs in 2023.

In 2024, Bernal played with the High-A Peoria Chiefs and Double-A Springfield Cardinals. Across 110 games between both teams, he hit .262 with 11 home runs and 57 RBI. After the season, he played in the Arizona Fall League for the Glendale Desert Dogs. Bernal returned to Springfield for the 2025 season with whom he had a .247/.332/.394 slash line with 13 home runs, 70 RBI, and 13 stolen bases across 107 games. On November 18, 2025, the Cardinals added Bernal to their 40-man roster to protect him from the Rule 5 draft.

Bernal was optioned to the Triple-A Memphis Redbirds to begin the 2026 season. Across 101 games, Bernal had a .278 batting average with 16 home runs and 77 RBI.

On September 1, Bernal was promoted to the major leagues for the first time. He made his MLB debut that night and recorded his first hit, a two-run single off Los Angeles Dodgers pitcher Eric Lauer, in a 13-8 Cardinals win. Bernal hit his first MLB home run the next day, a two-run home run, off Dodgers starting pitcher Yoshinobu Yamamoto. He finished the season batting .284 with five home runs and 21 RBI across 24 games.
