= Ramón Urías =

Mexican baseball player (born 1994)

Free agent
- Infielder
- Born: June 3, 1994 (age 32); Magdalena de Kino, Sonora, Mexico
- Bats: Right Throws: Right

MLB debut
- August 20, 2020, for the Baltimore Orioles

MLB statistics (through 2026 season)
- Batting average: .253
- Home runs: 54
- Runs batted in: 224
- Stats at Baseball Reference

Teams
- Baltimore Orioles (2020–2025); Houston Astros (2025); St. Louis Cardinals (2026)

Career highlights and awards
- Gold Glove Award (2022)

Ramón Francisco Urías Figueroa (born June 3, 1994) is a Mexican professional baseball infielder who is a free agent. He has previously played in Major League Baseball (MLB) for the Baltimore Orioles, Houston Astros, and St. Louis Cardinals. Primarily a third baseman, he is noted for his defense and versatility of which he plays at all four infield positions.

== Career ==
=== Texas Rangers ===
Urías signed with the Texas Rangers as an international free agent on December 6, 2010. He made his professional debut in 2011 with the Dominican Summer League Rangers, batting .213 with one home run and 13 RBI over 49 games. In 2012, Urías returned to the DSL where he batted .268/.346/.342 with one home run and 36 RBI in 56 games.

=== Diablos Rojos del México ===
On May 7, 2013, the Rangers loaned Urías to Diablos Rojos del México of the Mexican League. In 12 games for the team, he went 3-for-10 (.300) with three RBI. Urías made 85 appearances for the Diablos on 2014, slashing .262/.341/.416 with six home runs, 39 RBI, and four stolen bases. Urías appeared in 106 contests for the team in 2015, batting .351/.410/.496 with 10 home runs, 55 RBI, and 12 stolen bases. He made 43 appearances for México in 2016, hitting .301/.418/.382 with 20 RBI and six stolen bases. In 2017, Urías slashed .340/.433/.577 with 19 home runs and 79 RBI over 106 games for the Diablos.

=== St. Louis Cardinals ===
On March 16, 2018, Urías signed a minor league contract with the St. Louis Cardinals organization. He began the season with the Double-A Springfield Cardinals before being promoted to the Triple-A Memphis Redbirds. In 90 games between the two affiliates, Urías hit .300/.356/.516 with 13 home runs and 44 RBI.

The Cardinals added Urías to their 40-man roster after the 2018 season, in order to protect him from the Rule 5 draft. Urías returned to Memphis to begin 2019, and also spent time with Springfield and the High-A Palm Beach Cardinals. In 103 appearances split between the three affiliates, he batted a cumulative .262/.362/.419 with 10 home runs and 55 RBI. Urías was designated for assignment by the Cardinals on February 6, 2020, following the acquisition of Ricardo Sánchez.

=== Baltimore Orioles ===
Urías was claimed off waivers by the Baltimore Orioles on February 11, 2020. On August 18, Urías was promoted to the major leagues for the first time. Urías made his major league debut on August 20 against the Boston Red Sox, striking out in his only plate appearance. In 25 at-bats in his rookie season for the Orioles, Urías slashed .360/.407/.560 with a home run and three RBI. In 2021, Urías appeared in 262 at-bats for the Orioles and slashed .279/.361/.412 with seven home runs and 38 RBI.

Urías became the team's' primary third baseman for the 2022 season. In 403 at-bats, he slashed .248/.305/.414 with 16 home runs and 51 RBI. Urías managed a 3.6 WAR for 2022, and hit his first career triple on September 27 against the Boston Red Sox. In the same game, Urías hit 3-for-3 and was on track to hit for the cycle for the first time in his career before exiting the game on a knee sprain injury that placed him on the 10-day IL and ended his season early. Urías won the Gold Glove Award for American League third basemen.

Urías made 116 appearances for the Orioles during the 2023 season, batting .264/.328/.375 with four home runs and 42 RBI. Urías achieved a career-high five RBI in a 12–10 home loss to the Boston Red Sox on August 16, 2024. He played in 100 games for Baltimore during the regular season, slashing .254/.322/.423 with 11 home runs and 37 RBI.

Urías made 77 appearances for the Orioles during the 2025 season, hitting .248/.300/.388 with eight home runs, 34 RBI, and two stolen bases.

=== Houston Astros ===
On July 31, 2025, the Orioles traded Urías to the Houston Astros in exchange for Twine Palmer. In 35 appearances for Houston, Urías batted .223/.267/.372 with three home runs, 10 RBI, and one stolen base. Urias was designated for assignment by the Astros on November 18. On November 21, he was non-tendered by Houston and became a free agent.

=== St. Louis Cardinals (second stint) ===
On February 21, 2026, Urías signed a one-year, $2 million contract with the St. Louis Cardinals. Urías was placed on the injured list on May 5 due to right elbow lateral epicondylitis; however, on June 7, it was reported that Urías was dealing with a left elbow issue. He was transferred to the 60-day injured list on June 12. Urías was activated from the injured list on August 23. He made 43 total appearances for St. Louis, batting .151/.260/.326 with four home runs and nine RBI. Urías was designated for assignment by the Cardinals on September 16. He was released by the team two days later.

== Personal life ==
He is the older brother of Luis Urías, also an MLB infielder.
