= 2025 St. Louis Cardinals season =

Major League Baseball season

2025 St. Louis Cardinals
- League: National League
- Division: Central
- Ballpark: Busch Stadium
- City: St. Louis, Missouri
- Record: 78–84 (.481)
- Divisional place: 4th
- Owners: William DeWitt Jr.
- President: Bill DeWitt III
- Managers: Oliver Marmol
- Television: FanDuel Sports Network Midwest (Chip Caray, Tom Ackerman, Brad Thompson, Al Hrabosky, Rick Ankiel, Jim Hayes, Scott Warmann, Alexa Datt, Tom Pagnozzi, Mark Sweeney)
- Radio: KMOX NewsRadio 1120; St. Louis Cardinals Radio Network (John Rooney, Rick Horton, Mike Claiborne)
- Stats: ESPN.com; Baseball Reference

The 2025 St. Louis Cardinals season was the 144th season for the St. Louis Cardinals, a Major League Baseball franchise in St. Louis, Missouri. It was the 134th season for the Cardinals in the National League and their 20th at Busch Stadium III. On September 24, the Cardinals were eliminated from postseason contention for the third consecutive season.

For the first time since 2018, Paul Goldschmidt was not on the roster, as he signed with the Yankees in free agency.

After the season, longtime President of Baseball Operations John Mozeliak stepped down and Chaim Bloom took over.

The St. Louis Cardinals drew an average home attendance of 27,777, the 19th-highest of all MLB teams.

== Season standings ==
=== National League Central ===
NL Central
Team	W	L	Pct.	GB	Home	Road
Milwaukee Brewers	97	65	.599	—	52‍–‍29	45‍–‍36
Chicago Cubs	92	70	.568	5	50‍–‍31	42‍–‍39
Cincinnati Reds	83	79	.512	14	45‍–‍36	38‍–‍43
St. Louis Cardinals	78	84	.481	19	44‍–‍37	34‍–‍47
Pittsburgh Pirates	71	91	.438	26	44‍–‍37	27‍–‍54

=== National League Wild Card ===
Division leaders
Team	W	L	Pct.
Milwaukee Brewers	97	65	.599
Philadelphia Phillies	96	66	.593
Los Angeles Dodgers	93	69	.574

Wild Card teams (Top 3 teams qualify for postseason)
Team	W	L	Pct.	GB
Chicago Cubs	92	70	.568	+9
San Diego Padres	90	72	.556	+7
Cincinnati Reds	83	79	.512	—
New York Mets	83	79	.512	—
San Francisco Giants	81	81	.500	2
Arizona Diamondbacks	80	82	.494	3
Miami Marlins	79	83	.488	4
St. Louis Cardinals	78	84	.481	5
Atlanta Braves	76	86	.469	7
Pittsburgh Pirates	71	91	.438	12
Washington Nationals	66	96	.407	17
Colorado Rockies	43	119	.265	40

=== Record vs. opponents ===
==== Record vs. National League ====
2025 National League record Source: MLB Standings Grid – 2025
Team	AZ	ATL	CHC	CIN	COL	LAD	MIA	MIL	NYM	PHI	PIT	SD	SF	STL	WSH	AL
Arizona	—	4–2	3–4	2–4	8–5	6–7	3–3	4–3	3–3	3–3	2–4	5–8	7–6	3–3	2–4	25–23
Atlanta	2–4	—	2–4	5–2	4–2	1–5	8–5	2–4	8–5	5–8	2–4	1–6	1–5	4–2	9–4	22–26
Chicago	4–3	4–2	—	5–8	5–1	4–3	4–2	7–6	2–4	2–4	10–3	3–3	1–5	8–5	3–3	30–18
Cincinnati	4–2	2–5	8–5	—	5–1	1–5	3–4	5–8	4–2	3–3	7–6	4–2	3–3	6–7	2–4	26–22
Colorado	5–8	2–4	1–5	1–5	—	2–11	3–3	2–4	0–6	0–7	2–4	3–10	2–11	4–2	4–3	12–36
Los Angeles	7–6	5–1	3–4	5–1	11–2	—	5–1	0–6	3–4	2–4	2–4	9–4	9–4	2–4	3–3	27–21
Miami	3–3	5–8	2–4	4–3	3–3	1–5	—	3–3	7–6	4–9	4–3	3–3	4–2	3–3	7–6	26–22
Milwaukee	3–4	4–2	6–7	8–5	4–2	6–0	3–3	—	4–2	4–2	10–3	2–4	2–5	7–6	6–0	28–20
New York	3–3	5–8	4–2	2–4	6–0	4–3	6–7	2–4	—	7–6	2–4	2–4	4–2	5–2	7–6	24–24
Philadelphia	3–3	8–5	4–2	3–3	7–0	4–2	9–4	2–4	6–7	—	3–3	3–3	3–4	2–4	8–5	31–17
Pittsburgh	4–2	4–2	3–10	6–7	4–2	4–2	3–4	3–10	4–2	3–3	—	1–5	4–2	7–6	4–3	17–31
San Diego	8–5	6–1	3–3	2–4	10–3	4–9	3–3	4–2	4–2	3–3	5–1	—	10–3	4–3	4–2	20–28
San Francisco	6–7	5–1	5–1	3–3	11–2	4–9	2–4	5–2	2–4	4–3	2–4	3–10	—	2–4	3–3	24–24
St. Louis	3–3	2–4	5–8	7–6	2–4	4–2	3–3	6–7	2–5	4–2	6–7	3–4	4–2	—	5–1	22–26
Washington	4–2	4–9	3–3	4–2	3–4	3–3	6–7	0–6	6–7	5–8	3–4	2–4	3–3	1–5	—	19–29

Updated with the results of all games through September 28, 2025.

==== Record vs. American League ====
2025 National League record vs. American League Source: MLB Standings
Team	ATH	BAL	BOS	CWS	CLE	DET	HOU	KC	LAA	MIN	NYY	SEA	TB	TEX	TOR
Arizona	2–1	2–1	2–1	2–1	2–1	0–3	0–3	1–2	1–2	2–1	2–1	3–0	1–2	4–2	1–2
Atlanta	1–2	0–3	3–3	2–1	3–0	3–0	1–2	1–2	1–2	3–0	1–2	1–2	1–2	0–3	1–2
Chicago	3–0	2–1	2–1	5–1	3–0	1–2	1–2	1–2	3–0	1–2	2–1	1–2	2–1	2–1	1–2
Cincinnati	0–3	2–1	1–2	1–2	5–1	2–1	1–2	2–1	2–1	2–1	2–1	1–2	3–0	1–2	1–2
Colorado	1–2	1–2	0–3	1–2	1–2	0–3	2–4	0–3	2–1	2–1	1–2	0–3	1–2	0–3	0–3
Los Angeles	2–1	1–2	1–2	3–0	2–1	3–0	0–3	2–1	0–6	2–1	2–1	3–0	2–1	2–1	2–1
Miami	1–2	2–1	1–2	1–2	1–2	2–1	1–2	2–1	2–1	2–1	3–0	1–2	3–3	3–0	1–2
Milwaukee	2–1	2–1	3–0	2–1	1–2	2–1	2–1	2–1	3–0	4–2	0–3	2–1	1–2	0–3	2–1
New York	2–1	1–2	1–2	2–1	0–3	2–1	1–2	2–1	3–0	1–2	3–3	2–1	0–3	1–2	3–0
Philadelphia	2–1	2–1	2–1	1–2	2–1	2–1	0–3	2–1	1–2	2–1	2–1	3–0	3–0	3–0	4–2
Pittsburgh	2–1	0–3	2–1	0–3	0–3	4–2	1–2	0–3	2–1	1–2	1–2	0–3	1–2	1–2	2–1
San Diego	2–1	0–3	2–1	2–1	3–0	1–2	1–2	2–1	2–1	1–2	1–2	1–5	0–3	2–1	0–3
San Francisco	5–1	2–1	2–1	1–2	1–2	0–3	3–0	1–2	1–2	0–3	2–1	3–0	1–2	2–1	0–3
St. Louis	2–1	2–1	0–3	3–0	3–0	1–2	2–1	3–3	1–2	3–0	0–3	0–3	1–2	1–2	0–3
Washington	1–2	5–1	0–3	1–2	1–2	2–1	1–2	1–2	2–1	2–1	0–3	2–1	0–3	1–2	0–3

Updated with the results of all games through September 28, 2025.

== Game log ==
The Cardinals released their 2025 schedule on July 18, 2024. For one of the few times in the past dozen years, the Cardinals opened the regular season at home for 2025, hosting the Minnesota Twins on Opening Day, March 27, at Busch Stadium, in its 20th season. They visited the oldest MLB-regular season stadium, Boston's Fenway Park (1912) on April 4–6, before their first National League series on April 7–9 at Pittsburgh. The season ended with a September 26–28 weekend at the second-oldest MLB-regular season stadium, Chicago's Wrigley Field (1914).

Legend
Cardinals Win	Cardinals Loss	Game postponed	Eliminated from playoff race
Boldface text denotes a Cardinals pitcher

2025 St. Louis Cardinals Game Log: 78–84 (Home: 44–37; Away: 34–47)
March/April: 14–17 (Home: 10–5; Away: 4–12)

#	Date	Opponent	Score	Win	Loss	Save	Attendance	Record	Box / Streak
1	March 27	Twins	5–3	**Gray** (1–0)	López (0–1)	**Helsley** (1)	47,398	1–0	W1
2	March 29	Twins	5–1	**Fedde** (1–0)	Alcalá (0–1)	—	30,712	2–0	W2
3	March 30	Twins	9–2	**Pallante** (1–0)	Ober (0–1)	**Matz** (1)	26,923	3–0	W3
4	March 31	Angels	4–5 (10)	Burke (1–0)	**Romero** (0–1)	Johnson (1)	21,206	3–1	L1
5	April 1	Angels	7–9 (11)	Johnson (1–0)	**Roycroft** (0–1)	Zeferjahn (1)	21,306	3–2	L2
6	April 2	Angels	12–5	**Romero** (1–1)	Anderson (0–1)	—	20,309	4–2	W1
7	April 4	@ Red Sox	9–13	Buehler (1–1)	**Fedde** (1–1)	Chapman (2)	36,462	4–3	L1
―	April 5	@ Red Sox	Postponed (rain); Makeup: April 6						
8	April 6 (1)	@ Red Sox	4–5 (10)	Chapman (2–0)	**Fernandez** (0–1)	—	31,495	4–4	L2
9	April 6 (2)	@ Red Sox	7–18	Dobbins (1–0)	**Mikolas** (0–1)	Criswell (1)	28,276	4–5	L3
10	April 7	@ Pirates	4–8	Mlodzinski (1–1)	**Liberatore** (0–1)	Harrington (1)	8,250	4–6	L4
11	April 8	@ Pirates	5–3	**Gray** (2–0)	Skenes (1–1)	**Maton** (1)	8,291	5–6	W1
12	April 9	@ Pirates	1–2 (13)	Lawrence (1–0)	**Roycroft** (0–2)	—	8,430	5–7	L1
13	April 11	Phillies	2–0	**Pallante** (2–0)	Nola (0–3)	**Helsley** (2)	32,309	6–7	W1
14	April 12	Phillies	1–4	Sánchez (1–0)	**Mikolas** (0–2)	Alvarado (3)	30,791	6–8	L1
15	April 13	Phillies	7–0	**Liberatore** (1–1)	Wheeler (1–1)	—	32,509	7–8	W1
16	April 14	Astros	8–3	**Gray** (3–0)	Valdez (1–2)	—	21,977	8–8	W2
17	April 15	Astros	0–2	Brown (2–1)	**Fedde** (1–2)	Hader (4)	22,285	8–9	L1
18	April 16	Astros	4–1	**Matz** (1–0)	Blanco (1–2)	**Helsley** (3)	30,360	9–9	W1
19	April 17	@ Mets	1–4	Canning (2–1)	**Pallante** (2–1)	Díaz (4)	38,246	9–10	L1
20	April 18	@ Mets	4–5	Brazobán (1–0)	**Fernandez** (0–2)	—	39,627	9–11	L2
21	April 19	@ Mets	0–3	Senga (3–1)	**Liberatore** (1–2)	Díaz (5)	42,339	9–12	L3
22	April 20	@ Mets	4–7	Buttó (2–0)	**Romero** (1–2)	—	38,347	9–13	L4
23	April 21	@ Braves	6–7	Hernández (2–0)	**Maton** (0–1)	—	30,180	9–14	L5
24	April 22	@ Braves	10–4	**Matz** (2–0)	De Los Santos (1–1)	—	35,876	10–14	W1
25	April 23	@ Braves	1–4	Hernández (3–0)	**Romero** (1–3)	—	34,009	10–15	L1
26	April 25	Brewers	3–2	**Liberatore** (2–2)	Patrick (1–2)	**Helsley** (4)	24,437	11–15	W1
27	April 26	Brewers	6–5	**Helsley** (1–0)	Megill (0–2)	—	35,316	12–15	W2
28	April 27	Brewers	1–7	Quintana (4–0)	**Fedde** (1–3)	—	32,403	12–16	L1
29	April 28	@ Reds	1–3	Martinez (1–3)	**Pallante** (2–2)	Pagán (8)	15,147	12–17	L2
―	April 29	@ Reds	Postponed (rain); Makeup: April 30						
30	April 30 (1)	@ Reds	6–0	**Mikolas** (1–2)	Singer (4–1)	—	15,709	13–17	W1
31	April 30 (2)	@ Reds	9–1	**Graceffo** (1–0)	Petty (0–1)	—	13,550	14–17	W2

May: 19–7 (Home: 9–3; Away: 10–4)

#	Date	Opponent	Score	Win	Loss	Save	Attendance	Record	Box / Streak
32	May 1	@ Reds	1–9	Ashcraft (2–2)	**Liberatore** (2–3)	—	15,513	14–18	L1
33	May 2	Mets	3–9	Holmes (4–1)	**Gray** (3–1)	—	27,966	14–19	L2
―	May 3	Mets	Postponed (rain); Makeup: May 4						
34	May 4 (1)	Mets	6–5	**Fedde** (2–3)	Tidwell (0–1)	**Helsley** (5)	37,735	15–19	W1
35	May 4 (2)	Mets	5–4	**McGreevy** (1–0)	Kranick (2–1)	—	30,313	16–19	W2
36	May 5	Pirates	6–3	**Graceffo** (2–0)	Shugart (1–2)	**Helsley** (6)	22,369	17–19	W3
37	May 6	Pirates	2–1	**Liberatore** (3–3)	Skenes (3–4)	**Graceffo** (1)	25,307	18–19	W4
38	May 7	Pirates	5–0	**Gray** (4–1)	Keller (1–4)	—	27,453	19–19	W5
39	May 9	@ Nationals	10–0	**Fedde** (3–3)	Parker (3–3)	—	27,849	20–19	W6
40	May 10	@ Nationals	4–2	**Pallante** (3–2)	Williams (2–4)	**Helsley** (7)	37,796	21–19	W7
41	May 11	@ Nationals	6–1	**Mikolas** (2–2)	Gore (2–4)	—	20,585	22–19	W8
42	May 12	@ Phillies	3–2	**Leahy** (1–0)	Strahm (1–2)	**Helsley** (8)	42,513	23–19	W9
–	May 13	@ Phillies	Postponed (rain); Makeup: May 14 as a split double-header						
43	May 14 (1)	@ Phillies	1–2	Luzardo (4–0)	**Matz** (2–1)	Romano (4)	40,773	23–20	L1
44	May 14 (2)	@ Phillies	14–7	**Roycroft** (1–2)	Nola (1–7)	—	35,150	24–20	W1
45	May 16	@ Royals	10–3	**Pallante** (4–2)	Ragans (2–3)	—	28,104	25–20	W2
46	May 17	@ Royals	1–0	**Mikolas** (3–2)	Cameron (1–1)	**Helsley** (9)	36,139	26–20	W3
47	May 18	@ Royals	1–2	Erceg (1–0)	**Roycroft** (1–3)	Estévez (13)	25,695	26–21	L1
48	May 19	Tigers	11–4	**Gray** (5–1)	Guenther (0–1)	—	24,817	27–21	W1
49	May 20	Tigers	4–5	Vest (4–0)	**Leahy** (1–1)	Kahnle (6)	31,766	27–22	L1
50	May 21	Tigers	1–5	Lee (1–0)	**Pallante** (4–3)	—	28,990	27–23	L2
51	May 23	Diamondbacks	4–3	**Mikolas** (4–2)	Gallen (3–6)	**Helsley** (10)	34,214	28–23	W1
52	May 24	Diamondbacks	6–5	**Helsley** (2–0)	Martínez (1–2)	—	37,380	29–23	W2
53	May 25	Diamondbacks	4–3	**King** (1–0)	Ginkel (0–2)	**Maton** (2)	36,437	30–23	W3
54	May 26	@ Orioles	2–5	Morton (1–7)	**Fedde** (3–4)	Bautista (8)	21,717	30–24	L1
55	May 27	@ Orioles	7–4	**Matz** (3–1)	Baker (3–1)	**Helsley** (11)	13,779	31–24	W1
56	May 28	@ Orioles	6–4	**King** (2–0)	Povich (1–4)	**Helsley** (12)	14,491	32–24	W2
57	May 30	@ Rangers	1–11	Leiter (4–2)	**Liberatore** (3–4)	Boushley (1)	28,679	32–25	L1
58	May 31	@ Rangers	2–0	**Gray** (6–1)	Corbin (3–4)	**Helsley** (13)	29,062	33–25	W1

June: 14–14 (Home: 7–9; Road: 7–5)

#	Date	Opponent	Score	Win	Loss	Save	Attendance	Record	Streak/ box
59	June 1	@ Rangers	1–8	deGrom (5–2)	**Fedde** (3–5)	—	28,138	33–26	L1
60	June 3	Royals	7–10	Cruz (2–0)	**Matz** (3–2)	Estévez (17)	26,656	33–27	L2
―	June 4	Royals	Postponed (rain); Makeup: June 5						
61	June 5 (1)	Royals	6–5 (10)	**Romero** (2–3)	Estévez (2–1)	—	21,657	34–27	W1
62	June 5 (2)	Royals	5–7	Zerpa (3–0)	**Liberatore** (3–5)	Estévez (18)	31,038	34–28	L1
63	June 6	Dodgers	5–0	**Gray** (7–1)	Wrobleski (1–2)	—	40,071	35–28	W1
64	June 7	Dodgers	2–1	**Helsley** (3–0)	Casparius (4–1)	—	37,465	36–28	W2
65	June 8	Dodgers	3–7	Kershaw (1–0)	**McGreevy** (1–1)	—	42,255	36–29	L1
66	June 9	Blue Jays	4–5 (10)	Rodríguez (1–0)	**Maton** (0–2)	Hoffman (16)	30,851	36–30	L2
67	June 10	Blue Jays	9–10	Bassitt (7–3)	**Mikolas** (4–3)	Hoffman (17)	29,278	36–31	L3
68	June 11	Blue Jays	2–5	Turnbull (1–0)	**Liberatore** (3–6)	Rodríguez (1)	28,530	36–32	L4
69	June 12	@ Brewers	0–6	Misiorowski (1–0)	**Gray** (7–2)	Ashby (1)	27,687	36–33	L5
70	June 13	@ Brewers	2–3	Peralta (6–4)	**Fedde** (3–6)	Megill (14)	30,026	36–34	L6
71	June 14	@ Brewers	8–5	**Leahy** (2–1)	Quintana (4–2)	—	39,017	37–34	W1
72	June 15	@ Brewers	2–3	Priester (5–2)	**Mikolas** (4–4)	Megill (15)	40,629	37–35	L1
73	June 17	@ White Sox	12–2	**Liberatore** (4–6)	Smith (3–4)	—	16,974	38–35	W1
–	June 18	@ White Sox	Postponed (rain); Makeup: June 19						
74	June 19 (1)	@ White Sox	5–4	**Granillo** (1–0)	Booser (1–4)	**Helsley** (14)	see 2nd game	39–35	W2
75	June 19 (2)	@ White Sox	8–6 (10)	**Romero** (3–3)	Altavilla (0–1)	**Granillo** (1)	20,816	40–35	W3
76	June 20	Reds	6–1	**Pallante** (5–3)	Singer (7–5)	—	35,334	41–35	W4
77	June 21	Reds	6–5 (11)	**Maton** (1–2)	Petty (0–3)	—	27,283	42–35	W5
78	June 22	Reds	1–4	Abbott (7–1)	**Mikolas** (4–5)	Pagán (18)	27,477	42–36	L1
79	June 23	Cubs	8–2	**Liberatore** (5–6)	Brown (4–6)	—	27,058	43–36	W1
80	June 24	Cubs	8–7	**Matz** (4–2)	Taillon (7–5)	**Helsley** (15)	29,545	44–36	W2
81	June 25	Cubs	0–8	Boyd (7–3)	**Fedde** (3–7)	—	30,399	44–37	L1
82	June 26	Cubs	0–3	Imanaga (4–2)	**Pallante** (5–4)	Palencia (8)	32,793	44–38	L2
83	June 27	@ Guardians	5–0	**Gray** (8–2)	Ortiz (4–9)	—	34,787	45–38	W1
84	June 28	@ Guardians	9–6	**Svanson** (1–0)	Festa (1–2)	**Helsley** (16)	32,484	46–38	W2
85	June 29	@ Guardians	7–0	**Liberatore** (6–6)	Allen (5–6)	—	27,935	47–38	W3
86	June 30	@ Pirates	0–7	Heaney (4–7)	**Fedde** (3–8)	—	12,387	47–39	L1

July: 8–16 (Home: 6–7; Road: 2–9)

#	Date	Opponent	Score	Win	Loss	Save	Attendance	Record	Streak/ box
87	July 1	@ Pirates	0–1	Mattson (2–0)	**Maton** (1–3)	Bednar (12)	19,631	47–40	L2
88	July 2	@ Pirates	0–5	Keller (3–10)	**Gray** (8–3)	—	15,979	47–41	L3
89	July 4	@ Cubs	3–11	Rea (6–3)	**Mikolas** (4–6)	—	40,038	47–42	L4
90	July 5	@ Cubs	8–6	**Matz** (5–2)	Keller (3–1)	**Helsley** (17)	40,119	48–42	W1
91	July 6	@ Cubs	0–11	Boyd (9–3)	**Fedde** (3–9)	—	40,319	48–43	L1
92	July 8	Nationals	4–2	**Gray** (9–3)	Irvin (7–4)	**Helsley** (18)	20,658	49–43	W1
93	July 9	Nationals	2–8	Gore (4–8)	**Pallante** (5–5)	—	20,956	49–44	L1
94	July 10	Nationals	8–1	**Mikolas** (5–6)	Soroka (3–7)	—	21,141	50–44	W1
95	July 11	Braves	5–6	De Los Santos (3–2)	**Liberatore** (6–7)	Iglesias (10)	29,625	50–45	L1
96	July 12	Braves	6–7	Hernández (4–1)	**Helsley** (3–1)	Iglesias (11)	31,807	50–46	L2
97	July 13	Braves	5–4	**Graceffo** (3–0)	Chavez (0–1)	**Helsley** (19)	26,959	51–46	W1
July 15 **95th All-Star Game in Cumberland, Georgia**
98	July 18	@ Diamondbacks	3–7	Pfaadt (10–6)	**Pallante** (5–6)	—	31,938	51–47	L1
99	July 19	@ Diamondbacks	1–10	Nelson (6–2)	**Gray** (9–4)	—	42,817	51–48	L2
100	July 20	@ Diamondbacks	3–5	Kelly (9–5)	**Mikolas** (5–7)	DeSclafani (2)	31,288	51–49	L3
101	July 21	@ Rockies	6–2	**McGreevy** (2–1)	Gomber (0–4)	—	27,707	52–49	W1
102	July 22	@ Rockies	4–8	Blalock (1–2)	**Fedde** (3–10)	—	30,137	52–50	L1
103	July 23	@ Rockies	0–6	Gordon (2–2)	**Pallante** (5–7)	—	27,711	52–51	L2
104	July 24	Padres	9–7	**Gray** (10–4)	Darvish (0–3)	**Helsley** (20)	30,601	53–51	W1
105	July 25	Padres	3–0	**Mikolas** (6–7)	Pivetta (10–3)	**Helsley** (21)	29,297	54–51	W2
106	July 26	Padres	1–3	Estrada (4–4)	**Liberatore** (6–8)	Suárez (30)	25,699	54–52	L1
107	July 27	Padres	2–9	Kolek (4–5)	**McGreevy** (2–2)	—	26,080	54–53	L2
108	July 28	Marlins	7–1	**Pallante** (6–7)	Cabrera (4–5)	—	20,510	55–53	W1
109	July 29	Marlins	0–5	Alcántara (6–9)	**Gray** (10–5)	—	20,523	55–54	L1
110	July 30	Marlins	0–2	Quantrill (4–8)	**Mikolas** (6–8)	Faucher (10)	20,813	55–55	L2

August: 13–15 (Home: 5–8; Road: 8–7)

#	Date	Opponent	Score	Win	Loss	Save	Attendance	Record	Streak/ box
111	August 1	@ Padres	1–4	Pivetta (11–3)	**Liberatore** (6–9)	Suárez (31)	45,933	55–56	L3
112	August 2	@ Padres	8–5	**McGreevy** (3–2)	Vásquez (3–5)	**Romero** (1)	44,553	56–56	W1
113	August 3	@ Padres	3–7	Cease (4–10)	**Pallante** (6–8)	Suárez (32)	44,709	56–57	L1
114	August 4	@ Dodgers	3–2	**O'Brien** (1–0)	Stewart (2–2)	**Romero** (2)	46,628	57–57	W1
115	August 5	@ Dodgers	6–12	Sheehan (3–2)	**Mikolas** (6–9)	—	50,477	57–58	L1
116	August 6	@ Dodgers	5–3	**Romero** (4–3)	Vesia (2–1)	**O'Brien** (1)	44,621	58–58	W1
117	August 8	Cubs	5–0	**McGreevy** (4–2)	Boyd (11–5)	—	33,453	59–58	W2
118	August 9	Cubs	1–9	Rea (9–5)	**Pallante** (6–9)	—	40,048	59–59	L1
119	August 10	Cubs	3–2	**Gray** (11–5)	Imanaga (8–5)	**Romero** (3)	30,540	60–59	W1
120	August 11	Rockies	3–2	**Leahy** (3–1)	Mejía (1–1)	—	20,836	61–59	W2
121	August 12	Rockies	0–3	Freeland (3–12)	**Liberatore** (6–10)	Vodnik (3)	20,807	61–60	L1
122	August 13	Rockies	5–6	Herget (1–2)	**Romero** (4–4)	Vodnik (4)	20,513	61–61	L2
123	August 15	Yankees	3–4	Gil (1–1)	**Pallante** (6–10)	Bednar (19)	31,169	61–62	L3
124	August 16	Yankees	8–12	Fried (13–5)	**Gray** (11–6)	Bednar (20)	33,800	61–63	L4
125	August 17	Yankees	4–8	Weaver (3–3)	**Romero** (4–5)	—	25,365	61–64	L5
126	August 18	@ Marlins	8–3	**Svanson** (2–0)	Bachar (5–1)	—	8,555	62–64	W1
127	August 19	@ Marlins	7–4	**McGreevy** (5–2)	Cabrera (6–7)	**O'Brien** (2)	7,612	63–64	W2
128	August 20	@ Marlins	2–6	Alcántara (7–11)	**Pallante** (6–11)	—	9,304	63–65	L1
129	August 22	@ Rays	7–4	**Gray** (12–6)	Boyle (1–3)	**Romero** (4)	9,182	64–65	W1
130	August 23	@ Rays	6–10	Houser (7–4)	**Mikolas** (6–10)	—	10,046	64–66	L1
131	August 24	@ Rays	2–7	Pepiot (9–10)	**Liberatore** (6–11)	—	8,809	64–67	L2
132	August 25	Pirates	7–6	**O'Brien** (2–0)	Santana (4–5)	—	17,675	65–67	W1
133	August 26	Pirates	3–8	Keller (6–12)	**Pallante** (6–12)	—	18,602	65–68	L1
134	August 27	Pirates	1–2	Chandler (1–0)	**Gray** (12–7)	Santana (10)	19,836	65–69	L2
135	August 28	Pirates	4–1	**Leahy** (4–1)	Ramírez (1–2)	**Romero** (5)	18,894	66–69	W1
136	August 29	@ Reds	7–5 (10)	**Svanson** (3–0)	Santillan (1–5)	**Fernandez** (1)	21,587	67–69	W2
137	August 30	@ Reds	4–2	**McGreevy** (6–2)	Abbott (8–5)	**Leahy** (1)	32,076	68–69	W3
138	August 31	@ Reds	4–7	Singer (12–9)	**Pallante** (6–13)	Pagán (26)	27,238	68–70	L1

September: 10–14 (Home: 7–5; Road: 3–9)

#	Date	Opponent	Score	Win	Loss	Save	Attendance	Record	Streak/ box
139	September 1	Athletics	3–11	Morales (3–0)	**Gray** (12–8)	—	22,670	68–71	L2
140	September 2	Athletics	2–1	**Mikolas** (7–10)	Kelly (4–3)	**Romero** (6)	17,002	69–71	W1
141	September 3	Athletics	5–1	**Liberatore** (7–11)	Springs (10–10)	**Romero** (7)	17,516	70–71	W2
142	September 5	Giants	2–8	Seymour (1–2)	**McGreevy** (6–3)	Beck (1)	25,837	70–72	L1
143	September 6	Giants	3–2	**O'Brien** (3–0)	Walker (5–5)	—	26,085	71–72	W1
144	September 7	Giants	4–3	**Gray** (13–8)	Teng (2–4)	**O'Brien** (3)	29,923	72–72	W2
145	September 8	@ Mariners	2–4	Woo (13–7)	**Graceffo** (3–1)	Muñoz (33)	22,899	72–73	L1
146	September 9	@ Mariners	3–5	Ferguson (4–4)	**Liberatore** (7–12)	Muñoz (34)	23,044	72–74	L2
147	September 10	@ Mariners	2–4 (13)	Hancock (4–5)	**Fernandez** (0–3)	—	25,495	72–75	L3
148	September 12	@ Brewers	2–8	Priester (13–2)	**Pallante** (6–14)	—	40,525	72–76	L4
149	September 13	@ Brewers	8–9 (10)	Uribe (3–2)	**Leahy** (4–2)	—	41,807	72–77	L5
150	September 14	@ Brewers	3–2	**Mikolas** (8–10)	Quintana (11–7)	**O'Brien** (4)	42,269	73–77	W1
151	September 15	Reds	6–11	Phillips (3–0)	**Fernandez** (0–4)	—	18,095	73–78	L1
152	September 16	Reds	3–0	**McGreevy** (7–3)	Abbott (9–7)	**O'Brien** (5)	21,848	74–78	W1
153	September 17	Reds	2–6	Singer (14–10)	**Pallante** (6–15)	—	23,462	74–79	L1
154	September 19	Brewers	7–1	**Gray** (14–8)	Misiorowski (5–3)	—	29,752	75–79	W1
155	September 20	Brewers	2–3 (10)	Koenig (6–1)	**Romero** (4–6)	—	36,212	75–80	L1
156	September 21	Brewers	5–1	**Liberatore** (8–12)	Gasser (0–1)	—	32,723	76–80	W1
157	September 22	@ Giants	6–5	**McGreevy** (8–3)	Verlander (3–11)	**Romero** (8)	31,301	77–80	W2
158	September 23	@ Giants	9–8	**Svanson** (4–0)	Walker (5–7)	**O'Brien** (6)	37,012	78–80	W3
159	September 24	@ Giants	3–4	Buttó (5–3)	**O'Brien** (3–1)	Beck (2)	32,409	78–81	L1
160	September 26	@ Cubs	1–12	Rea (11–7)	**Mikolas** (8–11)	—	35,611	78–82	L2
161	September 27	@ Cubs	3–7	Taillon (11–7)	**McGreevy** (8–4)	—	38,035	78–83	L3
162	September 28	@ Cubs	0–2	Assad (4–1)	**King** (2–1)	Wicks (1)	37,497	78–84	L4

== Roster ==
2025 St. Louis Cardinals
Roster
Pitchers: 56 Jorge Alcalá; 12 Erick Fedde; 64 Ryan Fernandez; 44 Gordon Graceffo; 65 Andre Granillo; 54 Sonny Gray; 56 Ryan Helsley; 47 John King; 62 Kyle Leahy; 52 Matthew Liberatore; 88 Phil Maton; 32 Steven Matz; 36 Michael McGreevy; 39 Miles Mikolas; 35 Roddery Muñoz; 55 Riley O'Brien; 53 Andre Pallante; 70 Nick Raquet; 59 JoJo Romero; 58 Chris Roycroft; 49 Matt Svanson; 67 Anthony Veneziano	Catchers: 8 Jimmy Crooks; 48 Iván Herrera; 43 Pedro Pagés; 63 Yohel Pozo; Infielders: 28 Nolan Arenado; 26 Luken Baker; 27 Jose Barrero; 40 Willson Contreras; 33 Brendan Donovan; 15 José Fermín; 16 Nolan Gorman; 31 César Prieto; 25 Thomas Saggese; 0 Masyn Winn	Outfielders: 41 Alec Burleson; 27 Nathan Church; 13 Garrett Hampson; 21 Lars Nootbaar; 11 Victor Scott II; 22 Michael Siani; 13 Ryan Vilade; 18 Jordan Walker	Manager: 37 Oliver Marmol; Coaches: 87 Brandon Allen (assistant hitting); 90 Dusty Blake (pitching); 73 Brant Brown (hitting); 82 Stubby Clapp (first base); 34 Daniel Descalso (bench); 86 Packy Elkins (game planning); 19 Jon Jay (assistant coach); 89 Dean Kiekhefer (assistant pitching); 94 Jamie Pogue (assistant coach/bullpen); 74 Julio Rangel (assistant pitching/bullpen); 76 Kleininger Teran (bullpen catcher); 75 Ron 'Pop' Warner (third base)

== Player stats ==
= Indicates team leader

=== Batting ===
Note: G = Games played; AB = At bats; R = Runs scored; H = Hits; 2B = Doubles; 3B = Triples; HR = Home runs; RBI = Runs batted in; SB = Stolen bases; BB = Walks; AVG = Batting average; SLG = Slugging average

Player	G	AB	R	H	2B	3B	HR	RBI	SB	BB	AVG	SLG
Lars Nootbaar	135	509	68	119	24	1	13	48	4	64	.234	.361
Alec Burleson	139	497	54	144	26	2	18	69	5	39	.290	.459
Masyn Winn	129	491	72	124	27	0	9	51	9	34	.253	.363
Willson Contreras	135	490	70	126	31	1	20	80	5	44	.257	.447
Brendan Donovan	118	460	64	132	32	0	10	50	3	42	.287	.422
Nolan Arenado	107	401	48	95	18	1	12	52	3	28	.237	.377
Victor Scott II	138	398	54	86	15	1	5	37	34	42	.216	.296
Iván Herrera	107	388	54	110	13	0	19	66	8	43	.284	.464
Jordan Walker	111	363	40	78	13	1	6	41	10	29	.215	.306
Pedro Pagés	112	361	38	83	15	0	11	45	0	19	.230	.363
Nolan Gorman	111	351	48	72	14	1	14	46	1	47	.205	.370
Thomas Saggese	82	275	25	71	16	0	2	25	3	16	.258	.338
Yohel Pozo	67	160	16	37	8	0	5	19	0	7	.231	.375
José Fermín	30	60	5	17	5	0	1	9	2	8	.283	.417
Nathan Church	27	56	9	10	1	0	1	8	1	3	.179	.250
Jimmy Crooks	15	45	3	6	0	1	1	1	0	0	.133	.244
Luken Baker	19	34	3	8	3	0	0	2	0	7	.235	.324
Garrett Hampson	35	29	9	3	1	0	0	1	1	1	.103	.138
Jose Barrero	22	29	4	4	1	0	1	3	0	1	.138	.276
Michael Siani	19	17	4	4	0	0	0	0	0	2	.235	.235
Ryan Vilade	7	13	1	1	0	0	0	0	0	2	.077	.077
César Prieto	3	6	0	1	0	0	0	0	0	0	.167	.167
Totals	162	5433	689	1331	263	9	148	653	89	478	.245	.378

Source:Baseball Reference

=== Pitching ===
Note: W = Wins; L = Losses; ERA = Earned run average; G = Games pitched; GS = Games started; SV = Saves; IP = Innings pitched; H = Hits allowed; R = Runs allowed; ER = Earned runs allowed; BB = Walks allowed; SO = Strikeouts

Player	W	L	ERA	G	GS	SV	IP	H	R	ER	BB	SO
Sonny Gray	14	8	4.28	32	32	0	180.2	185	93	86	38	201
Andre Pallante	6	15	5.31	31	31	0	162.2	173	109	96	62	111
Miles Mikolas	8	11	4.84	31	31	0	156.1	169	87	84	37	100
Matthew Liberatore	8	12	4.21	29	29	0	151.2	158	79	71	40	122
Erick Fedde	3	10	5.22	20	20	0	101.2	106	62	59	47	63
Michael McGreevy	8	4	4.42	17	16	0	95.2	100	50	47	20	58
Kyle Leahy	4	2	3.07	62	1	1	88.0	80	32	30	28	80
JoJo Romero	4	6	2.07	65	0	8	61.0	47	21	14	29	55
Matt Svanson	4	0	1.94	39	0	0	60.1	33	14	13	20	68
Steven Matz	5	2	3.44	32	2	1	55.0	56	25	21	9	47
John King	2	1	4.66	51	0	0	48.1	65	30	25	14	28
Riley O'Brien	3	1	2.06	42	0	6	48.0	33	13	11	22	45
Gordon Graceffo	3	1	6.28	26	0	1	43.0	50	33	30	13	40
Phil Maton	1	3	2.35	40	0	2	38.1	28	12	10	15	48
Ryan Helsley	3	1	3.00	36	0	21	36.0	36	12	12	14	41
Ryan Fernandez	0	4	7.71	32	0	1	30.1	36	30	26	16	34
Andre Granillo	1	0	4.71	14	0	1	21.0	22	11	11	7	18
Chris Roycroft	1	3	7.84	20	0	0	20.2	26	21	18	12	15
Jorge Alcalá	0	0	5.02	15	0	0	14.1	18	8	8	7	15
Roddery Muñoz	0	0	8.18	9	0	0	11.0	9	10	10	9	14
Anthony Veneziano	0	0	4.50	2	0	0	4.0	3	2	2	1	5
Nick Raquet	0	0	0.00	2	0	0	2.0	0	0	0	1	1
Garrett Hampson	0	0	0.00	1	0	0	1.0	0	0	0	0	0
Alec Burleson	0	0	0.00	1	0	0	1.0	1	0	0	0	0
Totals	78	84	4.30	162	162	42	1432.0	1434	754	684	461	1209

Source:Baseball Reference

== Minor league system and first-year player draft ==
=== Teams ===
Level	Team	League	Division	Manager	W–L/Stats	Standing	Refs
Triple-A	Memphis Redbirds	International League	West	Ben Johnson			
Double-A	Springfield Cardinals	Texas League	North	Patrick Anderson			
High-A	Peoria Chiefs	Midwest League	West	Roberto Espinoza			
Single-A	Palm Beach Cardinals	Florida State League	East	Gary Kendall			
Rookie	FCL Cardinals	Florida Complex League	East	Willi Martin			
Foreign Rookie	DSL Cardinals	Dominican Summer League	Boca Chica South	Fray Peniche			
