= Nick Raquet =

American baseball player (born 1995)

Detroit Tigers
- Pitcher
- Born: December 12, 1995 (age 30); Boalsburg, Pennsylvania, U.S.
- Bats: Right Throws: Left

MLB debut
- September 8, 2025, for the St. Louis Cardinals

MLB statistics (through 2026 season)
- Win–loss record: 0–0
- Earned run average: 4.76
- Strikeouts: 2
- Stats at Baseball Reference

Teams
- St. Louis Cardinals (2025); Baltimore Orioles (2026)

Nick Raquet (/rəˈkeɪ/ rə-KAY; born December 12, 1995) is an American professional baseball pitcher in the Detroit Tigers organization. He has previously played in Major League Baseball (MLB) for the St. Louis Cardinals and Baltimore Orioles.

== Career ==
=== Amateur career ===
Raquet attended State College Area High School in State College, Pennsylvania. He enrolled at the University of North Carolina at Chapel Hill and began his college baseball career with the North Carolina Tar Heels before he transferred to the College of William & Mary to play for the William & Mary Tribe.

=== Washington Nationals ===
The Washington Nationals selected Raquet in the third round, with the 103rd overall selection, of the 2017 Major League Baseball draft. He split his first professional season between the rookie-level Gulf Coast League Nationals and Low-A Auburn Doubledays. Raquet spent the 2018 season with the Single-A Hagerstown Suns and High-A Potomac Nationals, pitching to a combined 9–9 record and 3.74 ERA with 92 strikeouts across 24 starts.

Raquet made 25 starts for Potomac during the 2019 season, compiling an 11–9 record and 4.07 ERA with 122 strikeouts across 130 1/3 innings pitched. After the regular season, Raquet played for the Surprise Saguaros of the Arizona Fall League, where he had an 8.49 earned run average (ERA). As the 2020 Minor League Baseball season was cancelled due to the COVID-19 pandemic, Raquet quit baseball returned to college to finish his degree. He worked as an enterprise risk consultant for Ernst & Young.

=== York Revolution ===
Raquet decided to return to baseball in 2023 with the York Revolution of the Atlantic League, an independent baseball league. Raquet and Zach Mort were named co-Pitcher of the Year for the Atlantic League. In 24 total starts for York, he had compiled a 13–7 record and 3.71 ERA with 133 strikeouts across 145 2/3 innings pitched.

=== St. Louis Cardinals ===
On January 16, 2024, Raquet signed a minor league contract with the St. Louis Cardinals. He made 35 appearances (six starts) for the Double-A Springfield Cardinals and Triple-A Memphis Redbirds, accumulating a 2–9 record and 4.80 ERA with 73 strikeouts across 84 1/3 innings pitched. Raquet was released by the Cardinals organization on September 26.

On January 15, 2025, Raquet re-signed with the Cardinals organization on a minor league contract. He made 39 relief appearances for Springfield and Memphis, registering a combined 10-4 record and 2.24 ERA with 60 strikeouts and eight saves across 52 1/3 innings pitched. On September 8, Raquet was selected to the 40-man roster and promoted to the major leagues for the first time. He debuted for the Cardinals that night against the Seattle Mariners, pitching for a single inning. Raquet made two scoreless appearances for St. Louis during his rookie campaign, recording one strikeout across two innings of work.

Raquet was optioned to Triple-A Memphis to begin the 2026 season. On April 5, 2026, Raquet was designated for assignment by St. Louis following the promotion of Jared Shuster.

=== Baltimore Orioles ===
On April 6, 2026, Raquet was traded to the Baltimore Orioles in exchange for Brayden Smith. He made four appearances for Baltimore, recording a 7.36 ERA with one strikeout across 3 2/3 innings pitched. Raquet was designated for assignment by the Orioles on September 1. He was released the same day.

=== Detroit Tigers ===
On October 17, 2026, Raquet signed a two-year minor league contract with the Detroit Tigers.
