= Andre Granillo =

American baseball player (born 2000)

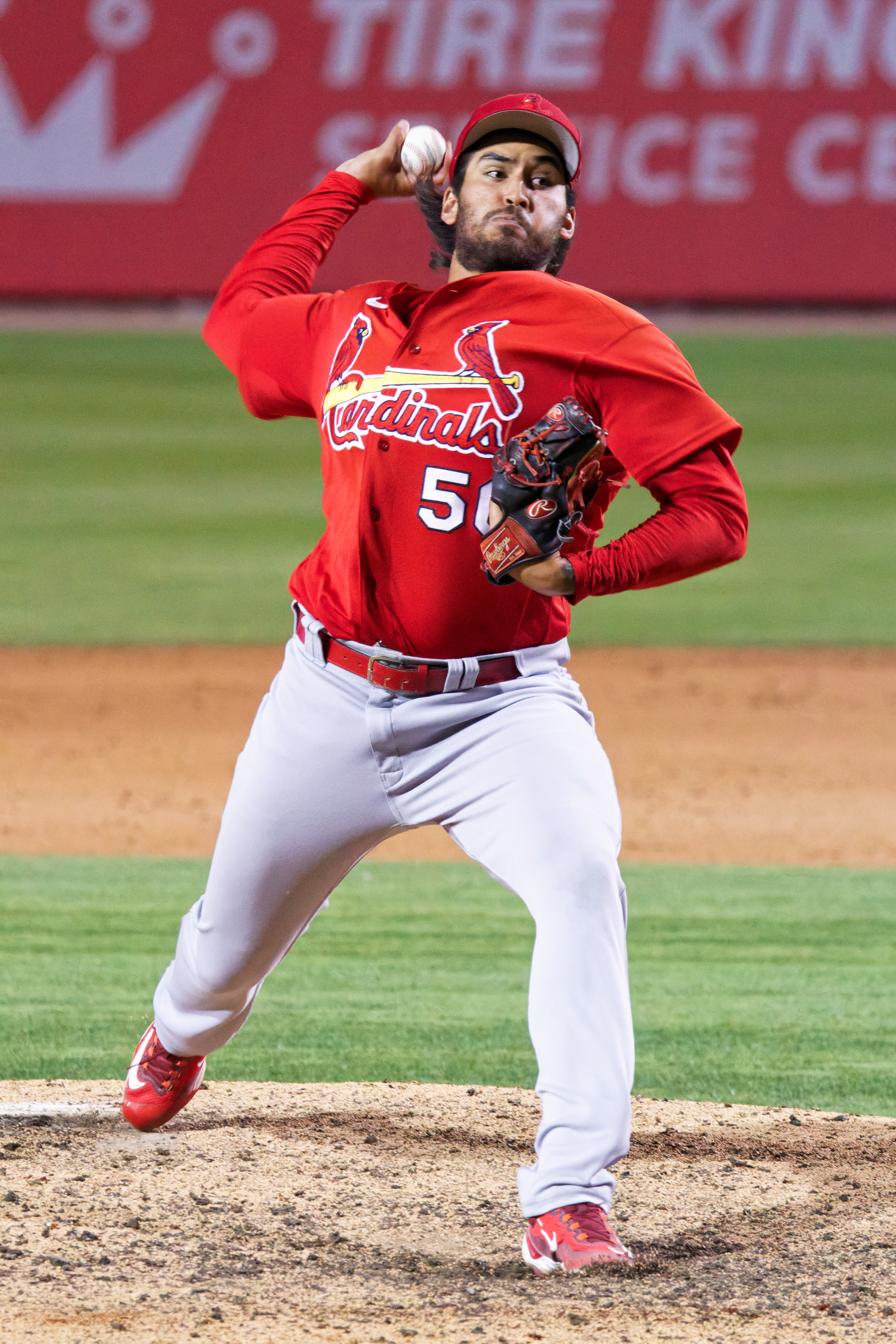
- Granillo with the Cardinals in 2023

Detroit Tigers
- Pitcher
- Born: May 12, 2000 (age 26); Hemet, California, U.S.
- Bats: Right Throws: Right

MLB debut
- June 12, 2025, for the St. Louis Cardinals

MLB statistics (through 2026 season)
- Win–loss record: 1–0
- Earned run average: 6.23
- Strikeouts: 21
- Stats at Baseball Reference

Teams
- St. Louis Cardinals (2025); Washington Nationals (2026)

Andre Anthony Granillo (born May 12, 2000) is an American professional baseball pitcher in the Detroit Tigers organization. He has previously played in Major League Baseball (MLB) for the St. Louis Cardinals and Washington Nationals.

== Amateur career ==
Granillo attended West Valley High School in Hemet, California, and the University of California, Riverside, where he played college baseball for the UC Riverside Highlanders. During the summer of 2020, he played collegiate summer baseball with the Mankato MoonDogs of the Northwoods League. In 2021, he played in the Cape Cod Baseball League for the Cotuit Kettleers.

== Professional career ==
=== St. Louis Cardinals ===
Granillo was selected by the St. Louis Cardinals in the 14th round (421st overall) of the 2021 Major League Baseball draft, and signed with the team.

Granillo made his professional debut with the Single-A Palm Beach Cardinals with whom he pitched to a 1.50 ERA over 18 innings. He opened the 2022 season with Palm Beach and was promoted to the High-A Peoria Chiefs and Double-A Springfield Cardinals throughout the season, going 4–6 with a 4.13 ERA and 82 strikeouts over 52 1/3 innings pitched between the three clubs. Granillo returned to Springfield to open the 2023 season and was promoted to the Triple-A Memphis Redbirds in mid-August. Over 53 relief appearances between the two teams, he went 3–4 with a 4.74 ERA, 89 strikeouts, and 14 saves over 68 1/3 innings. He was selected to participate in the Arizona Fall League with the Scottsdale Scorpions after the season. Granillo returned to Springfield to open the 2024 season and was promoted to Memphis in mid-May. Over 48 relief appearances between both clubs, Granillo posted an 8–2 record and 3.88 ERA with 80 strikeouts over 65 innings.

Granillo was assigned to Memphis to open the 2025 season. Over 18 relief appearances and 29 2/3 innings prior to his MLB promotion, he posted a 1.82 ERA and 46 strikeouts. On June 12, 2025, the Cardinals selected his contract and promoted him to the major leagues. He made his MLB debut that night versus the Milwaukee Brewers at American Family Field, pitching 2 2/3 scoreless innings with two strikeouts. On June 19, Granillo appeared in both games of a doubleheader against the Chicago White Sox; he recorded his first career win in the first game, and logged his first career save in the second game. He was optioned to Memphis and recalled to St. Louis various times during the season. In total, Granillo appeared in 14 games for the Cardinals and went 1–0 with a 4.71 ERA and 18 strikeouts over 21 innings.

=== Washington Nationals ===
On February 10, 2026, Granillo was traded to the Washington Nationals in exchange for George Soriano. He was named to Washington's Opening Day roster, the first of his MLB career. He made eight appearances for Washington, recording a 9.64 ERA with three strikeouts across 9 1/3 innings pitched. He also made 25 relief appearances for the Triple-A Rochester Red Wings, with whom he had a 6.82 ERA. On July 4, Granillo was designated for assignment by the Nationals.

=== Detroit Tigers ===
On July 11, 2026, Granillo was claimed off waivers by the Detroit Tigers and optioned to the Triple-A Toledo Mud Hens. He was designated for assignment and removed from Detroit's 40-man roster on July 31. On August 4, Granillo cleared waivers and was sent outright to Toledo. He pitched in 13 games for Toledo and had a 3–0 record, a 6.89 ERA and 19 strikeouts over 15 2/3 innings.
