= JoJo Romero =

American baseball player (born 1996)

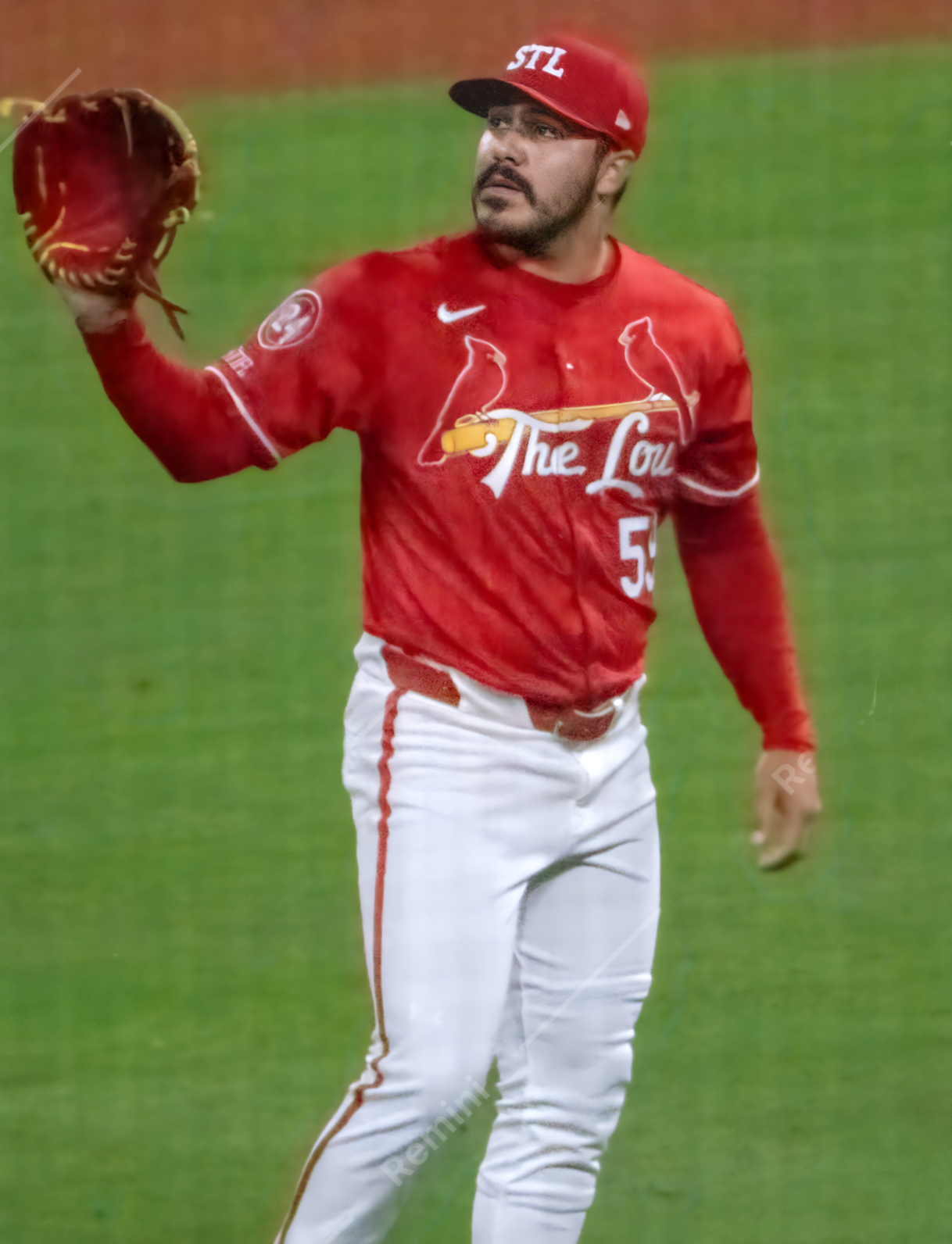
- Romero with the St. Louis Cardinals 2024

Free agent
- Pitcher
- Born: September 9, 1996 (age 30); Camarillo, California, U.S.
- Bats: Left Throws: Left

MLB debut
- August 21, 2020, for the Philadelphia Phillies

MLB statistics (through 2026 season)
- Win–loss record: 18–14
- Earned run average: 3.51
- Strikeouts: 237
- Stats at Baseball Reference

Teams
- Philadelphia Phillies (2020–2022); St. Louis Cardinals (2022–2026); Milwaukee Brewers (2026)

Career highlights and awards
- World Series champion (2026)
Medals
Men's baseball
Representing Mexico
World Baseball Classic
Bronze medal – third place	2023 Miami	Team

Joseph Abel "JoJo" Romero (born September 9, 1996) is an American professional baseball pitcher who is a free agent. He has played in Major League Baseball (MLB) for the Philadelphia Phillies, St. Louis Cardinals and Milwaukee Brewers. Romero also represents the Mexico national baseball team.

== Early life ==
Romero was born on September 9, 1996, in Camarillo, California, the eldest of three children. He cites his experience watching his father play in a Southern California baseball league as inspiring him to take up the sport. He is of Mexican descent, and got his nickname from his grandfather who couldn't pronounce his name in English.

== Baseball career ==
Romero attended Oxnard High School in Oxnard, California. In 2013, as a junior, he went 10–2 with a 1.24 earned run average (ERA) along with batting .308. Romero then played college baseball at the University of Nevada and Yavapai College.

=== Minor leagues ===
Romero was drafted by the Philadelphia Phillies in the fourth round (107th pick overall) of the 2016 Major League Baseball draft. After signing, Romero made his professional debut with the Williamsport Crosscutters. He spent the whole season there, going 2–2 with a 2.56 ERA in ten games.

In 2017, Romero played for the Lakewood BlueClaws and Clearwater Threshers. After posting a combined 10–3 (W–L) record, with a 2.16 ERA, and 128 strikeouts, he was named the Phillies’ minor league pitcher of the year. Showing a glimpse of Romero’s enormous promise, on May 10, 2017, he threw eight one-hit innings against the Greenville Drive, in a BlueClaws home victory at FirstEnergy Park.

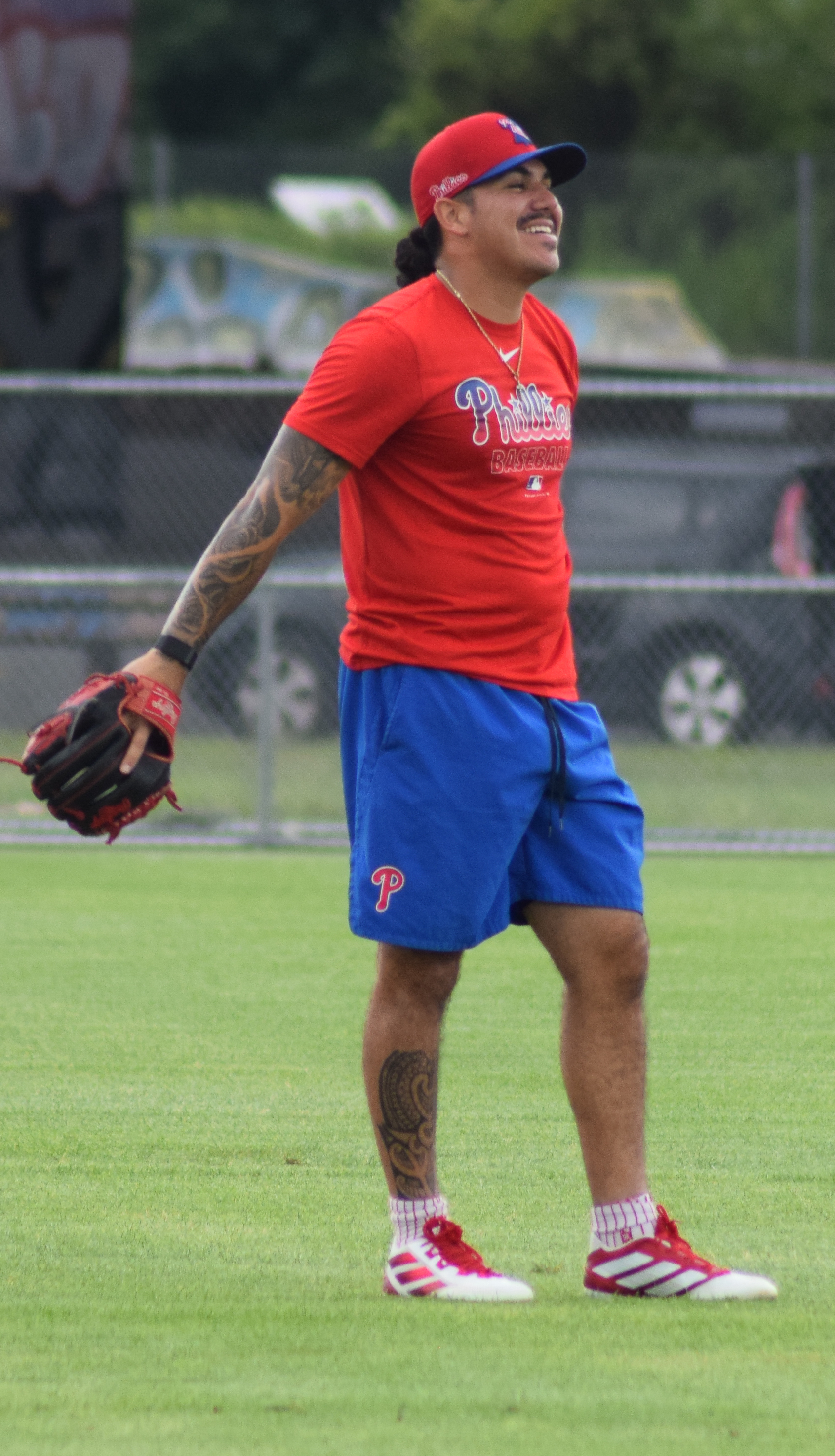
Romero with the Phillies.

In 2018, with the Reading Fightin Phils, Romero was 7–6 with a 3.80 ERA, with 100 strikeouts in 106.2 innings. He was selected to play in the Arizona Fall League for the Scottsdale Scorpions following the 2019 season. On November 20, 2019, Romero was added to the Phils’ 40–man roster.

=== Philadelphia Phillies ===
On August 21, 2020, with the Phillies playing a road game in Atlanta, Romero made his big league debut. He pitched the eighth inning, with the Braves ahead 11–2. Romero struck out all three batters that he faced. Romero finished his rookie season with a 7.59 ERA in 12 appearances.

On May 19, 2021, it was announced that Romero would undergo Tommy John surgery, ending his season. In 11 games, Romero recorded a 7.00 ERA with eight strikeouts.

On July 15, 2022, Romero was activated from the injured list to make his return from surgery. In two appearances for Philadelphia, he recorded a 13.50 ERA with one strikeout in two innings.

=== St. Louis Cardinals ===
On July 30, 2022, Romero was traded to the St. Louis Cardinals in exchange for infielder Edmundo Sosa. Romero pitched in 15 games for St. Louis down the stretch, recording a 3.77 ERA with 16 strikeouts in 14 1/3 innings of work.

Romero was optioned to the Triple-A Memphis Redbirds to begin the 2023 season. He was recalled by the Cardinals twice during the season before he was placed on the injured list with a knee injury, ending his season. Across 27 relief appearances for St. Louis in 2023, Romero had a 4-2 record and 3.68 ERA.

Romero was named to St. Louis' Opening Day roster for the 2024 season. He pitched the entirety of the season out of the Cardinals bullpen and posted a 7-3 record and a 3.36 ERA across 65 relief appearances. He recorded one save in nine opportunities. He was placed on the injured list with left forearm flexor inflammation in September, forcing him to miss the last seven games of the season.

Romero returned to the St. Louis bullpen for the 2025 season and made 65 appearances in which he had a 4-6 record, a 2.07 ERA, and 55 strikeouts across 61 innings alongside recording eight saves in nine opportunities.

Prior to the 2026 season, Romero and the Cardinals avoided salary arbitration by agreeing on a $4.25 million deal.

=== Milwaukee Brewers ===
On August 3, 2026, the Cardinals traded Romero and Dustin May to the Milwaukee Brewers in exchange for Josiah Ragsdale and Alexander Frias.

== International career ==
Romero played for the Mexico national baseball team at the 2023 World Baseball Classic.
