= Ryan Fernandez =

American baseball player (born 1998)

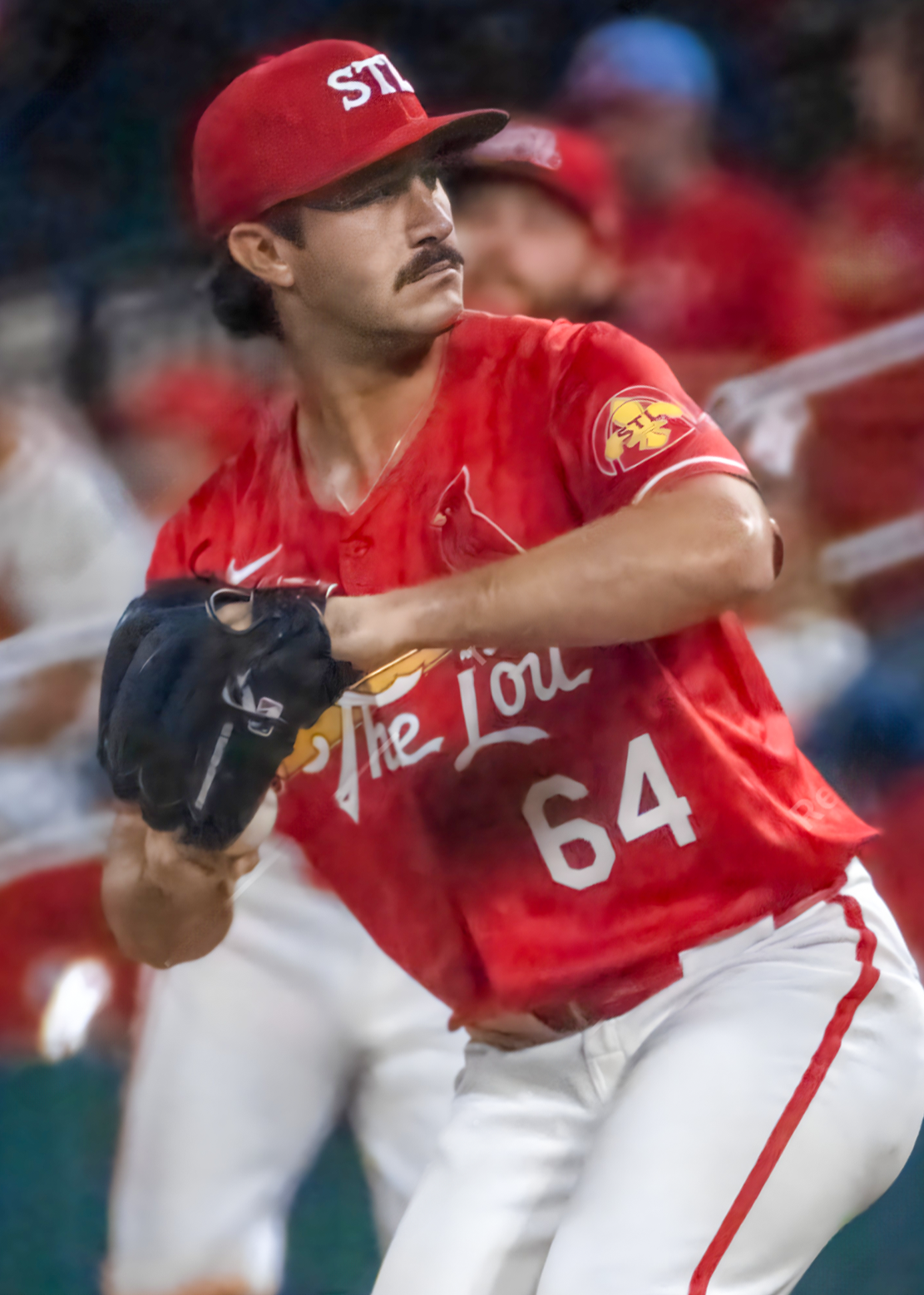
- Fernandez with the Cardinals in 2024

St. Louis Cardinals – No. 64
- Pitcher
- Born: June 11, 1998 (age 28); Tampa, Florida, U.S.
- Bats: Right Throws: Right

MLB debut
- April 3, 2024, for the St. Louis Cardinals

MLB statistics (through 2026 season)
- Win–loss record: 2–12
- Earned run average: 4.58
- Strikeouts: 133
- Stats at Baseball Reference

Teams
- St. Louis Cardinals (2024–present)

Ryan Austin Fernandez (born June 11, 1998) is an American professional baseball pitcher for the St. Louis Cardinals of Major League Baseball (MLB). He made his MLB debut in 2024.

== Career ==
=== Amateur career ===
Fernandez attended Braulio Alonso High School in Tampa, Florida, and played college baseball at Hillsborough Community College.

=== Boston Red Sox ===
The Boston Red Sox selected Fernandez in the 23rd round, with the 700th overall pick, in the 2018 Major League Baseball draft. He made his professional debut with the rookie-level Gulf Coast League Red Sox. Fernandez spent the 2019 season with the Low-A Lowell Spinners, registering a 4–1 record and 2.49 ERA with 38 strikeouts and four saves over 17 appearances. He did not play in a game in 2020 due to the cancellation of the minor league season because of the COVID-19 pandemic.

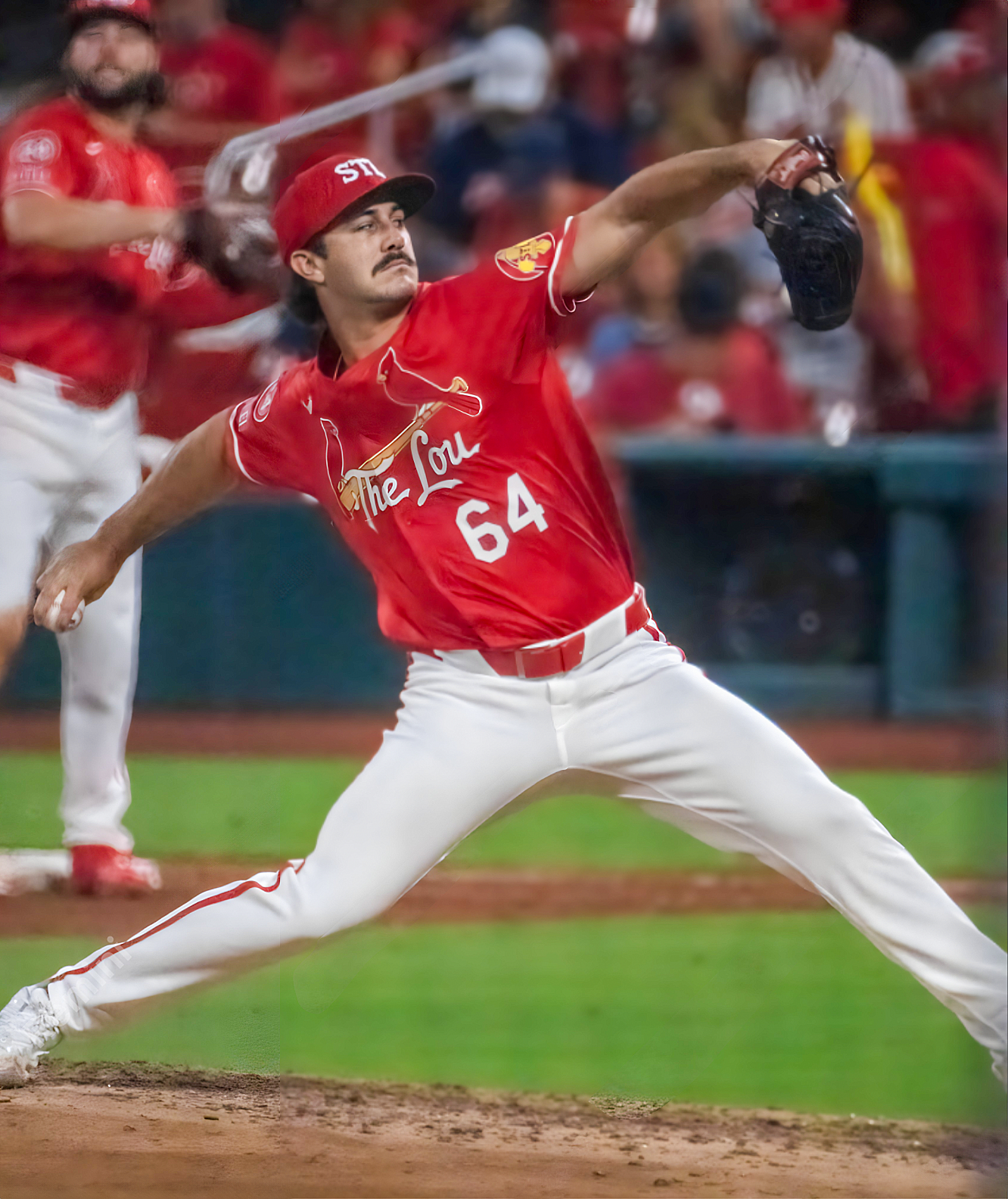
Ryan Fernandez with the Cardinals in 2024

Fernandez returned to action in 2021 with the Single-A Salem Red Sox and High-A Greenville Drive. In 24 appearances for the two affiliates, he posted a cumulative 4–1 record and 2.39 ERA with 60 strikeouts and two saves across 52 2/3 innings pitched. He split the 2022 campaign between the Greenville and the Double-A Portland Sea Dogs, accumulating a 2–3 record and 4.31 ERA with 56 strikeouts and 10 saves across 35 total appearances out of the bullpen. In 26 Triple-A games in 2023 with the Worcester Red Sox, all in relief, Fernandez posted a 3–3 record with a 6.16 ERA while striking out 35 batters in 30 2/3 innings.

=== St. Louis Cardinals ===
On December 6, 2023, the St. Louis Cardinals selected Fernandez from the Red Sox in the Rule 5 draft. He made the Cardinals' Opening Day roster as part of the team's bullpen. He made his debut on April 3, 2024, in a game against the San Diego Padres. Fernandez pitched the entirety of the 8th inning, allowing a hit and a walk and striking out three batters. Fernandez had a 3.51 ERA in 66 2/3 innings pitched for the Cardinals in the 2024 season.

Fernandez began the 2025 season with a 11.43 ERA in his first 8 2/3 innings, and was optioned to the Triple-A Memphis Redbirds. He was promoted back to the major leagues on August 1.

Fernandez was again optioned to Memphis to begin the 2026 season.

== See also ==
- Rule 5 draft results
