= Riley O'Brien =

American baseball player (born 1995)

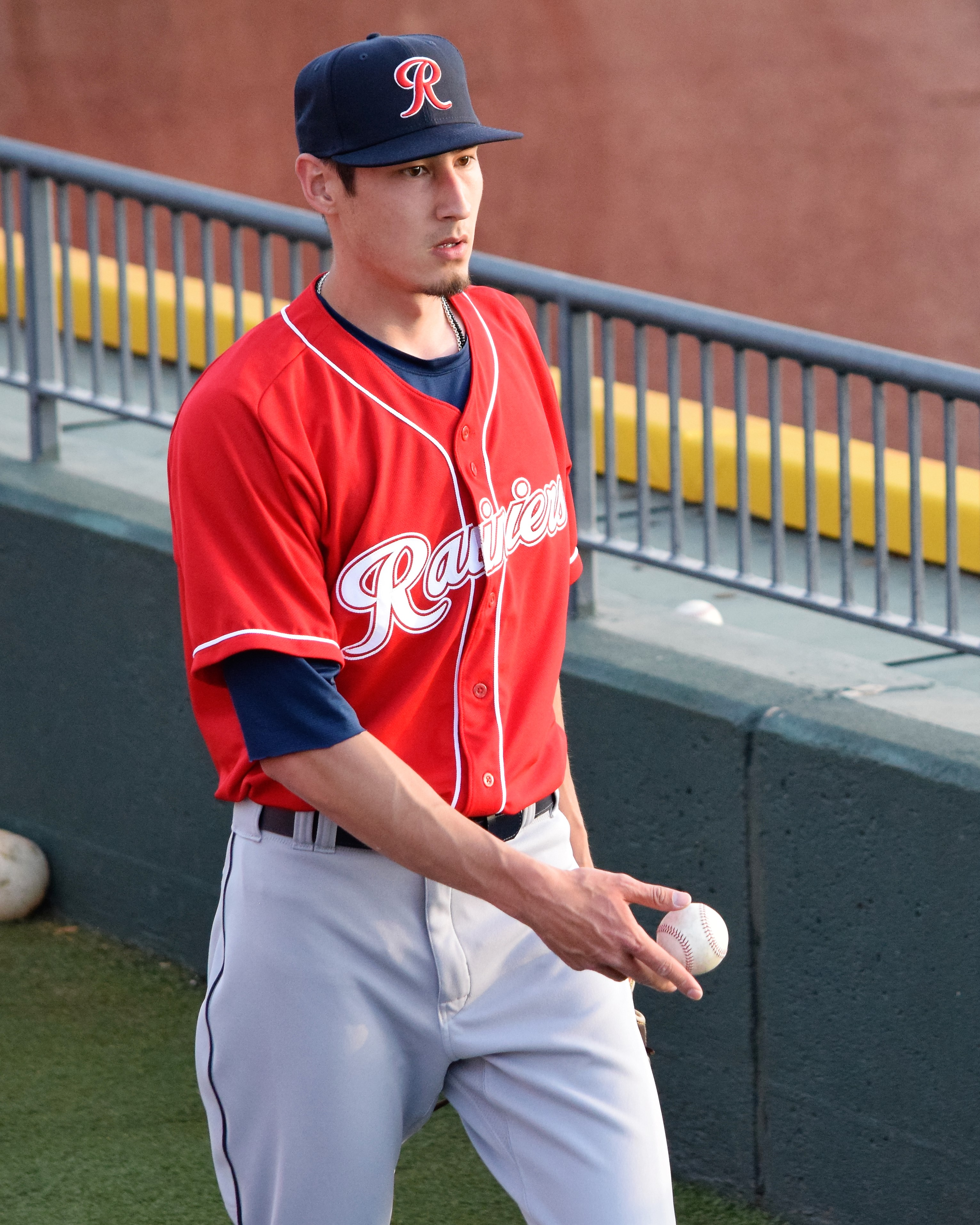
- O'Brien with the Tacoma Rainiers in 2023

St. Louis Cardinals – No. 61
- Pitcher
- Born: February 6, 1995 (age 31); Seattle, Washington, U.S.
- Bats: Right Throws: Right

MLB debut
- September 28, 2021, for the Cincinnati Reds

MLB statistics (through 2026 season)
- Win–loss record: 6–11
- Earned run average: 3.83
- Strikeouts: 123
- Saves: 44
- Stats at Baseball Reference

Teams
- Cincinnati Reds (2021); Seattle Mariners (2022); St. Louis Cardinals (2024–present)

Career highlights and awards
- All-Star (2026); NL saves leader (2026)

Riley Chun-Young O'Brien (born February 6, 1995) is an American professional baseball pitcher for the St. Louis Cardinals of Major League Baseball (MLB). He has previously played in MLB for the Cincinnati Reds and Seattle Mariners.

O'Brien played college baseball and Everett Community College and the College of Idaho. He was selected by the Tampa Bay Rays in the eight round of the 2017 Major League Baseball draft and made his MLB debut in 2021 with the Reds. With St. Louis, O'Brien was named to his first All-Star game in 2026 and was tied with Mason Miller for the NL lead in saves that same year with 38.

== Amateur career ==
O'Brien attended Shorewood High School in Shoreline, Washington, where he played baseball. He graduated in 2013, and then enrolled at Everett Community College. After two seasons at Everett, he transferred to the College of Idaho. As a junior in 2016, he went 6–3 with a 3.23 earned run average (ERA) and 60 strikeouts over 69 innings pitched for the Coyotes. In 2017, his senior year, he had a 3–4 record and 2.15 ERA over 67 innings. After the season, the Tampa Bay Rays selected him in the eighth round of the 2017 Major League Baseball draft.

== Professional career ==
=== Tampa Bay Rays ===
O'Brien signed with the Rays and made his professional debut that year with the Princeton Rays of the Advanced Rookie Appalachian League, going 1–0 with a 2.20 ERA over 11 games (ten starts). During the season, he was named Appalachian League Pitcher of the Week twice. In 2018, he began the season with the Bowling Green Hot Rods of the Single–A Midwest League (with whom he was named an All-Star) before being promoted to the Charlotte Stone Crabs of the High–A Florida State League, with whom he ended the year; over 25 games (13 starts) between both teams, he went 8–4 with a 2.75 ERA. In 2019, he began the season with Charlotte and was promoted to the Montgomery Biscuits of the Double–A Southern League in May. Over 20 games (17 starts) with the two clubs, he pitched to a 7–6 record and 3.16 ERA.

O'Brien did not play in a game in 2020 due to the cancellation of the minor league season because of the COVID-19 pandemic.

=== Cincinnati Reds ===
On August 28, 2020, the Rays traded O'Brien to the Cincinnati Reds in exchange for Cody Reed. On November 20, 2020, the Reds added O'Brien to their 40-man roster to protect him from the Rule 5 draft. To begin the 2021 season, he was assigned to the Louisville Bats of the Triple-A East. Over 23 games (22 starts), O'Brien pitched to a 7–7 record, a 4.55 ERA, and 121 strikeouts over 112 2/3 innings.

On September 28, 2021, the Reds recalled O'Brien to the active roster to make his MLB debut versus the Chicago White Sox. He was the starting pitcher and threw 1 1/3 innings, giving up two solo home runs while walking three and striking out two.

On April 13, 2022, the Reds designated O'Brien for assignment to make room for Nick Lodolo.

=== Seattle Mariners ===
On April 16, 2022, the Reds traded O’Brien to the Seattle Mariners for cash considerations or a player to be named later. (On June 3, minor league infielder Luis Chevalier was sent to Cincinnati to complete the trade). He was designated for assignment on May 27. He cleared waivers and was sent outright to the Triple-A Tacoma Rainiers on June 2.

O'Brien spent the entirety of the 2023 season in Triple–A with Tacoma. In 51 appearances, he registered a 2.29 ERA with 86 strikeouts and 15 saves across 55 innings pitched.

=== St. Louis Cardinals ===
On November 5, 2023, O'Brien was traded to the St. Louis Cardinals and subsequently added to the 40–man roster. On March 26, 2024, the Cardinals officially announced that O'Brien had made the Opening Day roster. On March 31, he was placed on the injured list with a flexor strain, and was transferred to the 60-day injured list on May 6. O'Brien was activated on August 11. In eight total appearances for St. Louis, he struggled to an 11.25 ERA with 11 strikeouts over eight innings of work.

O'Brien was optioned to the Triple-A Memphis Redbirds to begin the 2025 season. He was recalled to St. Louis for the first time during the season on April 25, before he was optioned back to Memphis on May 2. He was recalled to the Cardinals and optioned to Memphis once more before being recalled for a final time on June 9. On August 4, 2025, O'Brien recorded his first career win against the Los Angeles Dodgers; two days later, he recorded his first career save. He made a total of 42 relief appearances for the Cardinals and had a 3–1 record, a 2.06 ERA, 45 strikeouts and six saves across 48 innings pitched.

O'Brien was named to St. Louis' Opening Day roster to start the 2026 season, and was named the team's closer early in the season. On July 7, O'Brien was named to the National League All-Star Team, replacing Pittsburgh Pirates starter Paul Skenes. At the time of his selection, he had made 39 relief appearances with a 3.43 ERA and 24 saves. O'Brien ended the season with a 3–9 record, a 4.08 ERA, 64 strikeouts, and 29 walks across 64 innings. He tied with Mason Miller for the most saves in the National League with 38 across 46 opportunities.

== International career ==
O'Brien was named to the South Korea national baseball team in the 2026 World Baseball Classic; however, a calf injury prevented him from participating.

== Personal life ==
Riley O’Brien married his wife, Chellyn, on November 18, 2023. O'Brien's grandfather, Johnny O'Brien, played six seasons in the major leagues. His great uncle Eddie O'Brien also played in the majors.

Riley is of Korean descent on his mother's side.
