= Michael McGreevy =

American baseball player (born 2000)

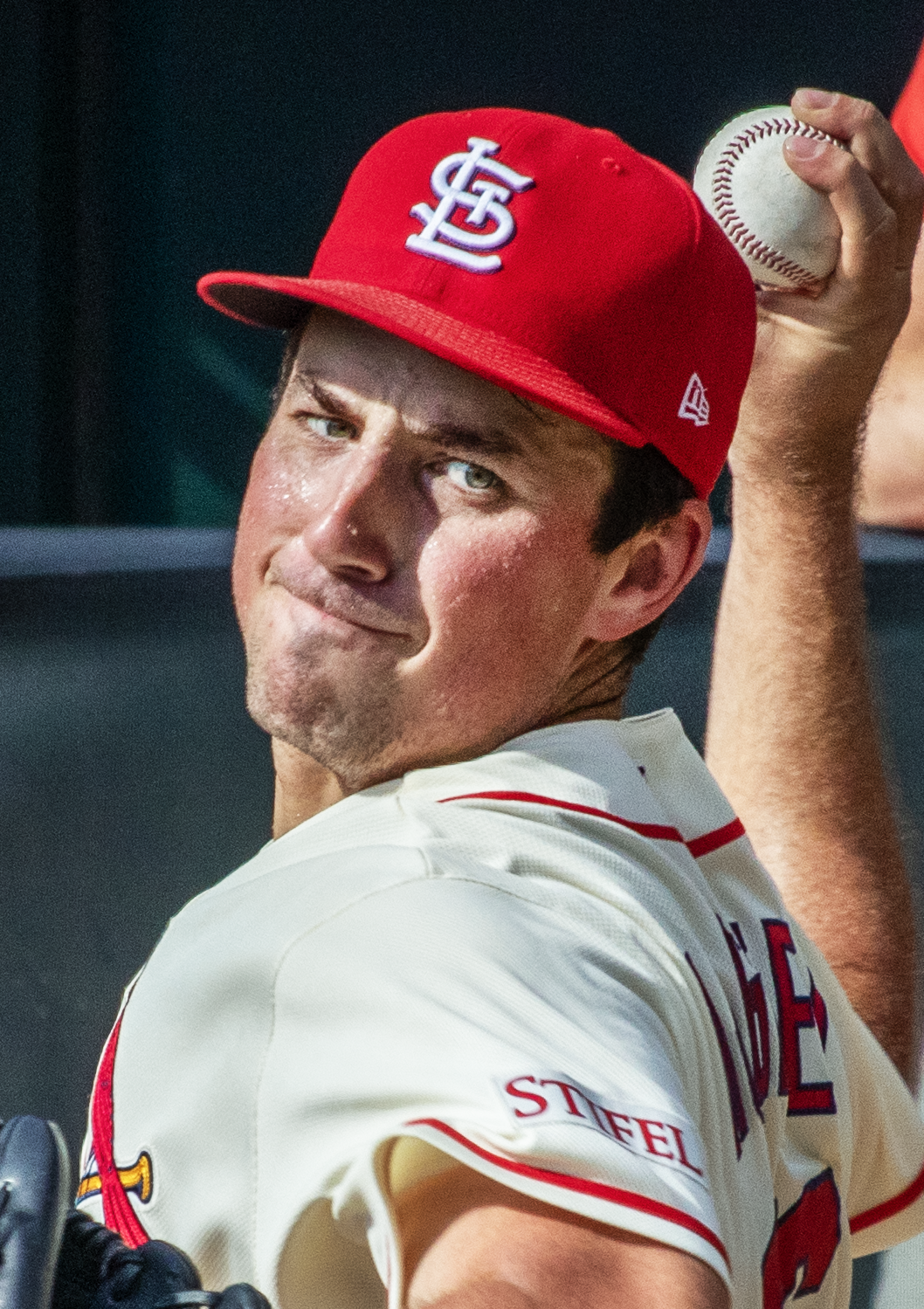
- McGreevy with the St. Louis Cardinals in 2026

St. Louis Cardinals – No. 36
- Pitcher
- Born: July 8, 2000 (age 26); San Clemente, California, U.S.
- Bats: Left Throws: Right

MLB debut
- July 31, 2024, for the St. Louis Cardinals

MLB statistics (through 2026 season)
- Win–loss record: 18–13
- Earned run average: 3.95
- Strikeouts: 191
- Stats at Baseball Reference

Teams
- St. Louis Cardinals (2024–present)

Michael Steven McGreevy (born July 8, 2000) is an American professional baseball pitcher for the St. Louis Cardinals of Major League Baseball (MLB). He made his MLB debut in 2024.

== Early life and education ==
McGreevy grew up in San Clemente, California, and attended San Clemente High School. He was teammates with Andre Pallante. In 2018, his senior year, he pitched to a 2.20 earned run average (ERA).

Undrafted out of high school, McGreevy enrolled at UC Santa Barbara where he pitched in 29 games as a reliever during his freshman season, posting a 5–1 record with six saves and was named first team All-Big West Conference and a freshman All-American by Baseball America. As a sophomore, he went 2–0 with a 0.99 ERA in four starts before the season was cut short due to the coronavirus pandemic. During his junior season, McGreevy became a first round prospect for the upcoming Major League Baseball draft. He finished his junior season with a 9–2 record, a 2.92 ERA and 115 strikeouts against 11 walks over 101 2/3 innings.

== Career ==
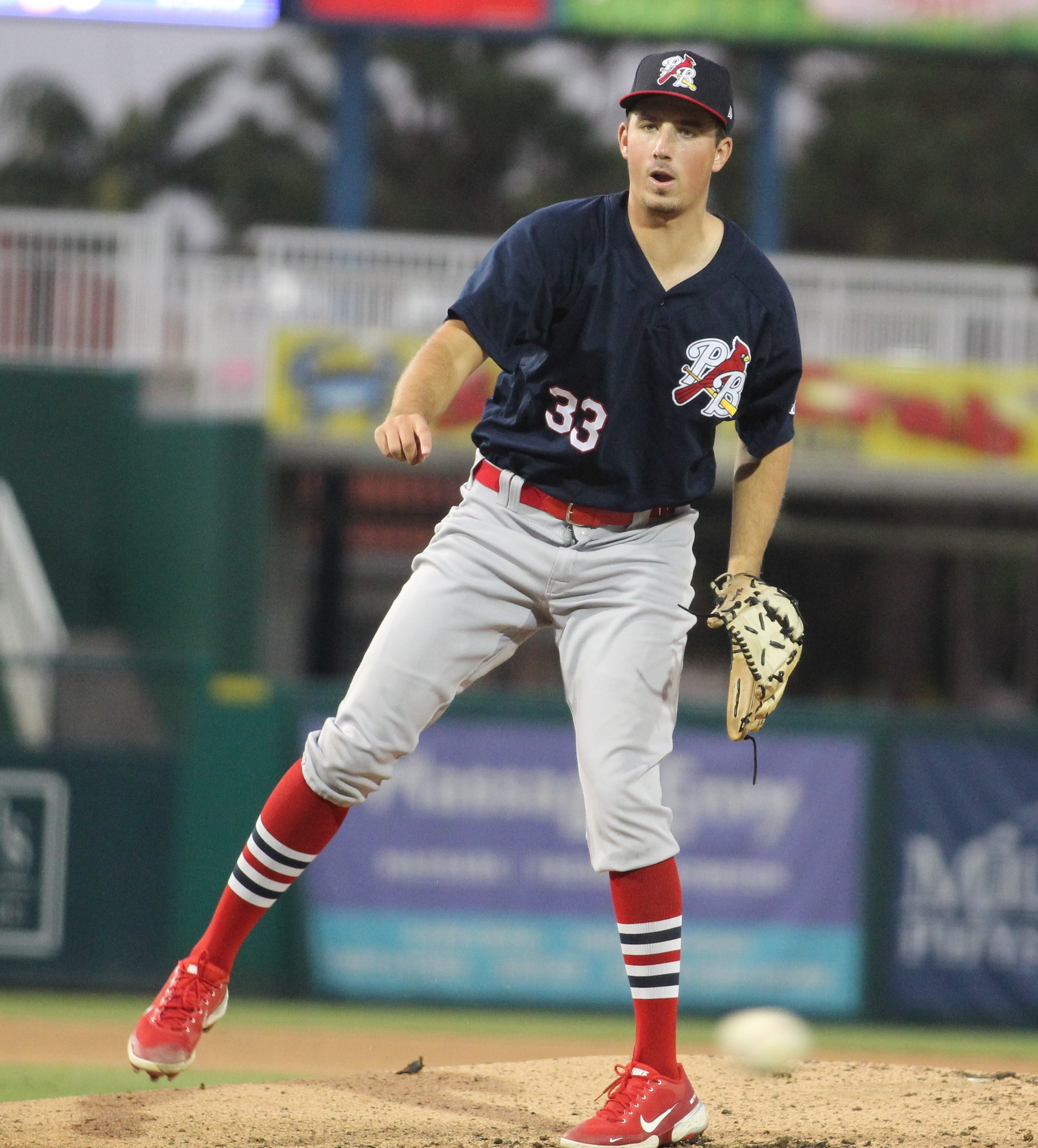
McGreevy in 2022.

The St. Louis Cardinals selected McGreevy in the first round, with the 18th overall selection, in the 2021 Major League Baseball draft. He signed with the Cardinals on July 16, 2021, for a $2.75 million bonus. McGreevy was assigned to the Rookie-level Florida Complex League Cardinals to start his professional career. After two games, he was promoted to the Palm Beach Cardinals of the Low-A Southeast. He started five games with Palm Beach, giving up six runs and ten hits over six innings.

McGreevy was assigned to the Peoria Chiefs of the High-A Midwest League to begin the 2022 season. After eight starts in which he went 3–1 with a 2.58 ERA over 45 1/3 innings, he was promoted to the Springfield Cardinals of the Double-A Texas League with whom he ended the season. Over twenty starts with Springfield, McGreevy went 6–4 with a 4.64 ERA and 76 strikeouts over 99 innings. He returned to Springfield to open the 2023 season and was quickly promoted to the Memphis Redbirds of the Triple-A International League. Over 27 starts between the two teams, McGreevy posted a 13–6 record, a 4.12 ERA, and 123 strikeouts over 153 innings.

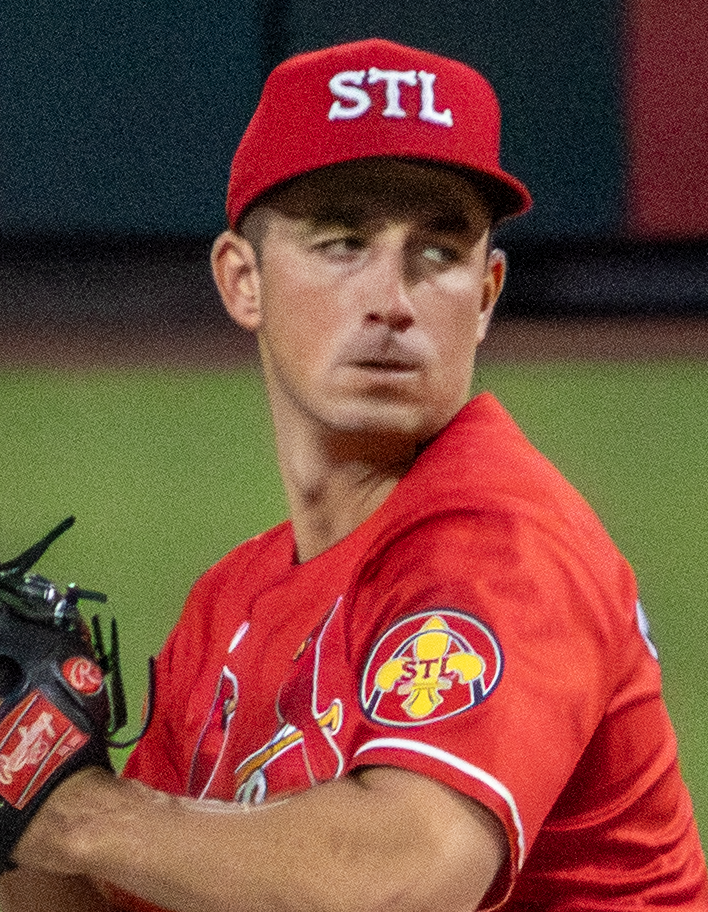
Michael McGreevy in 2025

McGreevy was assigned to Memphis to open the 2024 season. In 20 starts before his promotion, he compiled a 5–7 record and 4.45 ERA with 138 strikeouts across 150 innings pitched. On July 31, 2024, McGreevy was selected to the 40-man roster and promoted to the major leagues for the first time. He made his MLB debut that night as the starting pitcher versus the Texas Rangers, giving up one earned run and striking out three batters in a 10-1 Cardinals win. In four games (three starts) for the Cardinals during his rookie campaign, McGreevy posted a 3–0 record and 1.96 ERA with 18 strikeouts over 23 innings of work.

McGreevy was optioned to Triple-A Memphis to begin the 2025 season. In six starts of his second stint in the minors, he compiled a 3–1 record and 4.08 ERA with 25 strikeouts across 28 2/3 innings of work. On May 4, 2025, McGreevy was promoted to the major leagues for the second time in his career. He was optioned back to Memphis in June, and was called up and sent back down multiple times throughout the month. On July 21, he was promoted to St. Louis once again, and played the remainder of the season with the team. McGreevy pitched in a total of 17 games (16 starts) for the Cardinals and ended the season with an 8–4 record, a 4.42 ERA, and 58 strikeouts over 95 2/3 innings.

In 2026, the Cardinals named McGreevy to his first ever Opening Day roster. He started 31 games and had a 7–9 record, a 3.95 ERA, and 115 strikeouts over 168 2/3 innings. After the season, McGreevy was named a finalist for a Gold Glove Award for National League pitchers.
