= Jimmy Crooks =

American baseball player (born 2001)

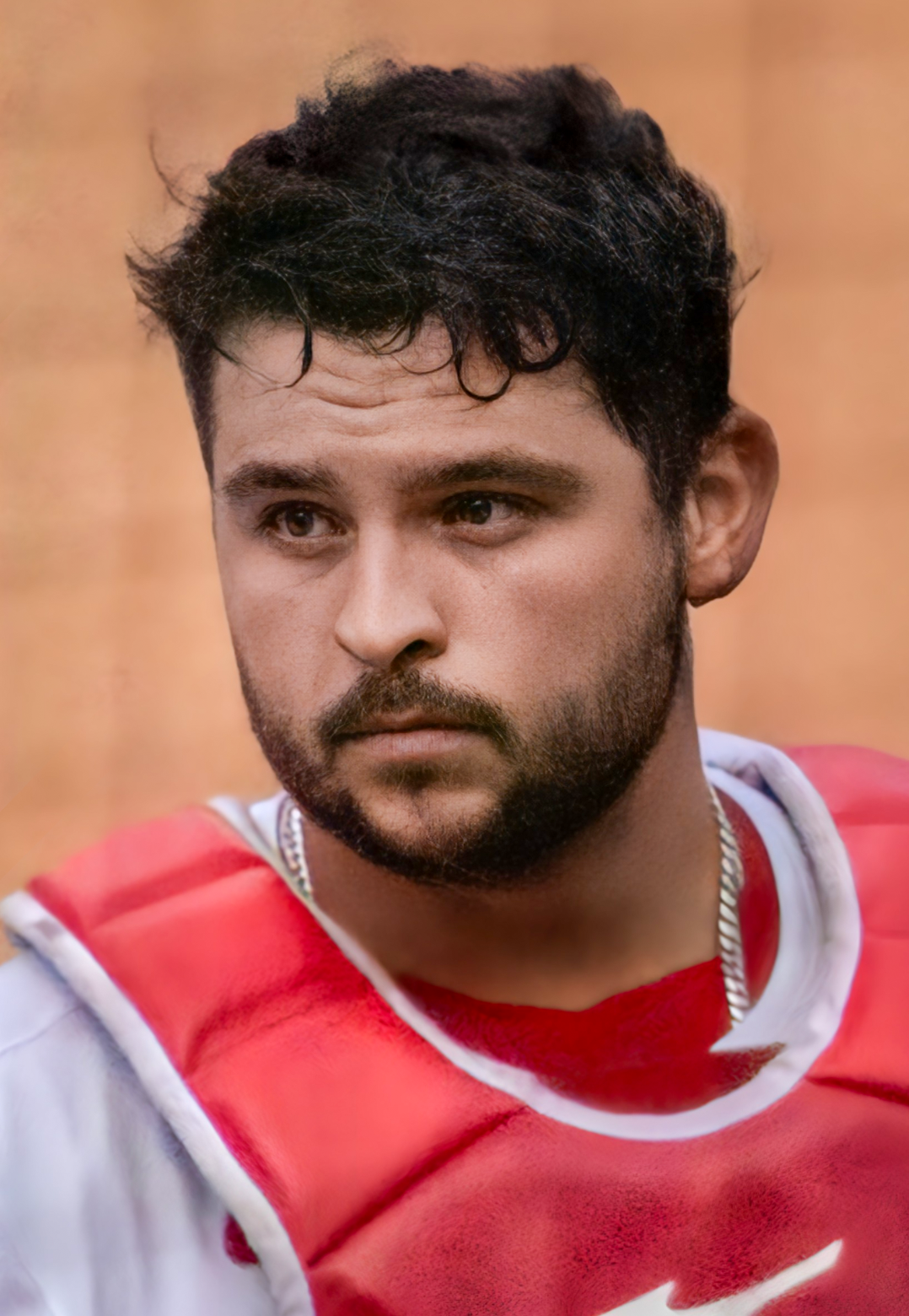
- Crooks with the Cardinals in 2025

St. Louis Cardinals – No. 8
- Catcher
- Born: July 19, 2001 (age 25); Euless, Texas, U.S.
- Bats: Left Throws: Right

MLB debut
- August 29, 2025, for the St. Louis Cardinals

MLB statistics (through 2026 season)
- Batting average: .168
- Home runs: 6
- Runs batted in: 15
- Stats at Baseball Reference

Teams
- St. Louis Cardinals (2025–present)

James Dale Crooks II (born July 19, 2001) is an American professional baseball catcher for the St. Louis Cardinals of Major League Baseball (MLB). He made his MLB debut in 2025.

== Amateur career ==
Crooks attended Trinity High School in Euless, Texas and played college baseball at McLennan Community College and the University of Oklahoma. In 2021, he played collegiate summer baseball with the Wareham Gatemen of the Cape Cod Baseball League.

== Professional career ==
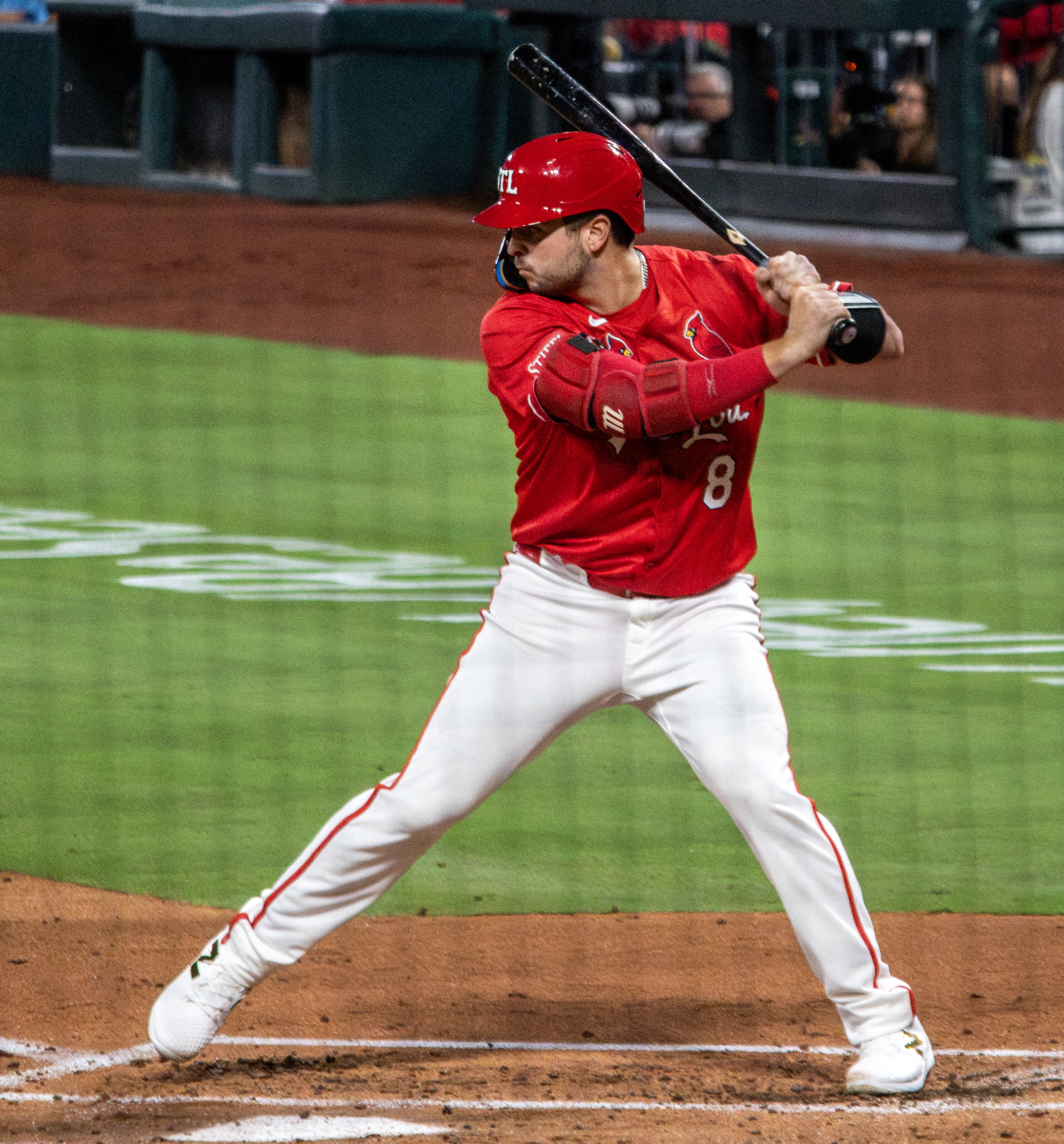
Crooks in St. Louis in 2025.

Crooks was drafted by the St. Louis Cardinals in the fourth round, with the 127th overall selection, of the 2022 Major League Baseball draft.

Crooks made his professional debut in 2022 with the Single-A Palm Beach Cardinals, batting .266 over 23 games. He spent the 2023 campaign with the High-A Peoria Chiefs, and also appeared in one game with the Triple-A Memphis Redbirds, hitting .271 with 12 home runs and 73 RBI across 115 total appearances. After the season, Crooks played in the Arizona Fall League for the Scottsdale Scorpions. Crooks played the 2024 season with the Double-A Springfield Cardinals, appearing in ninety games and batting .321 with 11 home runs and 62 RBI.

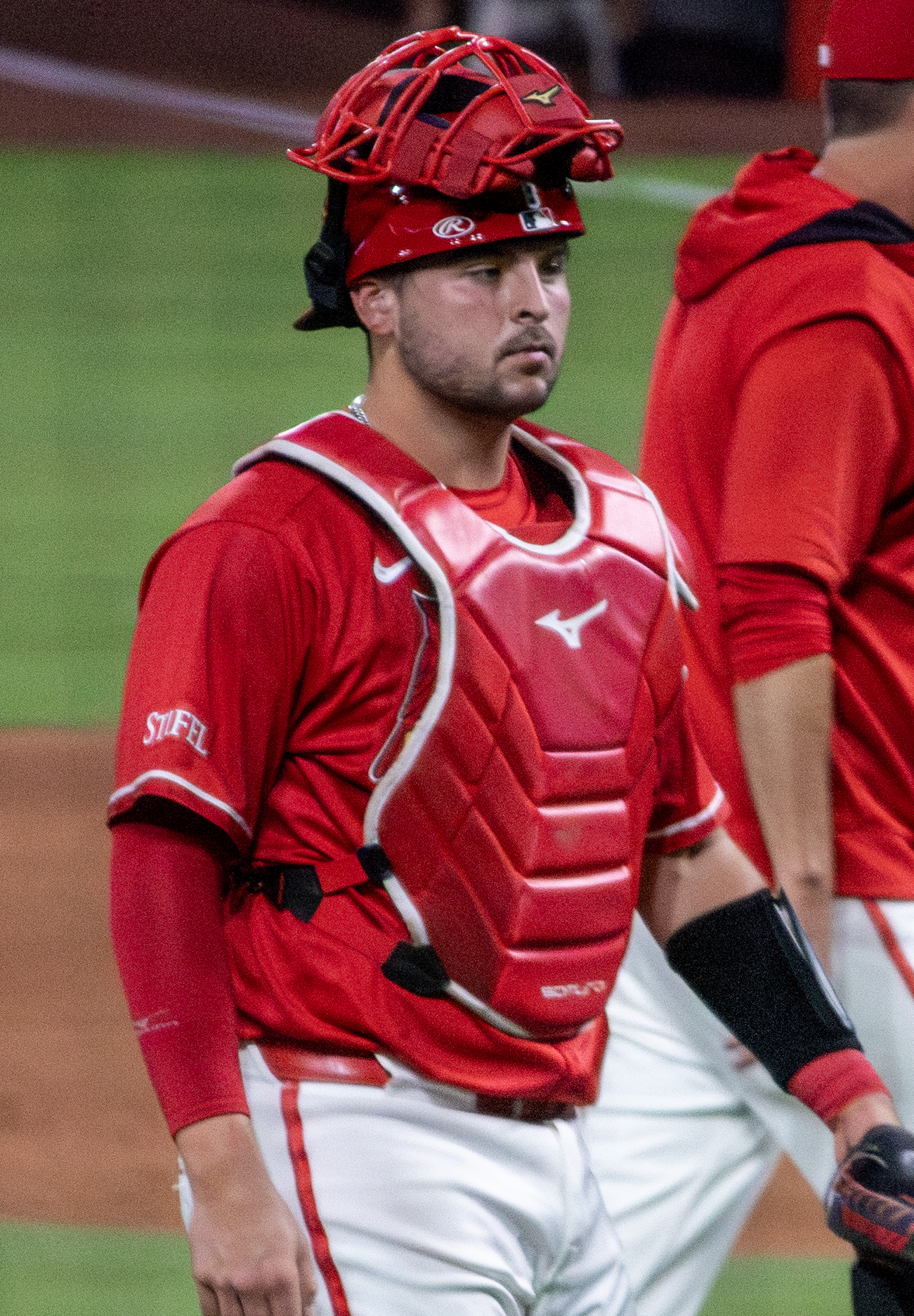
Crooks in 2025.

Crooks was assigned to Memphis to open the 2025 season. On August 29, 2025, the Cardinals selected Crooks' contract and promoted him to the major leagues for the first time. He made his MLB debut that night versus the Cincinnati Reds at Great American Ball Park, catching the last two innings of the game, without registering a plate appearance. The Cardinals would go on to beat the Reds 7-5 in 10 innings. Crooks made his first MLB start on August 31 against the Reds, and recorded his first MLB hit, a solo home run off of reliever Sam Moll. He made 15 appearances for the Cardinals during his rookie campaign, batting .133/.152/.244 with one home run and one RBI.

Crooks was optioned to Triple-A Memphis to begin the 2026 season.
