= Andre Pallante =

American baseball player (born 1998)

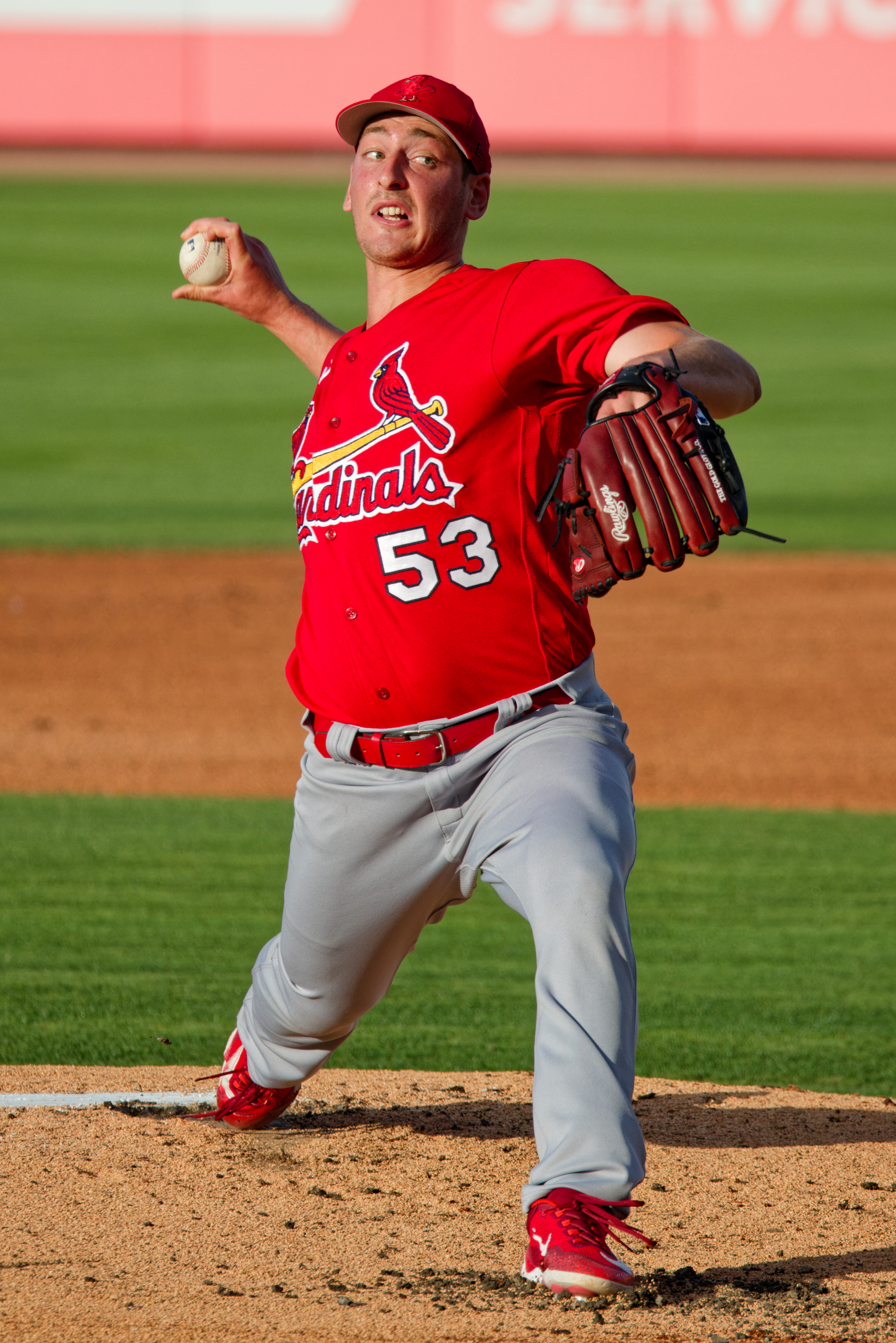
- Pallante with the St. Louis Cardinals in 2023

St. Louis Cardinals – No. 53
- Pitcher
- Born: September 18, 1998 (age 28); Mission Viejo, California, U.S.
- Bats: Right Throws: Right

MLB debut
- April 10, 2022, for the St. Louis Cardinals

MLB statistics (through 2026 season)
- Win–loss record: 36–38
- Earned run average: 4.20
- Strikeouts: 431
- Stats at Baseball Reference

Teams
- St. Louis Cardinals (2022–present)

Neil Andre Pallante (pə-LAWN-tay; born September 18, 1998) is an American professional baseball pitcher for the St. Louis Cardinals of Major League Baseball (MLB). He made his MLB debut in 2022.

Born and raised in Orange County, California, Pallante played three seasons of college baseball at the University of California, Irvine. The Cardinals selected him in the fourth round of the 2019 MLB draft. He was in their minor league system for four seasons before making his MLB debut in 2022, splitting time between a relief role and their starting rotation.

== Amateur career ==
Pallante attended San Clemente High School in San Clemente, California, where he played baseball and was teammates with Kolby Allard and Michael McGreevy. As a junior in 2015, he pitched to a 1.72 ERA over a team leading 73 1/3 innings. In 2016, his senior season, he went 6-3 with a 1.02 ERA.

Following high school, Pallante enrolled at the University of California, Irvine where he played college baseball for the Anteaters. After his freshman year in 2017, Pallante played collegiate summer baseball for the Chatham Anglers of the Cape Cod Baseball League. In 2018, as a sophomore, he started 15 games and went 10–1 with a 1.60 ERA, second lowest in school history. He was selected to play for the USA Baseball Collegiate National Team that summer. As a junior at UC Irvine, Pallante started 15 games and compiled a 10–4 record and 2.68 ERA over 94 innings. After the season, he was selected by the St. Louis Cardinals in the fourth round of the 2019 Major League Baseball draft.

== Professional career ==
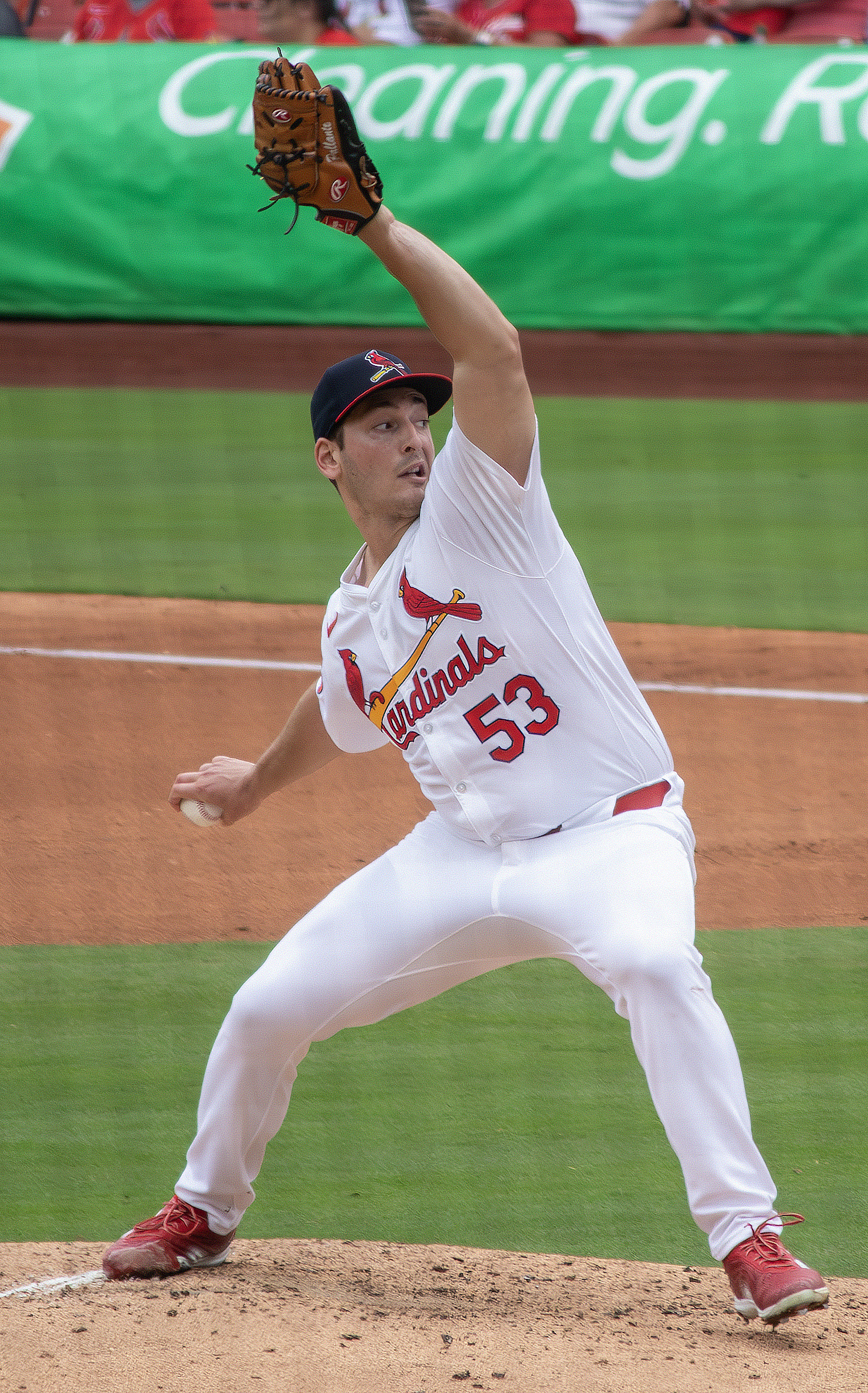
Andre Pallante in 2024.

Pallante signed with the Cardinals and made his professional debut with the State College Spikes of the Class A Short Season New York–Penn League, going 1–0 with a 2.78 ERA over 35 2/3 innings. He did not play a minor league game in 2020 due to the cancellation of the minor league season caused by the COVID-19 pandemic. For a majority of the 2021 season, Pallante played with the Springfield Cardinals of the Double-A Central and started 21 games in which he went 4–7 with a 3.82 ERA and 82 strikeouts over 94 1/3 innings. After the end of Springfield's season in mid-September, he was promoted to the Memphis Redbirds of the Triple-A East, with whom he appeared in two games. He was selected to play in the Arizona Fall League for the Glendale Desert Dogs after the season where he was named to the Fall Stars Game.

=== St. Louis Cardinals ===
Pallante was a non-roster invitee to spring training in 2022, and on April 4, the Cardinals announced that he had been named to the Opening Day roster. He made his MLB debut on April 10 versus the Pittsburgh Pirates, throwing one inning in relief and giving up one earned run. In early June, he moved into the starting rotation. Over 47 games (ten starts) as a rookie for the Cardinals in 2022, Pallante went 6–5 with a 3.17 ERA and 73 strikeouts over 108 innings.

Pallante spent the 2023 season in the Cardinals bullpen, appearing in 62 games and going 4–1 with a 4.76 ERA over 68 innings. In 2024, he moved back into the starting rotation. Over 29 games (twenty starts), he went 8-8 with a 3.78 ERA.

Prior to the 2025 season, Pallante defeated the Cardinals in salary arbitration to earn $2.1 million as opposed to St. Louis' $1.9 million offer. He returned as a member of St. Louis' starting rotation for the 2025 season. He started 31 games and pitched to a 6–15 record, a 5.31 ERA, and 111 strikeouts over 162 2/3 innings.

Pallante opened the 2026 season in the St. Louis starting rotation. On August 21, he was placed on the injured list with right elbow inflammation which caused him to miss two weeks before he returned to the Cardinals on September 4. Pallante made a total of 29 starts for the season and ended with a 12–9 record, a 3.83 ERA, and 110 strikeouts across 162 innings.

== International career ==
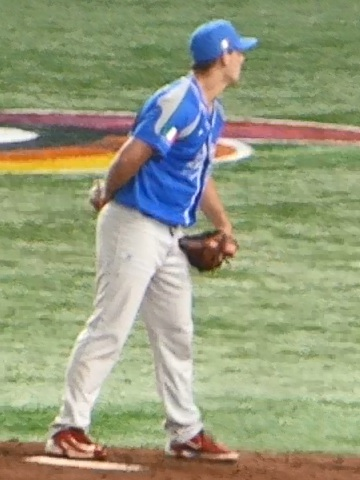
Pallante with the WBC Italy national team at Tokyo Dome on March 16, 2023

Pallante played for the Italy national baseball team at the 2023 World Baseball Classic.
