= Matthew Liberatore =

American baseball player (born 1999)

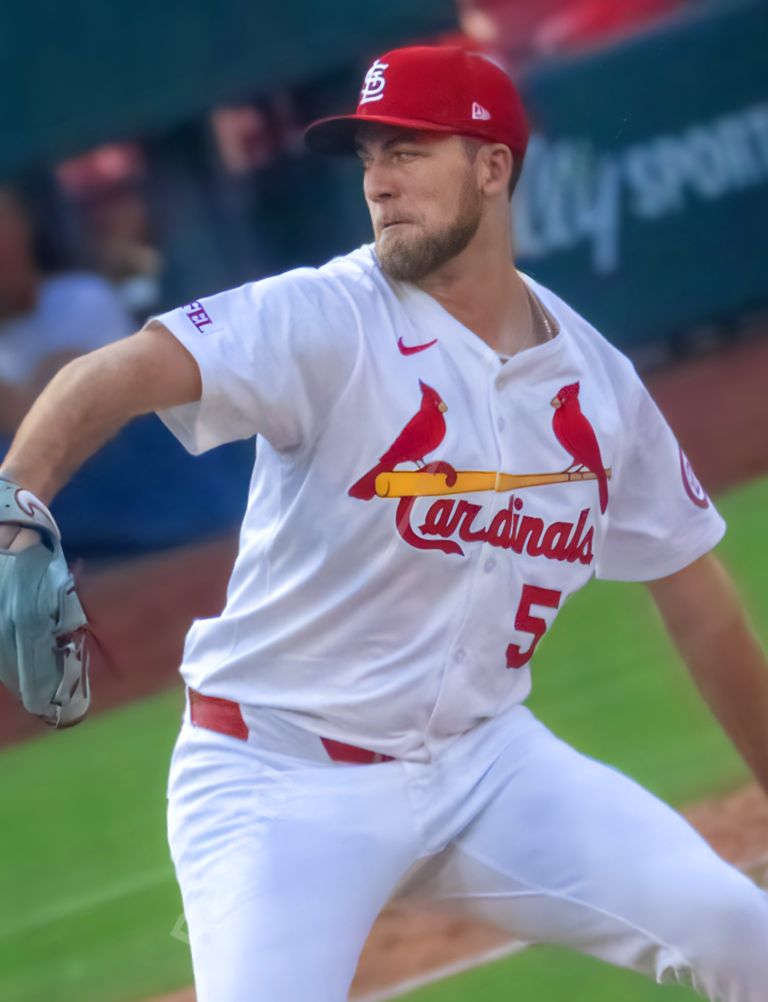
- Liberatore with the St.Louis Cardinals in 2024.

St. Louis Cardinals – No. 32
- Pitcher
- Born: November 6, 1999 (age 26); Peoria, Arizona, U.S.
- Bats: Left Throws: Left

MLB debut
- May 21, 2022, for the St. Louis Cardinals

MLB statistics (through 2026 season)
- Win–loss record: 22–38
- Earned run average: 4.82
- Strikeouts: 426
- Stats at Baseball Reference

Teams
- St. Louis Cardinals (2022–present)
Medals
Men's baseball
Representing United States
U-18 Baseball World Cup
Gold medal – first place	2017 Thunder Bay	Team

Matthew Joseph Liberatore (LIB-ər-ə-tor; born November 6, 1999) is an American professional baseball pitcher for the St. Louis Cardinals of Major League Baseball (MLB).

Born and raised in the suburbs of Phoenix, Arizona, Liberatore was selected by the Tampa Bay Rays in the first round of the 2018 Major League Baseball draft out of high school. He signed with the Rays and played in their minor league system for two seasons before he was traded to the Cardinals prior to the 2020 season. He played in their minor league system before making his MLB debut in 2022.

== Amateur career ==
Liberatore graduated from Mountain Ridge High School in Glendale, Arizona. In July 2017, he played in the Under Armour All-America Baseball Game and was named the game's most valuable player after throwing three scoreless innings. Later in the summer, he played for the USA Baseball 18U National Team. As a senior at Mountain Ridge in 2018, he posted an 8–1 win–loss record with a 0.93 earned run average (ERA) with 104 strikeouts in 60 1/3 innings and was named Arizona's Gatorade Baseball Player of the Year.

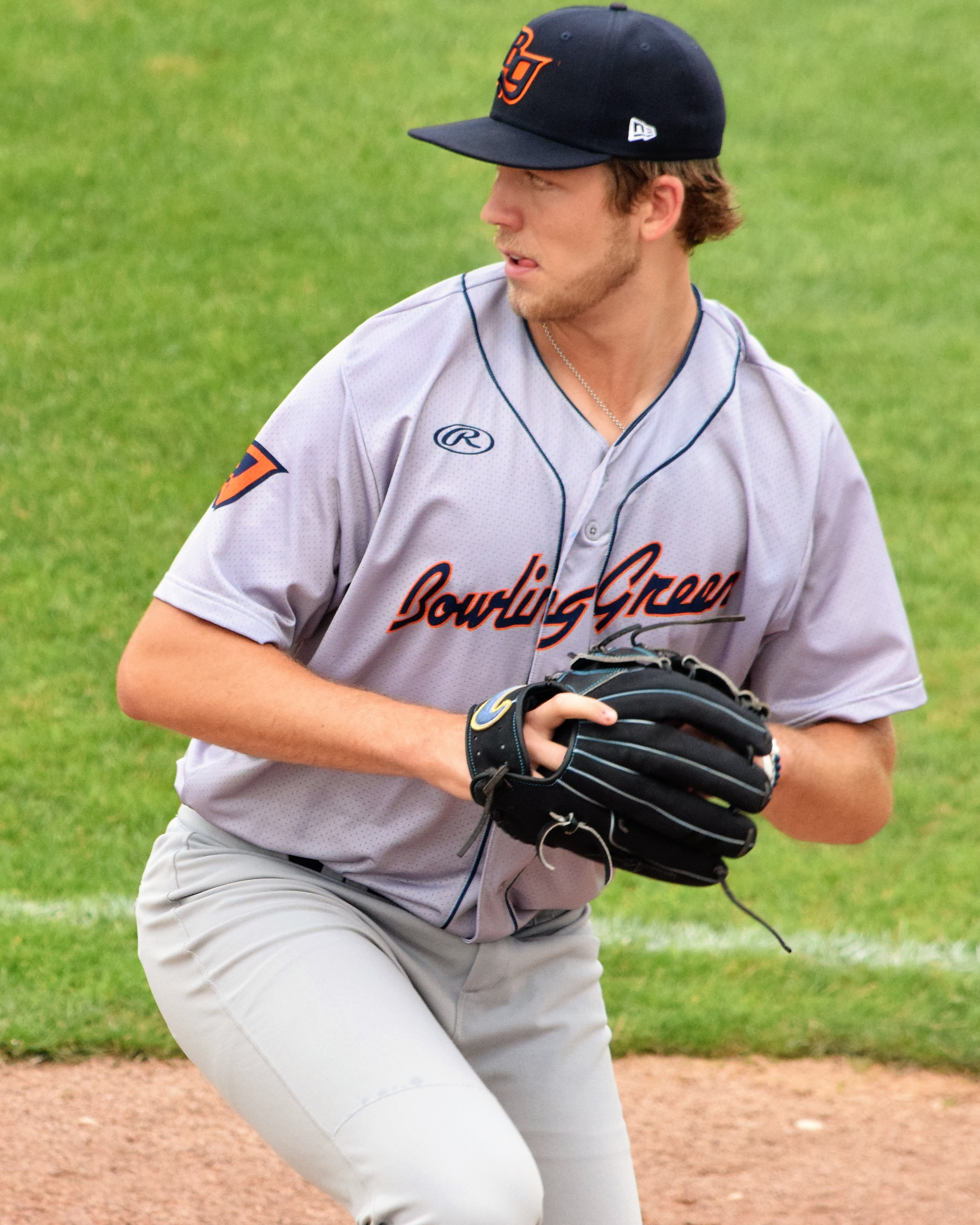
Liberatore with the Bowling Green Hot Rods in 2019

Liberatore committed to the University of Arizona to play college baseball.

In January 2024, Liberatore was inducted into the Mountain Ridge Athletics Hall of Fame.

== Professional career ==
=== Tampa Bay Rays ===
The Tampa Bay Rays selected Liberatore in the first round, with the 16th overall selection, in the 2018 Major League Baseball draft. He signed with the team for a $3.5 million signing bonus. He was assigned to the Gulf Coast Rays of the Rookie-level Gulf Coast League. After posting a 0.98 ERA in eight starts, Liberatore was promoted to the Princeton Rays of the Advanced Rookie Appalachian League. He pitched in one game for Princeton to close out his first professional season. Liberatore began the 2019 season in extended spring training before he was assigned to the Bowling Green Hot Rods of the Class A Midwest League on May 15, with whom he spent the remainder of the year. Over 16 games (15 starts), Liberatore went 6–2 with a 3.10 ERA, striking out 76 batters over 78 1/3 innings.

=== St. Louis Cardinals ===
On January 9, 2020, Liberatore was traded to the St. Louis Cardinals (along with Edgardo Rodriguez and the Rays' Competitive Balance Round B Draft Pick) in exchange for José Martínez, Randy Arozarena, and the Cardinals' Competitive Balance Round A Draft Pick. He did not play in a minor league game in 2020 due to the cancellation of the season due to the COVID-19 pandemic. For the 2021 season, Liberatore was assigned to the Memphis Redbirds of the Triple-A East.

In late May, he was placed on the temporarily inactive list while he competed for a spot on the United States national baseball team, in advance of the 2020 Summer Olympics. He was subsequently named to the roster of the national team for the Americas Qualifying Event. Team USA qualified for the Olympics, but Liberatore was ultimately not named to the roster in part due to the Cardinals' lack of organizational depth. In June, he was selected to represent the Cardinals (alongside Nolan Gorman) in the All-Star Futures Game at Coors Field. Over 22 games (18 starts) with Memphis, Liberatore went 9–9 with a 4.04 ERA and 123 strikeouts over 124 2/3 innings. The Cardinals named him their Minor League Pitcher of the Year.

Liberatore returned to Memphis to begin the 2022 season. After going 3–3 with a 3.83 ERA and 46 strikeouts over forty innings, the Cardinals announced on May 19 that they would be selecting his contract and promoting him to the major leagues. He made his MLB debut on May 21 as the starting pitcher versus the Pittsburgh Pirates, throwing 4 2/3 innings and giving up seven hits, four earned runs, and two walks while striking out three. They optioned him back to Memphis the next day, but he was recalled one day later after Steven Matz was placed on the injured list. On May 29, he earned his first career win, tossing 5.0 scoreless innings against the Milwaukee Brewers while striking out 6.

Liberatore was optioned to Triple-A Memphis to begin the 2023 season. Over 13 games (13 starts), Liberatore went 4–3 with a 4.18 ERA, striking out 84 batters over 64 2/3 innings. In the majors through the 2023 season, Liberatore posted a 3–6 record and a 4.40 ERA with 46 strikeouts in 61 2/3 innings.

In 2024, Liberatore posted a 3–4 record and a 3.70 ERA with 76 strikeouts in 86 innings, alternating between the starting rotation and the bullpen.

In 2025, Liberatore enjoyed sustained success, becoming a fixture in the Cardinals rotation and making 29 starts with a 4.21 ERA.

On January 14th, 2026, Liberatore switched to number 32, which he chose in honor of Hall of Famer Sandy Koufax, whom he grew up admiring.

== Personal life ==
Liberatore has been friends with fellow 2018 first-round pick and Cardinals teammate, Nolan Gorman, since they were five.

Liberatore and his wife, Natalie, were married in December 2024 in Arizona.
