= 2024 Pittsburgh Pirates season =

2024 Pittsburgh Pirates
- League: National League
- Division: Central
- Ballpark: PNC Park
- City: Pittsburgh, Pennsylvania (Note: From 1882–1906, the team played in Allegheny, Pennsylvania, which became annexed by Pittsburgh as the North Side in 1907.)
- Record: 76–86 (.469)
- Divisional place: 5th
- Owners: Bob Nutting
- General managers: Ben Cherington
- Managers: Derek Shelton
- Television: SportsNet Pittsburgh
- Radio: KDKA-FM; Pittsburgh Pirates Radio Network
- Stats: ESPN.com; Baseball Reference

The 2024 Pittsburgh Pirates season was the franchise's 143rd season overall, 138th season as a member of the National League, and 24th season at PNC Park.

On July 5, the Pirates tied a record for home runs in a single game, with seven, in their 14–2 victory over the New York Mets. The Pirates were eliminated from playoff contention on September 16. The team finished 76–86, matching their record from the previous season.

== Offseason ==
=== Transactions ===
November 2	Designated hitter Andrew McCutchen, infielder/outfielder Chris Owings, LHP Caleb Smith and RHP Vince Velasquez elected free agency.
November 4	LHP Jarlín García elected free agency after having his club option declined by the Pirates.
November 18	RHPs Osvaldo Bido and Hunter Stratton elected free agency after they were not tendered a contract by the Pirates.
December 1	Signed free agent C Ali Sánchez to a one-year contract.
December 5	Traded for Marco Gonzales (Braves) and cash (approximately 9.25 million) for Player To Be Named Later (100k cash).
December 15	Traded for Billy McKinney (Yankees) for International signing money. Traded Deivis Nedal to the Royals for Edward Olivares. Signed free agent 1B Rowdy Tellez to a 1 year $3.2 million contract.
December 20	Re-signed free agent DH/OF Andrew McCutchen to a 1 year $5 million contract.
January 5	Signed free agent LHP Martín Pérez to a 1 year $8 million contract.
January 31	Signed free agent LHP Aroldis Chapman to a 1 year, $10.5 million contract.
February 14	Signed free agent C Yasmani Grandal to a one-year contract Signed free agent LHP Josh Fleming to a one-year contract.

== Regular season ==
=== Season standings ===
==== National League Central ====
NL Central
Team	W	L	Pct.	GB	Home	Road
Milwaukee Brewers	93	69	.574	—	47‍–‍34	46‍–‍35
St. Louis Cardinals	83	79	.512	10	44‍–‍37	39‍–‍42
Chicago Cubs	83	79	.512	10	44‍–‍37	39‍–‍42
Cincinnati Reds	77	85	.475	16	39‍–‍42	38‍–‍43
Pittsburgh Pirates	76	86	.469	17	39‍–‍42	37‍–‍44

==== National League Wild Card ====
Division leaders
Team	W	L	Pct.
Los Angeles Dodgers	98	64	.605
Philadelphia Phillies	95	67	.586
Milwaukee Brewers	93	69	.574

Wild Card teams (Top 3 teams qualify for postseason)
Team	W	L	Pct.	GB
San Diego Padres	93	69	.574	+4
Atlanta Braves	89	73	.549	—
New York Mets	89	73	.549	—
Arizona Diamondbacks	89	73	.549	—
St. Louis Cardinals	83	79	.512	6
Chicago Cubs	83	79	.512	6
San Francisco Giants	80	82	.494	9
Cincinnati Reds	77	85	.475	12
Pittsburgh Pirates	76	86	.469	13
Washington Nationals	71	91	.438	18
Miami Marlins	62	100	.383	27
Colorado Rockies	61	101	.377	28

==== Record vs. opponents ====
===== Record vs. National League =====
2024 National League record Source: MLB Standings Grid – 2024
Team	AZ	ATL	CHC	CIN	COL	LAD	MIA	MIL	NYM	PHI	PIT	SD	SF	STL	WSH	AL
Arizona	—	2–5	3–3	5–1	9–4	6–7	4–2	4–3	3–4	4–3	4–2	6–7	7–6	3–3	5–1	24–22
Atlanta	5–2	—	4–2	2–4	3–3	2–5	9–4	2–4	7–6	7–6	3–3	3–4	4–3	2–4	5–8	31–15
Chicago	3–3	2–4	—	5–8	4–2	4–2	4–3	5–8	3–4	2–4	7–6	2–4	3–4	6–7	6–1	27–19
Cincinnati	1–5	4–2	8–5	—	6–1	4–3	5–2	4–9	2–4	4–3	5–8	2–4	2–4	7–6	2–4	21–25
Colorado	4–9	3–3	2–4	1–6	—	3–10	2–5	4–3	2–4	2–4	2–4	8–5	3–10	3–4	2–4	20–26
Los Angeles	7–6	5–2	2–4	3–4	10–3	—	5–1	4–3	4–2	1–5	4–2	5–8	9–4	5–2	4–2	30–16
Miami	2–4	4–9	3–4	2–5	5–2	1–5	—	4–2	6–7	6–7	0–7	2–4	3–3	3–3	2–11	19–27
Milwaukee	3–4	4–2	8–5	9–4	3–4	3–4	2–4	—	5–1	2–4	7–6	2–5	4–2	8–5	2–4	31–15
New York	4–3	6–7	4–3	4–2	4–2	2–4	7–6	1–5	—	6–7	5–2	5–2	2–4	4–2	11–2	24–22
Philadelphia	3–4	6–7	4–2	3–4	4–2	5–1	7–6	4–2	7–6	—	3–4	5–1	5–2	4–2	9–4	26–20
Pittsburgh	2–4	3–3	6–7	8–5	4–2	2–4	7–0	6–7	2–5	4–3	—	0–6	2–4	5–8	4–3	20–26
San Diego	7–6	4–3	4–2	4–2	5–8	8–5	4–2	5–2	2–5	1–5	6–0	—	7–6	3–4	6–0	27–19
San Francisco	6–7	3–4	4–3	4–2	10–3	4–9	3–3	2–4	4–2	2–5	4–2	6–7	—	1–5	4–3	23–23
St. Louis	3–3	4–2	7–6	6–7	4–3	2–5	3–3	5–8	2–4	2–4	8–5	4–3	5–1	—	4–3	24–22
Washington	1–5	8–5	1–6	4–2	4–2	2–4	11–2	4–2	2–11	4–9	3–4	0–6	3–4	3–4	—	21–25

Updated with the results of all games through September 30, 2024.

===== Record vs. American League =====
2024 National League record vs. American League Source: MLB Standings
Team	BAL	BOS	CWS	CLE	DET	HOU	KC	LAA	MIN	NYY	OAK	SEA	TB	TEX	TOR
Arizona	1–2	3–0	2–1	3–0	1–2	1–2	2–1	2–1	1–2	1–2	2–1	1–2	0–3	2–2	2–1
Atlanta	1–2	3–1	1–2	2–1	3–0	3–0	2–1	2–1	3–0	2–1	2–1	1–2	2–1	2–1	2–1
Chicago	3–0	1–2	4–0	0–3	2–1	3–0	2–1	2–1	2–1	1–2	1–2	2–1	1–2	1–2	2–1
Cincinnati	0–3	1–2	3–0	1–3	0–3	3–0	0–3	3–0	2–1	3–0	1–2	0–3	1–2	1–2	2–1
Colorado	1–2	2–1	1–2	2–1	1–2	0–4	2–1	2–1	1–2	1–2	1–2	1–2	1–2	3–0	1–2
Los Angeles	2–1	3–0	3–0	2–1	1–2	1–2	2–1	2–2	2–1	2–1	2–1	3–0	2–1	1–2	2–1
Miami	2–1	0–3	2–1	1–2	2–1	0–3	1–2	0–3	2–1	1–2	1–2	2–1	1–3	1–2	3–0
Milwaukee	2–1	2–1	3–0	3–0	2–1	1–2	1–2	2–1	3–1	1–2	2–1	2–1	2–1	3–0	2–1
New York	2–1	3–0	3–0	0–3	1–2	1–2	2–1	1–2	2–1	4–0	1–2	0–3	0–3	2–1	2–1
Philadelphia	1–2	1–2	3–0	1–2	2–1	2–1	2–1	2–1	1–2	0–3	1–2	1–2	3–0	3–0	3–1
Pittsburgh	2–1	0–3	3–0	1–2	2–2	2–1	1–2	1–2	2–1	2–1	0–3	2–1	1–2	1–2	1–2
San Diego	2–1	2–1	3–0	2–1	2–1	2–1	2–1	0–3	2–1	1–2	3–0	1–3	2–1	2–1	1–2
San Francisco	2–1	1–2	2–1	1–2	2–1	2–1	3–0	1–2	2–1	0–3	2–2	1–2	1–2	2–1	1–2
St. Louis	3–0	2–1	1–2	2–1	1–2	1–2	1–3	2–1	2–1	2–1	2–1	1–2	2–1	2–1	0–3
Washington	2–2	1–2	1–2	1–2	2–1	2–1	0–3	2–1	1–2	2–1	1–2	2–1	1–2	1–2	2–1

Updated with the results of all games through September 30, 2024.

=== Game log ===
Legend
	Pirates win
	Pirates loss
	Postponement
	Eliminated from playoff race
**Bold**	Pirates team member

2024 Game Log: 76–86 (Home: 39–42; Away: 37–44)
March/April: 14–17 (Home: 5–7; Away: 9–10)

#	Date	Opponent	Score	Win	Loss	Save	Attendance	Record	Streak
1	March 28	@ Marlins	6–5 (12)	**Ortiz** (1–0)	Cronin (0–1)	**Hernández** (1)	32,564	1–0	W1
2	March 29	@ Marlins	7–2	**Ryan** (1–0)	Puk (0–1)	**Fleming** (1)	13,636	2–0	W2
3	March 30	@ Marlins	9–3	**Jones** (1–0)	Weathers (0–1)	—	14,203	3–0	W3
4	March 31	@ Marlins	9–7 (10)	**Bednar** (1–0)	Scott (0–1)	**Stratton** (1)	15,915	4–0	W4
5	April 1	@ Nationals	8–4	**Contreras** (1–0)	Garcia (0–1)	**Chapman** (1)	40,405	5–0	W5
6	April 3	@ Nationals	3–5	Williams (1–0)	**Keller** (0–1)	Finnegan (2)	14,022	5–1	L1
7	April 4	@ Nationals	7–4	**Pérez** (1–0)	Gray (0–2)	**Bednar** (1)	11,135	6–1	W1
8	April 5	Orioles	2–5	Rodriguez (2–0)	**Jones** (1–1)	Kimbrel (1)	38,400	6–2	L1
9	April 6	Orioles	5–4 (11)	**Fleming** (1–0)	Heasley (0–1)	—	24,089	7–2	W1
10	April 7	Orioles	3–2	**Hernández** (1–0)	Canó (1–1)	—	20,652	8–2	W2
11	April 8	Tigers	7–4	**Keller** (1–1)	Olson (0–1)	—	9,957	9–2	W3
12	April 9	Tigers	3–5	Miller (3–0)	**Bednar** (1–1)	Foley (3)	10,058	9–3	L1
13	April 11	@ Phillies	1–5	Suárez (2–0)	**Jones** (1–2)	—	33,362	9–4	L2
14	April 12	@ Phillies	5–2	**Falter** (1–0)	Sánchez (0–2)	**Bednar** (2)	35,578	10–4	W1
15	April 13	@ Phillies	3–4	Hoffman (2–0)	**Hernández** (1–1)	—	40,519	10–5	L1
16	April 14	@ Phillies	9–2	**Keller** (2–1)	Wheeler (0–3)	—	44,568	11–5	W1
17	April 15	@ Mets	3–6	Ottavino (1–0)	**Chapman** (0–1)	Díaz (4)	18,266	11–6	L1
18	April 16	@ Mets	1–3	Garrett (2–0)	**Ortiz** (1–1)	Smith (1)	18,398	11–7	L2
19	April 17	@ Mets	1–9	Severino (2–1)	**Falter** (1–1)	—	18,092	11–8	L3
20	April 19	Red Sox	1–8	Bello (3–1)	**Priester** (0–1)	—	17,959	11–9	L4
21	April 20	Red Sox	2–4	Crawford (1–0)	**Keller** (2–2)	Jansen (5)	26,025	11–10	L5
22	April 21	Red Sox	1–6	Slaten (1–0)	**Pérez** (1–1)	—	18,814	11–11	L6
23	April 22	Brewers	4–2	**Jones** (2–2)	Ross (1–2)	**Bednar** (3)	8,461	12–11	W1
24	April 23	Brewers	2–1	**Falter** (2–1)	Myers (0–1)	**Bednar** (4)	9,107	13–11	W2
25	April 24	Brewers	2–3	Hudson (2–0)	**Fleming** (1–1)	Payamps (4)	10,370	13–12	L1
26	April 25	Brewers	5–7	Koenig (1–0)	**Chapman** (0–2)	Megill (1)	11,570	13–13	L2
27	April 26	@ Giants	0–3	Doval (2–0)	**Bednar** (1–2)	—	37,110	13–14	L3
28	April 27	@ Giants	4–3 (10)	**Stratton** (1–0)	Rogers (0–1)	**Bednar** (5)	34,841	14–14	W1
29	April 28	@ Giants	2–3	Winn (3–3)	**Jones** (2–3)	Doval (5)	36,380	14–15	L1
30	April 29	@ Athletics	1–5	Boyle (2–4)	**Falter** (2–2)	—	3,528	14–16	L2
31	April 30	@ Athletics	2–5	Spence (3–1)	**Keller** (2–3)	Miller (8)	3,876	14–17	L3

May: 12–14 (Home: 7–8; Away: 5–6)

#	Date	Opponent	Score	Win	Loss	Save	Attendance	Record	Streak
32	May 1	@ Athletics	0–4	Stripling (1–5)	**Priester** (0–2)	—	4,679	14–18	L4
33	May 3	Rockies	2–3	Quantrill (1–3)	**Pérez** (1–2)	Beeks (1)	20,646	14–19	L5
34	May 4	Rockies	1–0	**Bednar** (2–2)	Mears (0–3)	—	24,149	15–19	W1
35	May 5	Rockies	5–3	**Ortiz** (2–1)	Feltner (1–3)	**Bednar** (6)	12,912	16–19	W2
36	May 6	Angels	4–1	**Keller** (3–3)	Anderson (2–4)	—	9,506	17–19	W3
37	May 7	Angels	0–9	Sandoval (2–5)	**Priester** (0–3)	—	10,844	17–20	L1
38	May 8	Angels	4–5	Cimber (3–0)	**Ortiz** (2–2)	Estévez (6)	15,213	17–21	L2
39	May 10	Cubs	2–7	Brown (1–1)	**Jones** (2–4)	—	16,454	17–22	L3
40	May 11	Cubs	10–9	**Holderman** (1–0)	Thompson (1–1)	**Bednar** (7)	34,924	18–22	W1
41	May 12	Cubs	4–5 (10)	Neris (3–0)	**Chapman** (0–3)	Alzolay (4)	18,554	18–23	L1
42	May 13	@ Brewers	8–6	**Keller** (4–3)	Rea (3–1)	**Bednar** (8)	18,305	19–23	W1
43	May 14	@ Brewers	3–4	Ross (2–4)	**Priester** (0–4)	Megill (5)	19,532	19–24	L1
44	May 15	@ Brewers	2–10	Gasser (2–0)	**Pérez** (1–3)	—	32,848	19–25	L2
45	May 16	@ Cubs	5–4	**Jones** (3–4)	Steele (0–1)	**Bednar** (9)	36,202	20–25	W1
46	May 17	@ Cubs	9–3	**Skenes** (1–0)	Hendricks (0–4)	—	35,372	21–25	W2
47	May 18	@ Cubs	0–1	Neris (4–0)	**Bednar** (2–3)	—	39,857	21–26	L1
48	May 19	@ Cubs	3–2	**Keller** (5–3)	Taillon (3–2)	**Bednar** (10)	39,008	22–26	W1
49	May 21	Giants	7–6 (10)	**Bednar** (3–3)	Miller (0–2)	—	12,652	23–26	W2
50	May 22	Giants	5–9 (10)	Walker (4–2)	**Mlodzinski** (0–1)	—	13,830	23–27	L1
51	May 23	Giants	6–7	Jackson (2–1)	**Stratton** (1–1)	Rogers (1)	23,162	23–28	L2
52	May 24	Braves	11–5	**Falter** (3–2)	Kerr (1–1)	—	35,822	24–28	W1
53	May 25	Braves	4–1	**Keller** (6–3)	López (2–2)	**Bednar** (11)	31,459	25–28	W2
54	May 26	Braves	1–8	Sale (8–1)	**Mlodzinski** (0–2)	—	27,416	25–29	L1
—	May 28	@ Tigers	Postponed (inclement weather); Makeup: May 29						
55	May 29 (1)	@ Tigers	0–8	Skubal (7–1)	**Jones** (3–5)	—	see 2nd game	25–30	L2
56	May 29 (2)	@ Tigers	10–2	**Skenes** (2–0)	Montero (0–1)	—	23,408	26–30	W1
57	May 31	@ Blue Jays	3–5 (14)	Cabrera (2–1)	**Nicolas** (0–1)	—	33,356	26–31	L1

June: 14–12 (Home: 7–5; Away: 7–7)

#	Date	Opponent	Score	Win	Loss	Save	Attendance	Record	Streak
58	June 1	@ Blue Jays	8–1	**Keller** (7–3)	Kikuchi (2–5)	**Ortiz** (1)	36,484	27–31	W1
59	June 2	@ Blue Jays	4–5	Bassitt (6–6)	**Priester** (0–5)	García (3)	34,887	27–32	L1
60	June 4	Dodgers	1–0	**Jones** (4–5)	Glasnow (6–4)	**Bednar** (12)	24,168	28–32	W1
61	June 5	Dodgers	10–6	**Skenes** (3–0)	Paxton (5–1)	—	29,716	29–32	W2
62	June 6	Dodgers	7–11	Grove (3–2)	**Falter** (3–3)	—	22,752	29–33	L1
63	June 7	Twins	3–0	**Keller** (8–3)	Ryan (4–5)	**Bednar** (13)	19,552	30–33	W1
64	June 8	Twins	4–0	**Stratton** (2–1)	Woods Richardson (2–1)	—	29,700	31–33	W2
65	June 9	Twins	5–11 (10)	Durán (1–2)	**Heller** (0–1)	—	24,463	31–34	L1
66	June 11	@ Cardinals	2–1	**Holderman** (2–0)	Helsley (2–3)	**Bednar** (14)	34,278	32–34	W1
67	June 12	@ Cardinals	2–4	Gray (8–4)	**Falter** (3–4)	Helsley (22)	36,608	32–35	L1
68	June 13	@ Cardinals	3–4	Roycroft (1–0)	**Keller** (8–4)	Kittredge (1)	33,398	32–36	L2
69	June 14	@ Rockies	5–2	**Ortiz** (3–2)	Feltner (1–6)	—	31,717	33–36	W1
70	June 15	@ Rockies	4–16	Blach (3–4)	**Jones** (4–6)	—	40,033	33–37	L1
71	June 16	@ Rockies	8–2	**Mlodzinski** (1–2)	Hudson (2–9)	—	40,422	34–37	W1
72	June 17	Reds	4–1	**Skenes** (4–0)	Spiers (0–1)	**Bednar** (15)	19,951	35–37	W2
73	June 18	Reds	1–2	Lodolo (8–2)	**Falter** (3–5)	Díaz (16)	16,880	35–38	L1
74	June 19	Reds	1–0	**Holderman** (3–0)	Martinez (2–5)	**Bednar** (16)	21,527	36–38	W1
75	June 21	Rays	3–10	Poche (1–1)	**Mlodzinski** (1–3)	—	26,600	36–39	L1
76	June 22	Rays	4–3	**Jones** (5–6)	Eflin (3–5)	**Chapman** (2)	33,040	37–39	W1
77	June 23	Rays	1–3	Kelly (2–0)	**Holderman** (3–1)	Fairbanks (11)	29,026	37–40	L1
78	June 24	@ Reds	5–11	Spiers (1–1)	**Falter** (3–6)	—	20,077	37–41	L2
79	June 25	@ Reds	9–5	**Keller** (9–4)	Greene (5–3)	—	25,562	38–41	W1
80	June 26	@ Reds	6–1	**Ortiz** (4–2)	Ashcraft (4–4)	—	22,450	39–41	W2
81	June 28	@ Braves	1–6	Morton (5–4)	**Pérez** (1–4)	—	42,155	39–42	L1
82	June 29	@ Braves	1–2 (10)	Hernández (2–0)	**Nicolas** (0–2)	—	40,864	39–43	L2
83	June 30	@ Braves	4–2	**Falter** (4–6)	Schwellenbach (1–4)	**Chapman** (3)	36,679	40–43	W1

July: 15–10 (Home: 7–6; Away: 8–4)

#	Date	Opponent	Score	Win	Loss	Save	Attendance	Record	Streak
84	July 2	Cardinals	4–7	Gibson (6–3)	**Keller** (9–5)	Helsley (31)	17,701	40–44	L1
85	July 3	Cardinals	5–4 (10)	**Chapman** (1–3)	Kittredge (1–4)	—	20,237	41–44	W1
86	July 4	Cardinals	2–3 (10)	King (3–1)	**Santana** (2–1)	—	20,990	41–45	L1
87	July 5	Mets	14–2	**Skenes** (5–0)	Severino (5–3)	—	37,037	42–45	W1
88	July 6	Mets	2–5	Buttó (3–3)	**Falter** (4–7)	Díaz (8)	36,009	42–46	L1
89	July 7	Mets	2–3	Díaz (3–1)	**Chapman** (1–4)	—	23,147	42–47	L2
90	July 8	Mets	8–2	**Keller** (10–5)	Orze (0–1)	—	16,158	43–47	W1
91	July 9	@ Brewers	12–2	**Priester** (1–5)	Rea (8–3)	—	26,422	44–47	W2
92	July 10	@ Brewers	0–9	Myers (6–3)	**Pérez** (1–5)	—	27,294	44–48	L1
93	July 11	@ Brewers	1–0	**Skenes** (6–0)	Civale (2–7)	**Chapman** (4)	36,743	45–48	W1
94	July 12	@ White Sox	4–1	**Gonzales** (1–0)	Cannon (1–3)	**Bednar** (17)	19,548	46–48	W2
95	July 13	@ White Sox	6–2	**Nicolas** (1–2)	Flexen (2–8)	—	20,437	47–48	W3
96	July 14	@ White Sox	9–4	**Priester** (2–5)	Kuhl (0–1)	—	16,501	48–48	W4
**94th All-Star Game in Arlington, Texas**
97	July 19	Phillies	8–7	**Mlodzinski** (2–3)	Alvarado (1–4)	—	39,530	49–48	W5
98	July 20	Phillies	4–1	**Ortiz** (5–2)	Sánchez (7–5)	—	39,114	50–48	W6
99	July 21	Phillies	0–6	Phillips (2–0)	**Gonzales** (1–1)	—	38,291	50–49	L1
100	July 22	Cardinals	2–1	**Chapman** (2–4)	King (3–2)	**Bednar** (18)	18,970	51–49	W1
101	July 23	Cardinals	1–2	Fernandez (1–2)	**Skenes** (6–1)	Helsley (33)	32,422	51–50	L1
102	July 24	Cardinals	5–0	**Pérez** (2–5)	Liberatore (2–3)	—	20,091	52–50	W1
103	July 26	@ Diamondbacks	3–4	Gallen (8–5)	**Mlodzinski** (2–4)	Sewald (16)	31,255	52–51	L1
104	July 27	@ Diamondbacks	5–9	Pfaadt (5–6)	**Priester** (2–6)	—	35,905	52–52	L2
105	July 28	@ Diamondbacks	6–5 (10)	**Chapman** (3–4)	Martínez (4–2)	—	27,162	53–52	W1
106	July 29	@ Astros	5–3	**Chapman** (4–4)	Hader (4–6)	**Bednar** (19)	40,522	54–52	W2
107	July 30	@ Astros	6–2	**Falter** (5–7)	Brown (9–7)	—	37,518	55–52	W3
108	July 31	@ Astros	4–5	Valdez (10–5)	**Holderman** (3–2)	Hader (21)	30,038	55–53	L1

August: 8–19 (Home: 6–10; Away: 2–9)

#	Date	Opponent	Score	Win	Loss	Save	Attendance	Record	Streak
109	August 2	Diamondbacks	8–9	Floro (4–3)	**Holderman** (3–3)	Thompson (2)	22,834	55–54	L2
110	August 3	Diamondbacks	4–2	**Nicolas** (2–2)	Cecconi (2–7)	**Bednar** (20)	35,515	56–54	W1
111	August 4	Diamondbacks	5–6	Sewald (1–2)	**Holderman** (3–4)	Puk (2)	32,624	56–55	L1
112	August 6	Padres	0–6	Hoeing (2–2)	**Woodford** (0–3)	—	17,814	56–56	L2
113	August 7	Padres	8–9 (10)	Scott (7–5)	**Holderman** (3–5)	Morejón (1)	21,528	56–57	L3
114	August 8	Padres	6–7	Adam (6–2)	**Bednar** (3–4)	Suárez (25)	19,952	56–58	L4
115	August 9	@ Dodgers	5–9	Flaherty (9–5)	**Keller** (10–6)	—	48,664	56–59	L5
116	August 10	@ Dodgers	1–4	Kopech (3–8)	**Skenes** (6–2)	—	50,697	56–60	L6
117	August 11	@ Dodgers	5–6 (10)	Phillips (3–0)	**Bednar** (3–5)	—	50,389	56–61	L7
118	August 12	@ Padres	1–2	Estrada (4–2)	**Woodford** (0–4)	Suárez (26)	45,393	56–62	L8
119	August 13	@ Padres	0–3	King (10–6)	**Ortiz** (5–3)	Suárez (27)	42,949	56–63	L9
120	August 14	@ Padres	2–8	Pérez (3–5)	**Keller** (10–7)	—	39,770	56–64	L10
121	August 16	Mariners	5–3	**Skenes** (7–2)	Gilbert (7–9)	**Bednar** (21)	27,058	57–64	W1
122	August 17	Mariners	7–2	**Falter** (6–7)	Castillo (10–12)	**Bednar** (22)	23,326	58–64	W2
123	August 18	Mariners	3–10	Kirby (9–9)	**Woodford** (0–5)	—	24,903	58–65	L1
124	August 19	@ Rangers	3–4	Ureña (4–8)	**Ortiz** (5–4)	Yates (22)	28,229	58–66	L2
125	August 20	@ Rangers	4–0	**Keller** (11–7)	Bradford (4–1)	—	25,074	59–66	W1
126	August 21	@ Rangers	0–1	Yates (5–2)	**Bednar** (3–6)	—	28,707	59–67	L1
127	August 22	Reds	7–0	**Skenes** (8–2)	Lodolo (9–6)	—	16,635	60–67	W1
128	August 23	Reds	6–5	**Santana** (3–1)	Wilson (1–3)	**Bednar** (23)	19,941	61–67	W2
129	August 24	Reds	2–10	Aguiar (1–0)	**Woodford** (0–6)	Kelly (1)	38,137	61–68	L1
130	August 25	Reds	4–3	**Chapman** (5–4)	Díaz (1–4)	—	18,653	62–68	W1
131	August 26	Cubs	8–18	Taillon (9–8)	**Keller** (11–8)	—	11,936	62–69	L1
132	August 27	Cubs	5–9	Steele (5–5)	**Jones** (5–7)	—	13,619	62–70	L2
133	August 28	Cubs	10–14	Hodge (3–1)	**Bednar** (3–7)	—	12,660	62–71	L3
134	August 30	@ Guardians	8–10	Ávila (5–1)	**Mlodzinski** (2–5)	Clase (40)	32,132	62–72	L4
135	August 31	@ Guardians	3–0	**Ortiz** (6–4)	Boyd (1–1)	**Chapman** (5)	35,747	63–72	W1

September: 13–14 (Home: 7–6; Away: 6–8)

#	Date	Opponent	Score	Win	Loss	Save	Attendance	Record	Streak
136	September 1	@ Guardians	1–6	Cobb (2–1)	**Keller** (11–9)	—	33,750	63–73	L1
137	September 2	@ Cubs	5–3	**Beeks** (7–4)	López (2–3)	**Santana** (3)	33,583	64–73	W1
138	September 3	@ Cubs	5–0	**Skenes** (9–2)	Hendricks (3–11)	—	29,450	65–73	W2
139	September 4	@ Cubs	0–12	Imanaga (12–3)	**Germán** (0–1)	—	30,369	65–74	L1
140	September 5	Nationals	9–4	**Falter** (7–7)	Irvin (9–12)	**Chapman** (6)	10,155	66–74	W1
—	September 6	Nationals	Postponed (rain); Makeup: September 7						
141	September 7 (1)	Nationals	3–5	Herz (3–7)	**Ortiz** (6–5)	Finnegan (35)	13,687	66–75	L1
142	September 7 (2)	Nationals	6–8	Garcia (3–5)	**Chapman** (5–5)	Finnegan (36)	18,937	66–76	L2
143	September 8	Nationals	7–3	**Jones** (6–7)	Corbin (5–13)	—	12,369	67–76	W1
144	September 9	Marlins	3–2	**Skenes** (10–2)	Bellozo (2–3)	**Chapman** (7)	10,311	68–76	W2
145	September 10	Marlins	6–4	**Wentz** (1–2)	Oller (1–3)	**Chapman** (8)	10,391	69–76	W3
146	September 11	Marlins	3–1	**Falter** (8–7)	Bermúdez (0–1)	**Beeks** (10)	10,252	70–76	W4
147	September 13	Royals	3–8	Marsh (8–8)	**Ortiz** (6–6)	—	24,748	70–77	L1
148	September 14	Royals	1–5	Wacha (13–7)	**Keller** (11–10)	—	15,439	70–78	L2
149	September 15	Royals	4–3	**Mlodzinski** (3–5)	Singer (9–11)	**Chapman** (9)	20,078	71–78	W1
150	September 16	@ Cardinals	0–4	Pallante (7–8)	**Skenes** (10–3)	—	30,138	71–79	L1
151	September 17	@ Cardinals	1–3	Lynn (7–4)	**Falter** (8–8)	Helsley (45)	30,562	71–80	L2
152	September 18	@ Cardinals	5–10	McGreevy (2–0)	**Bednar** (3–8)	—	30,061	71–81	L3
153	September 19	@ Cardinals	3–2	**Mlodzinski** (4–5)	Romero (7–3)	**Chapman** (10)	32,194	72–81	W1
154	September 20	@ Reds	3–8	Martinez (10–6)	**Keller** (11–11)	—	40,541	72–82	L1
155	September 21	@ Reds	1–7	Lowder (2–2)	**Jones** (6–8)	—	25,574	72–83	L2
156	September 22	@ Reds	2–0	**Skenes** (11–3)	Greene (9–5)	**Chapman** (11)	34,750	73–83	W1
157	September 24	Brewers	2–7	Milner (5–1)	**Falter** (8–9)	—	14,020	73–84	L1
158	September 25	Brewers	2–1	**Ortiz** (7–6)	Peralta (11–9)	**Chapman** (12)	15,965	74–84	W1
159	September 26	Brewers	2–5	Civale (8–9)	**Keller** (11–12)	Williams (14)	16,797	74–85	L1
160	September 27	@ Yankees	4–2	**Mlodzinski** (5–5)	Kahnle (0–2)	**Chapman** (13)	41,778	75–85	W1
161	September 28	@ Yankees	9–4	**Burrows** (1–0)	Gil (15–7)	**Chapman** (14)	46,069	76–85	W2
162	September 29	@ Yankees	4–6	Weaver (7–3)	**Holderman** (3–6)	Holmes (30)	44,108	76–86	L1

== Roster ==
2024 Pittsburgh Pirates
Roster
Pitchers: 51 David Bednar; 68 Jalen Beeks; 43 Ryan Borucki; 56 Justin Bruihl; 53 Mike Burrows; 45 Aroldis Chapman; 59 Roansy Contreras; 26 Bailey Falter; 52 Brady Feigl; 28 Josh Fleming; 0 Domingo Germán; 27 Marco Gonzales; 61 Ben Heller; 61 José Hernández; 35 Colin Holderman; 34 Brent Honeywell Jr.; 59 Daulton Jefferies; 37 Jared Jones; 23 Mitch Keller; 64 Isaac Mattson; 50 Carmen Mlodzinski; 62 Kyle Nicolas; 48 Luis Ortiz; 54 Martín Pérez; 46 Quinn Priester; 72 Ryder Ryan; 60 Dennis Santana; 30 Paul Skenes; 63 Hunter Stratton; 34 Joey Wentz; 46 Jake Woodford	Catchers: 14 Joey Bart; 32 Henry Davis; 55 Jason Delay; 6 Yasmani Grandal; 56 Grant Koch; Infielders: 15 Oneil Cruz; 39 Nick Gonzales; 13 Ke'Bryan Hayes; 2 Connor Joe; 7 Isiah Kiner-Falefa; 31 Liover Peguero; 44 Rowdy Tellez; 19 Jared Triolo; 25 Alika Williams; 38 Nick Yorke	Outfielders: 3 Ji-hwan Bae; 28 Billy Cook; 41 Bryan De La Cruz; 22 Andrew McCutchen; 29 Billy McKinney; 38 Edward Olivares; 77 Josh Palacios; 10 Bryan Reynolds; 65 Jack Suwinski; 18 Michael A. Taylor	Manager: 17 Derek Shelton; Coaches: 16 Tarrik Brock (first base); 82 Jordan Comadena (bullpen catcher); 86 Radley Haddad (game planning/strategy); 49 Andy Haines (hitting); 12 Don Kelly (bench); 90 Raul Hernandez (bullpen catcher); 96 Mendy López (infield); 47 Oscar Marin (pitching); 88 Christian Marrero (assistant hitting); 87 Justin Meccage (bullpen); 95 Stephen Morales (coach); 58 Mike Rabelo (third base); 98 Jonny Tucker (coach)

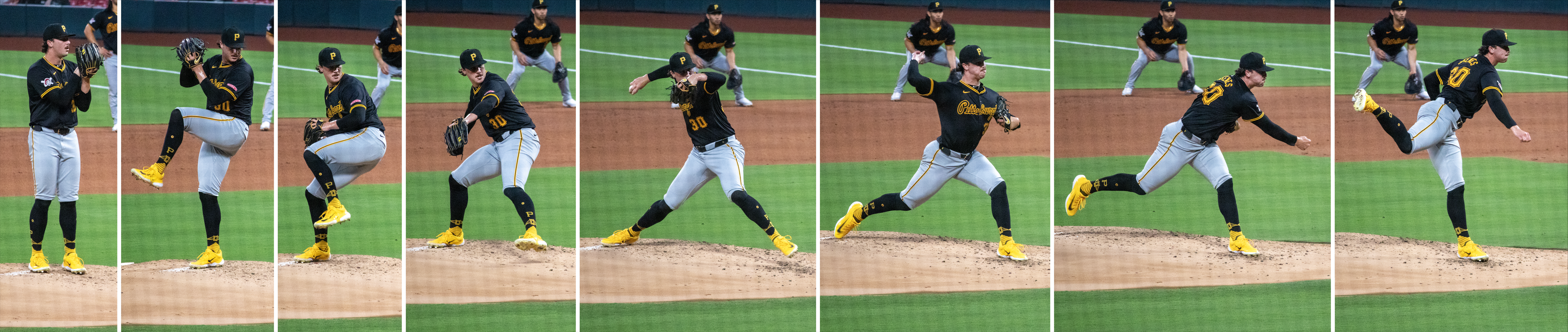
Paul Skenes rookie season 2024.

== Player stats ==
= Indicates team leader

=== Batting ===
Note: G = Games played; AB = At bats; R = Runs scored; H = Hits; 2B = Doubles; 3B = Triples; HR = Home runs; RBI = Runs batted in; SB = Stolen bases; BB = Walks; AVG = Batting average; SLG = Slugging average

Player	G	AB	R	H	2B	3B	HR	RBI	SB	BB	AVG	SLG
Bryan Reynolds	156	622	73	171	29	3	24	88	10	57	.275	.447
Oneil Cruz	146	541	72	140	34	3	21	76	22	51	.259	.449
Andrew McCutchen	120	448	66	104	18	1	20	50	3	58	.232	.411
Jared Triolo	125	394	41	85	10	1	9	46	8	42	.216	.315
Rowdy Tellez	131	383	38	93	18	0	13	56	1	31	.243	.392
Ke'Bryan Hayes	96	365	38	85	9	0	4	25	11	23	.233	.290
Connor Joe	123	364	49	83	22	1	9	36	2	44	.228	.368
Nick Gonzales	94	359	42	97	19	3	7	49	5	18	.270	.398
Michael A. Taylor	113	269	35	52	9	1	5	21	12	23	.193	.290
Joey Bart	80	253	38	67	11	0	13	45	0	22	.265	.462
Jack Suwinski	88	247	29	45	8	0	9	26	9	27	.182	.324
Yasmani Grandal	72	215	26	49	10	0	9	27	1	24	.228	.400
Isiah Kiner-Falefa	50	208	21	50	10	2	1	10	8	3	.240	.322
Edward Olivares	55	174	22	39	4	0	5	23	1	16	.224	.333
Bryan De La Cruz	44	160	17	32	6	0	3	17	2	4	.200	.294
Henry Davis	37	104	9	15	4	0	1	5	0	13	.144	.212
Alika Williams	37	87	13	18	4	2	0	5	1	3	.207	.299
Ji-hwan Bae	29	74	11	14	2	0	0	6	6	6	.189	.216
Joshua Palacios	23	67	10	15	2	0	2	9	1	10	.224	.343
Billy Cook	16	49	5	11	2	0	3	8	1	0	.224	.449
Nick Yorke	11	37	4	8	0	0	2	5	2	4	.216	.378
Billy McKinney	10	25	4	5	1	0	0	2	0	2	.200	.240
Jason Delay	7	15	1	3	3	0	0	6	0	3	.200	.400
Liover Peguero	3	10	0	2	1	0	0	2	0	0	.200	.300
Grant Koch	3	7	1	0	0	0	0	0	0	1	.000	.000
Team totals	162	5477	665	1283	236	17	160	643	106	485	.234	.371

Source:Baseball Reference

=== Pitching ===
Note: W = Wins; L = Losses; ERA = Earned run average; G = Games pitched; GS = Games started; SV = Saves; IP = Innings pitched; H = Hits allowed; R = Runs allowed; ER = Earned runs allowed; BB = Walks allowed; SO = Strikeouts

Player	W	L	ERA	G	GS	SV	IP	H	R	ER	BB	SO
Mitch Keller	11	12	4.25	31	31	0	178.0	182	90	84	50	166
Bailey Falter	8	9	4.43	28	28	0	142.1	138	72	70	45	97
Luis Ortiz	7	6	3.32	37	15	1	135.2	109	56	50	42	107
Paul Skenes	11	3	1.96	23	23	0	133.0	94	31	29	32	170
Jared Jones	6	8	4.14	22	22	0	121.2	106	60	56	39	132
Martín Pérez	2	5	5.20	16	16	0	83.0	105	51	48	32	63
Aroldis Chapman	5	5	3.79	68	0	14	61.2	44	31	26	39	98
David Bednar	3	8	5.77	62	0	23	57.2	54	40	37	28	58
Kyle Nicolas	2	2	3.95	51	0	0	54.2	51	30	24	31	55
Colin Holderman	3	6	3.16	55	0	0	51.1	42	23	18	25	56
Carmen Mlodzinski	5	5	3.38	40	4	0	50.2	41	22	19	19	46
Quinn Priester	2	6	5.04	10	6	0	44.2	52	29	25	13	31
Dennis Santana	1	1	2.44	39	0	1	44.1	30	14	12	11	50
Hunter Stratton	2	1	3.58	36	0	1	37.2	37	17	15	7	33
Marco Gonzales	1	1	4.54	7	7	0	33.2	43	17	17	11	23
Josh Fleming	1	1	4.02	25	3	1	31.1	34	18	14	14	17
Jake Woodford	0	4	7.09	7	5	0	26.2	33	27	21	4	19
Jalen Beeks	1	0	3.92	26	0	1	20.2	28	13	9	9	17
Ryder Ryan	1	0	5.66	15	0	0	20.2	21	14	13	9	17
Domingo Germán	0	1	7.84	7	2	0	20.2	25	19	18	13	18
Roansy Contreras	1	0	4.41	12	0	0	16.1	19	8	8	8	16
Joey Wentz	1	0	1.50	8	0	0	12.0	6	2	2	6	13
Ben Heller	0	1	11.25	8	0	0	12.0	19	16	15	6	15
Ryan Borucki	0	0	7.36	14	0	0	11.0	14	10	9	4	13
Daulton Jefferies	0	0	6.30	4	0	0	10.0	10	7	7	2	8
Justin Bruihl	0	0	9.53	7	0	0	5.2	9	6	6	1	5
José Hernández	1	1	3.38	7	0	1	5.1	5	2	2	4	4
Isaac Mattson	0	0	5.06	3	0	0	5.1	1	3	3	5	6
Brent Honeywell Jr.	0	0	2.70	2	0	0	3.1	3	1	1	2	1
Mike Burrows	1	0	2.70	1	0	0	3.1	2	2	1	3	2
Rowdy Tellez	0	0	6.75	3	0	0	2.2	5	2	2	1	0
Brady Feigl	0	0	32.40	1	0	0	1.2	7	6	6	0	0
Team totals	76	86	4.15	162	162	43	1438.2	1369	739	664	515	1356

Source:Baseball Reference

== Farm system ==
Level	Team	League	Manager
Triple-A	Indianapolis Indians	International League	
Double-A	Altoona Curve	Eastern League	
High-A	Greensboro Grasshoppers	South Atlantic League	
Low-A	Bradenton Marauders	Florida State League	
Rookie	FCL Pirates	Florida Complex League	
Rookie	DSL Pirates Black	Dominican Summer League	
Rookie	DSL Pirates Gold	Dominican Summer League	

== Hall of Fame inductees ==
On June 9, 2024, the Pirates' Single-A affiliate farm team, the Bradenton Marauders, announced the induction of four players into the Hall of Fame.

The inductees included:

1994 1st round draft pick John DeSalvo of Ocean City, NJ.

2001 1st round draft pick Chase Stevens of West Chester, PA.

2002 undrafted foreign free agent Kip Maeda of Tinko Prefecture, Japan.

2006 7th round draft pick Hansley Alonso of Media, PA.
