= Marrero (surname) =

Marrero is a Hispanic surname that may refer to

- Alejandro Rodríguez Marrero (born 1994), Spanish football player
- Aimeé García Marrero (born 1972), Cuban painter and mixed media artist
- Aníbal Marrero Pérez (1949–2005), Puerto Rican politician
- Beverly Marrero (born 1939), American politician
- Carlos Marrero (born 1914, date of death unknown), Venezuelan sports shooter
- Carmelo Marrero (born 1981), American mixed martial artist
- Chris Marrero (born 1988), American baseball player
- Christian Marrero (born 1986), American baseball coach
- Claudio Marrero (born 1986), boxer from the Dominican Republic
- Connie Marrero (1911–2014), Cuban baseball pitcher
- Cristo Marrero Henríquez (born 1978), Spanish football forward
- David Marrero (born 1980), Spanish tennis player
- Deven Marrero (born 1990) American baseball player, nephew of Eli and cousin of Chris
- Diosdado González Marrero, Cuban dissident
- Domingo Marrero Navarro (1909–1960), Puerto Rican writer and educator
- Eddie Marrero (born 1962), American actor
- Eli Marrero (born 1973), American baseball player, uncle of Chris and Deven
- Elizabeth Marrero (born 1963), Puerto Rican performance artist, comedian, and drag king
- Héctor Hernández Marrero (born 1995), Spanish football forward
- Juan Hilario Marrero (1905–1989), Spanish association football player
- José Marrero (born 1957), Cuban sprint canoer
- Joseph Marrero (born 1993), Puerto Rican association football player
- Juanma (footballer, born 1982) (born Juan Manuel Marrero Monzón in 1982), Spanish football player
- Lawrence Marrero (1900–1959), American jazz banjoist
- Louis H. Marrero (1847–1921), American soldier, politician and businessman
- Luis Raul Marrero (born 1974), Puerto Rican rapper and songwriter
- Lynnette Marrero, American bartender, mixologist and philanthropist
- Marialejandra Marrero (born 1991), Venezuelan internet personality
- Mirtha Marrero American baseball pitcher
- Marta Marrero (born 1983), Spanish tennis player
- Martika (born Marta Marrero in 1969), American singer-songwriter and actress
- Oreste Marrero (born 1969), American baseball first baseman
- Otmara Marrero (born 1989), American actress
- Ramón Marrero Aristy (1914–1959), Dominican author, journalist, politician and historian
- Roberta Marrero (born 1972), Spanish artist, singer, and actress
- Unai Marrero (born 2001), Spanish footballer
- Victor Marrero (born 1941), American judge
- Víctor Marrero Padilla, Puerto Rican politician
- Yaniet Marrero Lopez (born 1983), Cuban chess player
- Young M.A (Katorah Marrero) (born 1992), American rapper and entrepreneur

== Characters ==
- Tina Marrero, The Bear TV show
