= Marrero =

Marrero may refer to:

- Marrero (surname)
- Marrero, Louisiana, a census-designated place in the United States
- Estadio Pedro Marrero, a multi-purpose stadium in Havana, Cuba
