= Joey Bart =

American baseball player (born 1996)

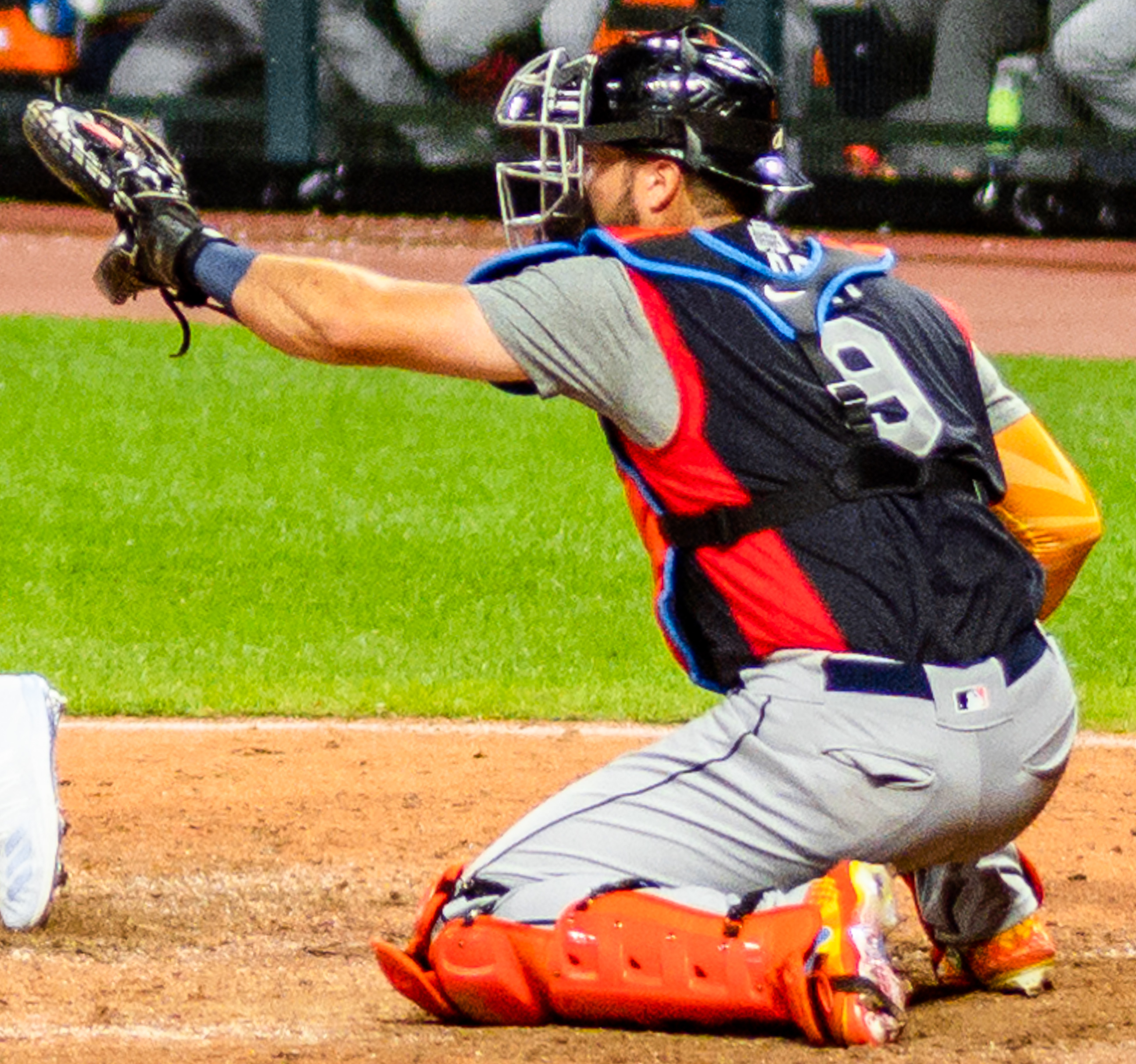
- Bart in the 2019 All-Star Futures Game

Chicago Cubs
- Catcher
- Born: December 15, 1996 (age 29); Buford, Georgia, U.S.
- Bats: Right Throws: Right

MLB debut
- August 20, 2020, for the San Francisco Giants

MLB statistics (through 2026 season)
- Batting average: .237
- Home runs: 32
- Runs batted in: 126
- Stats at Baseball Reference

Teams
- San Francisco Giants (2020–2023); Pittsburgh Pirates (2024–2026); Atlanta Braves (2026); Chicago White Sox (2026)

Joseph Andrew Bart (born December 15, 1996) is an American professional baseball catcher for the Chicago Cubs of Major League Baseball (MLB). He has previously played in MLB for the San Francisco Giants, Pittsburgh Pirates, Atlanta Braves, and Chicago White Sox.

Bart played college baseball for the Georgia Tech Yellow Jackets. He won the Johnny Bench Award in 2018 as the best collegiate catcher. The Giants chose him with the second overall pick of the 2018 MLB draft and he made his MLB debut in 2020. The Giants traded Bart to the Pirates in 2024.

== Amateur career ==
Bart attended Buford High School in Buford, Georgia. He was the starting catcher for the school's baseball team in his freshman year. He had a .556 on-base percentage and a .859 slugging percentage in his junior year, but was pitched around by opposing teams in his senior year, decreasing his performance. Buford HS won the Georgia Class 4A State Championship his senior year going 34–2 and finishing ranked as 8th in the MaxPreps National Poll. The Tampa Bay Rays selected Bart in the 27th round of the 2015 Major League Baseball draft, but he opted not to sign.

Bart enrolled at the Georgia Institute of Technology to play college baseball for the Georgia Tech Yellow Jackets and majored in business administration. After his freshman year in 2016, he played collegiate summer baseball with the Wareham Gatemen of the Cape Cod Baseball League (CCBL), where he was named a league all-star. He was named to the Johnny Bench Award watch list in his sophomore year, but he missed the last 11 games of his sophomore season with a broken finger. Following his sophomore season, he played for the United States national collegiate baseball team, and returned to the CCBL to play with the Harwich Mariners.

In 2018, his junior year, Bart had a .359 batting average, the best in the Atlantic Coast Conference (ACC), a .632 slugging percentage, the second-highest in the ACC, and a .471 on base percentage, third-highest in the conference, along with 16 home runs (5th) and 55 runs (9th). He was named to the Golden Spikes Award watch list, and was named the Atlantic Coast Conference's Baseball Player of the Year. Bart also won the Johnny Bench Award.

== Professional career ==
=== San Francisco Giants ===
==== Minor leagues ====
Considered a top prospect in the 2018 Major League Baseball draft, the San Francisco Giants selected Bart with the second overall pick. He signed with the Giants for $7,025,000, the largest signing bonus ever for a position player.

Due to the layoff following the college season, the Giants sent Bart to their Scottsdale, Arizona, facility, before assigning him to the Salem-Keizer Volcanoes of the Class A Short Season Northwest League. In 45 games and 181 at bats for Salem-Keizer, Bart slashed .298/.369/.613 (leading the Northwest League) with 13 home runs (3rd) and 39 runs batted in (RBIs; 5th), as he also was second in the league in hit-by-pitch, with 9. He was named an NWL mid-season All Star, a NWL post-season All Star, a Baseball America Short-Season All Star, and a 2018 MiLB.com Organization All Star.

The Giants invited Bart to spring training as a non-roster player in 2019. Bart began the 2019 season with the San Jose Giants of the Class A-Advanced California League. He broke his hand on a hit by pitch on April 15 and was on the injured list until June 4. Bart was named to the 2019 All-Star Futures Game. In August, the Giants promoted Bart to the Richmond Flying Squirrels of the Class AA Eastern League, with whom he finished the year. Over 79 games and 313 at bats between the two clubs, Bart slashed .278/.328/.495 with 16 home runs and 48 RBIs. He played in the Arizona Fall League for the Scottsdale Scorpions following the season, for whom he batted .333/.524/.767 with four home runs (2nd) and 10 RBIs in 30 at bats, and was named a "Rising Star". He was named a 2019 MiLB.com Organization All-Star.

The Giants again invited Bart to spring training in 2020. With the 2020 minor league season cancelled due to the COVID-19 pandemic, the Giants assigned Bart to their alternate training site.

==== Major leagues ====
On August 20, 2020, Bart was promoted to the major leagues for the first time. He made his debut that night against the Los Angeles Angels and got his first career hit, a double off of Julio Teherán. Bart recorded an extra-base hit in each of his first three career games, only the third Giants player to do so since at least 1901. He finished the season slashing a weak .233/.288/.320 in 33 games.

On May 4, 2021, Bart was called back up to the majors from one of the Giants alternate training sites. He had one at bat as a pinch hitter in the Giants' second game of the double header against the Colorado Rockies. Two days later, Bart was optioned to the Sacramento River Cats to start the Triple-A season. On July 10, due to the hand injury of Buster Posey, the Giants called Bart up again after he was hitting over .335 with an OPS of over .980. Bart hit seventh and caught Anthony DeSclafani while going 2–5 with two singles and an RBIs. The following day, Bart was optioned back down to Triple-A Sacramento during the All-Star break.

Bart began the 2022 season with San Francisco, and hit his first career home run off of Miami Marlins starter Sandy Alcántara on April 8. Bart struggled in his brief look and was optioned down to Triple-A Sacramento on June 8, after the Giants traded for Austin Wynns. Playing in a career–high 97 games, Bart again had difficulty keeping up with the bat, as he slashed .215/.296/.364, to go with 11 home runs and 25 RBIs.

Bart made the Opening Day roster for the Giants in 2023, but ceded starting duties to Roberto Pérez to begin the year. After Pérez underwent season-ending surgery on April 13, Bart assumed the starting role, with Blake Sabol serving as the backup. Bart hit .231 in 26 games before being placed on the injured list on May 19 with a groin strain. Upon being activated on June 10, Bart was optioned to Triple–A Sacramento in favor of Patrick Bailey, leaving Bailey and Sabol as the starting and backup catchers. In 30 games for San Francisco, Bart batted a very weak .207/.263/.264, with no home runs and only five RBIs.

The Giants signed Tom Murphy during the 2023–24 offseason. Bart made the Opening Day roster with Bailey and Murphy. On March 31, Bart was designated for assignment following the promotion of Daulton Jefferies.

=== Pittsburgh Pirates ===
On April 2, 2024, the Giants traded Bart to the Pittsburgh Pirates in exchange for Austin Strickland. He began competing with Henry Davis for playing time, as Jason Delay and Yasmani Grandal were injured. Across 80 games for the Pirates in 2024, Bart batted .265/.337/.462 with 13 home runs and 45 RBI.

In 2025, Bart won the starting catcher job out of spring training, but was injured on May 28 with a concussion. After Bart came back from his injury, he split time behind the plate with Davis, winding up with a .249/.355/.340 slash line. Bart hit four home runs and had 30 RBI.

Splitting playing time with Davis in the 2026 season, Bart batted .259 with two home runs and nine RBI. He was placed on the injured list on May 12, 2026, due to an infection in his left foot.

=== Atlanta Braves ===
On June 18, 2026, the Pirates traded Bart to the Atlanta Braves in exchange for Hunter Stratton. Bart made 20 appearances for the Braves, batting .188/.316/.375 with two home runs and seven RBI.

=== Chicago White Sox ===
On August 3, 2026, the Braves traded Bart to the Chicago White Sox in exchange for Duncan Davitt. On August 6, Bart suffered a fracture in his left hand following a hit-by-pitch from Boston Red Sox reliever Erik Miller. On November 17, Bart was designated for assignment by the White Sox.

=== Chicago Cubs ===
On November 20, 2026, Bart was claimed off waivers by the Chicago Cubs.
