= Eli Marrero =

Cuban baseball player (born 1973)

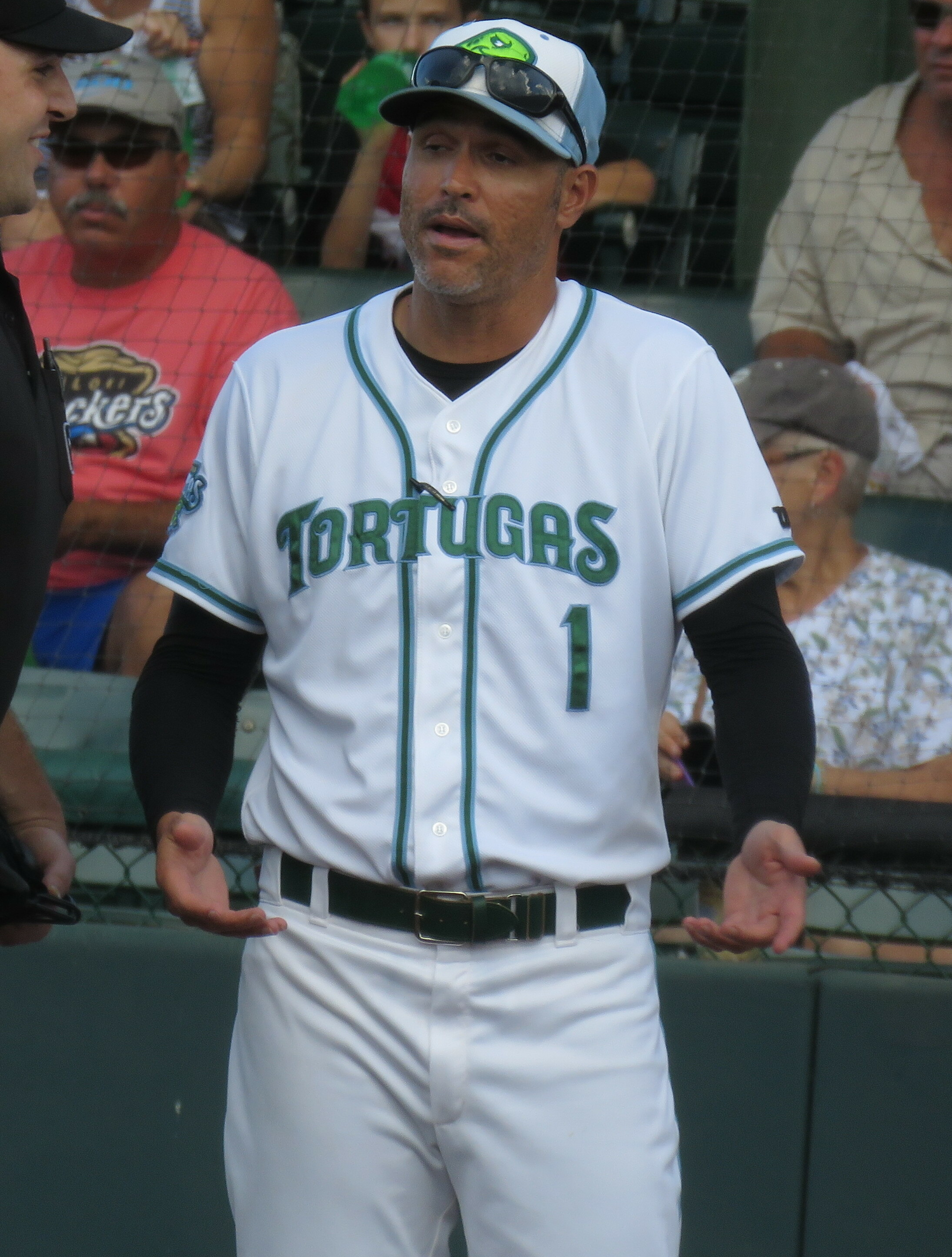
- Marrero with the Daytona Tortugas in 2016
- Utility player
- Born: November 17, 1973 (age 52); Havana, Cuba
- Batted: Right Threw: Right

MLB debut
- September 3, 1997, for the St. Louis Cardinals

Last MLB appearance
- August 8, 2006, for the New York Mets

MLB statistics
- Batting average: .243
- Home runs: 66
- Runs batted in: 261
- Stats at Baseball Reference

Former teams
- St. Louis Cardinals (1997–2003); Atlanta Braves (2004); Kansas City Royals (2005); Baltimore Orioles (2005); Colorado Rockies (2006); New York Mets (2006)

Elieser Marrero (born November 17, 1973), is a Cuban former Major League Baseball player. Marrero started his career as a catcher, but spent time at first base, third base and in the outfield.

== Playing career ==
=== St. Louis Cardinals ===
Marrero was selected in the third round of the 1993 Major League Baseball draft by the St. Louis Cardinals. He debuted with the Cardinals in September 1997.

Marrero was diagnosed with thyroid cancer during spring training in 1998. He had his thyroid removed on March 6, but returned the Cardinals on April 13. He missed two months in 2000 after tearing a ligament in his thumb. When he returned to the Cardinals in September, he started logging time in the outfield and at first base, while still catching occasionally. Marrero caught Bud Smith's no-hitter on September 3, 2001.

=== Atlanta Braves ===
The Cardinals traded Marrero and J.D. Drew to the Atlanta Braves in December 2003 for pitchers Jason Marquis, Ray King, and prospect Adam Wainwright. Marrero hit .415 against left-handed pitchers with Atlanta in 2004, serving as a backup outfielder behind lefties Drew and Charles Thomas.

=== Partial seasons with several MLB teams ===
Following the 2004 season, the Braves dealt him to the Kansas City Royals, who needed a power-hitting corner outfielder, for minor-league pitcher Jorge Vasquez. He saw action at all three outfield positions and first base, but hit only .159 in 32 games. The Royals designated him for assignment on May 31, 2005. On June 8, the Royals traded him and cash considerations to the Baltimore Orioles for minor-league infielder Peter Maestrales. He played in 22 games for the Orioles, batting a slightly better .220. He became a free agent after the season.

Marrero signed with the Colorado Rockies on January 7, 2006. He played in 30 games for the Rockies, batting .217 with 4 home runs. He played catcher for one inning in his first game with the Rockies, the first time playing the position since 2003. On June 9, while playing in Triple-A, the Rockies traded Marrero to the New York Mets for infielder Kaz Matsui and cash to offset Matsui's contract. On July 2, Marrero saw his first major league action at third base, playing two innings in a blowout loss to the New York Yankees. On August 9, the Mets released Marrero, after he hit .182 in 25 games.

On November 28, 2006, Marrero signed a minor league deal by the St. Louis Cardinals. On May 21, 2007, the Cardinals released Marrero, who played only one game with the Triple-A Memphis Redbirds.

== Coaching career ==
In July 2011, Marrero was named the batting coach of the Billings Mustangs. Marrero was the manager of the Arizona League Reds in 2013. On December 1, 2014, Marrero was named manager of the Cincinnati Reds Class A-Advanced affiliate, the Daytona Tortugas. Marrero was with the Tortugas until late in the 2017 season, when he was replaced by Ricky Gutiérrez.

== Personal life ==
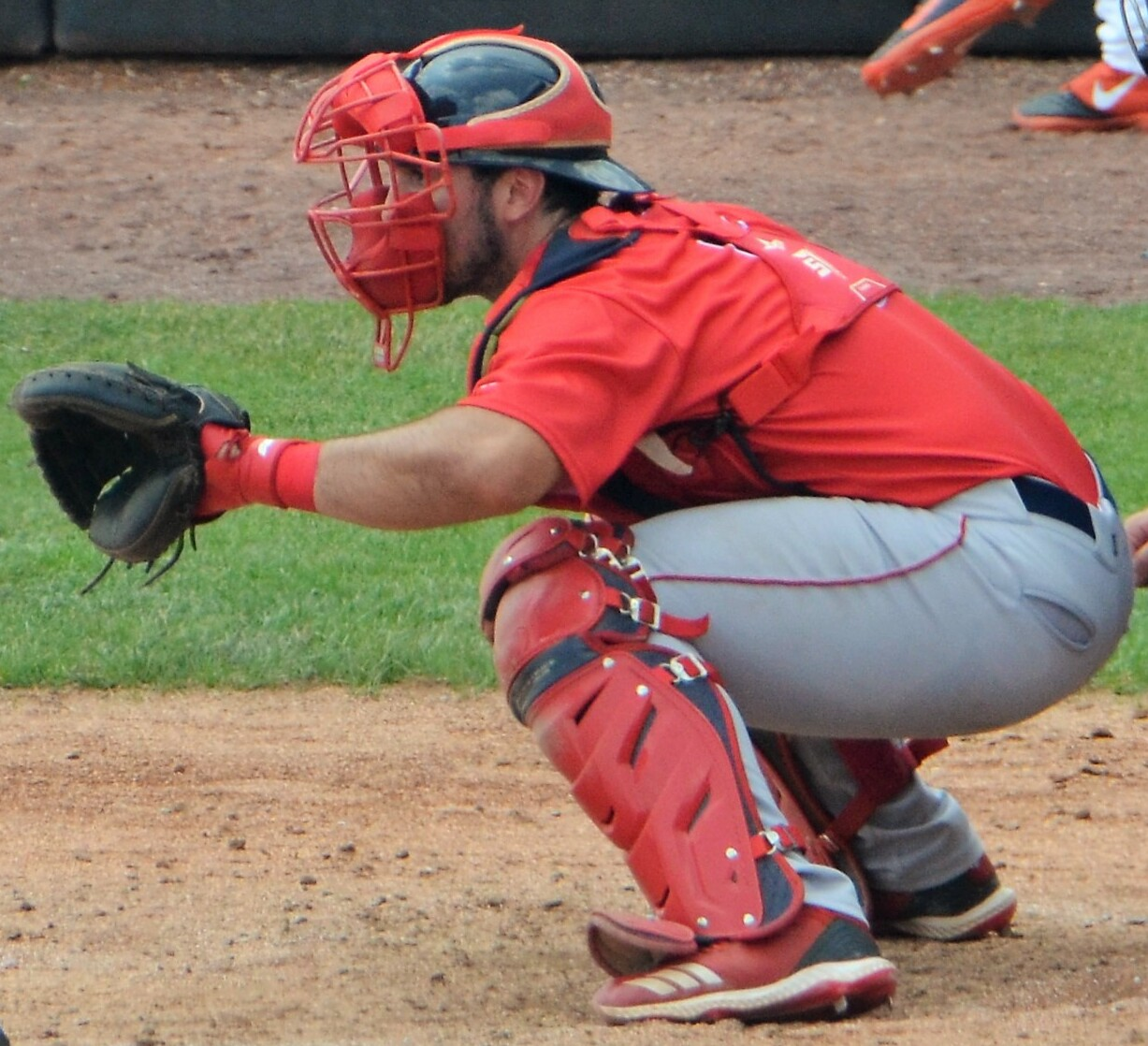
Elih Marrero catching for the Lowell Spinners in 2019

Marrero is the uncle of professional baseball players Chris Marrero, Christian Marrero, and Deven Marrero.

Marrero's son Elih was a 29th-round pick by the Cincinnati Reds in the 2015 MLB draft, but he elected to play college baseball at Mississippi State. Elih later transferred to St. Thomas University in Florida and was selected by the Boston Red Sox in the eighth round of the 2018 MLB draft.
