= Austin Wynns =

American baseball player (born 1990)

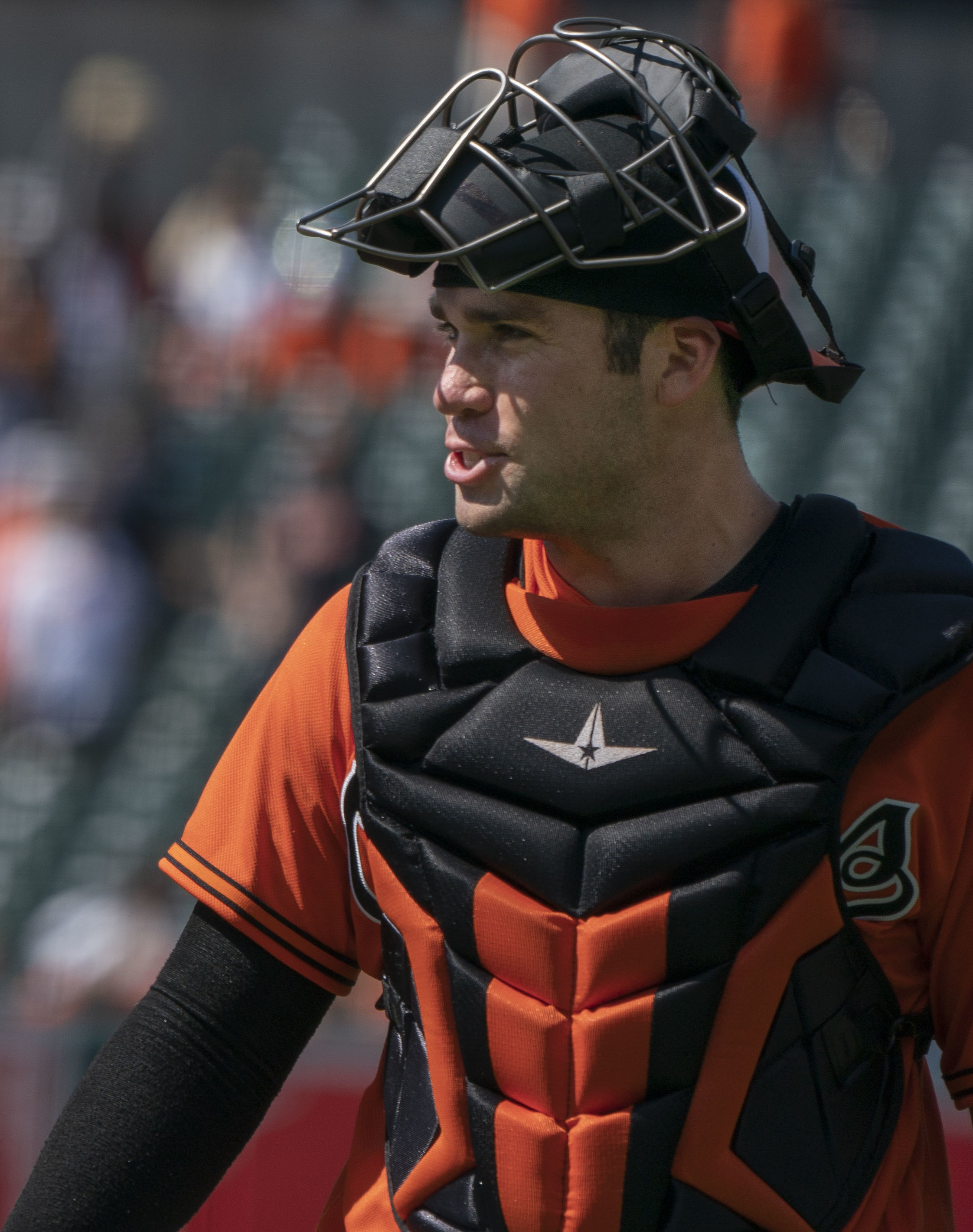
- Wynns with the Baltimore Orioles in 2018

Free agent
- Catcher
- Born: December 10, 1990 (age 35); San Diego, California, U.S.
- Bats: Right Throws: Right

MLB debut
- June 5, 2018, for the Baltimore Orioles

MLB statistics (through 2026 season)
- Batting average: .230
- Home runs: 20
- Runs batted in: 85
- Stats at Baseball Reference

Teams
- Baltimore Orioles (2018–2019, 2021); San Francisco Giants (2022–2023); Los Angeles Dodgers (2023); Colorado Rockies (2023); Cincinnati Reds (2024–2025); Athletics (2025–2026); Atlanta Braves (2026); Texas Rangers (2026)

Robert Austin Wynns (born December 10, 1990) is an American professional baseball catcher who is a free agent. He has previously played in Major League Baseball (MLB) for the Baltimore Orioles, San Francisco Giants, Los Angeles Dodgers, Colorado Rockies, Cincinnati Reds, Athletics, Atlanta Braves, and Texas Rangers. Wynns played college baseball at Fresno State University, and was drafted by the Orioles in the tenth round of the 2013 Major League Baseball draft.

== Amateur career ==
Wynns attended Poway High School in Poway, California. In 2009, as a senior, he hit .390 with five home runs and 37 RBIs. That season he was named first team All-California Interscholastic Federation, and Player of the Year in the Palomar League.

After graduating and going undrafted in the 2009 MLB draft, Wynns enrolled and played college baseball at Fresno State University. In 2012, he played collegiate summer baseball with the Bourne Braves of the Cape Cod Baseball League. As a senior in 2013, he batted .279/.362/.413 with three home runs and 24 RBIs in 53 games. He was drafted by the Baltimore Orioles in the tenth round of the 2013 Major League Baseball draft.

== Professional career ==
=== Baltimore Orioles ===
Wynns signed for $10,000, and spent 2013 with the Low-A Aberdeen IronBirds, posting a .235 batting average with 21 RBI in 54 games. On defense, he caught 37% of attempted base stealers. He was a 2013 NYP Mid-Season All-Star. In 2014, he played for both the Single-A Delmarva Shorebirds and the High-A Frederick Keys, batting a combined .251 with one home run and 37 RBI in 90 total games between the two teams.

In 2015, Wynns played for Frederick and the Double-A Bowie Baysox, batting .281/.349/.390 with three home runs and 31 RBI in 78 games. Wynns spent 2016 with Bowie, Frederick, and the Triple-A Norfolk Tides, hitting .287/.336/.416 with six home runs and 34 RBI in 80 games between the three affiliates. On defense, he caught 45.3% of attempted base stealers.

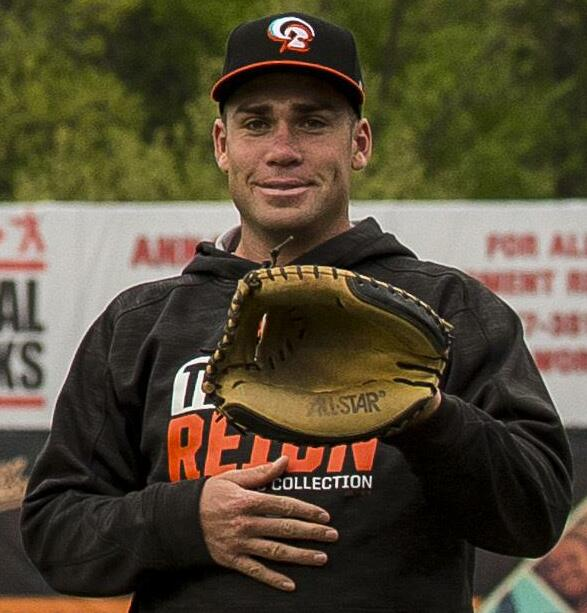
Wynns with the Bowie Baysox in 2017

After the 2016 season, Wynns played in the Arizona Fall League for the Peoria Javelinas. He played the 2017 season with Bowie, batting .281/.377/.419 with 10 home runs and 46 RBI in 105 games. On defense, he caught 38% of attempted base stealers. The Orioles added him to their 40-man roster after the 2017 season.

Wynns made his MLB debut on June 5, 2018. In 2018 with Baltimore he batted .255/.287/.382 in 118 plate appearances, while with Norfolk he batted .230/.288/.345 in 163 plate appearances. He spent the majority of the 2019 season at Norfolk and Bowie, where he batted .266/.355/.342 with three home runs and 29 RBI in 250 plate appearances, appearing in only 28 games with 74 plate appearances for the Orioles.

Wynns did not appear in any games for the Orioles during the 2020 season, spending the entirety at the Orioles’ alternate training site. On December 7, 2020, Wynns was removed from the 40-man roster and sent outright to Triple-A Norfolk.

On May 31, 2021, Wynns was selected to Baltimore's active roster. On June 12, Wynns hit his first career grand slam, off of Rich Hill of the Tampa Bay Rays. In 45 games and 139 plate appearances with Baltimore in 2021, Wynns batted .185/.232/.308 with four home runs and 14 RBI. In 59 plate appearances with the Triple–A Norfolk Tides, he hit .333/.448/.563 with three home runs and nine RBI. Following the season, he elected free agency on October 25, 2021.

=== Philadelphia Phillies ===
On October 26, 2021, Wynns signed with the Toros de Tijuana of the Mexican League. However, on March 19, 2022, he signed a minor league contract with the Philadelphia Phillies. He played 33 games for the Triple-A Lehigh Valley IronPigs and batted .365/.504/.500 with 3 home runs and 20 RBI in 134 plate appearances.

=== San Francisco Giants ===
The Phillies traded Wynns to the San Francisco Giants in exchange for Michael Plassmeyer on June 8, 2022. Wynns replaced rookie catcher Joey Bart, who was sent down to the Giants' Triple-A club. In 2022 with the Giants he batted .259/.313/.358 in 162 at–bats, with three home runs and 21 RBI while appearing in a career-high 65 games. He played 57 games at catcher, five at DH, and two as a relief pitcher.

On January 6, 2023, Wynns was designated for assignment by San Francisco after the signing of Michael Conforto was made official. On January 12, Wynns was sent outright to the Triple-A Sacramento River Cats. On April 8, Wynns was selected to the major league roster following an injury to catcher Roberto Pérez. He received two at-bats for San Francisco, striking out in both. On April 10, he was designated for assignment after Joey Bart was activated off of the injured list. On April 14, he cleared waivers and elected free agency.

=== Los Angeles Dodgers ===
On April 16, 2023, Wynns signed a major league contract with the Los Angeles Dodgers.He appeared in five games for the Dodgers, with two hits in 11 at-bats before he was designated for assignment on April 30.

=== Colorado Rockies ===
On May 4, 2023, Wynns was claimed off waivers by the Colorado Rockies. In 45 games for Colorado, he batted .214/.273/.282 with one home run and eight RBI. On October 13, Wynns was removed from the 40–man roster and sent outright to the Triple–A Albuquerque Isotopes. However, Wynns subsequently rejected the assignment and elected free agency.

=== Cincinnati Reds ===
On December 14, 2023, Wynns signed a one-year, major league contract with the Cincinnati Reds. However, he was designated for assignment on January 2, 2024. On January 4, Wynns cleared waivers and was sent outright to the Triple-A Louisville Bats, also receiving a non-roster invitation to spring training. On June 21, the Reds selected Wynns' contract, adding him to their active roster. He did not appear in a game for the Reds before he was designated for assignment on June 23. Wynns cleared waivers and was outrighted to Louisville on June 25. He had his contract selected once more on June 28, after Tyler Stephenson was placed on the paternity list. Wynns made one appearance for the Reds, going 3–for–5 with one RBI. He was designated for assignment after Stephenson was activated on July 2. Wynns cleared waivers and accepted an outright assignment to Louisville on July 4. However, the following day the Reds once more added him back to their major league roster. In a July 28 game against the Tampa Bay Rays, Wynns suffered a shoulder injury, later specified as a right teres major tear upon his placement on the injured list the following day. He was transferred to the 60–day injured list on August 23.On November 1, Wynns was removed from the 40–man roster and sent outright to Louisville, but rejected the assignment and elected free agency.

On January 13, 2025, Wynns re-signed with the Reds organization on a minor league contract. On March 26, the Reds selected Wynns' contract after he made the team's Opening Day roster. On April 20, Wynns became the fifth player in Cincinnati Reds history to record six hits in a game, collecting five singles and a three-run home run in a 24–2 win over the Baltimore Orioles. In 18 appearances for Cincinnati, he batted .400/.442/.700 with three home runs and 11 RBI. Despite the production, Wynns was designated for assignment by the Reds on June 6.

=== Athletics ===
On June 8, 2025, Wynns was traded to the Athletics in exchange for cash considerations. In 22 appearances for the Athletics, he batted .222/.242/.444 with three home runs and 10 RBI. On August 5, Wynns was placed on the injured list due to an abdominal strain. He was transferred to the 60-day injured list on August 11, officially ending his season.

Wynns made 14 appearances for the Athletics in 2026, going 3-for-39 (.077) with three walks. On May 7, 2026, Wynns was designated for assignment following Shea Langeliers' return from the paternity list.He was released by the Athletics after clearing waivers on May 12.

=== Los Angeles Angels ===
On May 15, 2026, Wynns signed a minor league contract with the Los Angeles Angels organization. Wynns made eight appearances for the Triple-A Salt Lake Bees, going 10-for-30 (.333) with two home runs and seven RBI.

=== Atlanta Braves ===
On June 4, 2026, Wynns was traded to the Atlanta Braves in exchange for cash considerations; he was subsequently added to Atlanta's active roster. In six appearances for Atlanta, he went 1-for-14 (.071). On June 15, Wynns was removed from the 40-man roster and sent outright to the Triple-A Gwinnett Stripers. However, he subsequently rejected the assignment and elected free agency the following day.

=== Texas Rangers ===
On June 23, 2026, Wynns signed a minor league contract with the Texas Rangers. He made 12 appearances for the Triple-A Round Rock Express, batting .289/.413/.474 with two home runs, nine RBI, and two stolen bases. On July 21, the Rangers selected Wynns' contract, adding him to their active roster. In 14 appearances for the Rangers, Wynns batted .276/.323/.379 with one home run and one RBI. On August 18, Wynns was designated for assignment following Danny Jansen's return from the injured list. He cleared waivers and elected free agency on August 20.

=== Chicago Cubs ===
On August 25, 2026, Wynns signed a minor league contract with the Chicago Cubs. In 12 games with Triple-A Iowa Cubs he batted .143/.295/.257 with one home run, two RBIs and one stolen base. He elected free agency on November 2.
