= Chris Marrero =

American baseball player (born 1988)

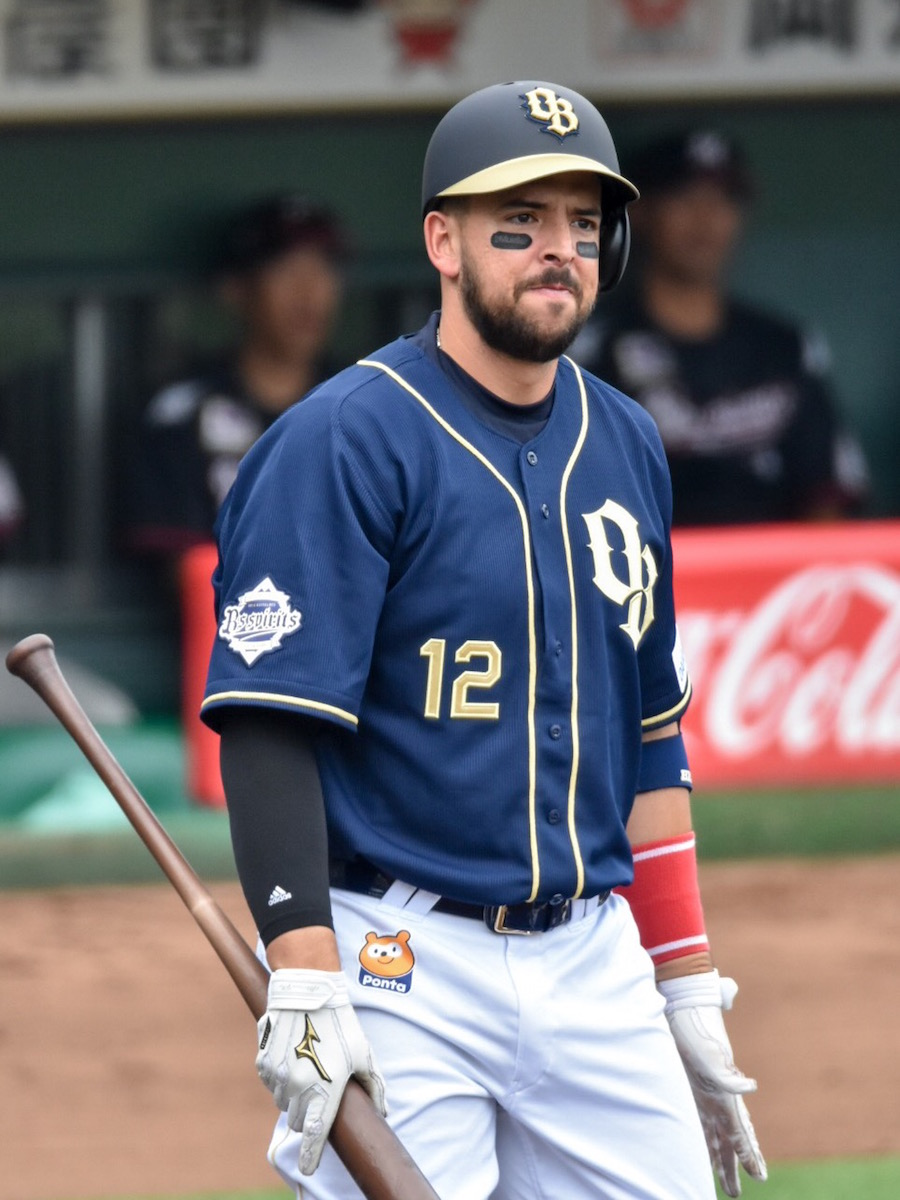
- Marrero with the Orix Buffaloes
- Outfielder / First baseman
- Born: July 2, 1988 (age 37); Miami, Florida, U.S.
- Batted: Right Threw: Right

Professional debut
- MLB: August 27, 2011, for the Washington Nationals
- NPB: June 9, 2017, for the Orix Buffaloes

Last appearance
- MLB: April 23, 2017, for the San Francisco Giants
- NPB: September 29, 2019, for the Orix Buffaloes

MLB statistics
- Batting average: .232
- Home runs: 1
- Runs batted in: 16

NPB statistics
- Batting average: .243
- Home runs: 33
- Runs batted in: 90
- Stats at Baseball Reference

Teams
- Washington Nationals (2011, 2013); San Francisco Giants (2017); Orix Buffaloes (2017–2019)

Christopher Marrero (born July 2, 1988) is a Cuban-American former professional baseball outfielder and first baseman. He played for the Washington Nationals and the San Francisco Giants in Major League Baseball (MLB) and for the Orix Buffaloes of Nippon Professional Baseball (NPB).

== Professional career ==
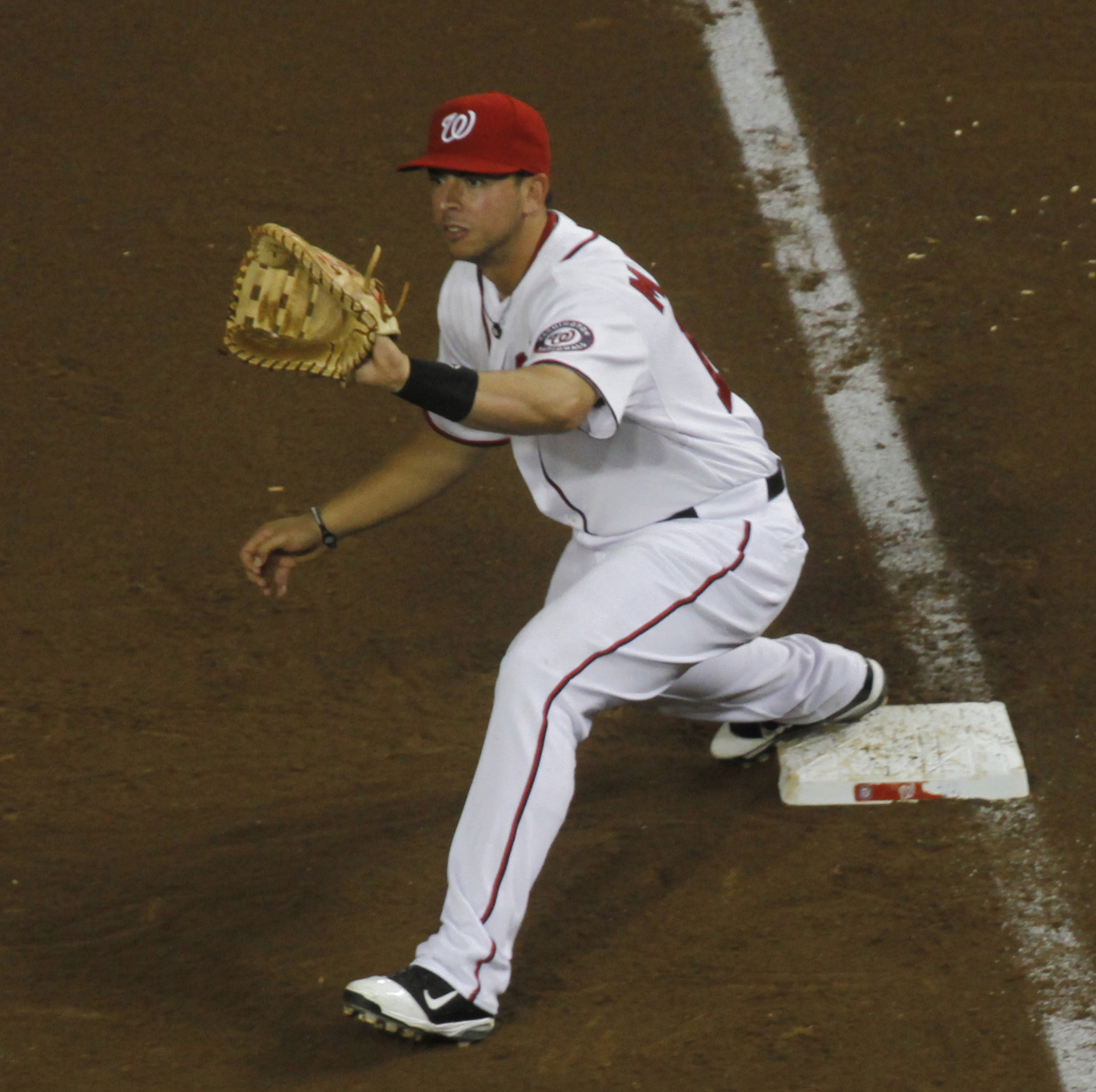
Marrero with the Washington Nationals

=== Washington Nationals ===
A 2006 graduate of Monsignor Edward Pace High School in Miami, Florida, Marrero was selected by the Washington Nationals with the 15th overall pick in the 2006 amateur draft and signed for a bonus of $1.625 million. Marrero and former teammate Gio González briefly played together during their high school years at Pace when González transferred there in 2004.

Marrero spent the 2006 season with the GCL Nationals, Washington's affiliate in the rookie-level Gulf Coast League. In 2007, he played with the Hagerstown Suns and was promoted midway through the season to the Potomac Nationals], the high A team of the Nationals . He began the 2008 season with the extended spring training team from the Washington Nationals and eventually ended up playing for the Potomac Nationals again. His second minor league season was cut short when he suffered a broken right fibula on 18 June 2008.

Marrero was called up to the majors for the first time on August 27, 2011. He was outrighted off the Nationals roster on October 24, 2013.

=== Baltimore Orioles ===
Marrero signed a minor league deal with the Baltimore Orioles on December 10, 2013.

=== Chicago White Sox ===
Marrero signed a minor league deal with the Chicago White Sox on June 5, 2015, after starting the 2015 season with the Somerset Patriots. He was released by the White Sox on August 6, 2015.

=== Boston Red Sox ===
On August 14, 2015, the Boston Red Sox signed Marrero to a minor league contract. He started 2016 with the Triple-A Pawtucket Red Sox, where he won the International League Home Run Derby, and also earned MVP honors in the league's 4–2 victory over the Pacific Coast League at the Triple-A All-Star Game. He played the 2015 and 2016 seasons with his cousin, infielder Deven Marrero. He elected free agency following the season on November 7, 2016.

=== San Francisco Giants ===
On November 10, 2016, Marrero signed a minor league contract with the San Francisco Giants. After a strong spring training, he was named to the Giants' 25-man opening day roster for 2017. On April 14, 2017, he hit his first major league home run off Tyler Anderson of the Colorado Rockies. He was designated for assignment on April 24.

=== Orix Buffaloes ===
On May 24, 2017, Marrero signed with the Orix Buffaloes of Nippon Professional Baseball. Marrero resigned with the Orix Buffaloes for the 2018 season.

On December 2, 2019, he became a free agent.

== Personal life ==
Marrero is the nephew of former major-leaguer Eli Marrero. He has three other family members in professional baseball: his brother Christian Marrero, his cousin Deven Marrero, and his cousin Elih Marrero, Eli's son.
