= Hunter Stratton =

American baseball player (born 1996)

San Diego Padres – No. 63
- Pitcher
- Born: November 17, 1996 (age 29); Bristol, Tennessee, U.S.
- Bats: Right Throws: Right

MLB debut
- September 5, 2023, for the Pittsburgh Pirates

MLB statistics (through 2026 season)
- Win–loss record: 3–2
- Earned run average: 3.88
- Strikeouts: 62
- Stats at Baseball Reference

Teams
- Pittsburgh Pirates (2023–2025); Atlanta Braves (2025–2026); Pittsburgh Pirates (2026)

Hunter Alexander Stratton (born November 17, 1996) is an American professional baseball pitcher for the San Diego Padres of Major League Baseball (MLB). He has previously played in MLB for the Pittsburgh Pirates and Atlanta Braves. He made his MLB debut in 2023.

== Amateur career ==
Stratton attended Sullivan East High School in Bluff City, Tennessee, where he finished his high school career with 168 strikeouts and was inducted into their Hall of Fame. He played two seasons of college baseball at Walters State Community College, throwing two no-hitters during his sophomore year. Following the end of his sophomore year, he was selected by the Pittsburgh Pirates in the 16th round of the 2017 Major League Baseball draft.

== Professional career ==
=== Pittsburgh Pirates ===
Stratton signed with the Pirates and made his professional debut with the Bristol Pirates of the Rookie-level Appalachian League, going 0–2 with a 4.81 ERA and 38 strikeouts over 43 innings. He spent the 2018 season with the West Virginia Power of the Single–A South Atlantic League with whom he appeared in 22 games (making twenty starts) and went 6–5 with a 4.16 ERA and 82 strikeouts over 101 2/3 innings. In 2019, he pitched for the Bradenton Marauders of the High–A Florida State League where he pitched 72 innings and compiled a 5–4 record and 4.25 ERA. Stratton did not play a minor league game in 2020 due the cancellation of the minor league season because of the COVID-19 pandemic. Stratton began the 2021 season with the Altoona Curve of the Double-A Northeast and was promoted to the Indianapolis Indians of the Triple-A East during the season. Over 38 relief appearances between the two teams, he went 2–2 with a 2.39 ERA and seventy strikeouts over 49 innings. After the season, he played in the Dominican Winter League for the Gigantes del Cibao. He returned to the Indians for the 2022 season. Over 46 relief appearances, he posted a 2–6 record with a 5.71 ERA and 82 strikeouts over 63 innings.

Stratton returned to Triple–A Indianapolis in 2023. In 47 appearances, he registered a 4–4 record and 3.99 ERA with 74 strikeouts and 6 saves in 56 1/3 innings pitched. On September 4, 2023, Stratton was selected to the 40-man roster and promoted to the major leagues for the first time. In 8 games for the Pirates during his debut campaign, he posted a respectable 2.25 ERA with 10 strikeouts across 12.0 innings of work. On November 17, Stratton was non-tendered and became a free agent.

On December 8, 2023, Stratton re–signed with the Pirates organization on a minor league contract. On March 25, 2024, the Pirates announced that Stratton's contract would be selected after he made the Opening Day roster. In 36 appearances out of the bullpen, he compiled a 3.58 ERA with 33 strikeouts across 37 2/3 innings pitched. On August 24, Stratton suffered a ruptured patellar tendon while attempting to cover home plate on a wild pitch that got past Joey Bart. He was subsequently ruled out for the remainder of the season and was placed on the 60–day injured list the following day. On November 22, the Pirates non–tendered Stratton, making him a free agent.

On December 2, 2024, Stratton re–signed with the Pirates on a minor league contract. On March 22, 2025, the Pirates selected Stratton's contract and subsequently optioned him to Triple-A Indianapolis. In three appearances for Pittsburgh, he struggled to a 23.63 ERA with one strikeout across 2 2/3 innings pitched. Stratton was designated for assignment by the Pirates on June 26.

=== Atlanta Braves ===
On July 1, 2025, Stratton was traded to the Atlanta Braves in exchange for Titus Dumitru and cash considerations; he was subsequently optioned to the Triple-A Gwinnett Stripers. Stratton made 12 appearances down the stretch for Atlanta, registering a 1-1 record and 2.20 ERA with 15 strikeouts and one save across 16 1/3 innings pitched.

Stratton was optioned to Triple-A Gwinnett to begin the 2026 season. He made one appearance for Atlanta, pitching a scoreless relief outing against the Colorado Rockies. On June 17, 2026, Stratton was designated for assignment by the Braves.

=== Pittsburgh Pirates (second stint) ===
On June 18, 2026, Stratton was traded to the Pittsburgh Pirates in exchange for Joey Bart.

=== San Diego Padres ===
On August 3, 2026, Stratton was traded to the San Diego Padres in exchange for Andrew Moore.

== Personal life ==
Stratton married his wife, Lakyn, in November 2019. Their first child was born in March 2024.
