= Luis Ortiz (pitcher, born 1999) =

Dominican baseball player (born 1999)

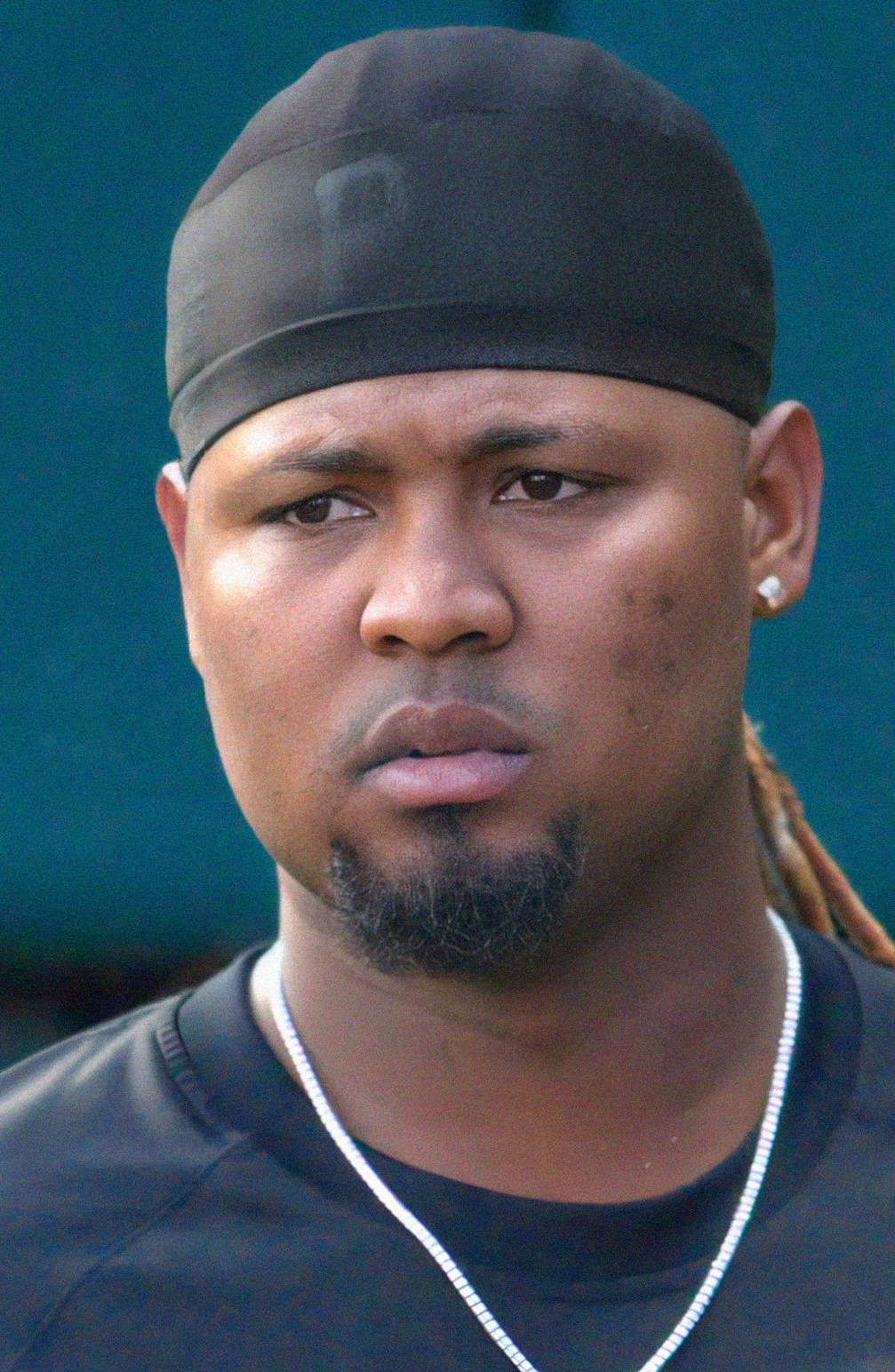
- Ortiz with the Pittsburgh Pirates in 2024

Cleveland Guardians – No. 45
- Pitcher
- Born: January 27, 1999 (age 27); San Pedro de Macorís, Dominican Republic
- Bats: Right Throws: Right

MLB debut
- September 13, 2022, for the Pittsburgh Pirates

MLB statistics (through 2025 season)
- Win–loss record: 16–22
- Earned run average: 4.05
- Strikeouts: 279
- Stats at Baseball Reference

Teams
- Pittsburgh Pirates (2022–2024); Cleveland Guardians (2025)

Luis Leandro Ortiz (born January 27, 1999) is a Dominican professional baseball pitcher for the Cleveland Guardians of Major League Baseball (MLB). He has previously played in MLB for the Pittsburgh Pirates. In July 2025, Ortiz, along with teammate Emmanuel Clase, was placed on non-paid leave by the MLB as part of an investigation into a scheme to rig bets on pitches thrown in games. In November, he was federally indicted and arrested in relation to the investigation.

== Career ==
=== Pittsburgh Pirates ===
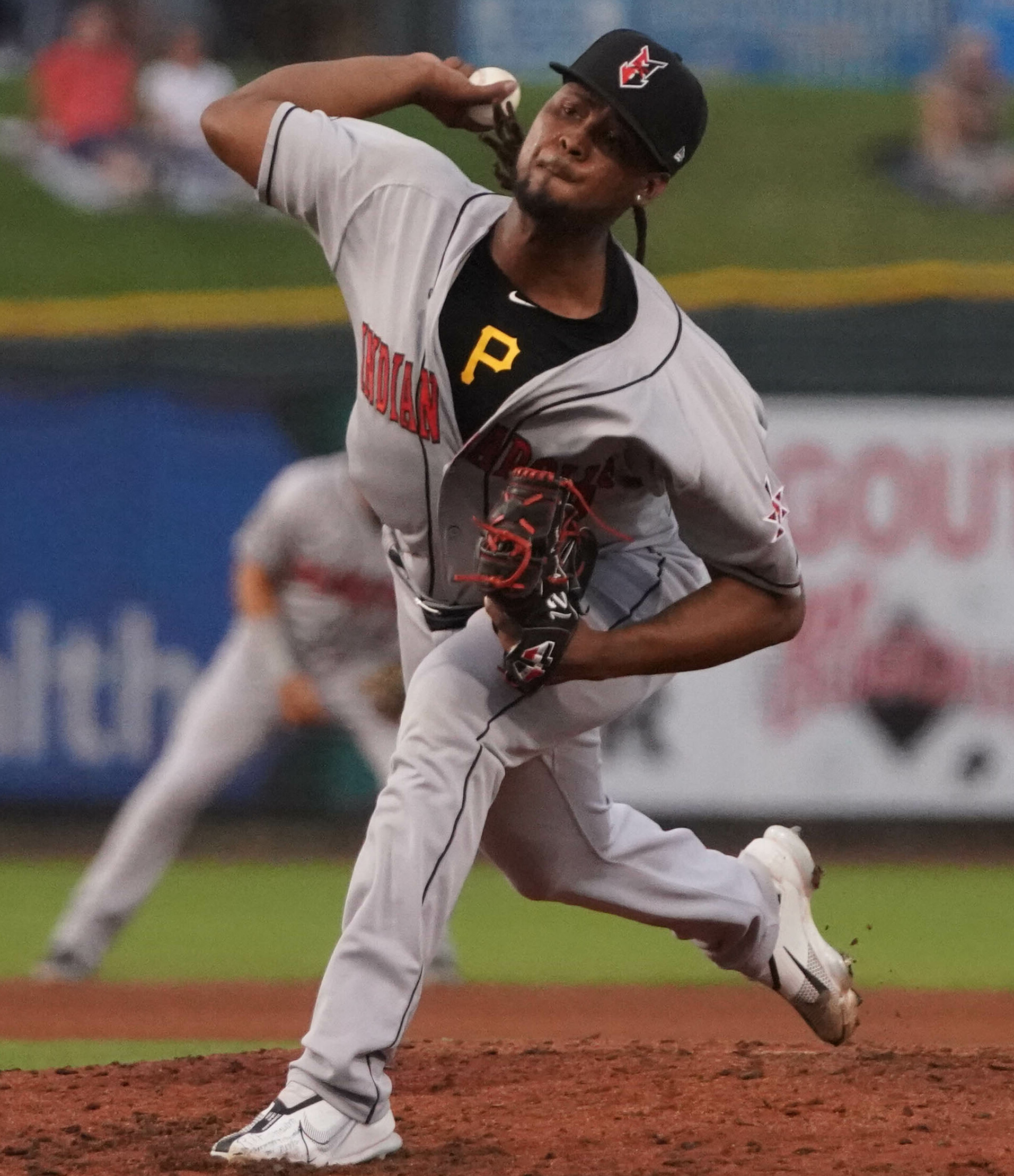
Ortiz with the Indianapolis Indians in 2022

Ortiz was signed by the Pittsburgh Pirates as an international free agent out of the Dominican Republic on October 2, 2018, for a $25,000 signing bonus. He made his professional debut 2019 for the rookie–level Bristol Pirates, logging a 4.09 earned run average (ERA) across 11 starts.

Ortiz did not play in a game in 2020 because the minor league season was canceled by the COVID-19 pandemic. Ortiz spent the 2021 season with the Single–A Bradenton Marauders, making 22 appearances (19 starts) and recording a 3.09 ERA with 113 strikeouts in 87 1/3 innings of work. By late 2021, his fastball had reached as high as 99 miles per hour (159 km/h).

On July 15 and August 9, 2022, while pitching for the Double–A Altoona Curve, Ortiz threw two immaculate innings in a span of just 25 days, four fewer than the shortest known span between such innings by a Major League pitcher. Ortiz made 26 total appearances (25 starts) split between Altoona and the Triple–A Indianapolis Indians in 2022. In a career–high 124 1/3 innings pitched, he accumulated a 5–9 record and 4.56 ERA with 138 strikeouts.

Ortiz was promoted to the majors for the first time on September 11, 2022. Pirates general manager Ben Cherington told the press that the club intended to use the remainder of the season to assess the quality of starting pitching in their organization. Ortiz made 4 starts during his rookie campaign, posting an 0–2 record and 4.50 ERA with 17 strikeouts over 16 innings of work.

Ortiz was optioned to the Triple-A Indianapolis Indians to begin the 2023 season. He was recalled to the Pirates on May 9. In 18 games (15 starts) for Pittsburgh, Ortiz compiled a 5–5 record and 4.78 ERA with 59 strikeouts across 86 2/3 innings pitched.

Ortiz made 37 appearances (15 starts) for the Pirates in 2024, accumulating a 7–6 record and 3.32 ERA with 107 strikeouts and 1 saves across 135 2/3 innings pitched.

=== Cleveland Guardians ===
On December 10, 2024, the Pirates traded Ortiz, Michael Kennedy, and Josh Hartle to the Cleveland Guardians for Spencer Horwitz.

== Gambling allegations, indictment and arrest ==
On July 3, 2025, Ortiz was placed on the non-disciplinary paid leave by MLB amid an ongoing investigation into gambling-related activities. On November 9, federal prosecutors from the United States District Court for the Eastern District of New York indicted Ortiz and his teammate Emmanuel Clase on charges including wire fraud conspiracy, conspiracy to influence sporting contests by bribery, and money laundering conspiracy. The same day, Ortiz was arrested at Boston's Logan International Airport. On November 10, U.S. Magistrate Judge Donald Cabell in Boston granted Ortiz his release from prison after Ortiz agreed to pay a $500,000 bond, with $50,000 of it secured, surrender his passport, and restrict his travel to the Northeast. Two days later, he pled not guilty to the charges. The same day, U.S. Magistrate Judge Joseph Marutollo also granted Ortiz a release on a $500,000 bond, but also restricted his travel to not only New York and Boston, but also the state of Ohio.

== See also ==
- List of Major League Baseball players from the Dominican Republic
