= Jason Delay =

American baseball player (born 1995)

Free agent
- Catcher
- Born: March 7, 1995 (age 31); Plano, Texas, U.S.
- Bats: Right Throws: Right

MLB debut
- June 14, 2022, for the Pittsburgh Pirates

MLB statistics (through 2024 season)
- Batting average: .231
- Home runs: 2
- Runs batted in: 35
- Stats at Baseball Reference

Teams
- Pittsburgh Pirates (2022–2024)

Jason Thomas Delay (born March 7, 1995) is an American professional baseball catcher who is a free agent. He has previously played in Major League Baseball (MLB) for the Pittsburgh Pirates. He made his MLB debut in 2022.

== Amateur career ==
Delay attended Northview High School in Johns Creek, Georgia, and Vanderbilt University, where he played college baseball for the Vanderbilt Commodores. He was a member of the 2014 College World Series champions, and played in the 2015 College World Series, which Vanderbilt lost. In 2015, he played collegiate summer baseball with the Bourne Braves of the Cape Cod Baseball League, and returned to the league in 2016 with the Cotuit Kettleers.

== Professional career ==
=== Pittsburgh Pirates ===
The Pittsburgh Pirates selected Delay in the fourth round, with the 118th overall selection, of the 2017 MLB draft. He signed with the Pirates for a $100,000 signing bonus. Delay spent his first professional season with the rookie–level Bristol Pirates and Low–A West Virginia Black Bears, hitting .228 in 34 combined appearances.

Delay spent the 2018 season with the High–A Bradenton Marauders, hitting .247/.325/.302 with two home runs and 21 RBI across 67 games. In 2019, he played in 67 games for the Double–A Altoona Curve, slashing .234/.286/.398 with career–highs in home runs (8) and RBI (37). Delay did not play in a game in 2020 due to the cancellation of the minor league season because of the COVID-19 pandemic.

He returned to action in 2021 with Altoona and the Triple–A Indianapolis Indians. In 30 games between the two affiliates, Delay batted .170/.204/.277 with two home runs and seven RBI. He began the 2022 season with the Indianapolis Indians. In June 2022, Delay had decided he would retire from professional baseball during Indianapolis's upcoming trip to play the Gwinnett Stripers, near his hometown in Johns Creek, Georgia.

On June 13, 2022, Delay was selected to the 40-man roster and promoted to the major leagues for the first time. He made his major league debut on June 14 in the first game of a double header against the St. Louis Cardinals. After going 0-for-2 with a walk in his debut, the Pirates optioned him back to Triple-A Indianapolis Indians. On July 7, Delay recorded his first career hit, an RBI double off of Cincinnati Reds starter Mike Minor. On July 22, Delay hit his first career home run, a solo shot off of Miami Marlins starter Braxton Garrett. Delay made 57 appearances for the Pirates in his rookie campaign, hitting .213/.265/.271 with one home run and 11 RBI. He was outrighted off the roster on November 10.

On March 28, 2023, the Pirates announced that Delay had made the Opening Day roster as the backup catcher behind Austin Hedges. He had his contract selected on March 30. In 70 games for Pittsburgh, Delay batted .251/.319/.347 with one home run and 18 RBI.

Delay began the 2024 season with Pittsburgh, but played in only one game before suffering a knee injury. On April 19, 2024, it was announced that he would undergo surgery to repair a torn meniscus in his right knee. He was activated from the injured list and optioned to Triple–A Indianapolis on June 3. On June 14, Pirates catcher Henry Davis was removed from the game after the 6th inning. Davis was placed on the 7-day injured list with a concussion. Delay was recalled from Triple-A Indianapolis on June 15. He played his first game back the next day on June 16, and went 1-for-3 with a double and three RBI. In 7 games for Pittsburgh, Delay went 3-for-15 (.200) with 6 RBI and 3 walks.

Delay was optioned to Triple-A Indianapolis to begin the 2025 season. On April 1, 2025, Delay was designated for assignment following the promotion of Thomas Harrington.

=== Atlanta Braves ===
On April 3, 2025, Delay was traded to the Atlanta Braves in exchange for cash considerations. He was subsequently optioned to the Double-A Columbus Clingstones. On July 31, Delay was removed from the 40-man roster and sent outright to the Triple-A Gwinnett Stripers. In 68 appearances split between the two affiliates, he batted .200/.261/.257 with one home run, 14 RBI, and one stolen base. Delay elected free agency on October 3.

=== Boston Red Sox ===
On October 26, 2025, Delay signed a minor league contract with the Boston Red Sox. In 70 games with Triple-A Worcester Red Sox he batted .228/.330/.359 with 3 home runs, 35 RBIs and one stolen base. He elected free agency on November 2.

== Personal life ==
Delay is the son of Tim and Vicky. He has two older sisters, Julia and Kelly.
