= Mitch Keller =

American baseball player (born 1996)

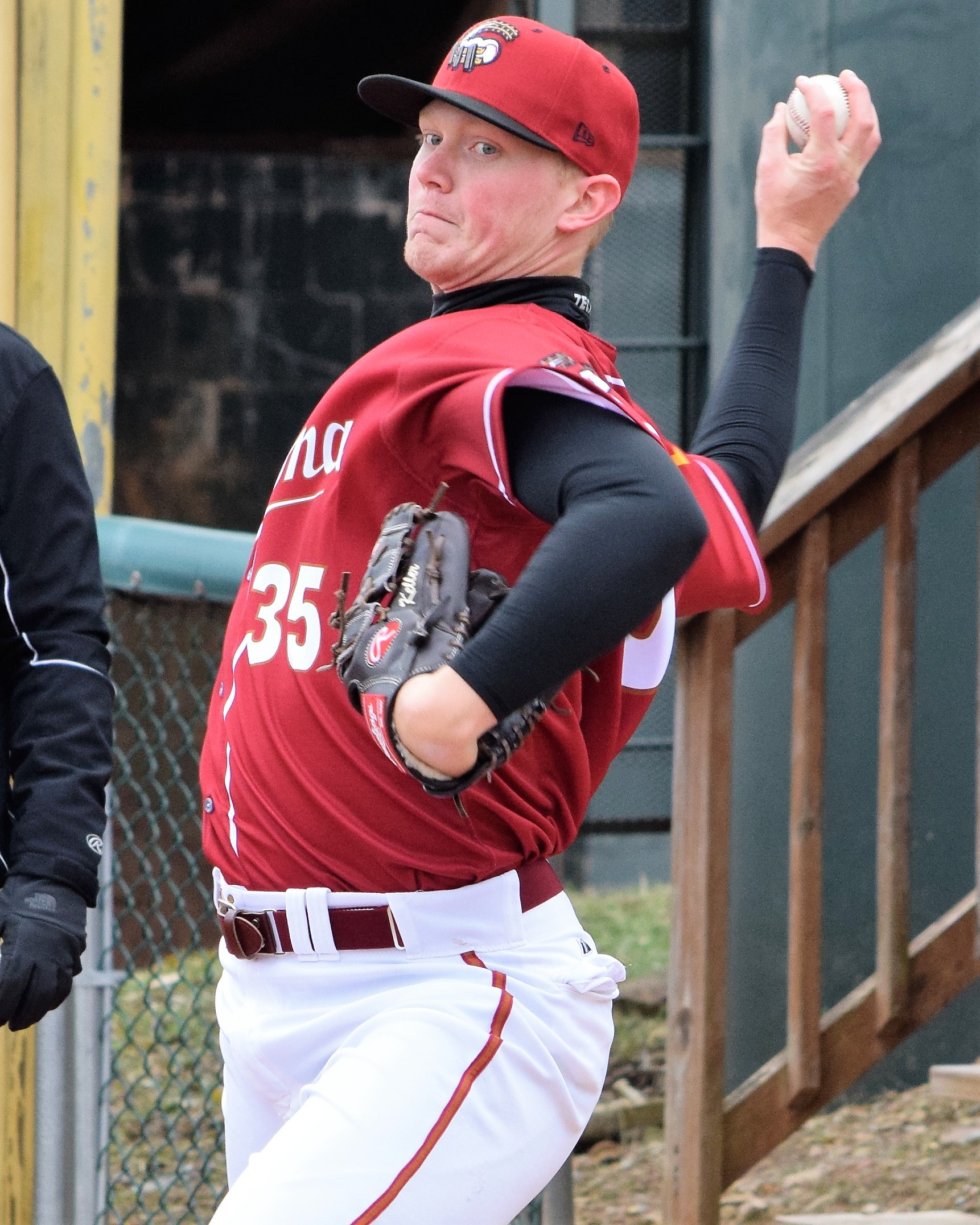
- Keller with the Altoona Curve in 2018

Pittsburgh Pirates – No. 23
- Pitcher
- Born: April 4, 1996 (age 30); Cedar Rapids, Iowa, U.S.
- Bats: Right Throws: Right

MLB debut
- May 27, 2019, for the Pittsburgh Pirates

MLB statistics (through August 2, 2026)
- Win–loss record: 48–73
- Earned run average: 4.60
- Strikeouts: 926
- Stats at Baseball Reference

Teams
- Pittsburgh Pirates (2019–present)

Career highlights and awards
- All-Star (2023)

Mitch Thomas Keller (born April 4, 1996) is an American professional baseball pitcher for the Pittsburgh Pirates of Major League Baseball (MLB). He made his MLB debut in 2019 and was an All-Star in 2023.

== Amateur career ==
Keller was drafted by the Pittsburgh Pirates in the second round of the 2014 Major League Baseball draft out of Xavier High School in Cedar Rapids, Iowa. He signed with the Pirates on June 14, 2014, for a signing bonus worth $1,000,000. He had been committed to play college baseball for the North Carolina Tar Heels.

== Professional career ==
=== Minor Leagues (2014–2019) ===
Keller made his professional debut with the Gulf Coast League Pirates, where he spent all of 2014, pitching to a 1.98 ERA in 27 1/3 innings. Keller spent 2015 with the Low–A Bristol Pirates, posting a 0–3 record with a 5.49 ERA in six starts. He spent 2016 with the Low-A West Virginia Power where he posted an 8–5 record with a 2.46 ERA in 23 starts. He also pitched in one game for the High-A Bradenton Marauders at the end of the season.

In 2017, Keller began the season with Bradenton. After going 6–3 with a 3.14 ERA in 15 starts, he was promoted to the Double–A Altoona Curve in August and finished the season there with a 2–2 record and 3.12 ERA in six starts. Entering the 2018 season, MLB.com ranked Keller as Pittsburgh's top prospect. He began the season with Altoona, posting a 9–2 record with a 2.72 ERA in 14 starts before a June 28 promotion to the Triple–A Indianapolis Indians. With Indianapolis, he regressed to a 3–2 record with a 4.82 ERA in 10 starts. Keller was the starting pitcher for the United States in the All-Star Futures Game on July 15, pitching a scoreless first inning with one strikeout. The Pirates added him to their 40-man roster after the season.

Keller returned to Indianapolis to start the 2019 season. In nine games prior to his MLB debut, Keller went 5–0 with a 3.45 ERA. Keller was named the 2019 International League Pitcher of the Year after posting a 3.56 ERA over the entire Triple–A season.

=== Major leagues (2019–present) ===
Keller was promoted to the major leagues on May 27, 2019, and he made his major league debut in the second game of a doubleheader at Great American Ball Park versus the Cincinnati Reds. In his debut, Keller gave up six earned runs over four innings, walking two and striking out seven. He was optioned to Indianapolis following the game. Keller returned to the big league club for two starts in June, and permanently joined the Pirates rotation in August. He would finish the season with a 7.13 ERA over 12 starts and 48 innings pitched.

Keller made his first Opening Day roster to begin the shortened 2020 season. Over the course of the season, he registered a 2.91 ERA with 16 strikeouts. However, a stint on the injured list with left side discomfort limited Keller to 21 1/3 innings of work over five starts. Keller had a historically lucky season, as his opponents finished with a .104 batting average on balls in play (BABIP), the lowest single season number for any pitcher with at least 20 innings.

In 2021, Keller got off to a rough start, posting a 7.04 ERA over his first 12 starts. His poor performance led to a demotion to Triple–A Indianapolis on June 12. In Indianapolis, Keller rebounded to the tune of a tune of a 3.21 ERA in eight appearances. He returned to Pittsburgh on July 30, rejoining the Pirates rotation. Keller finished the season 5–11 with a 6.17 ERA and 92 strikeouts in 100 2/3 innings. It would stand as the third worst ERA among pitchers with a minimum of 100 innings pitched that season.

In his first seven appearances of the 2022 season, Keller had 6.61 ERA in 32 2/3 innings of work. However, after adding a sinker to his mix, Keller would go on to throw for 3.21 ERA and 3.67 FIP across his remaining 126 1/3 innings. Keller gave up the 703rd and final home run to Albert Pujols on October 4, 2022. In total, Keller pitched to an ERA of 3.91, striking out 138 batters, to go along with a Wins Above Replacement value of 2.1 over 159 innings during the 2022 season.

On January 13, 2023, Keller agreed to a one-year, $2.4375 million contract with the Pirates, avoiding salary arbitration. On March 15, 2023, he was named Pittsburgh's Opening Day starter for the upcoming season. On May 9 against the Colorado Rockies, Keller earned the win by tossing his first MLB complete-game shutout, holding Colorado to four hits while striking out eight and allowing one walk. It ended a seven-game losing streak and became the first complete-game shutout thrown by a Pirate since 2018. In his next start, Keller notched seven shutout innings and 13 strikeouts against the Baltimore Orioles. He was named the National League Player of the Week for his performances.

On July 2, 2023, Keller was named to his first MLB All-Star Game. Keller pitched the second inning of the game, giving up one earned run on a solo home run by Tampa Bay Rays infielder Yandy Diaz. Keller finished the season with a 13–9 record and 4.21 ERA to go along with a career-high 210 strikeouts.

On February 22, 2024, Keller signed a five-year, $77 million contract extension with the Pirates. The same day, the Pirates announced that Keller would once again be the team's Opening Day starter. He made 31 total starts for Pittsburgh, compiling an 11–12 record and 4.25 ERA with 166 strikeouts over 178 innings of work.

Keller made 32 starts for the Pirates during the 2025 season, accumulating a 6–15 record and 4.19 ERA with 150 strikeouts across 176 1/3 innings pitched.

Keller made 22 starts for Pittsburgh in 2026, compiling a 6–8 record and 5.29 ERA with 89 strikeouts across 115 2/3 innings pitched. On August 3, 2026, Keller was placed on the 60–day injured list due to a teres major muscle injury in his right arm, officially ending his season.

== Personal ==
Keller and his wife Clancy married in 2020. His brother, Jon Keller, played in the Baltimore Orioles organization.
