= Ale Pipo =

Spanish footballer

Personal information
- Full name: Alejandro Rodríguez Marrero
- Date of birth: 19 August 1994 (age 32)
- Place of birth: Las Palmas, Spain
- Height: 1.77 m (5 ft 9 1/2 in)
- Position: Attacking midfielder

Team information
- Current team: Villa Santa Brígida

Youth career
- Las Palmas
- Barcelona
- Las Palmas

Senior career*
Years	Team	Apps	(Gls)
2013–2015	Las Palmas B	14	(0)
2015–2016	Pobla Mafumet	0	(0)
2016–2017	Tenerife B	26	(3)
2016	Tenerife	2	(0)
2017	Alcorcón B	8	(0)
2017–2018	Gavà	1	(0)
2018–2019	Algeciras	41	(3)
2020	San Roque de Lepe	3	(1)
2020–2021	Arucas	24	(4)
2021–2022	Unión Viera	10	(0)
2022–	Villa Santa Brígida	62	(3)
- * Club domestic league appearances and goals as of 5 October 2024

Alejandro "Ale" Rodríguez Marrero (born 19 August 1994), known as Ale Pipo, is a Spanish footballer who plays as an attacking midfielder for Villa Santa Brígida.

== Club career ==
Born in Las Palmas, Canary Islands, Pipo played youth football for UD Las Palmas, and made his debut as a senior with the reserves in Tercera División, in 2013. In October of that year he suffered a severe knee injury, being sidelined for more than a year.

In July 2015 Pipo signed for CF Pobla de Mafumet in Segunda División B. On 2 February of the following year, after making no appearances, he signed a two-year contract with CD Tenerife B in the fourth tier.

Pipo made his first team debut on 20 August 2016, coming on as a late substitute for Aitor Sanz in a 0–1 away loss against Córdoba CF in the Segunda División championship. On 1 February of the following year he signed for another reserve team, AD Alcorcón B also in the fourth tier.

In the summer 2018, Pipo joined Algeciras CF. On 12 August 2019 the club announced, that his contract had been terminated by mutual agreement.
