= Deven Marrero =

American baseball player (born 1990)

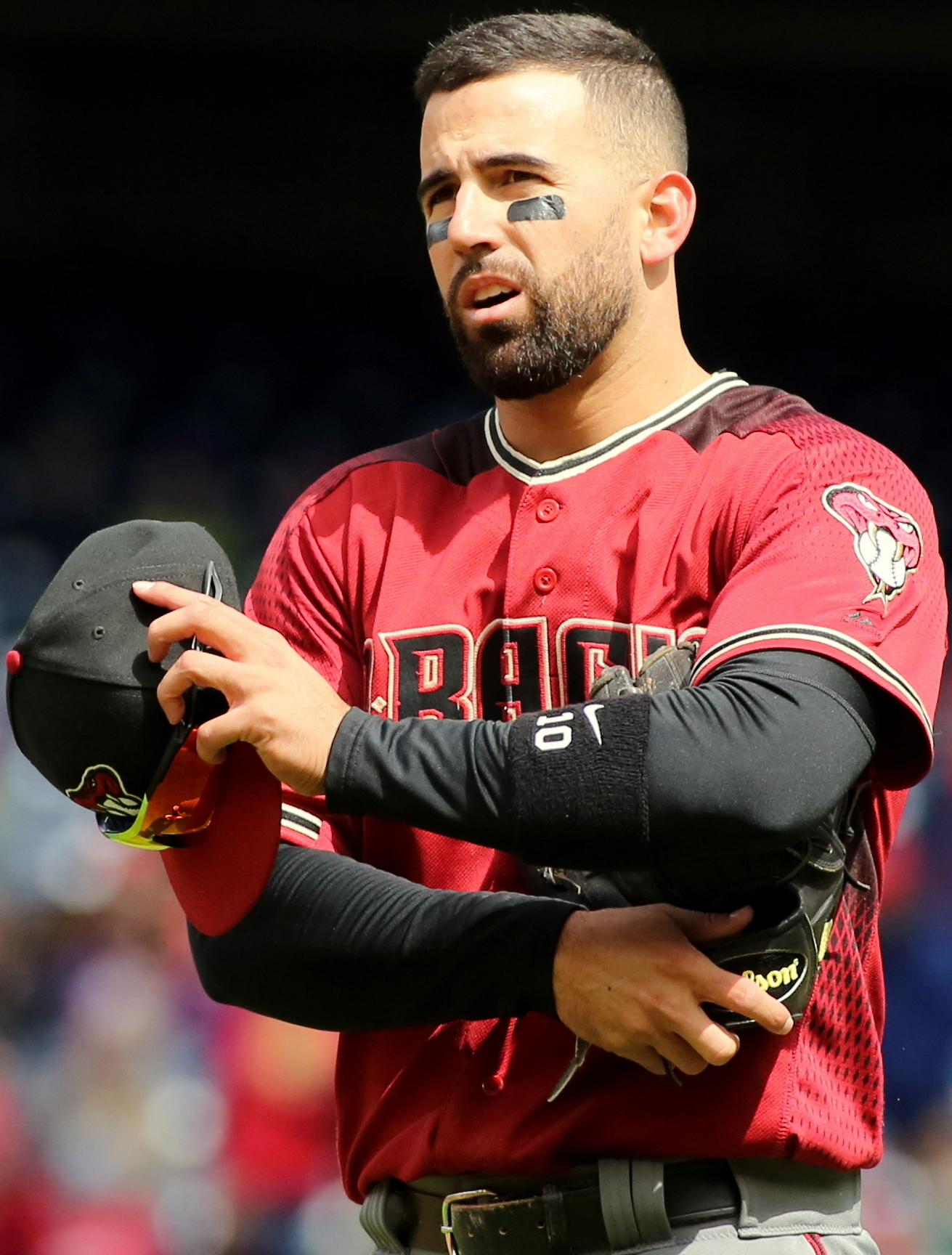
- Marrero with the Arizona Diamondbacks in 2018
- Infielder
- Born: August 25, 1990 (age 35); Miami, Florida, U.S.
- Batted: Right Threw: Right

MLB debut
- June 28, 2015, for the Boston Red Sox

Last MLB appearance
- September 10, 2022, for the New York Mets

MLB statistics
- Batting average: .191
- Home runs: 6
- Runs batted in: 38
- Stats at Baseball Reference

Teams
- Boston Red Sox (2015–2017); Arizona Diamondbacks (2018); Miami Marlins (2019, 2021); New York Mets (2022)

Deven Sommer Marrero (born August 25, 1990) is an American former professional baseball infielder. He played in Major League Baseball (MLB) for the Boston Red Sox, Arizona Diamondbacks, Miami Marlins and New York Mets.

== Early life and education ==
Marrero graduated from American Heritage School, a private school in Plantation, Florida. He enrolled at Arizona State University, and played college baseball for the Arizona State Sun Devils. As a freshman at Arizona State in 2010, he had a .397 batting average with 42 runs batted in to earn a spot on the Collegiate Baseball First Team Freshman All-American squad as well as All-Conference honorable mention honors. In the 2011 season, he was named the Pac-12 Defensive Player of the Year and earned a spot on the All-Conference first team, all while hitting a .313 average. After the 2010 and 2011 seasons, he played collegiate summer baseball with the Cotuit Kettleers of the Cape Cod Baseball League. Marrero was selected 24th overall by the Red Sox in the first round of the 2012 MLB draft.

== Career ==
=== Boston Red Sox ===
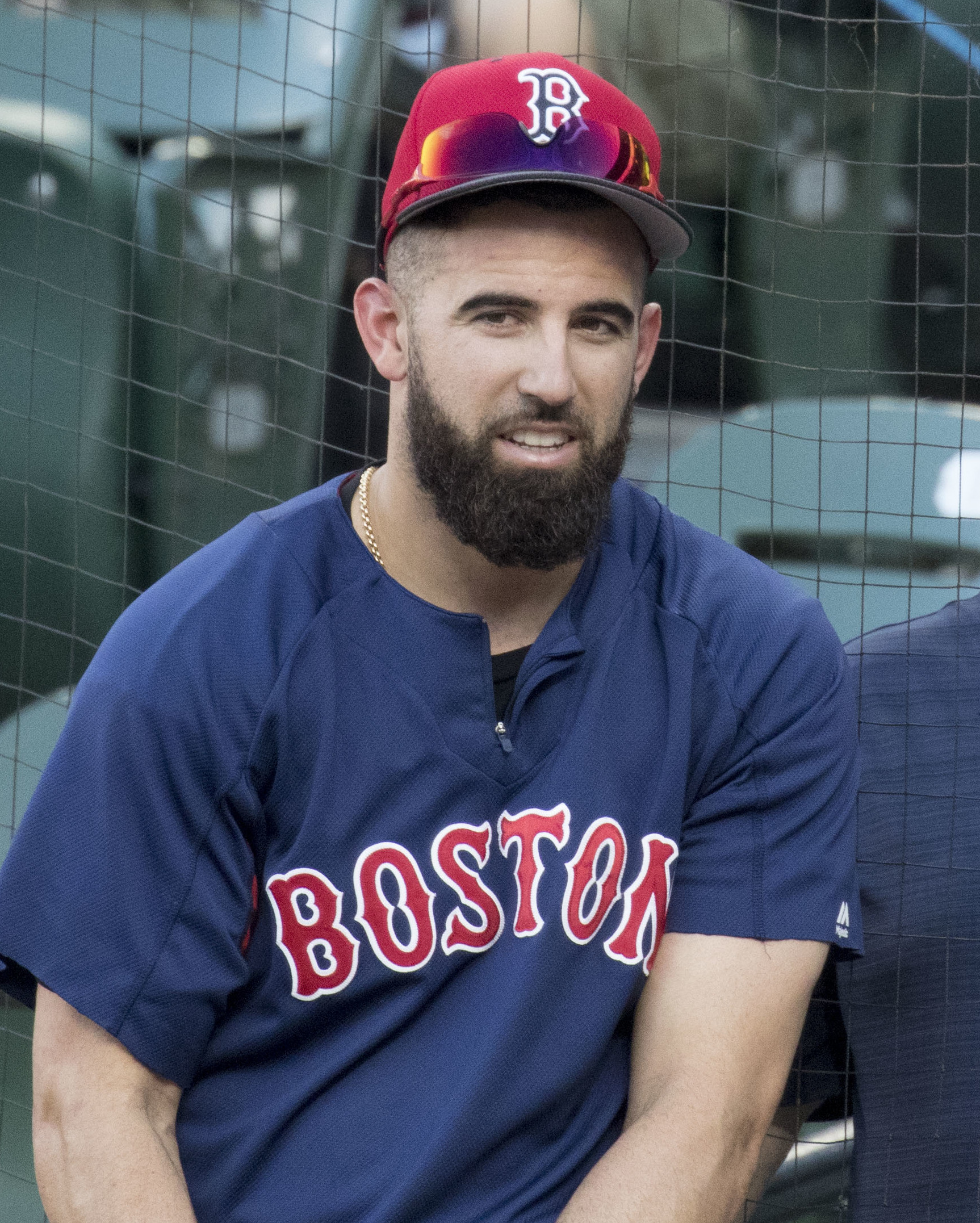
Marrero with the Boston Red Sox in 2017

Marrero began his professional career in 2012 with Single-A Lowell Spinners of the New York–Penn League, where he posted a .268/.358/.374 slash line with 19 extra-base hits, 45 runs and 24 stolen bases in 64 games.

Entering 2013, Marrero was ranked as the 11th-best prospect in the Red Sox' minor league system. He was invited to spring training, becoming the first Red Sox position player to attend spring training the season following the year he was drafted, since Scott Hatteberg in 1991 and 1992. He began the 2013 season with the Salem Red Sox and was promoted to the AA Portland Sea Dogs after hitting .256 over 85 games.

Marrero began the 2014 season with Portland and, after hitting .291 over 68 games, he was promoted to the AAA Pawtucket Red Sox. He hit .210 over 50 games with Pawtucket. Following the 2014 season, Marrero was named the Red Sox Minor League Defensive Player of the Year.

The Red Sox promoted Marrero to the major leagues on June 25, 2015. He made his major league debut against the Tampa Bay Rays on June 28 at second base after Mike Napoli was ejected in the second inning. Marrero hit his first major league home run off of Caleb Cotham of the New York Yankees on September 28, 2015. During the 2015 season, Marrero appeared in 25 games with the Red Sox, batting .226 with one home run and three RBIs.

Marrero spent most of the 2016 season with Triple-A Pawtucket, batting .256 with six home runs and 29 RBIs in 102 games. He appeared in 13 major league games, batting .083 without a home run or RBI.

Marrero took part in a four strike-out inning, which took place on July 18, 2017; pitcher Mike Bolsinger of the Toronto Blue Jays struck out Mitch Moreland, Jackie Bradley Jr. (who advanced to first on a wild pitch), Christian Vázquez, and Marrero. On August 24, 2017, Marrero was optioned to Triple-A Pawtucket after the Red Sox acquired Rajai Davis from the Oakland Athletics.

During the 2017 season, Marrero played in 71 games for the Red Sox, hitting four home runs with 27 RBIs and a .211 batting average. He appeared in one playoff game, starting at third base in Game 2 of the 2017 ALDS against the Houston Astros, striking out in both of his plate appearances before being lifted for a pinch hitter.

In his three years with the Red Sox, Marrero appeared in a total of 109 regular season games, batting .208 with five home runs and 30 RBIs.

=== Arizona Diamondbacks ===
On March 24, 2018, the Red Sox traded Marrero to the Arizona Diamondbacks for a player to be named later or cash considerations; the Red Sox later received left-handed pitcher Josh Taylor to complete the trade. With the Diamondbacks, Marrero was involved in a rare occurrence on April 14—in a game against the Los Angeles Dodgers, he hit a ball over the left-center outfield fence with two men on base, but was ruled out for passing the runner at first base (Alex Avila); as a result, Marrero was credited with a single and two RBIs, rather than a home run and three RBIs.

On August 7, 2018, Marrero was activated off the disabled list and immediately designated for assignment. He elected free agency following the season on November 2.

=== Miami Marlins ===
On December 3, 2018, Marrero signed a minor league deal with the Miami Marlins. On August 7, 2019, the Marlins selected his contract. On August 16, Marrero was designated for assignment. He elected free agency on October 1, 2019.

On April 11, 2021, Marrero signed with the Mariachis de Guadalajara of the Mexican League. However, on May 8, 2021, before the Mexican League season began, Marrero signed a minor league contract with the Miami Marlins organization. On June 16, Marrero was selected to the active roster and made his season debut that day as the starting third baseman against the St. Louis Cardinals, going 0-for-3. On June 19, Marrero was designated for assignment by Miami. He was outrighted to the Triple-A Jacksonville Jumbo Shrimp on June 21. Marrero was re-selected to the major leagues on July 23. On July 30, Marrero was once again designated for assignment by the Marlins. On August 2, he was outrighted back to Triple-A Jacksonville. The next day, he was once again selected to the Marlins roster. The following day, he once again was designated for assignment by the Marlins. On August 7, Marrero was assigned outright again to Triple-A Jacksonville. On August 9, Marrero once again had his contract selected by the Marlins. On August 16, Marrero was once again designated for assignment by the Marlins. On August 19, Marrero once again cleared waivers and was sent outright back to Triple-A Jacksonville. On September 3, the Marlins selected Marrero back to the big league roster. Marrero was designated for assignment for the fifth time on September 6. He was again outrighted to Triple-A Jacksonville. On October 1, Marrero was selected to the 40-man roster. On October 21, Marrero elected free agency.

=== Long Island Ducks ===
On April 20, 2022, Marrero signed with the Long Island Ducks of the Atlantic League of Professional Baseball. In 50 games he hit .238/.330/.300 with 1 home run, 21 RBIs and 5 stolen bases.

=== New York Mets ===
On June 25, 2022, Marrero signed a minor league deal with the New York Mets. He had his contract selected to the major league roster on August 15. Marrero was designated for assignment on August 19, following the waiver claim of Yolmer Sánchez. He cleared waivers and was sent outright to the Triple–A Syracuse Mets on August 21. Marrero had his contract selected again on September 1, as part of the team's September call–ups. He went hitless in six at–bats across five games for the Mets, and was designated for assignment again on September 12 after Luis Guillorme was activated off of the injured list. He again cleared waivers and was sent outright to Triple–A on September 16. Marrero elected free agency following the season on October 9.

== Broadcasting ==
In 2024, Marrero became one of the rotating studio analysts for Red Sox games on New England Sports Network.

== Personal life ==
Deven Marrero is the cousin of professional baseball players Chris Marrero and Christian Marrero.
