= Christian Marrero =

American baseball player and coach (born 1986)

Pittsburgh Pirates – No. 88
- Coach
- Born: July 30, 1986 (age 39); Miami, Florida, U.S.
- Bats: Left Throws: Left

Teams
- As coach: Pittsburgh Pirates (2021–present)

Christian Marrero (born July 30, 1986) is an American professional baseball coach for the Pittsburgh Pirates of Major League Baseball (MLB).

== Playing career ==
Marrero was drafted by the Chicago White Sox in the 22nd round of the 2005 MLB draft. He played in Minor League Baseball for 12 seasons for the White Sox, Atlanta Braves, Pirates, and Philadelphia Phillies organizations.

In 2016, Marrero played in 82 games for the Double-A Reading Fightin Phils, hitting .282/.422/.462 with eight home runs and 32 RBI. Marrero elected free agency following the season on November 7. He returned to the Phillies organization in 2017. He played in 14 games split between Reading and the Triple-A Lehigh Valley IronPigs, hitting .348/.434/.522 with 2 home runs and 10 RBI. Marrero elected free agency following the season on November 6, 2017.

== Coaching career ==
He served as the hitting coach for the Williamsport Crosscutters in 2018 and the Lakewood BlueClaws in 2019. The Pirates hired him as their major league assistant hitting coach before the 2021 season.

== Personal life ==
Marrero is related to several baseball players. His brother, Chris, played in major league baseball. He and Chris are the nephews of Eli Marrero and cousins of Deven Marrero and Elih Marrero, who plays in the minor leagues.
