= Henry Davis (baseball) =

American baseball player (born 1999)

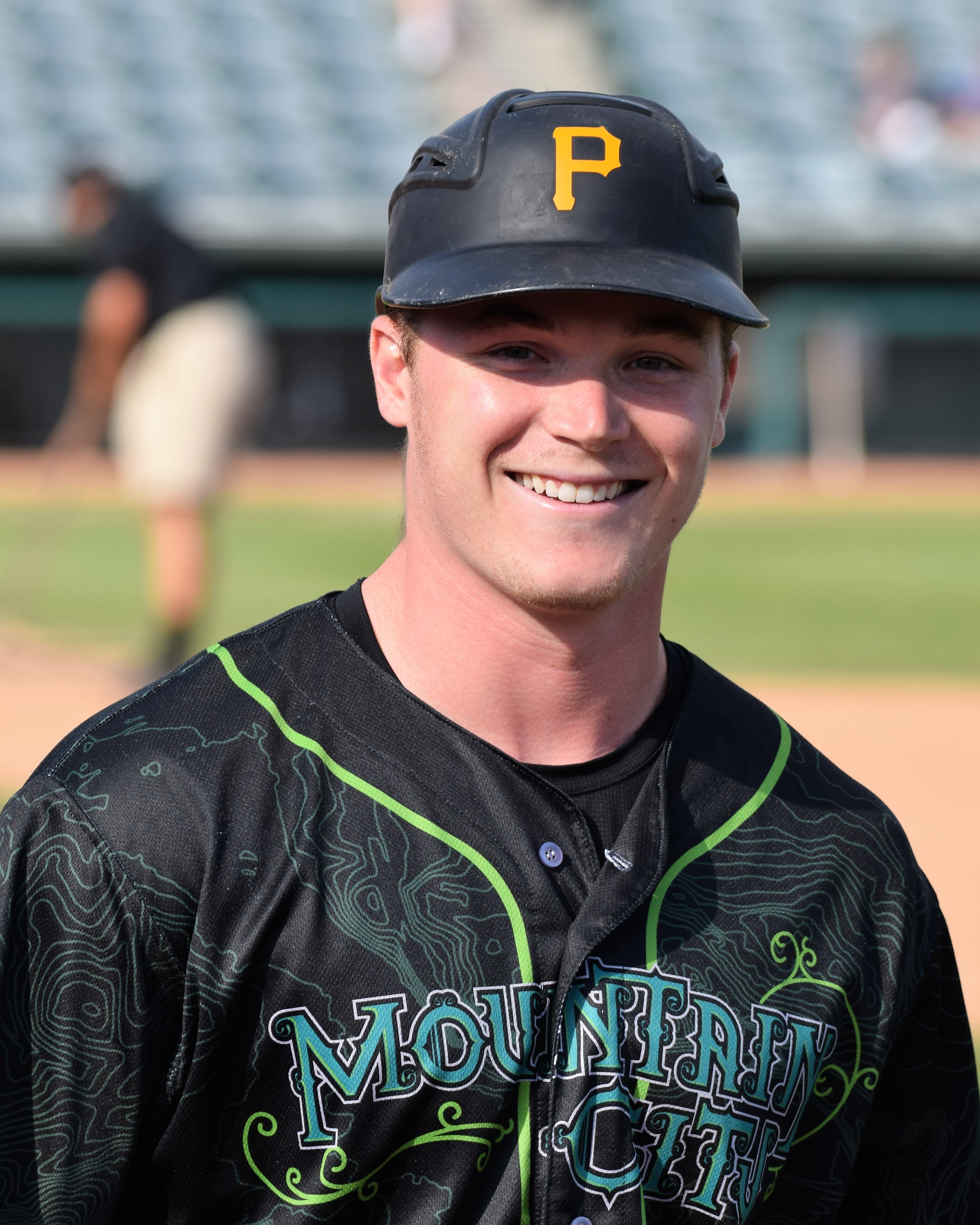
- Davis with the Altoona Curve in 2022

Pittsburgh Pirates – No. 32
- Catcher / Right fielder
- Born: September 21, 1999 (age 27); Bedford, New York, U.S.
- Bats: Right Throws: Right

MLB debut
- June 19, 2023, for the Pittsburgh Pirates

MLB statistics (through 2026 season)
- Batting average: .178
- Home runs: 25
- Runs batted in: 89
- Stats at Baseball Reference

Teams
- Pittsburgh Pirates (2023–present)

Henry Davis (born September 21, 1999) is an American professional baseball catcher and right fielder for the Pittsburgh Pirates of Major League Baseball (MLB). He played college baseball for the University of Louisville. Davis was the first overall selection in the 2021 MLB draft, and made his MLB debut in 2023.

== Amateur career ==
Davis attended Fox Lane High School in Bedford, New York. As a junior in 2017, he batted .429. In 2018, his senior year, he batted .441 with seven home runs and 32 runs batted in (RBI). He was named the Perfect Game New York Player of the Year, the Section 1 Player of the Year, and also earned all-state honors. He was undrafted in the 2018 Major League Baseball draft and enrolled at the University of Louisville to play college baseball for the Louisville Cardinals.

In 2019, Davis' freshman season at Louisville, he appeared in 45 games (making 35 starts) and batted .280/.345/.386 with three home runs and 23 RBI. After the 2019 season, he played collegiate summer baseball with the Bourne Braves of the Cape Cod Baseball League, and had two hits in 15 at bats. As a sophomore in 2020, he hit .372/.481/.698 with three home runs and 13 RBI over 14 games before the season was cancelled due to the COVID-19 pandemic. For the 2021 season, Davis hit .370/.482/.663 with 15 home runs and 48 RBI while registering 31 walks and 24 strikeouts over fifty games. In college, he exclusively played catcher on defense. He was named to the All-Atlantic Coast Conference First-Team and also garnered All-American honors.

== Professional career ==
The Pittsburgh Pirates selected Davis with the first overall selection of the 2021 Major League Baseball draft. On July 18, 2021, Davis signed with Pittsburgh for a $6.5 million signing bonus. Davis made his professional debut with the Rookie-level Florida Complex League Pirates on August 3, homering in his third at-bat of the game. After two games, he was promoted to the Greensboro Grasshoppers of the High-A East. After six games with Greensboro, he was placed on the injured list with an oblique injury and missed the remainder of the season. Over eight games for the 2021 season, Davis batted .308 in 26 at-bats with three home runs and seven RBIs, while playing catcher.

Davis returned to Greensboro to open the 2022 season. After batting .342/.450/.585 with five home runs and 22 RBI over 22 games with Greensboro, he was promoted to the Altoona Curve of the Double-A Eastern League in early May. After two games with the Curve, he was placed on the injured list with a wrist injury. He returned to play in mid-June. He was selected to represent the Pirates alongside Mike Burrows at the 2022 All-Star Futures Game. In early July, he was placed back on the injured list with an injury to the same wrist. Over 59 games for the season, Davis batted .264/.380/.472 with ten home runs and 42 RBI, almost exclusively playing catcher. He was selected to play in the Arizona Fall League for the Surprise Saguaros after the season, and in 50 at bats hit .260/.435/.440.

To open the 2023 season, Davis returned to Altoona. After hitting .284/.433/.541 with 10 home runs in 41 games, Davis was promoted to the Triple-A Indianapolis Indians on June 4, 2023. On June 18, after 10 games in Indianapolis in which he batted .286/.432/.514, the Pirates announced that Davis would be promoted to the major leagues for the first time the following day. He was formally selected to the 40-man roster the following day. He was subsequently slotted into the lineup batting seventh as the starting right fielder in the team's game against the Chicago Cubs. On his first at-bat of the game and in his major league career, he hit a double. On July 21, Davis hit two home runs off of Los Angeles Angels starter Shohei Ohtani. In doing so, he became the first player to hit two home runs off of Ohtani in the same game in Ohtani's career. Davis spent the remainder of the 2023 season on Pittsburgh's major league roster, although he missed time during the season due to a right hand strain and played a rehab assignment with Indianapolis. He played in 62 games for the Pirates, mainly in right field, and batted .213 with seven home runs and 24 RBI.

Davis was named to Pittburgh's Opening Day roster to begin the 2024 season and was expected to be the club's starting catcher. On May 5, 2024, the Pirates optioned Davis to Indianapolis after he batted .162/.280/.206 in 23 games. On June 4, the Pirates recalled Davis to the major leagues, but he was placed on the injured list with a concussion on June 15. His return was delayed after he reported headaches and nausea while on a rehab assignment with Altoona. He was activated from the injured list on July 7 and optioned to Indianapolis. He was recalled by the Pirates once more on August 26 before being placed back on the injured list with left hand inflammation, ending his season. Across 37 appearances for Pittsburgh in 2024, Davis struggled to a .144/.242/.212 batting line with one home run and five RBI.

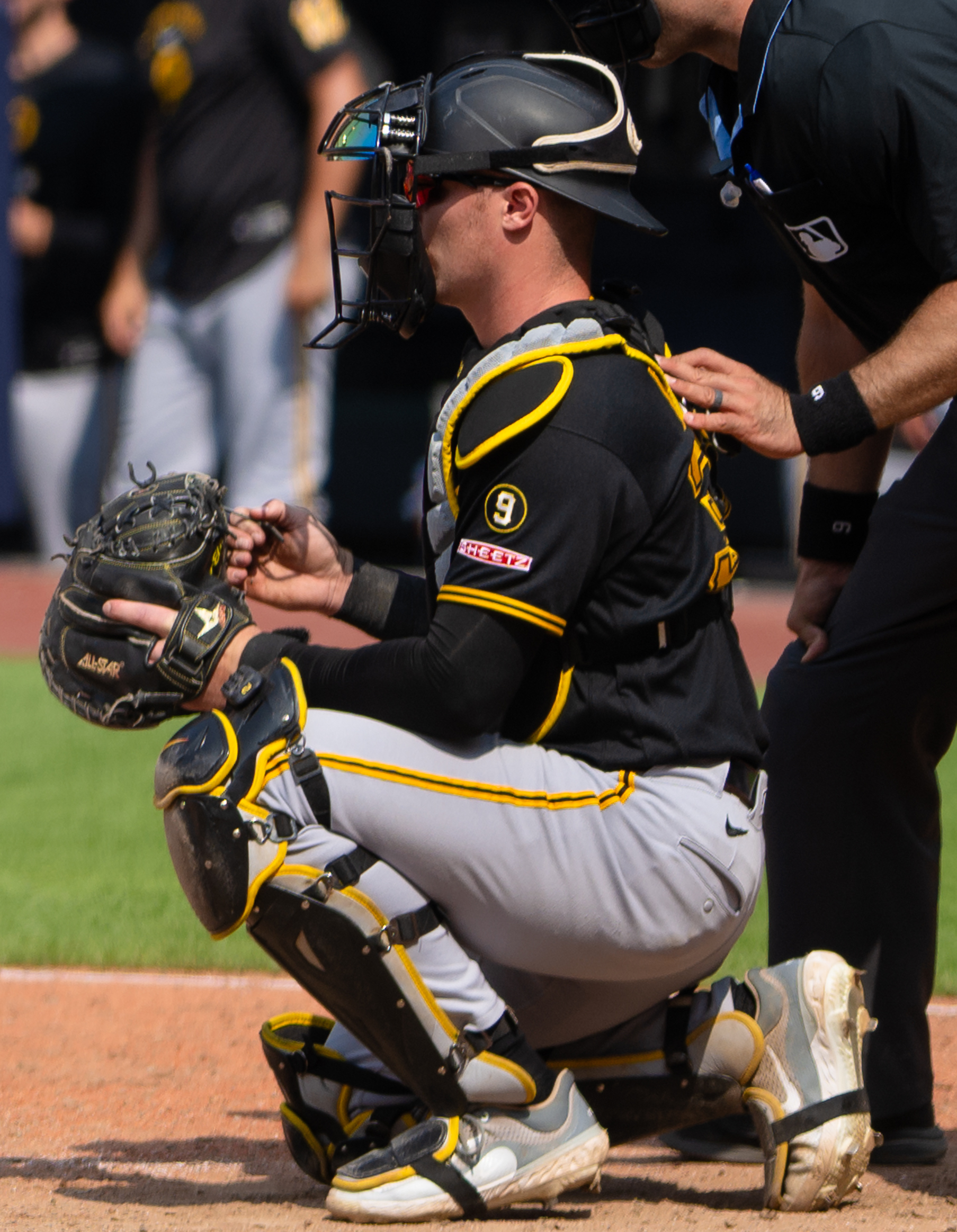
Davis with the Pirates in 2026

Davis was optioned to Triple-A Indianapolis to begin the 2025 season. On April 12, 2025, the Pirates announced that Davis would be called up to the major leagues. On April 14, 2025, Davis and Paul Skenes became the first-ever battery of No. 1 overall draft picks on April 14 against the Washington Nationals; Skenes was the first pick in 2023, while Davis was the first pick in 2021. Davis played the remainder of the 2025 season with Pittsburgh, playing catcher, and hit .167 with seven home runs and 22 RBI across 87 games.

Davis opened the 2026 season with Pittsburgh and was the team's starting catcher on Opening Day. He played the entire season with the Pirates and batted .172 with 10 home runs and 38 RBI across 97 games.
