= 2026 Pittsburgh Pirates season =

2026 Pittsburgh Pirates
- League: National League
- Division: Central
- Ballpark: PNC Park
- City: Pittsburgh, Pennsylvania (Note: From 1882–1906, the team played in Allegheny, Pennsylvania, which became annexed by Pittsburgh as the North Side in 1907.)
- Record: 82–80 (.506)
- Divisional place: 3rd
- Owner: Bob Nutting
- General manager: Ben Cherington
- Manager: Don Kelly
- Television: SportsNet Pittsburgh
- Radio: KDKA-FM; Pittsburgh Pirates Radio Network
- Stats: ESPN.com; Baseball Reference

The 2026 Pittsburgh Pirates season was the franchise's 145th season overall, as well their 140th season as a member of the National League, and the 26th season at PNC Park. This was top prospect Konnor Griffin's first season in the majors after being called up on April 2.

The Pirates were able to secure their best record since the 2018 season with a win on September 18th. However, they were subsequently eliminated from postseason contention for the eleventh consecutive year the same day. With a win against the Detroit Tigers on September 27th—the final game of the season, the Pirates ended an eight year long streak of losing seasons.

== Season standings ==
=== National League Central ===
NL Central
Team	W	L	Pct.	GB	Home	Road
Milwaukee Brewers	103	59	.636	—	55‍–‍26	48‍–‍33
Chicago Cubs	89	73	.549	14	46‍–‍35	43‍–‍38
Pittsburgh Pirates	82	80	.506	21	44‍–‍37	38‍–‍43
St. Louis Cardinals	77	85	.475	26	38‍–‍43	39‍–‍42
Cincinnati Reds	75	87	.463	28	38‍–‍43	37‍–‍44

=== National League Wild Card ===
Division leaders
Team	W	L	Pct.
Milwaukee Brewers	103	59	.636
Los Angeles Dodgers	100	62	.617
Atlanta Braves	94	68	.580

Wild Card teams (Top 3 teams qualify for postseason)
Team	W	L	Pct.	GB
San Diego Padres	91	71	.562	+3
Chicago Cubs	89	73	.549	+1
Philadelphia Phillies	88	74	.543	—
Arizona Diamondbacks	86	76	.531	2
Pittsburgh Pirates	82	80	.506	6
Miami Marlins	80	82	.494	8
St. Louis Cardinals	77	85	.475	11
Washington Nationals	77	85	.475	11
Cincinnati Reds	75	87	.463	13
New York Mets	74	88	.457	14
San Francisco Giants	65	97	.401	23
Colorado Rockies	58	104	.358	30

=== Record vs. opponents ===
2026 National League record Source: MLB Standings Grid – 2026
Team	AZ	ATL	CHC	CIN	COL	LAD	MIA	MIL	NYM	PHI	PIT	SD	SF	STL	WSH	AL
Arizona	—	4–3	2–4	4–2	9–4	7–6	1–5	2–4	4–2	3–3	3–3	6–7	10–3	5–2	2–4	24–24
Atlanta	3–4	—	3–3	3–3	6–0	5–1	9–4	3–3	6–7	9–4	5–1	3–4	1–5	2–4	9–4	27–21
Chicago	4–2	3–3	—	9–4	3–3	4–2	3–3	4–9	7–0	6–1	7–6	5–1	3–3	6–7	3–3	22–26
Cincinnati	2–4	3–3	4–9	—	4–2	1–6	3–4	4–9	4–2	3–3	6–7	3–3	3–3	5–8	1–5	29–19
Colorado	4–9	0–6	3–3	2–4	—	3–10	2–5	1–5	4–2	2–4	3–3	2–11	7–6	2–4	3–4	20–28
Los Angeles	6–7	1–5	2–4	6–1	10–3	—	2–4	3–4	5–1	4–2	5–1	8–5	9–4	2–4	6–0	31–17
Miami	5–1	4–9	3–3	4–3	5–2	4–2	—	1–5	6–7	5–8	4–2	0–6	4–2	4–2	9–4	22–26
Milwaukee	4–2	3–3	9–4	9–4	5–1	4–3	5–1	—	4–2	4–2	6–7	2–4	3–4	11–2	2–4	32–16
New York	2–4	7–6	0–7	2–4	2–4	1–5	7–6	2–4	—	6–7	4–2	4–2	5–2	2–4	7–6	23–25
Philadelphia	3–3	4–9	1–6	3–3	4–2	2–4	8–5	2–4	7–6	—	5–2	6–0	4–2	4–2	9–4	26–22
Pittsburgh	3–3	1–5	6–7	7–6	3–3	1–5	2–4	7–6	2–4	2–5	—	3–3	3–3	6–7	4–3	32–16
San Diego	7–6	4–3	1–5	3–3	11–2	5–8	6–0	4–2	2–4	0–6	3–3	—	9–4	3–4	4–2	29–19
San Francisco	3–10	5–1	3–3	3–3	6–7	4–9	2–4	4–3	2–5	2–4	3–3	4–9	—	5–1	3–3	16–32
St. Louis	2–5	4–2	7–6	8–5	4–2	4–2	2–4	2–11	4–2	2–4	7–6	4–3	1–5	—	3–3	23–25
Washington	4–2	4–9	3–3	5–1	4–3	0–6	4–9	4–2	6–7	4–9	3–4	2–4	3–3	3–3	—	28–20

Updated with the results of all games through September 27, 2026.

== Regular season ==
=== Opening day lineup ===
Order	No.	Player	Pos.
Batters
1	15	Oneil Cruz	CF
2	5	Brandon Lowe	2B
3	10	Bryan Reynolds	LF
4	24	Marcell Ozuna	DH
5	29	Ryan O'Hearn	RF
6	19	Jared Triolo	SS
7	2	Spencer Horwitz	1B
8	3	Nick Gonzales	3B
9	32	Henry Davis	C
Starting pitcher
—	30	Paul Skenes	

== Game log ==
Legend
	Pirates win
	Pirates loss
	Postponement
	Eliminated from playoff race
**Bold**	Pirates team member

2026 Game Log: 82–80 (Home: 44–37; Away: 38–43)
March/April: 16–16 (Home: 8–9; Road: 8–7)

#	Date	Opponent	Score	Win	Loss	Save	Attendance	Record	Streak
1	March 26	@ Mets	7–11	Peralta (1–0)	**Skenes** (0–1)	—	41,449	0–1	L1
2	March 28	@ Mets	2–4 (11)	Lovelady (1–0)	**Barco** (0–1)	—	37,183	0–2	L2
3	March 29	@ Mets	4–3 (10)	**Santana** (1–0)	Lovelady (1–1)	—	36,940	1–2	W1
4	March 30	@ Reds	0–2	Burns (1–0)	**Ashcraft** (0–1)	Phillips (1)	13,626	1–3	L1
5	March 31	@ Reds	8–3	**Ramírez** (1–0)	Williamson (0–1)	—	22,390	2–3	W1
6	April 1	@ Reds	8–3	**Skenes** (1–1)	Abbott (0–1)	—	15,007	3–3	W2
7	April 3	Orioles	5–4	**Keller** (1–0)	Bradish (0–2)	**Soto** (1)	38,986	4–3	W3
8	April 4	Orioles	3–2	**Santana** (2–0)	Helsley (0–1)	—	27,949	5–3	W4
9	April 5	Orioles	8–2	**Ashcraft** (1–1)	Bassitt (0–2)	—	11,956	6–3	W5
10	April 6	Padres	0–5	Márquez (1–1)	**Chandler** (0–1)	—	8,446	6–4	L1
11	April 7	Padres	7–1	**Skenes** (2–1)	Pivetta (1–2)	—	9,061	7–4	W1
12	April 8	Padres	2–8	King (1–1)	**Lawrence** (0–1)	—	10,046	7–5	L1
13	April 10	@ Cubs	2–0	**Montgomery** (1–0)	Thielbar (1–1)	**Santana** (1)	28,811	8–5	W1
14	April 11	@ Cubs	4–3 (11)	**Ramírez** (2–0)	Thielbar (1–2)	—	34,049	9–5	W2
15	April 12	@ Cubs	6–7	Palencia (1–0)	**Urquidy** (0–1)	—	35,711	9–6	L1
16	April 13	Nationals	16–5	**Skenes** (3–1)	Cavalli (0–1)	—	11,532	10–6	W1
17	April 14	Nationals	4–5	Parker (1–0)	**Keller** (1–1)	Varland (2)	9,423	10–7	L1
18	April 15	Nationals	2–0	**Mlodzinski** (1–0)	Irvin (1–2)	**Santana** (2)	11,244	11–7	W1
19	April 16	Nationals	7–8	Beeter (1–0)	**Santana** (2–1)	Ribalta (1)	10,504	11–8	L1
20	April 17	Rays	5–1	**Chandler** (1–1)	Martinez (0–1)	—	24,198	12–8	W1
21	April 18	Rays	7–8 (13)	Jax (1–2)	**Ramírez** (2–1)	Gómez (1)	37,773	12–9	L1
22	April 19	Rays	6–3	**Keller** (2–1)	McClanahan (1–2)	—	13,439	13–9	W1
23	April 21	@ Rangers	1–5	Rocker (1–1)	**Mlodzinski** (1–1)	—	23,910	13–10	L1
24	April 22	@ Rangers	8–4	**Soto** (1–0)	Winn (1–1)	—	24,289	14–10	W1
25	April 23	@ Rangers	1–6	deGrom (2–0)	**Chandler** (1–2)	—	24,430	14–11	L1
26	April 24	@ Brewers	6–0	**Skenes** (4–1)	Woodruff (2–1)	—	33,339	15–11	W1
27	April 25	@ Brewers	6–3 (10)	**Soto** (2–0)	Zerpa (0–2)	**Ramírez** (1)	40,408	16–11	W2
28	April 26	@ Brewers	0–5	Harrison (2–1)	**Mlodzinski** (1–2)	—	31,500	16–12	L1
29	April 27	Cardinals	2–4	Fernandez (1–0)	**Santana** (2–2)	Soriano (1)	9,787	16–13	L2
30	April 28	Cardinals	7–11	Leahy (3–3)	**Ashcraft** (1–2)	—	8,758	16–14	L3
31	April 29	Cardinals	4–5	Pallante (3–2)	**Chandler** (1–3)	O'Brien (8)	9,297	16–15	L4
32	April 30	Cardinals	5–10	Graceffo (2–0)	**Skenes** (4–2)	—	12,143	16–16	L5

May: 16–12 (Home: 10–6; Road: 6–6)

#	Date	Opponent	Score	Win	Loss	Save	Attendance	Record	Streak
33	May 1	Reds	9–1	**Keller** (3–1)	Singer (2–2)	—	13,442	17–16	W1
34	May 2	Reds	17–7	**Mlodzinski** (2–2)	Lowder (3–2)	—	23,763	18–16	W2
35	May 3	Reds	1–0	**Soto** (3–0)	Santillan (1–1)	—	16,642	19–16	W3
36	May 5	@ Diamondbacks	0–9	Rodríguez (3–0)	**Chandler** (1–4)	—	22,410	19–17	L1
37	May 6	@ Diamondbacks	1–0	**Skenes** (5–2)	Soroka (4–2)	**Soto** (2)	21,719	20–17	W1
38	May 7	@ Diamondbacks	4–2	**Keller** (4–1)	Gallen (1–3)	**Soto** (3)	21,827	21–17	W2
39	May 8	@ Giants	2–5	Ray (3–4)	**Mlodzinski** (2–3)	—	41,024	21–18	L1
40	May 9	@ Giants	13–3	**Ashcraft** (2–2)	Roupp (5–3)	—	40,417	22–18	W1
41	May 10	@ Giants	6–7 (10)	Borucki (1–1)	**Lawrence** (0–2)	—	41,085	22–19	L1
42	May 12	Rockies	3–1	**Skenes** (6–2)	Lorenzen (2–5)	**Soto** (4)	13,516	23–19	W1
43	May 13	Rockies	4–10	Senzatela (3–0)	**Keller** (4–2)	—	10,554	23–20	L1
44	May 14	Rockies	7–2	**Mlodzinski** (3–3)	Dollander (3–3)	—	19,101	24–20	W1
45	May 15	Phillies	9–11 (10)	Alvarado (1–1)	**Santana** (2–3)	Kerkering (1)	29,998	24–21	L1
46	May 16	Phillies	0–6	Sánchez (5–2)	**Chandler** (1–5)	—	31,296	24–22	L2
47	May 17	Phillies	0–6	Wheeler (3–0)	**Skenes** (6–3)	—	37,820	24–23	L3
48	May 19	@ Cardinals	6–9 (10)	Soriano (2–0)	**Montgomery** (1–1)	—	22,958	24–24	L4
49	May 20	@ Cardinals	7–0	**Mlodzinski** (4–3)	McGreevy (3–3)	—	27,185	25–24	W1
50	May 21	@ Cardinals	6–2	**Ashcraft** (3–2)	May (3–5)	—	27,705	26–24	W2
51	May 22	@ Blue Jays	2–6	Gausman (4–3)	**Chandler** (1–6)	Varland (7)	39,839	26–25	L1
52	May 23	@ Blue Jays	2–5	Corbin (2–1)	**Skenes** (6–4)	Hoffman (5)	41,813	26–26	L2
53	May 24	@ Blue Jays	4–1	**Keller** (5–2)	Cease (3–3)	**Soto** (5)	41,354	27–26	W1
54	May 25	Cubs	2–1	**Dotel** (1–0)	Thornton (2–1)	**Soto** (6)	22,174	28–26	W2
55	May 26	Cubs	12–1	**Ashcraft** (4–2)	Wicks (0–1)	—	13,950	29–26	W3
56	May 27	Cubs	4–10	Webb (1–1)	**Ramírez** (2–2)	—	12,340	29–27	L1
57	May 28	Cubs	2–7	Rea (5–3)	**Skenes** (6–5)	—	19,121	29–28	L2
58	May 29	Twins	6–5	**Soto** (4–0)	Rogers (1–2)	—	27,107	30–28	W1
59	May 30	Twins	10–9	**Ramírez** (3–2)	Ober (6–3)	**Soto** (7)	24,272	31–28	W2
60	May 31	Twins	9–3	**Ashcraft** (5–2)	Matthews (1–3)	—	19,358	32–28	W3

June: 11–15 (Home: 5–7; Road: 6–8)

#	Date	Opponent	Score	Win	Loss	Save	Attendance	Record	Streak
61	June 2	@ Astros	10–6	**Chandler** (2–6)	Burrows (3–7)	**Soto** (8)	25,513	33–28	W4
62	June 3	@ Astros	9–11	Blubaugh (3–2)	**Soto** (4–1)	Hader (1)	26,956	33–29	L1
63	June 4	@ Astros	5–1	**Jones** (1–0)	Teng (3–4)	**Mlodzinski** (1)	23,136	34–29	W1
64	June 5	@ Braves	3–6	Pérez (4–3)	**Keller** (5–3)	Iglesias (12)	39,418	34–30	L1
65	June 6	@ Braves	3–6	Strider (4–1)	**Ashcraft** (5–3)	Iglesias (13)	40,276	34–31	L2
66	June 7	@ Braves	2–3	López (3–1)	**Chandler** (2–7)	Fuentes (1)	37,697	34–32	L3
67	June 9	Dodgers	3–12	Klein (2–2)	**Dotel** (1–1)	—	30,646	34–33	L4
68	June 10	Dodgers	9–8	**Sisk** (1–0)	Hurt (1–1)	**Soto** (9)	30,626	35–33	W1
69	June 11	Dodgers	6–8	Dreyer (3–1)	**Keller** (5–4)	Scott (7)	30,660	35–34	L1
70	June 12	Marlins	3–8	Alcántara (6–4)	**Dotel** (1–2)	—	19,587	35–35	L2
71	June 13	Marlins	3–2	**Ramírez** (4–2)	Bender (1–1)	**Soto** (10)	31,192	36–35	W1
72	June 14	Marlins	2–4	Meyer (7–0)	**Skenes** (6–6)	Fairbanks (9)	18,127	36–36	L1
73	June 15	@ Athletics	2–11	Ginn (5–3)	**Jones** (1–1)	—	10,033	36–37	L2
74	June 16	@ Athletics	6–5	**Montgomery** (2–1)	Alvarado (2–1)	**Soto** (11)	8,615	37–37	W1
75	June 17	@ Athletics	12–4	**Ashcraft** (6–3)	Civale (5–3)	—	9,024	38–37	W2
76	June 19	@ Rockies	3–4	Senzatela (7–0)	**Montgomery** (2–2)	—	33,596	38–38	L1
77	June 20	@ Rockies	1–2	Sugano (8–4)	**Skenes** (6–7)	Hill (2)	40,380	38–39	L2
78	June 21	@ Rockies	8–6	**Ramírez** (5–2)	Lorenzen (2–9)	—	38,912	39–39	W1
79	June 23	Mariners	2–3	Kirby (6–7)	**Keller** (5–5)	Muñoz (14)	16,015	39–40	L1
80	June 24	Mariners	11–1	**Ashcraft** (7–3)	Woo (6–6)	**Mlodzinski** (2)	18,750	40–40	W1
81	June 25	Mariners	5–1	**Chandler** (3–7)	Miller (3–2)	—	24,367	41–40	W2
82	June 26	Reds	4–6	Burke (3–3)	**Montgomery** (2–3)	Ferguson (1)	25,186	41–41	L1
83	June 27	Reds	7–9	Ferguson (1–0)	**Soto** (4–2)	Petty (1)	30,077	41–42	L2
84	June 28	Reds	9–4	**Keller** (6–5)	Singer (3–7)	—	24,023	42–42	W1
85	June 29	@ Phillies	11–7	**Ashcraft** (8–3)	Nola (3–5)	—	39,791	43–42	W2
86	June 30	@ Phillies	0–8	Sánchez (10–3)	**Chandler** (3–8)	—	41,710	43–43	L1

July: 12–13 (Home: 6–6; Road: 6–7)

#	Date	Opponent	Score	Win	Loss	Save	Attendance	Record	Streak
87	July 1	@ Phillies	6–10	Kerkering (6–0)	**Skenes** (6–8)	—	41,766	43–44	L2
88	July 2	@ Phillies	6–1	**Mlodzinski** (5–3)	Alvarado (3–3)	—	37,851	44–44	W1
89	July 3	@ Nationals	5–9	Griffin (9–2)	**Keller** (6–6)	—	30,331	44–45	L1
90	July 4	@ Nationals	7–1	**Ashcraft** (9–3)	Palmquist (0–1)	—	28,125	45–45	W1
91	July 5	@ Nationals	11–5	**Soto** (5–2)	Lord (5–2)	—	19,587	46–45	W2
92	July 7	Braves	12–4	**Skenes** (7–8)	Waldrep (0–1)	—	20,281	47–45	W3
93	July 8	Braves	0–3	Dodd (1–0)	**Santana** (2–4)	Iglesias (18)	20,062	47–46	L1
94	July 9	Braves	5–10	Dodd (2–0)	**Keller** (6–7)	—	20,895	47–47	L2
―	July 10	Brewers	**Postponed (rain)** (Makeup date: July 11)						
95	July 11 (1)	Brewers	7–6	**Mlodzinski** (6–3)	Ashby (12–2)	**Soto** (12)	22,484	48–47	W1
96	July 11 (2)	Brewers	3–2	**Ramírez** (6–2)	Drohan (4–3)	**Montgomery** (1)	29,080	49–47	W2
97	July 12	Brewers	14–5	**Skenes** (8–8)	Gasser (2–4)	—	34,087	50–47	W3
**96th All-Star Game in Philadelphia, PA**
―	July 17	@ Guardians	**Postponed (rain)** (Makeup date: July 18)						
98	July 18 (1)	@ Guardians	7–1	**Jones** (2–1)	Williams (10–5)	—	27,989	51–47	W4
99	July 18 (2)	@ Guardians	3–5	Smith (3–1)	**Santana** (2–5)	—	32,997	51–48	L1
100	July 19	@ Guardians	7–1	**Skenes** (9–8)	Cantillo (8–5)	—	31,973	52–48	W1
101	July 20	@ Yankees	5–8	Chivilli (1–0)	**Ashcraft** (9–4)	Cruz (2)	42,348	52–49	L1
―	July 21	@ Yankees	**Postponed (rain)** (Makeup date: July 22)						
102	July 22 (1)	@ Yankees	5–3 (10)	**Montgomery** (3–3)	Cruz (4–4)	**Soto** (13)	43,290	53–49	W1
103	July 22 (2)	@ Yankees	0–2	Blackburn (3–1)	**Eisert** (2–2)	Hill (1)	41,064	53–50	L1
104	July 24	Cubs	2–3 (10)	Thielbar (3–2)	**Ramírez** (6–3)	Hollowell (1)	33,593	53–51	L2
105	July 25	Cubs	0–11	Imanaga (7–8)	**Skenes** (9–9)	Assad (1)	39,105	53–52	L3
106	July 26	Cubs	8–7	**Ashcraft** (10–4)	Taillon (2–6)	**Montgomery** (2)	32,921	54–52	W1
107	July 27	Diamondbacks	3–2 (10)	**Montgomery** (4–3)	Clarke (2–2)	—	15,412	55–52	W2
108	July 28	Diamondbacks	7–8 (12)	Carrillo (1–0)	**Dotel** (1–3)	—	19,024	55–53	L1
109	July 29	Diamondbacks	0–3	Rodríguez (10–3)	**Jones** (2–2)	Garcia (1)	19,716	55–54	L2
110	July 30	@ Reds	2–3	Pagán (3–1)	**Soto** (5–3)	—	25,532	55–55	L3
111	July 31	@ Reds	7–8	Pagán (4–1)	**Dotel** (1–4)	—	30,618	55–56	L4

August: 12–15 (Home: 5–4; Road: 7–11)

#	Date	Opponent	Score	Win	Loss	Save	Attendance	Record	Streak
112	August 1	@ Reds	4–1	**Ashcraft** (11–4)	Abbott (5–7)	**Soto** (14)	27,616	56–56	W1
113	August 2	@ Reds	2–10	Burns (13–1)	**Keller** (6–8)	—	23,878	56–57	L1
114	August 3	@ Brewers	4–3	**Chandler** (4–8)	Sproat (3–7)	**Montgomery** (3)	30,684	57–57	W1
115	August 4	@ Brewers	2–4	Henderson (6–1)	**Jones** (2–3)	Megill (19)	30,014	57–58	L1
116	August 5	@ Brewers	2–4	Harrison (9–2)	**Skenes** (9–10)	Megill (20)	33,528	57–59	L2
117	August 6	@ Brewers	2–5	May (6–7)	**Ashcraft** (11–5)	Patrick (5)	38,145	57–60	L3
118	August 7	Mets	4–6	Thornton (3–2)	**Mlodzinski** (6–4)	—	33,497	57–61	L4
119	August 8	Mets	9–0	**Chandler** (5–8)	Stock (0–2)	—	30,121	58–61	W1
120	August 9	Mets	1–11	Manaea (4–5)	**Jones** (2–4)	—	22,753	58–62	L1
121	August 11	@ Marlins	0–2	Pérez (6–9)	**Skenes** (9–11)	Fairbanks (18)	9,366	58–63	L2
122	August 12	@ Marlins	2–8	Junk (6–7)	**Mlodzinski** (6–5)	—	7,441	58–64	L3
123	August 13	@ Marlins	13–1	**Ashcraft** (12–5)	Phillips (3–6)	—	8,223	59–64	W1
124	August 14	Red Sox	8–4	**Chandler** (6–8)	Bennett (7–6)	**Montgomery** (4)	32,036	60–64	W2
125	August 15	Red Sox	0–4	Gray (15–3)	**Jones** (2–5)	—	38,408	60–65	L1
126	August 16	Red Sox	8–3	**Yates** (1–5)	Sandoval (1–2)	—	25,575	61–65	W1
127	August 17	Tigers	5–8	Valdez (8–8)	**Mlodzinski** (6–6)	Jansen (16)	21,956	61–66	L1
128	August 18	Tigers	4–1	**Ashcraft** (13–5)	Montero (9–8)	**Montgomery** (5)	20,222	62–66	W1
129	August 19	Tigers	4–3	**Montgomery** (5–3)	Jansen (3–5)	—	18,208	63–66	W2
130	August 21	@ Dodgers	4–5 (10)	Phillips (1–2)	**Soto** (5–4)	—	51,872	63–67	L1
131	August 22	@ Dodgers	3–4	Skubal (8–7)	**Ramírez** (6–4)	Scott (19)	53,417	63–68	L2
132	August 23	@ Dodgers	0–4	Snell (2–1)	**Bachar** (1–3)	—	44,092	63–69	L3
133	August 24	@ Padres	3–2 (12)	**Yates** (2–5)	Estrada (2–3)	**Ramírez** (2)	40,447	64–69	W1
134	August 25	@ Padres	1–0	**Soto** (6–4)	Miller (4–2)	**Montgomery** (6)	40,709	65–69	W2
135	August 26	@ Padres	0–3	Vásquez (10–6)	**Chandler** (6–9)	Rodríguez (2)	40,413	65–70	L1
136	August 28	@ Cardinals	1–4	Mathews (1–2)	**Jones** (2–6)	Stanek (2)	22,964	65–71	L2
137	August 29	@ Cardinals	6–2	**Mlodzinski** (7–6)	Mautz (0–1)	—	26,265	66–71	W1
138	August 30	@ Cardinals	5–4	**Ashcraft** (14–5)	Liberatore (5–13)	**Montgomery** (7)	23,459	67–71	W2

September: 15–9 (Home: 10–5; Road: 5–4)

#	Date	Opponent	Score	Win	Loss	Save	Attendance	Record	Streak
139	September 1	Giants	13–12	**Montgomery** (6–3)	Seymour (0–1)	—	11,814	68–71	W3
140	September 2	Giants	4–5 (10)	Foley (2–1)	**Doval** (3–2)	Smith (4)	11,763	68–72	L1
141	September 3	Giants	5–2	**Curtis** (1–0)	Tidwell (0–2)	**Montgomery** (8)	11,578	69–72	W1
142	September 4	Angels	1–0	**Jones** (3–6)	Johnson (3–8)	**Montgomery** (9)	22,363	70–72	W2
143	September 5	Angels	1–6	Kikuchi (1–5)	**Ashcraft** (14–6)	—	25,541	70–73	L1
144	September 6	Angels	1–0	**Skenes** (10–11)	Ureña (9–10)	**Montgomery** (10)	25,530	71–73	W1
145	September 8	@ White Sox	9–3	**Chandler** (7–9)	Burke (8–7)	—	18,375	72–73	W2
146	September 9	@ White Sox	4–2	**Eisert** (3–2)	Martin (9–7)	**Montgomery** (11)	14,803	73–73	W3
147	September 10	@ White Sox	2–0	**Jones** (4–6)	Fedde (8–9)	**Montgomery** (12)	17,741	74–73	W4
148	September 11	@ Cubs	2–12	Imanaga (10–10)	**Dotel** (1–5)	—	39,190	74–74	L1
149	September 12	@ Cubs	3–4	Rolison (9–1)	**Soto** (6–5)	Zeferjahn (6)	39,422	74–75	L2
150	September 13	@ Cubs	4–3	**Chandler** (8–9)	Boyd (8–5)	**Montgomery** (13)	39,103	75–75	W1
151	September 15	Brewers	1–5	Misiorowski (15–5)	**Bachar** (1–4)	—	23,961	75–76	L1
152	September 16	Brewers	4–5	Senzatela (11–5)	**Mlodzinski** (7–7)	Megill (28)	11,393	75–77	L2
153	September 17	Brewers	7–4	**Curtis** (2–0)	Harrison (10–5)	**Montgomery** (14)	10,818	76–77	W1
154	September 18	Royals	8–5	**Ramírez** (7–4)	Pearson (2–2)	**Soto** (15)	25,424	77–77	W2
155	September 19	Royals	6–5	**Weaver** (3–1)	Cruz (2–4)	**Montgomery** (15)	21,004	78–77	W3
156	September 20	Royals	4–3	**Mlodzinski** (8–7)	Pearson (2–3)	**Montgomery** (16)	14,979	79–77	W4
157	September 22	Cardinals	2–0	**Jones** (5–6)	Pallante (12–8)	**Soto** (16)	11,375	80–77	W5
158	September 23	Cardinals	1–5	Liberatore (6–14)	**Eisert** (3–3)	—	13,176	80–78	L1
159	September 24	Cardinals	2–1	**Weaver** (4–1)	Stanek (2–3)	**Montgomery** (17)	15,822	81–78	W1
160	September 25	@ Tigers	7–8	Jobe (3–3)	**Chandler** (8–10)	Jansen (22)	36,315	81–79	L1
161	September 26	@ Tigers	3–4	Waguespack (2–2)	**Montgomery** (6–4)	—	41,377	81–80	L2
162	September 27	@ Tigers	4–2	**Bachar** (2–4)	Ryan (0–1)	**Montgomery** (18)	30,165	82–80	W1

== Roster ==
2026 Pittsburgh Pirates
Roster
Pitchers: 35 Braxton Ashcraft; 71 Lake Bachar; 45 Hunter Barco; 77 Brandan Bidois; 36 Bubba Chandler; 64 Khristian Curtis; 57 Chris Devenski; 66 Wilber Dotel; 75 Camilo Doval; 14 Brandon Eisert; 17 Jared Jones; 23 Mitch Keller; 62 Antwone Kelly; 61 Justin Lawrence; 97 Ron Marinaccio; 72 Isaac Mattson; 50 Carmen Mlodzinski; 46 Mason Montgomery; 58 Noah Murdock; 49 Yohan Ramírez; 64 Cam Sanders; 60 Dennis Santana; 48 Evan Sisk; 30 Paul Skenes; 31 Gregory Soto; 61 Hunter Stratton; 65 José Urquidy; 18 Luke Weaver; 54 Kirby Yates	Catchers: 14 Joey Bart; 32 Henry Davis; 43 Rafael Flores Jr.; 13 Endy Rodríguez; 73 Shawn Ross; Infielders: 76 Jack Brannigan; 26 Jacob Gonzalez; 3 Nick Gonzales; 6 Konnor Griffin; 2 Spencer Horwitz; 5 Brandon Lowe; 29 Ryan O'Hearn; 5 Endy Rodríguez; 19 Jared Triolo; 53 Davis Wendzel; 38 Nick Yorke	Outfielders: 37 Tyler Callihan; 25 Billy Cook; 15 Oneil Cruz; 34 Jhostynxon García; 28 Jake Mangum; 10 Bryan Reynolds; 63 Ronny Simon; 55 Esmerlyn Valdez; Other batters: 24 Marcell Ozuna	Manager: 12 Don Kelly; Coaches: -- Cam Balego (bullpen catcher); 27 Tony Beasley (third base); 67 Cibney Bello (assistant pitching); 16 Tarrik Brock (first base); 82 Jordan Comadena (catching); 52 Matt Hague (hitting); 90 Raul Hernandez (bullpen catcher); 54 Gene Lamont (special assignment); 88 Christian Marrero (assistant hitting); 95 Stephen Morales (assistant coach); 51 Bill Murphy (pitching); 41 Kristopher Negrón (bench); 87 Miguel Pérez (bullpen); 44 Chris Truby (infield); 98 Jonny Tucker (assistant hitting)

== Player stats ==
= Indicates team leader

= Indicates league leader

=== Batting ===
Note: G = Games played; AB = At bats; R = Runs scored; H = Hits; 2B = Doubles; 3B = Triples; HR = Home runs; RBI = Runs batted in; SB = Stolen bases; BB = Walks; AVG = Batting average; SLG = Slugging average

Player	G	AB	R	H	2B	3B	HR	RBI	SB	BB	AVG	SLG
Bryan Reynolds	162	595	102	155	40	3	17	72	9	89	.261	.424
Brandon Lowe	150	584	94	152	29	1	35	96	2	62	.260	.493
Nick Gonzales	148	551	72	167	27	1	6	61	7	43	.303	.388
Jake Mangum	133	435	56	120	19	2	5	33	23	25	.276	.363
Ryan O'Hearn	110	407	58	108	17	0	18	76	1	35	.265	.440
Spencer Horwitz	114	385	45	94	14	1	10	49	1	54	.244	.364
Oneil Cruz	97	368	65	103	14	1	20	67	30	47	.280	.486
Jared Triolo	125	324	34	77	12	0	3	29	13	28	.238	.302
Konnor Griffin	80	312	43	85	15	4	6	33	23	20	.272	.404
Henry Davis	97	256	33	44	6	0	10	38	3	28	.172	.313
Marcell Ozuna	70	251	22	51	7	0	8	29	0	27	.203	.327
Esmerlyn Valdez	72	241	40	56	14	1	17	47	0	42	.232	.510
Rafael Flores Jr.	47	148	17	39	6	0	11	25	0	15	.264	.527
Endy Rodríguez	45	135	20	36	6	0	7	20	6	23	.267	.467
Jacob Gonzalez	51	123	10	25	5	0	5	14	2	4	.203	.366
Nick Yorke	40	104	7	22	4	0	1	12	1	9	.212	.279
Tyler Callihan	37	95	13	20	4	2	3	15	1	9	.211	.389
Ronny Simon	21	63	11	16	3	0	1	4	4	4	.254	.349
Joey Bart	21	58	9	15	1	0	2	6	0	2	.259	.379
Billy Cook	87	56	13	10	2	1	0	3	6	1	.179	.250
Jhostynxon García	20	48	2	8	1	0	0	2	0	1	.167	.188
Shawn Ross	2	5	1	1	0	0	1	2	0	0	.200	.800
Davis Wendzel	2	4	0	0	0	0	0	0	0	0	.000	.000
Jack Brannigan	2	1	0	0	0	0	0	0	0	0	.000	.000
Totals	162	5549	767	1404	246	17	186	733	132	568	.253	.404

=== Pitching ===
Note: W = Wins; L = Losses; ERA = Earned run average; G = Games pitched; GS = Games started; SV = Saves; IP = Innings pitched; H = Hits allowed; R = Runs allowed; ER = Earned runs allowed; BB = Walks allowed; SO = Strikeouts

Player	W	L	ERA	G	GS	SV	IP	H	R	ER	BB	SO
Paul Skenes	10	11	3.82	32	32	0	174.1	146	82	74	49	200
Braxton Ashcraft	14	6	3.65	28	28	0	165.1	145	73	67	35	173
Bubba Chandler	8	10	4.62	31	30	0	154.0	136	89	79	80	140
Carmen Mlodzinski	8	7	3.95	37	12	2	123.0	125	62	54	44	97
Mitch Keller	6	8	5.29	22	22	0	115.2	117	73	68	42	89
Jared Jones	5	6	3.72	21	21	0	101.2	79	43	42	31	123
Yohan Ramírez	7	4	2.86	66	1	2	85.0	57	32	27	44	102
Mason Montgomery	6	4	2.88	70	5	18	68.2	45	23	22	26	105
Gregory Soto	6	5	3.63	69	0	16	67.0	49	31	27	29	79
Evan Sisk	1	0	3.02	41	0	0	44.2	36	15	15	25	50
Wilber Dotel	1	5	4.46	22	2	0	42.1	42	24	21	16	41
Dennis Santana	2	5	6.05	44	0	2	41.2	42	30	28	21	37
Isaac Mattson	0	0	5.35	38	0	0	38.2	44	23	23	18	36
Lake Bachar	1	2	2.57	15	8	0	28.0	18	8	8	15	32
Justin Lawrence	0	2	5.32	23	0	0	22.0	22	20	13	12	25
Khristian Curtis	2	0	4.71	6	0	0	21.0	15	11	11	12	13
Camilo Doval	0	1	3.79	20	0	0	19.0	19	9	8	14	23
Antwone Kelly	0	0	4.82	8	0	0	18.2	19	10	10	8	14
Hunter Barco	0	1	7.64	7	0	0	17.2	21	17	15	13	14
Brandon Eisert	1	2	4.86	15	0	0	16.2	17	9	9	6	17
Luke Weaver	2	0	4.96	18	0	0	16.1	17	9	9	5	20
Brandan Bidois	0	0	6.32	15	0	0	15.2	19	16	11	12	20
Kirby Yates	2	0	1.80	15	1	0	15.0	14	3	3	5	13
Cam Sanders	0	0	8.68	9	0	0	9.1	9	9	9	10	13
José Urquidy	0	1	8.53	5	0	1	6.1	15	10	6	2	6
Ron Marinaccio	0	0	6.75	4	0	0	5.1	5	4	4	2	4
Noah Murdock	0	0	0.00	3	0	0	3.1	3	0	0	3	4
Tyler Callihan	0	0	0.00	4	0	0	3.0	3	0	0	3	1
Hunter Stratton	0	0	7.71	2	0	0	2.1	5	2	2	0	2
Chris Devenski	0	0	7.71	3	0	0	2.1	5	2	2	0	3
Rafael Flores Jr.	0	0	0.00	1	0	0	1.0	2	0	0	0	0
Totals	82	80	4.15	162	162	41	1445.0	1291	739	667	582	1496

== Farm system ==
Level	Team	League	Manager
Triple-A	Indianapolis Indians	International League	Eric Patterson
Double-A	Altoona Curve	Eastern League	Andy Fox
High-A	Greensboro Grasshoppers	South Atlantic League	José Mosquera
Low-A	Bradenton Marauders	Florida State League	Gera Alvarez
Rookie	FCL Pirates	Florida Complex League	Jim Horner
Rookie	DSL Pirates Black	Dominican Summer League	Ken Matsuzaka
Rookie	DSL Pirates Gold	Dominican Summer League	Joel Fuentes
