= Rafael Flores Jr. =

American baseball player (born 2000)

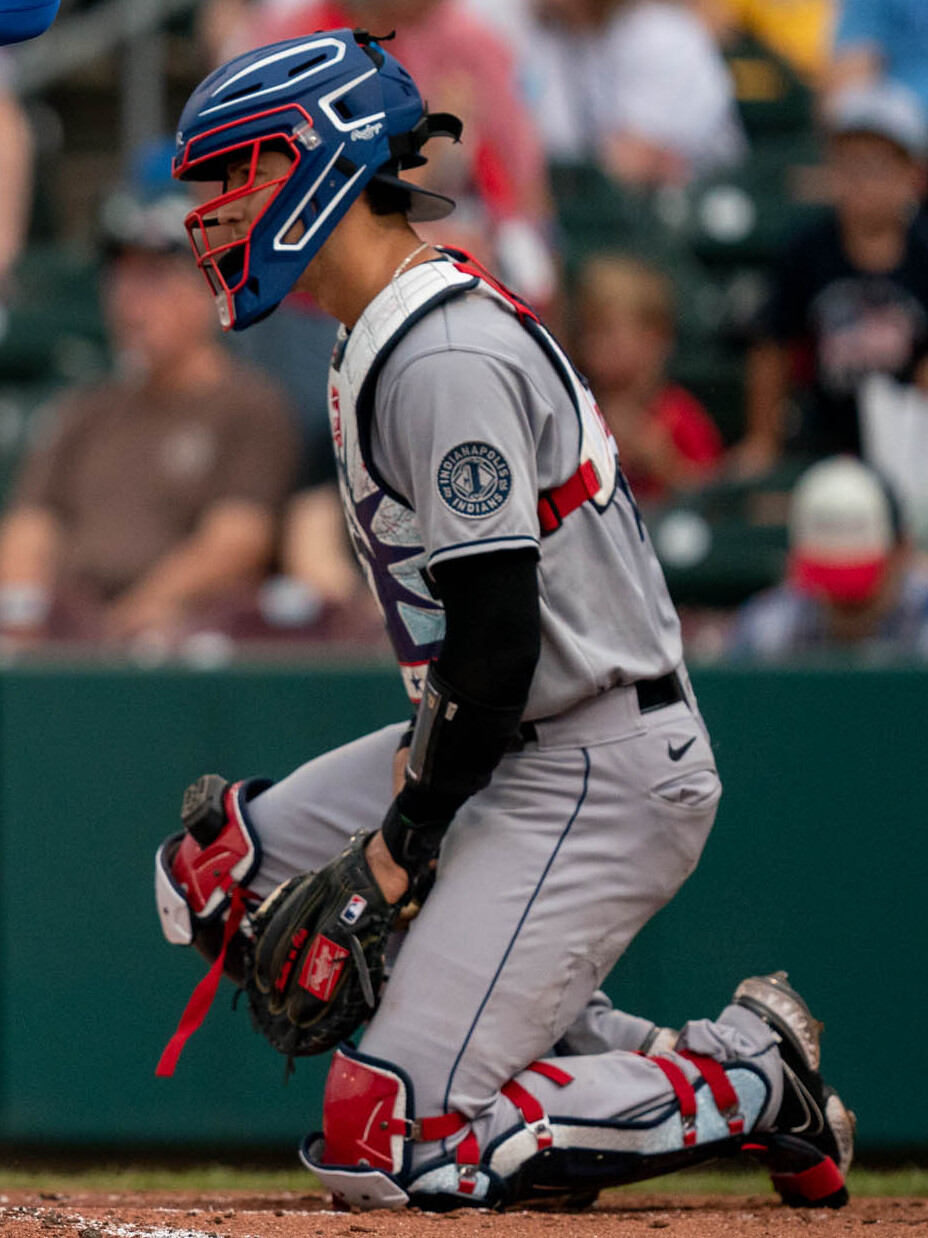
- Flores with the Indianapolis Indians in 2026

Pittsburgh Pirates – No. 43
- Catcher / First baseman
- Born: November 7, 2000 (age 25); Anaheim, California, U.S.
- Bats: Right Throws: Right

MLB debut
- September 17, 2025, for the Pittsburgh Pirates

MLB statistics (through 2026 season)
- Batting average: .258
- Home runs: 11
- Runs batted in: 25
- Stats at Baseball Reference

Teams
- Pittsburgh Pirates (2025–present)

Rafael Flores Jr. (born November 7, 2000) is an American professional baseball catcher for the Pittsburgh Pirates of Major League Baseball (MLB). He made his MLB debut in 2025.

== Career ==
=== New York Yankees ===
Flores attended Katella High School in Anaheim, California, and Rio Hondo College. He went unselected in the 2022 MLB draft. While he played collegiate summer baseball for the Alaska Goldpanners, the New York Yankees signed Flores to a professional contract in July 2022.

After signing, Flores appeared in four games for the FCL Yankees in the 2022 season. He played for the Hudson Valley Renegades in 2023 and for Hudson Valley and the Somerset Patriots in 2024. Baseball America named Flores the Yankees' Minor League Player of the Year for 2024.

=== Pittsburgh Pirates ===
On July 31, 2025, the Yankees traded Flores, Edgleen Perez, and Brian Sanchez to the Pittsburgh Pirates in exchange for David Bednar. In 36 appearances for the Triple-A Indianapolis Indians, he batted .281/.363/.459 with six home runs and 28 runs batted in (RBI). On September 16, Flores was selected to the 40-man roster and promoted to the major leagues for the first time. He made his major league debut the following day, recording his first hit. Flores made seven total appearances for Pittsburgh, going 3-for-15 (.200) with two walks.

Flores was optioned to Triple-A Indianapolis to begin the 2026 season, and was called up to the Pirates in June. On June 11, 2026, Flores hit his first career home run off of Los Angeles Dodgers starter Justin Wrobleski. On August 14, he hit a second-inning home run against the Boston Red Sox for his third home run in as many at bats, going back to the previous day's game against the Miami Marlins. On August 19, against the Detroit Tigers, Flores hit a pinch-hit home run in the seventh inning to cut the Tigers' lead to 3–2 and hit a home run in the ninth inning to tie the game, before Brandon Lowe hit a walk-off home run off the right-field foul pole. Flores became the first Pirates player since at least 1900 with multiple home runs in a game he did not start according to Aiden Stepansky of MLB.com. He played in a total of 47 games for the Pirates and batted .264 with 11 home runs and 25 RBI.
