= Jacob Melton =

American baseball player (born 2000)

Tampa Bay Rays – No. 29
- Outfielder
- Born: September 7, 2000 (age 26); Medford, Oregon, U.S.
- Bats: Left Throws: Left

MLB debut
- June 1, 2025, for the Houston Astros

MLB statistics (through 2025 season)
- Batting average: .157
- Home runs: 0
- Runs batted in: 7
- Stats at Baseball Reference

Teams
- Houston Astros (2025)

Jacob William Melton (born September 7, 2000) is an American professional baseball outfielder for the Tampa Bay Rays of Major League Baseball (MLB). He has previously played in MLB for the Houston Astros.

Melton played college baseball for the Oregon State Beavers and was drafted by the Astros in the second round of the 2022 MLB draft. He played in their minor league system and made his MLB debut with the Astros in 2025. Following the 2025 season, the Astros traded Melton to the Rays.

== Amateur career ==
Melton attended South Medford High School where he played baseball. In 2017, his junior season, he had a .453 batting average with nine home runs. As a senior in 2018, he batted .513 with eight home runs and 33 stolen bases. He went unselected in the 2018 Major League Baseball draft and enrolled at Linn-Benton Community College.

As a freshman at Linn-Benton in 2019, Melton had batted .365 with three home runs, 39 runs batted in (RBI), and 16 stolen bases over 39 games. That summer, he played in the Western Canadian Baseball League with the Okotoks Dawgs. He then transferred to Oregon State University to start the 2020 season. He appeared in seven games in which he batted .091 with six strikeouts over 11 at-bats before the season was cancelled due to the COVID-19 pandemic. Melton did not open the 2021 season in Oregon State's starting lineup, but eventually became their leadoff hitter, and appeared in 32 games (with 25 starts) before he injured his shoulder in late April, an injury which forced him to having season-ending shoulder surgery. Over those 32 games, he batted .404 with six home runs, 25 RBI, and eight stolen bases. He returned healthy in 2022 as Oregon State's starting center fielder. Over 63 games played during the season, Melton had a .360/.424/.671 slash line with 17 home runs, 83 RBI, 22 doubles, and 21 stolen bases. He was named the Pac-12 Conference Baseball Player of the Year.

== Professional career ==
=== Houston Astros ===
The Houston Astros selected Melton in the second round with the 64th overall selection of the 2022 Major League Baseball draft. He signed with the team for $1 million.

Melton made his professional debut with the Rookie-level Florida Complex League Astros and was promoted to the Single-A Fayetteville Woodpeckers after four games. Over 23 games between both affiliates, he batted .261 with four home runs and 13 RBI. To open the 2023 season, Melton was assigned to the High-A Asheville Tourists. In late August, Melton was promoted to the Double-A Corpus Christi Hooks. Over 99 games, he had a .245/.334/.467 slash line with 23 home runs, 55 RBI, and 46 stolen bases. Melton was assigned to Corpus Christi to open the 2024 season. In late July, he was promoted to the Triple-A Sugar Land Space Cowboys. Over 105 games between the two affiliates, Melton batted .253 with 15 home runs, 54 RBI, and thirty stolen bases.

Melton began the 2025 season with Sugar Land, playing in 17 games and hitting .254 with two home runs, seven RBI, and three stolen bases. On June 1, 2025, Melton was selected to the 40-man roster and promoted to the major leagues for the first time. He made his major league debut that day, starting in center field at Daikin Park, and went 1-for-3 versus the Tampa Bay Rays. He recorded an infield single versus Taj Bradley in the fifth inning for his first major league hit. Melton made 32 appearances for Houston during his rookie campaign, slashing .157/.234/.186 with seven RBI and seven stolen bases.

=== Tampa Bay Rays ===
On December 19, 2025, the Astros traded Melton to the Tampa Bay Rays in a three-team trade in which the Rays also acquired Anderson Brito, the Pittsburgh Pirates acquired Brandon Lowe, Jake Mangum, and Mason Montgomery, and the Astros acquired Mike Burrows.

Melton was optioned to the Triple-A Durham Bulls to begin the 2026 season. On April 25, 2026, Melton was ruled out for 4-to-6 weeks after being diagnosed with a Grade 2 left ankle sprain. He completed a rehab assignment with the Rookie-level Florida Complex League Rays and then returned to play with Durham in June. On August 4, Melton was placed on the injured list for a second time with a hamstring strain, and was later activated on August 25. After aggravating the injury, Melton was placed on the 60–day injured list on September 15, officially ending his season. He played in 45 games for Durham and batted .253 with seven home runs, 26 RBI, and 26 stolen bases.
