= Bubba Chandler =

American baseball player (born 2002)

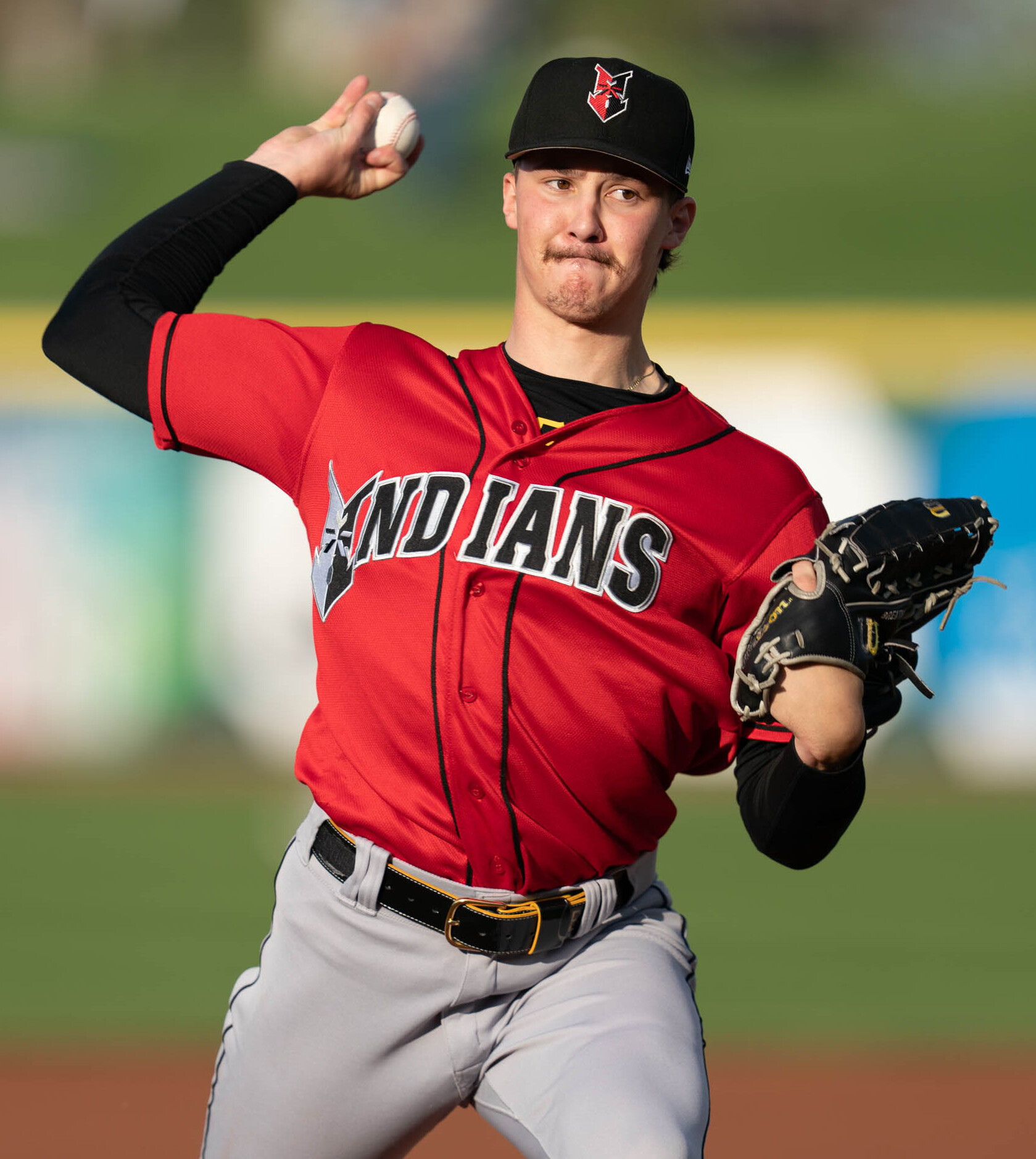
- Chandler with the Indianapolis Indians in 2025

Pittsburgh Pirates – No. 36
- Pitcher
- Born: September 14, 2002 (age 24); Lawrenceville, Georgia, U.S.
- Bats: Switch Throws: Right

MLB debut
- August 22, 2025, for the Pittsburgh Pirates

MLB statistics (through September 25, 2026)
- Win–loss record: 12–11
- Earned run average: 4.52
- Strikeouts: 171
- Stats at Baseball Reference

Teams
- Pittsburgh Pirates (2025–present)

Roy Reuben "Bubba" Chandler IV (born September 14, 2002) is an American professional baseball pitcher for the Pittsburgh Pirates of Major League Baseball (MLB). He made his MLB debut in 2025.

== Early life ==
Chandler was born on September 14, 2002, to parents Ruben and Bobbi. He was given the moniker "Bubba" as a baby by his older sisters.

== Amateur career ==
Chandler lived in Bogart, Georgia, and attended North Oconee High School, where he was a member of the baseball and football teams. He started on the varsity basketball team during his freshman and sophomore years and was also a member of the golf team before focusing on football and baseball. Chandler was initially only recruited by college baseball programs and committed to play at the University of Georgia going into his junior year of high school after posting a 7–0 record with 55 strikeouts in 41 1/3 innings as a pitcher and batting .356 with 14 doubles and 25 RBI the previous season.

During his junior football season, Chandler completed 167 of 220 passing attempts for 2,098 yards and 27 touchdowns while also rushing for 505 yards and four touchdowns. In baseball, he batted .435 with two home runs, five doubles and 16 RBI and struck out 16 batters in seven innings pitched before the season was cut short due to the coronavirus pandemic. Later in the year, Chandler decommitted from Georgia and then committed to play both college football and baseball at Clemson. During the summer, he gained 35 pounds and developed a slider after studying then-Vanderbilt pitcher Kumar Rocker. As a senior, Chandler was named the Region 8 4A Offensive Player of the Year after passing for 1,842 yards and 18 touchdowns while also rushing for 548 yards and six touchdowns. During his senior baseball season, he also established himself as one of the best two-way prospects in the 2021 Major League Baseball draft. Chandler finished his senior baseball season with an 8–1 record and a 1.25 earned run average (ERA) with 96 strikeouts over 44 2/3 innings pitched and also batted .411 with 12 doubles, eight home runs, 35 RBIs, and 41 runs scored.

== Professional career ==
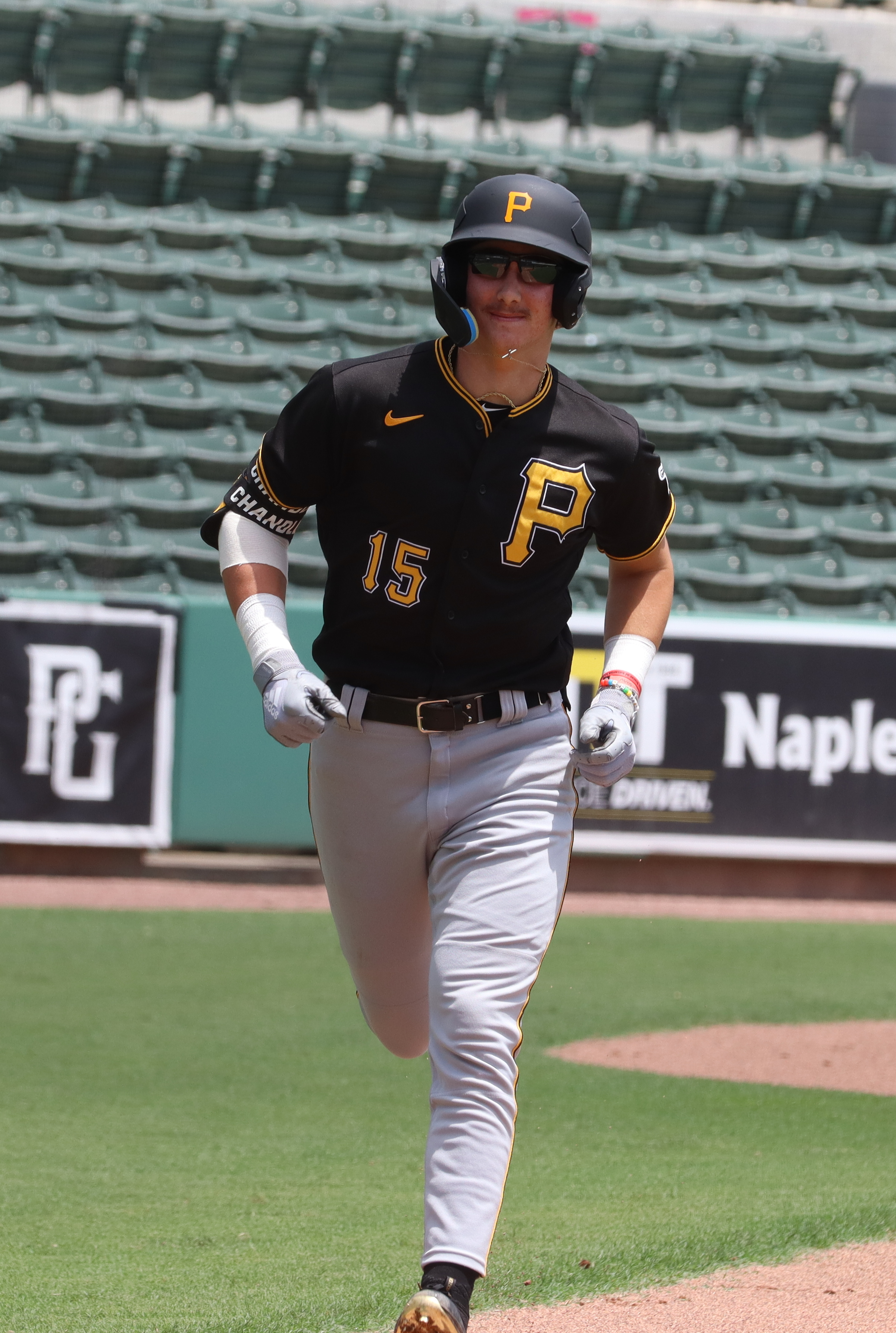
Chandler with the FCL Pirates in 2022

The Pittsburgh Pirates selected Chandler in the third round, with the 72nd overall pick, in the 2021 Major League Baseball draft. He signed with Pittsburgh on July 21, 2021, for an over slot signing bonus of $3 million. After signing with the team, Chandler was assigned to the Rookie-level Florida Complex League Pirates, where he played in 11 games as a shortstop and designated hitter and batted .167.

Chandler returned to the FCL Pirates after beginning the 2022 season in extended spring training. He was promoted to the Bradenton Marauders of the Single-A Florida State League. Chandler decided to give up playing shortstop and focus solely on pitching entering the 2023 season.

Chandler was called up by the Pirates and made his debut in the sixth inning on August 22, 2025, against the Colorado Rockies. Chandler recorded a save, becoming the first Pirates pitcher to record a save in his MLB debut. On August 27, Chandler pitched four scoreless innings of relief against the St. Louis Cardinals following a Carmen Mlodzinski start; he allowed one hit and struck out three en route to his first career win.

The Pirates carried Chandler on their Opening Day roster for the 2026 season.
