= Konnor Griffin =

American baseball player (born 2006)

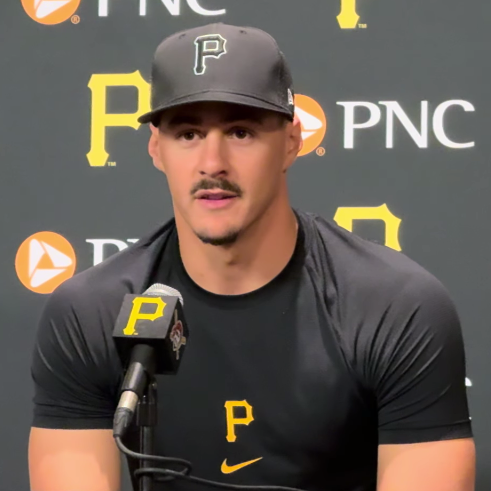
- Griffin with the Pittsburgh Pirates in 2026

Pittsburgh Pirates – No. 6
- Shortstop
- Born: April 24, 2006 (age 20); Jackson, Mississippi, U.S.
- Bats: Right Throws: Right

MLB debut
- April 3, 2026, for the Pittsburgh Pirates

MLB statistics (through 2026 season)
- Batting average: .272
- Home runs: 6
- Runs batted in: 33
- Stats at Baseball Reference

Teams
- Pittsburgh Pirates (2026–present)

Konnor Thomas Griffin (born April 24, 2006) is an American professional baseball shortstop for the Pittsburgh Pirates of Major League Baseball (MLB). He was selected with the ninth overall pick in the 2024 MLB draft by the Pirates and made his MLB debut in 2026.

== Amateur career ==
Griffin attended Jackson Preparatory School in Flowood, Mississippi, playing for their baseball team as an outfielder and pitcher. In 2023, Griffin batted .537 with eight home runs and 19 stolen bases and pitched to a 7–1 win–loss record with a 1.38 earned run average (ERA). In between his junior and senior year, he played in the High School All-American Game at T-Mobile Park. Griffin reclassified from the 2025 class to the 2024 class and committed to Louisiana State University (LSU) to play college baseball.

== Professional career ==
The Pittsburgh Pirates selected Griffin in the first round, with the ninth overall selection, of the 2024 Major League Baseball draft. On July 31, 2024, he signed with the Pirates on a $6.53 million contract, retracting his prior commitment to LSU.

Griffin made his professional debut in 2025 with the Bradenton Marauders. In June, he was promoted to the Greensboro Grasshoppers. He was selected to represent the Pirates (alongside Esmerlyn Valdez) at the 2025 All-Star Futures Game at Truist Park. In mid-August, Griffin was promoted to the Altoona Curve, with whom he ended his first professional season. Over 122 games among the three teams, Griffin hit .333 with 21 home runs, 94 runs batted in (RBIs), and 65 stolen bases. Baseball America named him their Minor League Player of the Year.

ESPN rated Griffin the No. 1 MLB prospect ahead of the 2026 season. The Pirates invited Griffin to spring training as a non-roster player and reassigned him to minor league camp on March 21, 2026. He opened the season with the Indianapolis Indians with whom he played in five games and had a .438 batting average with three doubles.

On April 3, 2026, the Pirates promoted Griffin to the major leagues for the first time. He made his MLB debut that day, also Pittsburgh's home opener, as the Pirates' starting shortstop versus the Baltimore Orioles. He recorded his first MLB hit, a RBI double, in his first at-bat. He became the first teenager to debut in MLB since Juan Soto in 2018 for the Washington Nationals, and the first Pirates teenager to debut since Aramis Ramírez in 1998. Only a week after his major league debut, the Pirates and Griffin agreed on a 9-year, $140 million contract extension. This was the largest guarantee in Pirates history as well as for any player in his rookie season. Griffin hit his first MLB home run on April 24 off of Milwaukee Brewers starting pitcher Brandon Woodruff. On May 31, he was placed on the injured list with a forearm strain. On June 24, Griffin began his rehab assignment with Double-A Altoona Curve. On June 26, Griffin was activated from the injured list and reassigned to the Pirates roster. In his first at-bat since returning from injury, Griffin hit a home run off Andrew Abbott in a 6–4 loss against the Cincinnati Reds. On July 7, Griffin was placed on the 10-day injured list with a torn sagittal band in his left ring finger, and was given a recovery timetable of 8–10 weeks. On September 4, Griffin was activated from the injured list.

== Personal life ==
Griffin married his high school sweetheart, Dendy Hogan, in January 2026.
