= Carmen Mlodzinski =

American baseball player (born 1999)

Pittsburgh Pirates – No. 50
- Pitcher
- Born: February 19, 1999 (age 27); Hilton Head Island, South Carolina, U.S.
- Bats: Right Throws: Right

MLB debut
- June 16, 2023, for the Pittsburgh Pirates

MLB statistics (through 2026 season)
- Win–loss record: 21–23
- Earned run average: 3.53
- Strikeouts: 266
- Stats at Baseball Reference

Teams
- Pittsburgh Pirates (2023–present)

Carmen Alexander Mlodzinski (/məˈdʒɪnski/ muh-JIN-ski; born February 19, 1999) is an American professional baseball pitcher for the Pittsburgh Pirates of Major League Baseball (MLB). He played college baseball at the University of South Carolina and was selected by the Pirates with the 31st pick of the 2020 Major League Baseball draft. He made his MLB debut in 2023.

== Amateur career ==
Mlodzinski attended and graduated from Hilton Head Island High School in Hilton Head Island, South Carolina. In 2017, his senior season, he was named the South Carolina 4A Player of the Year. After informing professional scouts that he would be honoring his college commitment to the University of South Carolina, he went undrafted in the 2017 Major League Baseball draft and thus enrolled at USC to play college baseball for the South Carolina Gamecocks.

In 2018, Mlodzinski's freshman year at USC, he pitched 45 2/3 innings, going 3–6 with a 5.52 ERA and 21 walks and 43 strikeouts over 19 games (seven starts). As a sophomore in 2019, he was the Gamecocks' opening day starter. However, during his third start of the year, he suffered a foot injury and missed the remainder of the 2019 season. That summer, he returned from the injury, playing for the Falmouth Commodores of the Cape Cod Baseball League and pitching to a 1.83 ERA and 43 strikeouts as opposed to five walks over 34 1/3 innings. Mlodzinski entered his redshirt sophomore season in 2020 as a top prospect for the 2020 Major League Baseball draft. He pitched to a 2.84 ERA over four starts before the college baseball season was cut short due to the COVID-19 pandemic.

== Professional career ==
=== Minor leagues ===
Mlodzinski was selected by the Pittsburgh Pirates with the 31st overall pick of the draft. He signed with the Pirates on July 2, 2020, for a $2.05 million bonus. He did not play a minor league game in 2020 due to the cancellation of the minor league season caused by the pandemic.

Mlodzinski made his professional debut in 2021 with the Greensboro Grasshoppers of the High-A East. He was placed on the injured list on July 12 with a shoulder injury, and was activated on August 14. He returned to the injured list once again on September 9, but was activated only one week later. Over 14 starts with Greensboro, Mlodzinski went 2–3 with a 3.93 ERA and 64 strikeouts over 50 1/3 innings. Following the end of Greensboro's season, he was promoted to the Indianapolis Indians of the Triple-A East, with whom he pitched two innings. He was selected to play in the Arizona Fall League for the Peoria Javelinas after the season. He was assigned to the Altoona Curve of the Double-A Eastern League for the 2022 season. In early May, he was placed on the injured list due to a shoulder injury but was activated a week later. Over 27 games (22 starts), he went 6–8 with a 4.78 ERA and 111 strikeouts over 105 1/3 innings. To open the 2023 season, Mlodzinski was assigned to the Indianapolis Indians of the Triple-A International League.

=== Major leagues ===
On June 16, 2023, Mlodzinski was selected to the 40-man roster and promoted to the major leagues for the first time after Rob Zastryzny was placed on the injured list. At the time of his promotion, he had pitched 19 games for Indianapolis and registered a 3.16 ERA with 31 strikeouts and one save in 25 2/3 innings pitched. Mlodzinski played the remainder of the season with the Pirates, but was placed on the injured list with elbow soreness, and made one rehab appearance with Indianapolis. Over 35 appearances for Pittsburgh, Mlodzinski went 3–3 with a 2.25 ERA and 34 strikeouts over 32 innings.

Mlodzinski opened the 2024 season on the injured list with right elbow inflammation. He was activated in April and optioned to Indianapolis. In May, the Pirates promoted him back to the major leagues. He was placed on the injured list on July 30 and activated on August 27. For the Pirates in 2024, Mlodzinski posted a 5–5 record and a 3.38 ERA with 46 strikeouts in 50 2/3 innings.

Mlodzinski opened the 2025 season as Pittsburgh's fifth starter. He posted a 1–4 record and 5.67 ERA over nine starts before he was optioned to Indianapolis on May 21. The Pirates recalled him to the major leagues on June 11 and moved him back into the bullpen. Mlodzinski made a total of 34 appearances (12 starts) for Pittsburgh during the 2025 season and went 5–8 with a 3.55 ERA and 89 strikeouts across 99 innings.

Mlodzinski was named the Pirates' fifth starter to open the 2026 season. On April 15, 2026 the Pirates used Mason Montgomery as an opener on Mlodzinski's scheduled start date, and Mlodzinski then pitched six scoreless innings in relief in a 2-0 win versus the Washington Nationals, becoming the first Pirates pitcher since Steve Cooke in 1992 to pitch at least six scoreless innings in relief. In late May, amidst the return of Jared Jones, the Pirates announced Mlodzinski would be permanently moved to the bullpen, and he was subsequently placed on the restricted list for one day to prepare both physically and mentally. He was activated from the restricted list on June 1, and made his first appearance afterwards on June 4 in which he pitched four innings in relief and gave up one run and struck out three batters, registering a save. Mlodzinski pitched in 37 games (12 starts) for the Pirates in 2026 and ended the season with an 8–7 record, a 3.95 ERA, and 97 strikeouts across 123 innings.
