= Jake Mangum =

American baseball player (born 1996)

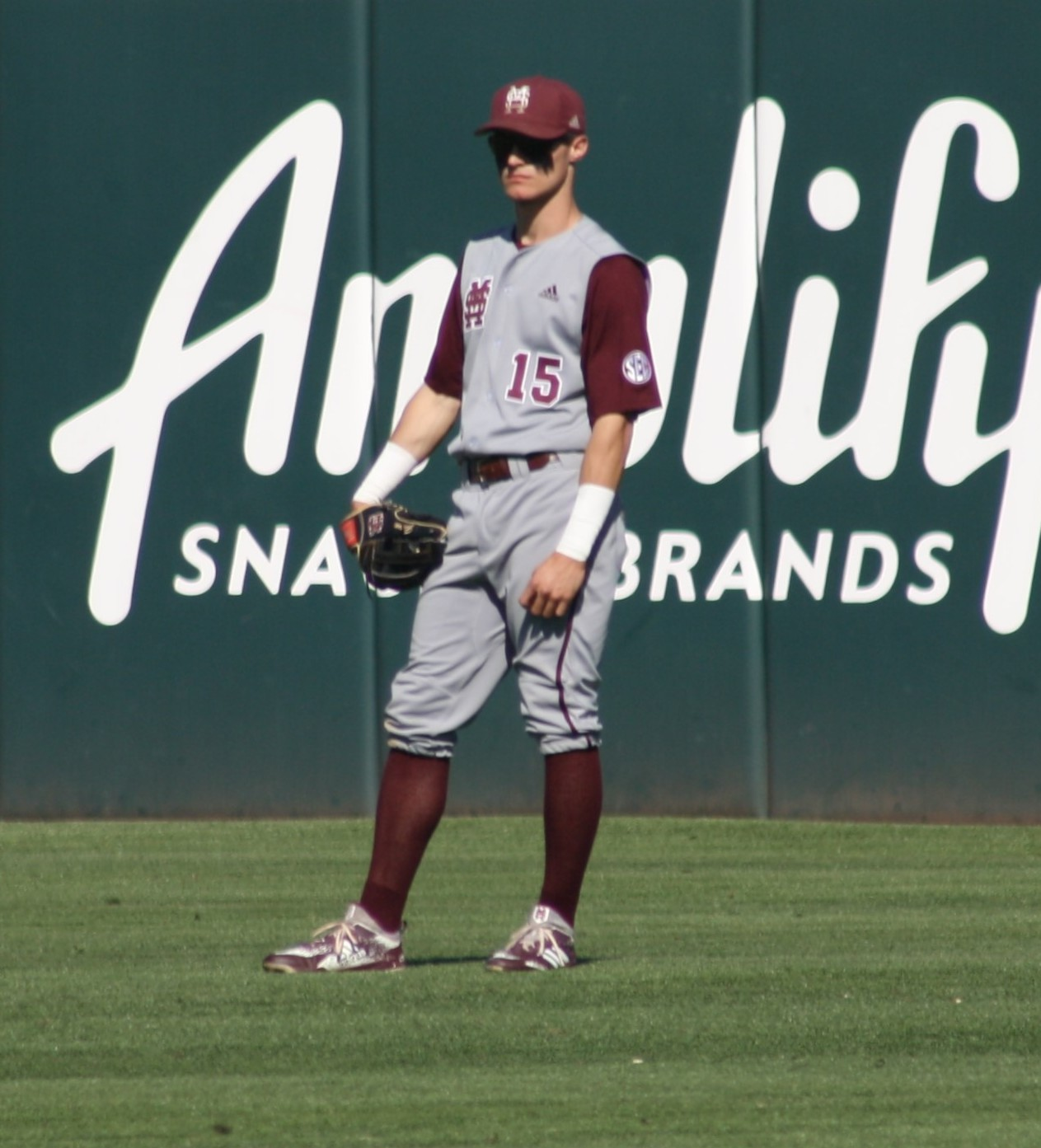
- Mangum playing for Mississippi State in 2019

Pittsburgh Pirates – No. 28
- Outfielder
- Born: March 8, 1996 (age 30); Flowood, Mississippi, U.S.
- Bats: Switch Throws: Left

MLB debut
- March 30, 2025, for the Tampa Bay Rays

MLB statistics (through 2026)
- Batting average: .286
- Home runs: 8
- Runs batted in: 73
- Stolen bases: 50
- Stats at Baseball Reference

Teams
- Tampa Bay Rays (2025); Pittsburgh Pirates (2026–present)

Jacob Thomas Mangum (born March 8, 1996) is an American professional baseball outfielder for the Pittsburgh Pirates of Major League Baseball (MLB). He has previously played in MLB for the Tampa Bay Rays. Mangum played college baseball for the Mississippi State Bulldogs.

== Early life ==
Mangum was born in Flowood, Mississippi, raised in nearby Pearl, Mississippi, and attended Jackson Preparatory School in Flowood. While playing for the Patriots Mangum was a member of three consecutive state championship teams in baseball and was named a Louisville Slugger All-American in 2013 and 2015 and Perfect Game All-American in 2013, 2014 and 2015 and Mississippi Association of Independent Schools (MAIS) first team All-State in 2014 and 2015. As a senior, Mangum was named the MIAS AAA, Division I Player of the Year after hitting .504 with 46 runs scored and 41 RBIs and compiling an 8-0 record with four saves, 66 strikeouts, and a 1.48 ERA in 52 innings pitched. Mangum originally committed to play college baseball at the University of Alabama, his father's alma mater, over offers from Ole Miss and Auburn. However, he ultimately de-committed from Alabama and instead chose to play for Mississippi State.

== College career ==
As a freshman in 2016, Mangum led the Southeastern Conference (SEC) and finished 7th in the NCAA with a .408 batting average along with 84 hits, one home run, 40 runs scored and 28 RBIs. He was named the SEC Freshman of the Year and first team All-SEC, as well as Freshman All-America by the National Collegiate Baseball Writers Association (NCBWA) and Baseball America. Mangum was also named second team All-America by the NCBWA, third team All-America by the American Baseball Coaches Association (ABCA), and was the first freshman to be awarded the C Spire Ferriss Trophy as the top collegiate baseball player in the State of Mississippi. During the summer of 2016, he played for the Bourne Braves of the Cape Cod Baseball League, batting .300 with nine RBIs and 11 stolen bases in 35 games and was named to the Cape Cod All-Star team.

As a sophomore, Mangum slashed .324/.380/.385 in 65 games with 90 hits, 51 runs scored, 26 RBIs and 14 stolen bases and was named second team All-SEC. In addition to playing in the outfield, Mangum also pitched for the Bulldogs and posted a 2-1 record with a 6.46 ERA in six appearances (five starts) and a save in his only relief appearance. Despite breaking his left hand sliding into third base in early April in a game against Kentucky, Mangum continued to play the rest of the season although he could not bat right-handed and his batting average fell dramatically. Mangum was selected in the 30th round (902nd overall) of the 2017 Major League Baseball draft by the New York Yankees following the season but opted to return to Mississippi State for his junior year. Following the 2017 season, he played a second summer in the Cape Cod League with the Hyannis Harbor Hawks and was named to the All-Star team for a second straight year.

In his junior season in 2018, Mangum led the SEC with 101 hits (5th in the NCAA) and 22 doubles (18th) in an NCAA-leading 288 at bats while hitting .351. He was named first-team All-SEC and to the SEC All-Defensive team and Rawlings Division I Gold Glove Team as the Bulldogs advanced to the 2018 College World Series, making it to the semifinals before losing to eventual champion Oregon State. He was selected with the 950th pick in the 32nd round of the 2018 MLB draft by the New York Mets but again decided to return to school, reportedly turning down a $300,000 signing bonus.

On April 26, 2019, Mangum passed Eddy Furniss as the all-time hits leaders in SEC history with his 353rd career hit. He set the MSU single season hit record with 108 in his final career game against Louisville in the College World Series. He was again named first team All-SEC and was awarded the Ferriss Trophy, becoming the first player to receive it twice. He was also named third team All-America by Collegiate Baseball Newspaper, becoming the second player in program history to be named an All-American in three different seasons after Rafael Palmeiro. Mangum finished his collegiate career with a school and conference record 383 hits (fourth in NCAA history) and at bats with 1,074, as well as school records for games played (262) and doubles (73) and finished second with 229 runs, third with 507 total bases, fourth with 56 stolen bases and tied for the 10th-highest career batting average at .357. Following the Bulldogs' loss to Louisville in the College World Series, Mangum appealed to the NCAA to allow programs to pay a third coach and to raise the scholarship limit beyond the current allowance of 11.7, revealing that he chose to give up his scholarship and play as a walk-on for his final two seasons so that Mississippi State could use the scholarship money elsewhere.

== Professional career ==
=== New York Mets ===
The Mets selected Mangum again in the fourth round (118th overall) of the 2019 MLB draft. Mangum signed with the Mets on June 24, 2019, for a signing bonus of $20,000, well below the slated bonus amount of $487,900 for his slot. He was assigned to the Brooklyn Cyclones of the Low-A New York–Penn League to begin his professional career. In his first professional season, Mangum batted .247 with 45 hits, 29 runs scored, 18 RBI and a team-leading 17 stolen bases in 53 games. He did not play in a game in 2020 due to the cancellation of the minor league season because of the COVID-19 pandemic.

Mangum returned to Brooklyn, now the Mets' High-A affiliate, to begin the 2021 season before being promoted to the Double-A Binghamton Rumble Ponies on May 22. Over 84 games between the two teams, he slashed .285/.337/.454 with nine home runs, 47 RBI, and 14 stolen bases.

Mangum was named to the Mets' 2022 spring training roster as a non-roster invitee. He was assigned to Binghamton at the start of the season. Mangum batted .283 in 31 games before he was promoted to the Triple-A Syracuse Mets. He suffered a stress reaction in his spine shortly after his promotion. Mangum returned on August 31, 2022, and slashed .333/.365/.471 with two home runs and seven stolen bases over 33 games with Syracuse.

=== Miami Marlins ===
On December 7, 2022, Mangum was traded to the Miami Marlins as the player to be named later for the trade that sent Elieser Hernández and Jeff Brigham to the Mets. He was assigned to the Jacksonville Jumbo Shrimp at the beginning of the 2023 season. Mangum batted .298 with five home runs and 52 RBI in 119 games with Jacksonville.

=== Tampa Bay Rays ===
On December 8, 2023, Mangum was traded to the Tampa Bay Rays as the player to be named later for the trade that sent Vidal Bruján and Calvin Faucher to the Marlins. In 104 games for Durham in 2024, he batted .317/.358/.442 with six home runs, 56 RBI, and 20 stolen bases. On November 19, 2024, the Rays placed Mangum on the 40-man roster, protecting him from the Rule 5 draft.

Mangum was optioned to Triple-A Durham to begin the 2025 season. On March 29, 2025, Mangum was promoted to the major leagues for the first time following an injury to Josh Lowe. On May 31, Mangum hit his first career home run, a two-run shot off of Kaleb Ort of the Houston Astros. He played in 118 games for Tampa Bay during his rookie campaign, hitting .296/.330/.368 with three home runs, 40 RBI, and 27 stolen bases.

=== Pittsburgh Pirates ===
On December 19, 2025, the Rays sent Mangum to the Pittsburgh Pirates in a three-team trade in which the Pirates also acquired Brandon Lowe and Mason Montgomery, the Astros acquired Mike Burrows, and the Rays acquired Jacob Melton and Anderson Brito.

== Personal life ==
Mangum is the son of former Alabama and Chicago Bears defensive back John Mangum Jr. and the nephew of former Carolina Panthers tight end Kris Mangum. His grandfather, John "Big John" Mangum Sr., played college football at Ole Miss and Southern Mississippi before playing for the Boston Patriots of the American Football League. Because of Mangum’s success at Mississippi State he was nicknamed the Mayor of Starkville.
