= Jack Brannigan =

American baseball player (born 2001)

Pittsburgh Pirates – No. 76
- Third baseman / Shortstop
- Born: March 11, 2001 (age 25); Chicago, Illinois, U.S.
- Bats: Right Throws: Right

MLB debut
- July 7, 2026, for the Pittsburgh Pirates

MLB statistics (through 2026 season)
- Batting average: .000
- Home runs: 0
- Runs batted in: 0
- Stats at Baseball Reference

Teams
- Pittsburgh Pirates (2026–present)

Jack Thomas Brannigan (born March 11, 2001) is an American professional baseball infielder for the Pittsburgh Pirates of Major League Baseball (MLB).

== Amateur career ==
Brannigan attended Marist High School in Chicago, Illinois and played college baseball at the University of Notre Dame. He was a two-way player at Notre Dame, appearing in games as an infielder and relief pitcher. In 2021, he played collegiate summer baseball with the Wareham Gatemen of the Cape Cod Baseball League.

== Professional career ==
Brannigan was drafted by the Pittsburgh Pirates in the third round of the 2022 Major League Baseball draft. He signed with the Pirates, and spent his first professional season with the Florida Complex League Pirates and Bradenton Marauders. Brannigan played 2023 with Bradenton and the Greensboro Grasshoppers. After the season, he played in the Arizona Fall League.

Brannigan made 59 appearances for the Double-A Altoona Curve in 2025, batting .225/.329/.358 with five home runs, 30 RBI, and nine stolen bases. On November 18, 2025, the Pirates added Brannigan to their 40-man roster to protect him from the Rule 5 draft.

Brannigan was optioned to the Triple-A Indianapolis Indians to begin the 2026 season. However, the majority of his time to begin the year was spent with Double-A Altoona, where he batted .235/.333/.522 with eight home runs and 18 RBI across 31 appearances. On June 25, 2026, Brannigan was promoted to the major leagues for the first time. He was optioned back to Double-A the next day without making an appearance. Brannigan was promoted to the major leagues again on July 7, 2026, and made his major league debut the same day when he pinch-hit for Bryan Reynolds. He was optioned back to Triple-A on July 11.
