= Brandan Bidois =

Australian baseball player (born 2001)

Miami Marlins
- Pitcher
- Born: 21 June 2001 (age 25); Brisbane, Australia
- Bats: Right Throws: Right

MLB debut
- 13 May, 2026, for the Pittsburgh Pirates

MLB statistics (through 2026 season)
- Win–loss record: 0–0
- Earned run average: 6.32
- Strikeouts: 20
- Stats at Baseball Reference

Teams
- Pittsburgh Pirates (2026)

Brandan Bidois (born 21 June 2001) is an Australian professional baseball pitcher for the Miami Marlins of Major League Baseball (MLB). He has previously played in MLB for the Pittsburgh Pirates.

== Career ==
=== Pittsburgh Pirates ===
Bidois signed with the Pittsburgh Pirates as an international free agent in 2019. In 2020, he played with the Brisbane Bandits of the Australian Baseball League. Bidois made his minor league debut in 2021 with the Florida Complex League Pirates. He missed the 2022 season due to injury but returned to play in 2023 with the Bradenton Marauders. In 2024, he played with the Greensboro Grasshoppers and also appeared in one game for the Indianapolis Indians.

Bidois was eligible for the 2024 Rule 5 draft but went unselected. Bidois was a non-roster invitee to 2025 spring training and was named to Pittsburgh's Spring Breakout roster. In 2025, he played with Bradenton, Greensboro, the Altoona Curve, and Indianapolis. During the season, he pitched 18 innings in a row without allowing a hit over 11 relief appearances. He finished the season with an 8–0 record, a 0.74 ERA, and 69 strikeouts over forty relief appearances between the four teams and was named the Pirates Minor League Reliever of the Year. On 18 November 2025, the Pirates added Bidois to their 40-man roster to protect him from the Rule 5 draft.

Bidois was optioned to Triple-A Indianapolis to begin the 2026 season. On 12 May 2026, Bidois was promoted to the major leagues for the first time. At the time of his promotion, he was 3-2 with a 7.20 ERA across 15 innings with Indianapolis. He made his MLB debut on 13 May at PNC Park against the Colorado Rockies, pitching one inning in relief and allowing one run. Bidois pitched in 15 games for the Pirates and posted a 6.32 ERA and 20 strikeouts over 15 2/3 innings.

=== Miami Marlins ===
On 3 August, 2026, Bidois, Hyun Seung Lee, and Brian Sanchez were traded to the Miami Marlins in exchange for Lake Bachar. The Marlins assigned him to the Jacksonville Jumbo Shrimp with whom he pitched in three games and gave up four runs in 2 1/3 innings.
