= Yohan Ramírez =

Dominican baseball player (born 1995)

Pittsburgh Pirates – No. 49
- Pitcher
- Born: May 6, 1995 (age 31); Villa Mella, Dominican Republic
- Bats: Right Throws: Right

MLB debut
- July 24, 2020, for the Seattle Mariners

MLB statistics (through September 24, 2026)
- Win–loss record: 16–16
- Earned run average: 4.19
- Strikeouts: 317
- Stats at Baseball Reference

Teams
- Seattle Mariners (2020–2022); Cleveland Guardians (2022); Pittsburgh Pirates (2022–2023); Chicago White Sox (2023); New York Mets (2024); Baltimore Orioles (2024); New York Mets (2024); Los Angeles Dodgers (2024); Boston Red Sox (2024); Pittsburgh Pirates (2025–present)

Yohan Manuel Ramírez (born May 6, 1995) is a Dominican professional baseball pitcher for the Pittsburgh Pirates of Major League Baseball (MLB). He has previously played in MLB for the Seattle Mariners, Cleveland Guardians, Chicago White Sox, New York Mets, Baltimore Orioles, Los Angeles Dodgers, and Boston Red Sox.

== Career ==
=== Houston Astros ===
Ramírez signed with the Houston Astros as an international free agent on June 15, 2016, for a $15,000 signing bonus. He split the 2016 season between the Dominican Summer League and the Gulf Coast League, going a combined 2–1 with a 2.37 ERA over 30 1/3 innings. He split the 2017 season between the Quad Cities River Bandits, Buies Creek Astros, and Corpus Christi Hooks, going a combined 4–5 with a 4.66 ERA over 75 1/3 innings.

Ramírez split the 2018 season between Quad Cities and Buies Creek, going a combined 6–8 with a 3.00 ERA over 78 innings and split the 2019 season between the Fayetteville Woodpeckers and Corpus Christi, going a combined 4–7 with a 3.99 ERA over 106 innings.

=== Seattle Mariners ===
On December 12, 2019, Ramírez was selected by the Seattle Mariners in the Rule 5 draft. He made his major league debut on July 24, 2020, against the Houston Astros, pitching one scoreless inning and collecting his first MLB strikeout against Martín Maldonado. He finished the season with a 2.61 ERA along with 26 strikeouts and 20 walks in 20 2/3 innings. In 2021, Ramírez made 25 appearances for Seattle, posting a 1–3 record and 3.90 ERA with 35 strikeouts in 27 2/3 innings pitched.

In 2022 with Seattle, Ramírez made seven appearances, struggling to a 7.56 ERA with 10 strikeouts in 8 1/3 innings pitched. On May 13, he was designated for assignment.

=== Cleveland Guardians ===
Ramírez was traded to the Cleveland Guardians on May 16, 2022, in exchange for cash considerations or a player to be named later. He appeared in 11 games for the Triple-A Columbus Clippers, allowing five earned runs in 10 1/3 innings and pitched two innings in the majors for the Guardians on June 24, allowing one run on three hits. He was designated for assignment on July 3.

=== Pittsburgh Pirates ===
Ramírez was traded to the Pittsburgh Pirates on July 8, 2022, in exchange for cash considerations. He made 22 appearances for Pittsburgh down the stretch, posting a 3–1 record and 3.67 ERA with 21 strikeouts in 27 innings of work. He was optioned to the Triple-A Indianapolis Indians to begin the 2023 season but was recalled by the Pirates on April 16, making his 2023 debut on April 19 against the Colorado Rockies. In 26 relief appearances, he logged a 3.67 ERA with 31 strikeouts in 34 1/3 innings pitched. On September 1, Ramírez was again designated for assignment.

=== Chicago White Sox ===
On September 5, 2023, Ramírez was claimed off waivers by the Chicago White Sox. In five games for Chicago, he struggled to a 9.00 ERA with four strikeouts across four innings pitched. Following the season, on December 13, he was designated for assignment by the White Sox.

=== New York Mets ===
On December 18, 2023, the White Sox traded Ramírez to the New York Mets in exchange for cash considerations. After struggling to an 11.81 ERA in three games for the Mets, he was designated for assignment on April 8, 2024.

=== Baltimore Orioles ===
On April 11, 2024, the Mets traded Ramírez to the Baltimore Orioles in exchange for cash considerations. In five appearances for Baltimore, he recorded a 6.00 ERA with six strikeouts across six innings pitched before he was designated for assignment on May 2.

=== New York Mets (second stint) ===
On May 6, 2024, Ramírez was claimed off waivers by the Mets. He was again designated for assignment on May 15 after posting a 7.56 ERA in two games.

=== Los Angeles Dodgers ===
On May 20, 2024, the Mets traded Ramírez to the Los Angeles Dodgers in exchange for cash considerations. On July 24, he gave up five earned runs without retiring a batter in the 8th inning of a close game against the San Francisco Giants. He was designated for assignment the following day. In 27 games for the Dodgers, Ramírez allowed 18 runs in 29 1/3 innings for a 5.52 ERA.

=== Boston Red Sox ===
On July 28, 2024, Ramírez was claimed off waivers by the Boston Red Sox. He pitched 1 1/3 innings for the Red Sox, allowing two earned runs before he was again designated for assignment on July 31. Ramírez cleared waivers and was sent outright to the Triple–A Worcester Red Sox on August 2. He elected free agency on October 1.

=== Pittsburgh Pirates (second stint) ===
On October 24, 2024, Ramírez signed a minor league contract with the Pittsburgh Pirates. On July 4, 2025, Ramírez triggered an opt-out clause in his contract and was released by Pittsburgh. He re-signed with the Pirates on a new minor league contract two days later, and was assigned to the Triple-A Indianapolis Indians. On July 11, the Pirates selected Ramírez's contract, adding him to their active roster.
