= Wilber Dotel =

Dominican baseball player (born 2002)

Pittsburgh Pirates – No. 66
- Pitcher
- Born: September 25, 2002 (age 24); Santo Domingo, Dominican Republic
- Bats: Right Throws: Right

MLB debut
- April 19, 2026, for the Pittsburgh Pirates

MLB statistics (through 2026 season)
- Win–loss record: 1–5
- Earned run average: 4.46
- Strikeouts: 41
- Stats at Baseball Reference

Teams
- Pittsburgh Pirates (2026–present)

Wilber Bladimir Dotel (born September 25, 2002) is a Dominican professional baseball pitcher for the Pittsburgh Pirates of Major League Baseball (MLB). He made his MLB debut in 2026.

== Career ==
Dotel signed with the Pittsburgh Pirates as an international free agent on October 13, 2020. He made his professional debut in 2021 with the rookie–level Florida Complex League Pirates, recording a 3.34 ERA across 11 games. Dotel split the 2022 season between the FCL Pirates and the Single–A Bradenton Marauders, posting a cumulative 2–2 record and 3.49 ERA with 38 strikeouts across 14 appearances (including nine starts).

Dotel returned to Bradenton for the 2023 campaign, where he logged a 7–2 record and 3.09 ERA with 58 strikeouts in 78 2/3 innings pitched across 18 games (15 starts). He spent the 2024 season with the High–A Greensboro Grasshoppers, compiling a 9–5 record and 5.33 ERA with 106 strikeouts across 25 starts.

Dotel made 27 appearances for the Double-A Altoona Curve in 2025, posting a 7–9 record and 4.15 ERA with 131 strikeouts across 125 2/3 innings pitched. On November 18, 2025, the Pirates added Dotel to their 40-man roster to protect him from the Rule 5 draft.

The Pirates optioned Dotel to the Triple-A Indianapolis Indians to begin the 2026 season. On April 19, 2026, Dotel was promoted to the major leagues for the first time. On May 25, Dotel recorded his first career win after tossing three scoreless innings of relief against the Chicago Cubs.
