= Braxton Ashcraft =

American baseball player (born 1999)

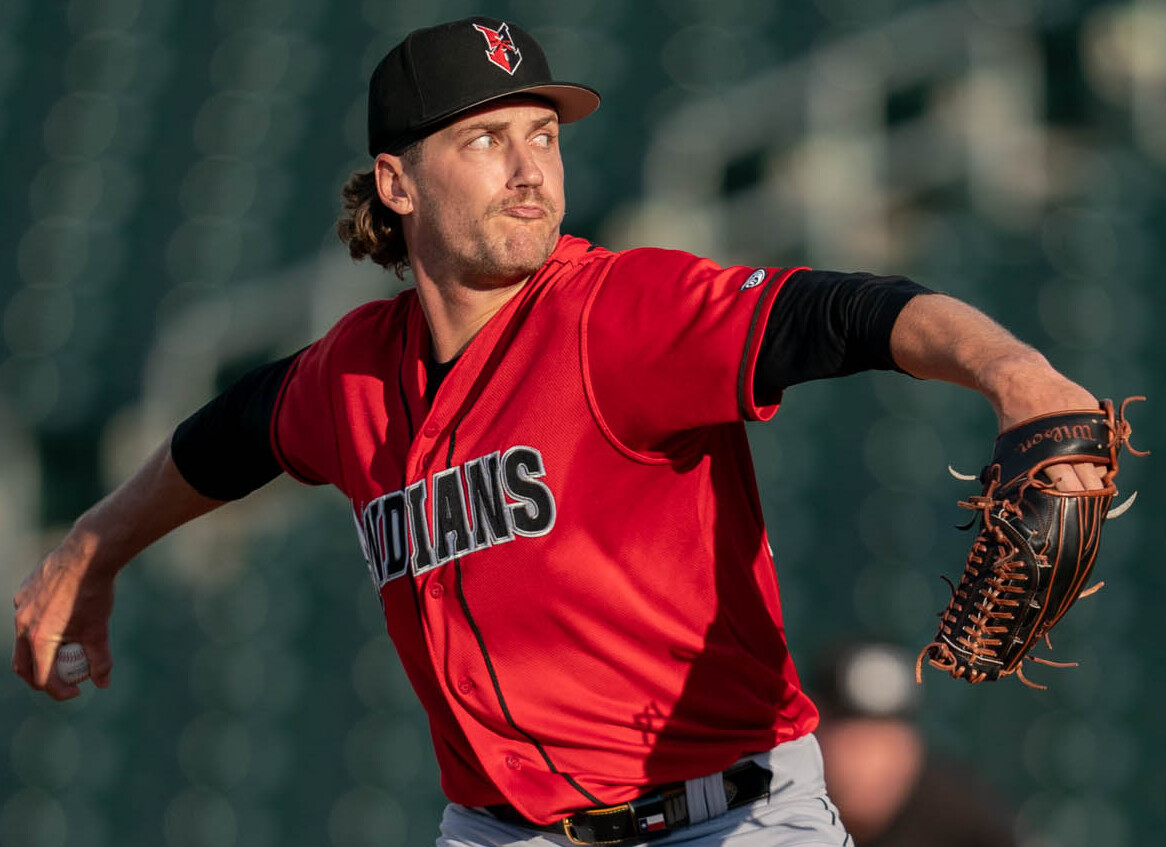
- Ashcraft with Indianapolis in 2025

Pittsburgh Pirates – No. 35
- Pitcher
- Born: October 5, 1999 (age 26); Waco, Texas, U.S.
- Bats: Left Throws: Right

MLB debut
- May 26, 2025, for the Pittsburgh Pirates

MLB statistics (through 2026 season)
- Win–loss record: 18–10
- Earned run average: 3.37
- Strikeouts: 244
- Stats at Baseball Reference

Teams
- Pittsburgh Pirates (2025–present)

Career highlights and awards
- All-Star (2026)

Braxton Ashcraft (born October 5, 1999) is an American professional baseball pitcher for the Pittsburgh Pirates of Major League Baseball (MLB). Ashcraft was named to his first All-Star game in 2026.

== Career ==
Ashcraft attended Robinson High School in Robinson, Texas. He was drafted by the Pittsburgh Pirates in the second round (51st overall) of the 2018 Major League Baseball draft. He signed and made his professional debut that summer with the rookie-level Gulf Coast League Pirates.

Ashcraft pitched in 2019 for the Low-A West Virginia Black Bears, logging a 1–9 record and 5.77 ERA with 39 strikeouts over 11 starts. He later underwent surgery on his left shoulder, which had been causing his non-throwing arm to become numb when he pitched. Ashcraft did not play in a game in 2020 due to the cancellation of the minor league season because of the COVID-19 pandemic. He also had surgery to repair a torn meniscus. He returned in 2021 to play for the High-A Greensboro Grasshoppers, making 10 starts before undergoing Tommy John surgery in August, which caused him to miss the 2022 season. Ashcraft returned from the injury in 2023 to play for the Single-A Bradenton Marauders, Greensboro, and the Double-A Altoona Curve; in 19 starts for the three affiliates, he posted a cumulative 0–3 record and 2.39 ERA with 63 strikeouts across 52 2/3 innings pitched.

On November 14, 2023, the Pirates added Ashcraft to their 40-man roster to protect him from the Rule 5 draft. He was optioned to the Triple-A Indianapolis Indians to begin the 2024 season. In 16 games (14 starts) split between Altoona and Indianapolis, Ashcraft compiled a 3–2 record and 2.84 earned run average (ERA) with 77 strikeouts across 73 innings of work.

The Pirates optioned Ashcraft to Triple-A Indianapolis to begin the 2025 season. In 10 games for Indianapolis, he compiled a 3–3 record and 5.03 ERA with 56 strikeouts across 48 1/3 innings pitched. On May 26, 2025, Ashcraft was promoted to the major leagues and made his major league debut that same day, pitching the final three innings in a loss to the Arizona Diamondbacks. Ashcraft struck out the first batter he faced, Tim Tawa, for his first major league strikeout. On June 8, he recorded his first career win after pitching 1 1/3 scoreless innings in a victory over the Philadelphia Phillies.

On July 7, 2026, Ashcraft was named to the 2026 All-Star Game roster, his first NL All-Star selection. On August 13, Ashcraft threw his first career MLB complete game against the Miami Marlins.

== Personal life ==
Ashcraft's parents are Karen and Tony, and he has three siblings. His father coached him in youth baseball from ages 9 to 13. He married Cassidy Green, who also grew up in Robinson, on December 6, 2025. The couple is currently expecting their first child, revealed to be a girl.

Ashcraft also ran track and played football and basketball in high school. He caught seven touchdown passes in a high school football game in 2017, one shy of a state record. He had over 2,000 yards receiving and 37 touchdowns for the season.
