= Khristian Curtis =

American baseball player (born 2002)

Pittsburgh Pirates – No. 64
- Pitcher
- Born: May 9, 2002 (age 24); Beaumont, Texas, U.S.
- Bats: Right Throws: Right

MLB debut
- July 18, 2026, for the Pittsburgh Pirates

MLB statistics (through 2026 season)
- Win–loss record: 2–0
- Earned run average: 4.71
- Strikeouts: 13
- Stats at Baseball Reference

Teams
- Pittsburgh Pirates (2026–present)

Khristian Steven Curtis (born May 9, 2002) is an American professional baseball pitcher for the Pittsburgh Pirates of Major League Baseball (MLB).

== Career ==
Curtis was born in Beaumont, Texas, and grew up in Port Neches, Texas, where he attended Port Neches–Groves High School.

Curtis began his collegiate baseball career at Texas A&M University, appearing in five games during the 2022 season before sustaining a season-ending injury. He finished the season with a 2–0 record, a 1.42 earned run average (ERA), and 15 strikeouts over 19 innings pitched.

Curtis transferred to Arizona State University for the 2023 season. Pitching for the Sun Devils, he made 14 starts and recorded a 4–3 record with a 7.03 ERA across 64 innings.

Curtis was ranked among draft-eligible pitchers for the 2023 Major League Baseball draft, listed as the 126th-best prospect by Baseball America and 197th by MLB Pipeline.

Curtis was selected by the Pittsburgh Pirates in the 12th round (347th overall) of the 2023 Major League Baseball draft. He signed with the organization shortly after the draft.

After signing, Curtis began his professional career in the Pirates’ minor league system. He later pitched for the Bradenton Marauders before being assigned to the High-A Greensboro Grasshoppers during the 2025 season.

On July 5, 2025, Curtis was part of a combined nine-inning perfect game against the Aberdeen IronBirds while pitching for Greensboro. Curtis started the game and retired all 18 batters he faced, striking out ten, in six perfect innings. Two relievers completed the game, marking one of the rare perfect games in Minor League Baseball history.

Later in the 2025 season, Curtis was promoted to the Double-A Altoona Curve. He was later ranked as the No. 24 prospect in the Pittsburgh Pirates organization by MLB Pipeline.

Curtis began the 2026 campaign with Altoona before being promoted to the Triple-A Indianapolis Indians, for whom he recorded a 5.57 ERA with 30 strikeouts over six games. On July 18, 2026, Curtis was selected to the 40-man roster and promoted to the major leagues for the first time.
