= Lake Bachar =

American baseball player (born 1995)

Pittsburgh Pirates – No. 71
- Pitcher
- Born: June 3, 1995 (age 31); Winfield, Illinois, U.S.
- Bats: Right Throws: Right

MLB debut
- September 8, 2024, for the Miami Marlins

MLB statistics (through 2026 season)
- Win–loss record: 10–7
- Earned run average: 3.66
- Strikeouts: 179
- Stats at Baseball Reference

Teams
- Miami Marlins (2024–2026); Pittsburgh Pirates (2026–present)

Lake David Bachar (/ˈbɑːkər/ BAH-kər; born June 3, 1995) is an American professional baseball pitcher for the Pittsburgh Pirates of Major League Baseball (MLB). He has previously played in MLB for the Miami Marlins.

== Amateur career ==
Bachar attended Wheaton North High School in Wheaton, Illinois, where he played baseball and football. After graduating high school in 2013, he enrolled at the University of Wisconsin-Whitewater and joined the football team.

After his freshman year at UW-Whitewater, Bachar joined the baseball team in addition to still playing football. In 2015, his sophomore year and first as a member on the baseball team, he appeared in ten games (making seven starts) in which he went 7–1 with a 2.24 ERA and 46 strikeouts. That summer, he played in the Northwoods League for the Lakeshore Chinooks. As a junior in 2016, he went 8–6 with a 2.53 ERA over 92 2/3 innings. Following the season, he was selected by the San Diego Padres in the fifth round of the 2016 Major League Baseball draft. He signed for $350,000.

== Professional career ==
=== San Diego Padres ===
After signing, Bachar made his professional debut with the rookie-level Arizona League Padres before earning promotions to the Fort Wayne TinCaps of the Single–A Midwest League and the Lake Elsinore Storm of the High–A California League. Over 15 games between the three clubs, he went 2–2 with a 3.19 ERA. In 2017, he began the year back in the Arizona League before being promoted back to Fort Wayne. Over 13 games (seven starts), he pitched to a 5–1 record, a 3.38 ERA, and 47 strikeouts over 50 2/3 innings. Bachar began the 2018 season with Lake Elsinore and was promoted to the San Antonio Missions of the Double–A Texas League in May. He went 5–9 with a 4.68 ERA over 27 games (18 starts), pitching a total of 115 1/3 innings between the two teams. In 2019, he appeared in 24 games (19 starts) for the Amarillo Sod Poodles of the Double–A Texas League, going 8–4 with a 3.98 ERA and 126 strikeouts over 126 2/3 innings.

Bachar did not play in a game in 2020 due to the cancellation of the season because of the COVID-19 pandemic. He additionally missed the whole 2021 season after undergoing Tommy John surgery. He played the 2022 season with San Antonio. Over 27 games (seven starts), he went 5–3 with a 6.15 ERA, 44 strikeouts, and 18 walks over 45 1/3 innings. In 2023, Bachar spent his second straight season with Double–A San Antonio, making 42 appearances and registering a 2.69 ERA with 69 strikeouts and 5 saves across 60 1/3 innings pitched. He elected free agency following the season on November 6, 2023.

On January 12, 2024, Bachar re–signed with the Padres organization on a minor league contract. On August 2, Bachar triggered an opt–out clause in his contract; the Padres subsequently added him to the 40-man roster to prevent him from electing free agency. In 44 games for the Triple–A El Paso Chihuahuas, he posted a 5–3 record and 4.12 ERA with 81 strikeouts across 67 2/3 innings pitched. On August 25, Bachar was promoted to the major leagues for the first time. However, he went unused out of the bullpen and was optioned to Triple–A the next day, becoming a phantom ballplayer. Bachar was designated for assignment by the Padres on September 1.

=== Miami Marlins ===
On September 3, 2024, Bachar was claimed off waivers by the Miami Marlins. He was promoted to the major leagues on September 7. Bachar made his MLB debut on September 8, striking out the side in the eighth inning of Miami's 10–1 win over the Philadelphia Phillies. He was the 69th unique player to appear for the Marlins in 2024, tying the 2021 Chicago Cubs for the most players used in one season in MLB history. Bachar made ten appearances in relief for the Marlins and went 0–1 with a 3.86 ERA.

Bachar was named to Miami's 2025 Opening Day roster. On April 22, 2025, he recorded his first career win after tossing a scoreless seventh inning against the Cincinnati Reds. He was optioned to the Triple-A Jacksonville Jumbo Shrimp on May 24 and recalled to Miami on June 10. Bachar pitched in 53 games for the Marlins and went 8–2 with a 3.93 ERA and 75 strikeouts across 71 innings.

Bachar made 38 appearances (including four starts) for Miami during the 2026 season, logging a 1–2 record and 3.84 ERA with 61 strikeouts and two saves across 58 2/3 innings pitched.

=== Pittsburgh Pirates ===
On August 3, 2026, Bachar was traded to the Pittsburgh Pirates in exchange for Brandan Bidois, Hyun Seung Lee, and Brian Sanchez. He pitched in 15 games (eight starts) with the Pirates and had a 1–2 record, a 2.57 ERA and 32 strikeouts across 28 innings.
