= Mike Burrows (baseball) =

American baseball player (born 1999)

Houston Astros – No. 50
- Pitcher
- Born: November 8, 1999 (age 26); Waterford, Connecticut, U.S.
- Bats: Right Throws: Right

MLB debut
- September 28, 2024, for the Pittsburgh Pirates

MLB statistics (through 2026 season)
- Win–loss record: 7–13
- Earned run average: 4.92
- Strikeouts: 174
- Stats at Baseball Reference

Teams
- Pittsburgh Pirates (2024–2025); Houston Astros (2026–present)

Michael Thomas Burrows (born November 8, 1999) is an American professional baseball pitcher for the Houston Astros of Major League Baseball (MLB). He has previously played in MLB for the Pittsburgh Pirates. He made his MLB debut in 2024.

== Amateur career ==
Burrows attended Waterford High School in Waterford, Connecticut. As a senior in 2018, he went 6–0 with a 0.38 ERA and 98 strikeouts over 44 innings. After the season, he was selected by the Pittsburgh Pirates in the 11th round of the 2018 Major League Baseball draft. He signed for $500,000, forgoing his commitment to play college baseball for the UConn Huskies baseball team.

== Professional career ==
=== Pittsburgh Pirates ===
Burrows made his professional debut with the Rookie-level Gulf Coast League Pirates, pitching 14 innings and not giving up an earned run. He played the 2019 season with the West Virginia Black Bears of the Low–A New York–Penn League with whom he started 11 games and went 2–3 with a 4.33 ERA over 43 2/3 innings. He did not play a minor league game in 2020 due to the cancellation of the minor league season caused by the COVID-19 pandemic. Burrows spent the 2021 season with the Greensboro Grasshoppers of the High-A East, although he missed time due to injury. Over 13 starts, he went 2–2 with a 2.20 ERA, 66 strikeouts, and twenty walks over 49 innings. After the season, he was selected to play in the Arizona Fall League with the Surprise Saguaros. He was assigned to the Altoona Curve of the Double-A Eastern League to begin the 2022 season. In mid-June, he was promoted to the Indianapolis Indians of the Triple-A International League. He was selected to represent the Pirates alongside Henry Davis at the 2022 All-Star Futures Game. Over 24 games (22 starts) between Altoona and Indianapolis, he went 5–6 with a 4.01 ERA and 111 strikeouts over 94 1/3 innings.

On November 15, 2022, the Pirates selected Burrow's contract and added him to the 40-man roster. Burrows was optioned to Triple-A Indianapolis to begin the 2023 season. He made two starts for the club before suffering an injury to his ulnar collateral ligament. On April 26, 2023, Burrows underwent Tommy John surgery, ending his season.

Burrows was optioned to Triple–A Indianapolis to begin the 2024 season. In 10 games (9 starts) for Indianapolis, he posted a 4.06 ERA with 45 strikeouts across 37 2/3 innings pitched. On September 28, 2024, Burrows was promoted to the major leagues for the first time. He made his debut that day against the New York Yankees, earning the victory after pitching 3 2/3 innings, in which he allowed 2 runs (1 earned) on 2 hits with 2 strikeouts.

Burrows was optioned to Triple-A Indianapolis to begin the 2025 season. He made 23 appearances (19 starts) for the Pirates during the year, registering a 2-4 record and 3.94 ERA with 97 strikeouts over 96 innings of work.

=== Houston Astros ===
On December 19, 2025, the Pirates sent Burrows to the Houston Astros in a three-team trade in which the Rays acquired Jacob Melton and Anderson Brito, and the Pittsburgh Pirates acquired Brandon Lowe, Jake Mangum, and Mason Montgomery. He made 18 appearances (17 starts) for the Astros, compiling a 4–9 record and 5.99 ERA with 75 strikeouts across 94 2/3 innings pitched. On July 13, 2026, Burrows was placed on the injured list due to right elbow neuritis. He was transferred to the 60–day injured list on September 6.
