= Antwone Kelly =

Aruban baseball player (born 2003)

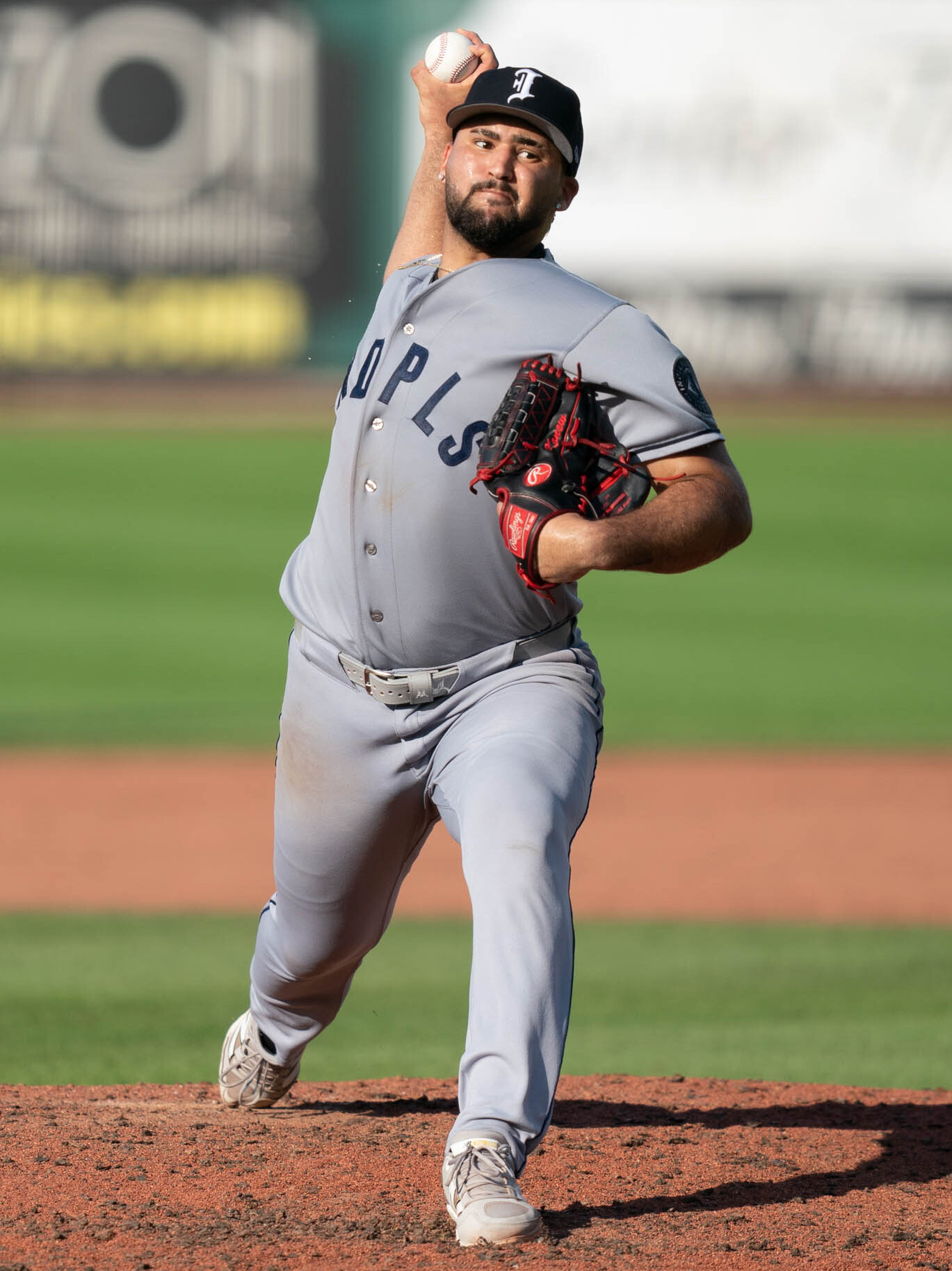
- Kelly with the Indianapolis Indians in 2026

Pittsburgh Pirates – No. 62
- Pitcher
- Born: September 1, 2003 (age 23); Oranjestad, Aruba
- Bats: Right Throws: Right

MLB debut
- June 12, 2026, for the Pittsburgh Pirates

MLB statistics (through 2026 season)
- Win–loss record: 0–0
- Earned run average: 4.82
- Strikeouts: 14
- Stats at Baseball Reference

Teams
- Pittsburgh Pirates (2026–present)

Antwone Thyshon Kelly (born September 1, 2003) is an Aruban professional baseball pitcher for the Pittsburgh Pirates of Major League Baseball (MLB). He made his MLB debut in 2026. Kelly has also pitched for the Netherlands national team in international competitions.

== Professional career ==
Kelly signed with the Pittsburgh Pirates as an international free agent on January 15, 2021. He made his professional debut that year with the Rookie League Dominican Summer League Pirates and played the 2022 season with the Rookie League Florida Complex League Pirates. Kelly opened the 2023 season in the Complex League before being promoted to the Single-A Bradenton Marauders near the season's end. In 2024, he spent the season with Bradenton and went 1–6 with a 4.43 ERA and 65 strikeouts over 69 innings.

Kelly opened the 2025 season with the High-A Greensboro Grasshoppers and was promoted to the Double-A Altoona Curve in June. Over 25 starts between the two teams, he went 3–3 with a 3.02 ERA and 116 strikeouts. On November 18, the Pirates added Kelly to their 40-man roster to protect him from the Rule 5 draft.

Kelly began the 2026 season with the Triple-A Indianapolis Indians. He was named the team's player of the month for May. On June 12, the Pirates promoted him to the major leagues for the first time. Across 13 games (ten starts) with the Indians at the time of his promotion, he had a 3–4 record, a 4.50 ERA and 47 strikeouts over 54 innings. Kelly made his MLB debut that night in relief against the Miami Marlins and pitched 2 1/3 innings in which he gave up two runs on two hits while recording his first MLB strikeout against Jakob Marsee. He became the fourth Aruban-born pitcher in MLB. Kelly was optioned back to Indianapolis the next day. He continued to be recalled and optioned throughout the season. With the Pirates, Kelly ended the season with a 4.82 ERA and 14 strikeouts over 18 2/3 innings. With Indianapolis, he pitched in 23 games and had a 5–6 with a 4.24 ERA and 71 strikeouts over 91 1/3 innings.

== International career ==
Kelly debuted for the Netherlands in the 2023 World Baseball Classic (WBC), pitching one scoreless inning. He was the ace for the Netherlands in the 2026 WBC. He took the loss against Venezuela, allowing two runs in three innings. His younger brother Jaitone also pitched for the Dutch in 2026.
