= Jared Jones =

American baseball player (born 2001)

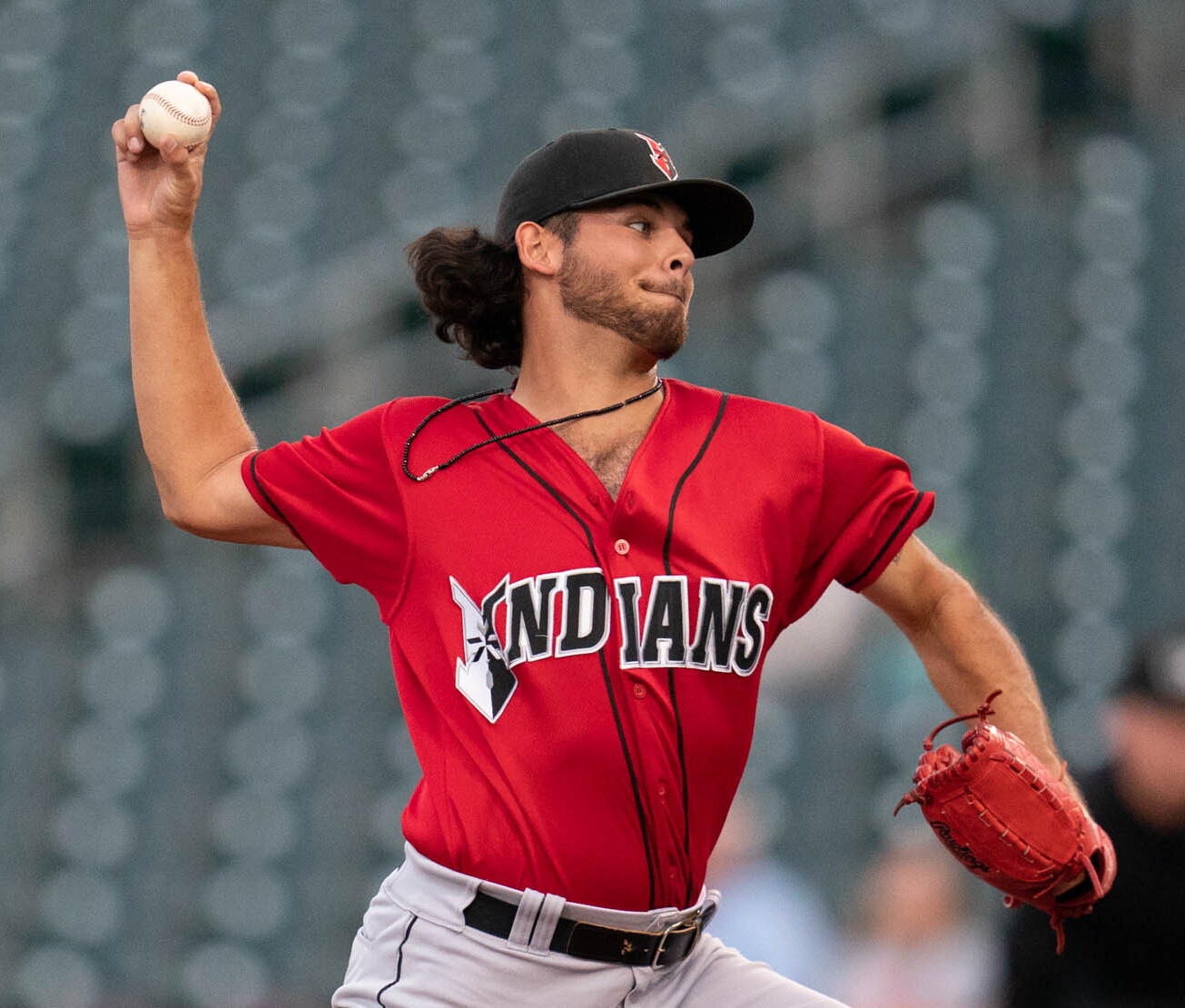
- Jones with Indianapolis in 2023

Pittsburgh Pirates – No. 17
- Pitcher
- Born: August 6, 2001 (age 25); Whittier, California, U.S.
- Bats: Left Throws: Right

MLB debut
- March 30, 2024, for the Pittsburgh Pirates

MLB statistics (through 2026 season)
- Win–loss record: 11–14
- Earned run average: 4.02
- Strikeouts: 250
- Stats at Baseball Reference

Teams
- Pittsburgh Pirates (2024, 2026–present)
Medals
Men's baseball
Representing United States
U-15 Baseball World Cup
Bronze medal – third place	2016 Iwaki	Team

Jared Keith Jones (born August 6, 2001) is an American professional baseball pitcher for the Pittsburgh Pirates of Major League Baseball (MLB). He made his MLB debut in 2024.

== Amateur career ==
Jones attended La Mirada High School in La Mirada, California. As a junior in 2019, he had a 7-0 record with a 0.77 ERA alongside a .468 batting average and three home runs, and was named the Los Angeles Times Baseball Player of the Year.

== Professional career ==
Jones was drafted by the Pittsburgh Pirates in the second round of the 2020 Major League Baseball draft, and signed with the Pirates rather than play college baseball for the Texas Longhorns.

Jones made his professional debut in 2021 with the Bradenton Marauders. Over 18 games (15 starts), he went 3–6 with a 4.64 earned run average (ERA) and 103 strikeouts over 66 innings pitched. He spent the 2022 season with the High-A Greensboro Grasshoppers, making 26 starts and compiling a 5–7 record and 4.62 ERA with 142 strikeouts across 122 2/3 innings pitched.

Jones split the 2023 season between the Double-A Altoona Curve and Triple-A Indianapolis Indians. In 26 games (25 starts) for the two affiliates, he accumulated a 5–9 record and 3.85 ERA with 146 strikeouts across 126 1/3 innings of work. For the 2023 season, Jones was named a MiLB.com Pirates Organization All-Star.

On March 25, 2024, the Pirates announced that Jones had made their Opening Day roster. He formally had his contract selected on March 28. Jones had a solid first half of the 2024 season, posting a 3.56 ERA and 98 strikeouts in 91 innings. Jones went on the 15-day injured list on July 5 with a lat strain, coming back to the Pirates on August 27. He was less effective in his return, with a 5.87 ERA in six starts in August and September.

On March 19, 2025, it was reported that Jones would miss his final scheduled spring training start due to elbow discomfort. By March 25, it was announced that he would be sidelined for at least the first few weeks of the season after being prescribed a six-week period of rest from throwing. On May 21, it was announced that Jones had undergone season-ending surgery to repair his ulnar collateral ligament, and would miss 10 to 12 months.

Jones was placed on the 60-day injured list to begin the 2026 season. He was activated for his season debut on May 29, 2026. On July 8, Jones pitched six perfect innings against the Atlanta Braves before being removed in consideration of his pitch count and injury recovery status. The Braves reached base against reliever Mason Montgomery in the seventh and eventually won the game 3-0.

Achievements
Preceded by Jesús Luzardo	National League Pitcher of the Month; September 2026	Most recent
