= Brandon Lowe =

American baseball player (born 1994)

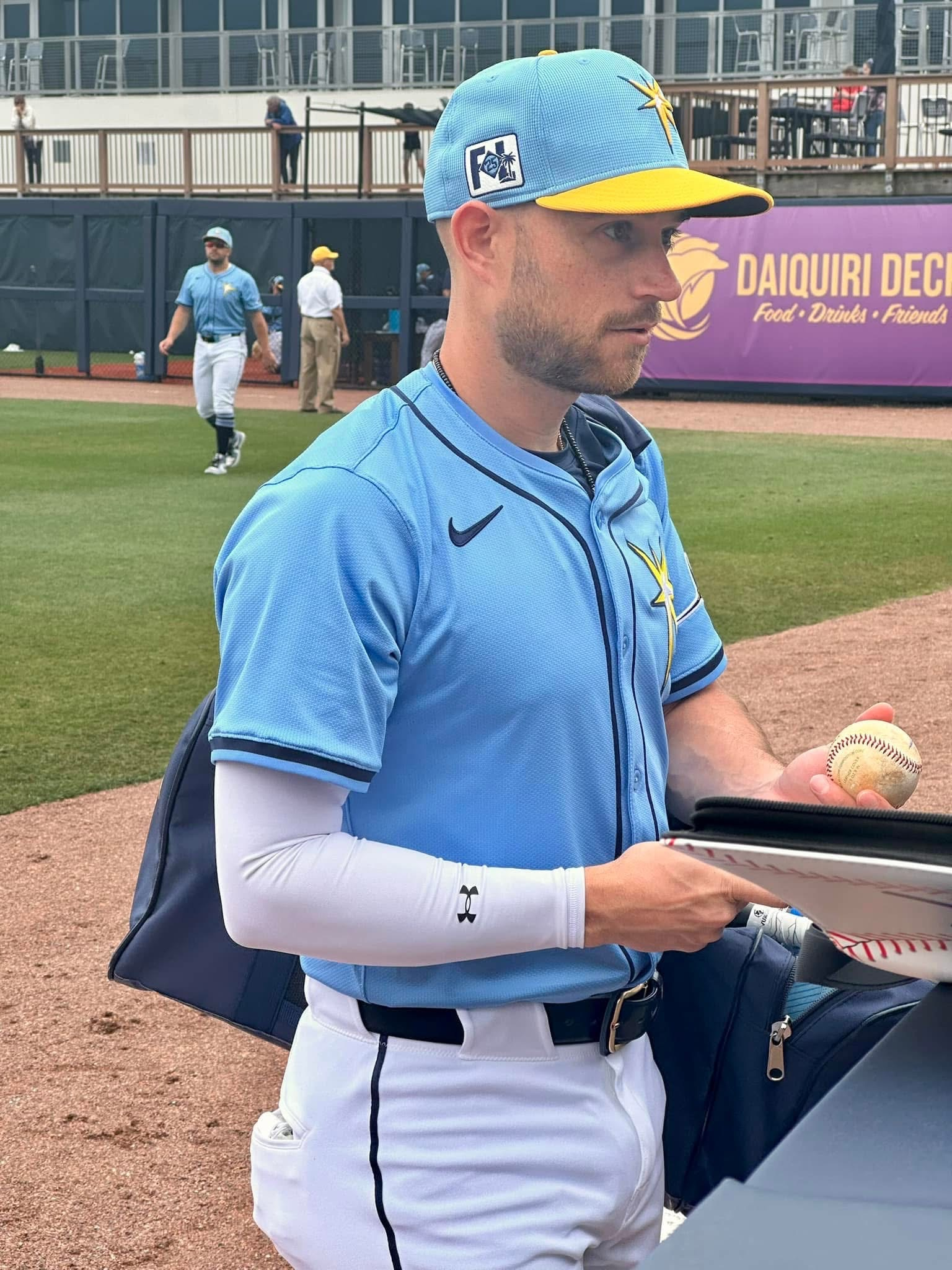
- Lowe with the Tampa Bay Rays in 2025

Free agent
- Second baseman
- Born: July 6, 1994 (age 32); Newport News, Virginia, U.S.
- Bats: Left Throws: Right

MLB debut
- August 5, 2018, for the Tampa Bay Rays

MLB statistics (through 2026 season)
- Batting average: .250
- Home runs: 192
- Runs batted in: 542
- Stats at Baseball Reference

Teams
- Tampa Bay Rays (2018–2025); Pittsburgh Pirates (2026)

Career highlights and awards
- 2× All-Star (2019, 2025); Silver Slugger Award (2026)

Brandon Norman Lowe (/laʊ/ LAU; born July 6, 1994) is an American professional baseball second baseman who is a free agent. He has played in Major League Baseball (MLB) for the Tampa Bay Rays and Pittsburgh Pirates. Lowe made his MLB debut in 2018 and has been named an MLB All-Star in 2019 and 2025.

== Amateur career ==
Lowe attended Nansemond River High School in Suffolk, Virginia, where he played on the school's baseball team. He led Nansemond to a district championship as a junior and a district title as a senior, he was also named first-team all-state, first-team all-region, and first-team all-district that year. He committed to University of Maryland, College Park to play college baseball for the Maryland Terrapins. Two days before the first game of his freshman year, Lowe tore the anterior cruciate ligament in his left knee, which caused him to be redshirted and miss the entire season. In his redshirt freshman season, Lowe was named third-team all-ACC after leading the Maryland Terrapins in batting average (.348), on-base percentage (.464) and slugging percentage (.464). In his sophomore season, Lowe led the Terrapins in hits, walks, runs, and doubles, as well as finishing second in runs batted in. In the summer of 2014, he played baseball with the Bethesda Big Train and became the MVP of the Cal Ripken Collegiate Baseball League. Two days before the 2015 Major League Baseball draft, Lowe suffered a broken fibula as the Terrapins lost to the Virginia Cavaliers in the NCAA super regional.

== Professional career ==
=== Tampa Bay Rays ===
==== Minor leagues ====
The Tampa Bay Rays selected Lowe in the third round, with the 87th overall selection, of the 2015 Major League Baseball draft. He recovered from his injury, debuting in 2016 with the Bowling Green Hot Rods. He finished the season batting .248, with five home runs and 42 RBI in 107 games.

Lowe started 2017 with the Charlotte Stone Crabs and was promoted to the Montgomery Biscuits during the season. With Charlotte he hit .311/.403/.524 with nine home runs and 46 RBI in 90 games and was named the MVP of the Florida State League. With the Montgomery Biscuits, he slashed .253/.270/.389 in 23 games. After the season, he played in the Arizona Fall League and was selected to play in the Fall Stars Game. Lowe began the 2018 season with the Biscuits and also played for the Durham Bulls of the Triple-A International League. Lowe was named to the 2018 MLB Pipeline second team of the year after hitting .297/.391/.558 with 22 home runs in 380 at-bats.

==== 2018 ====
The Rays promoted Lowe to the major leagues for the first time on August 4, 2018. Lowe recorded his first big league hit on August 15; his first career home run was on August 28. Lowe ended the 2018 season slashing .233/.324/.450 with six home runs and 25 runs batted in over 148 plate appearances. While spending majority of his time at second base, Lowe played 15 games in the outfield.

==== 2019: All-Star season ====
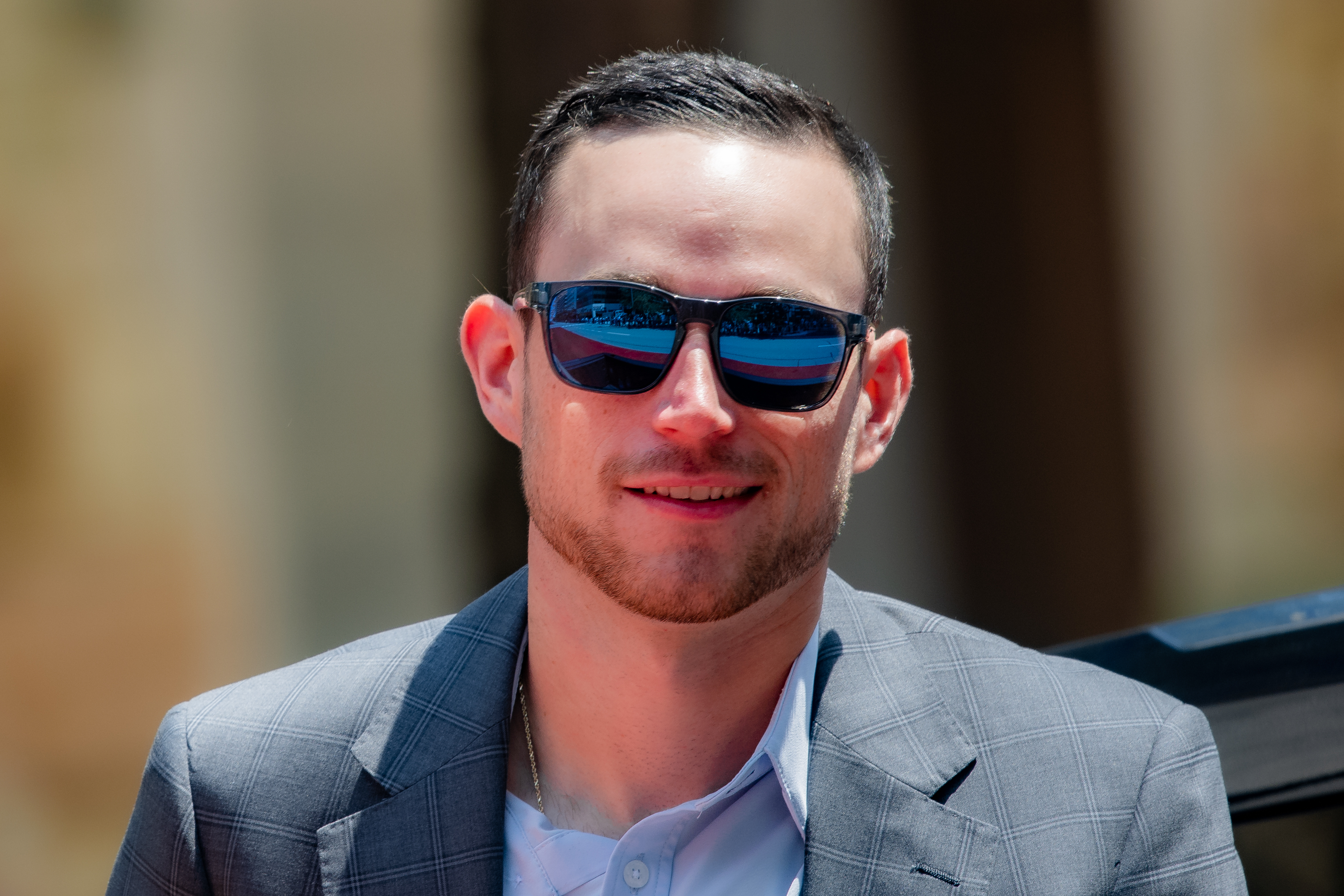
Lowe at the 2019 MLB All-Star Game

On March 20, 2019, Lowe signed a six-year contract extension, with two options, with the Rays for a reported $24 million guaranteed. On April 12, 2019, Lowe went 2-for-5 against the Toronto Blue Jays recording his first multi-homer game of his career. On July 3, Lowe was named as a reserve for the 2019 Major League Baseball All-Star Game, this was his first career All-Star appearance. On August 21, Lowe suffered a left quad strain while rehabbing with Durham, but he returned to the majors on September 22. Lowe finished the 2019 season hitting .270/.336/.514 with 17 home runs and 51 RBI in 82 games. He finished third in American League Rookie of the Year voting.

==== 2020: World Series appearance ====
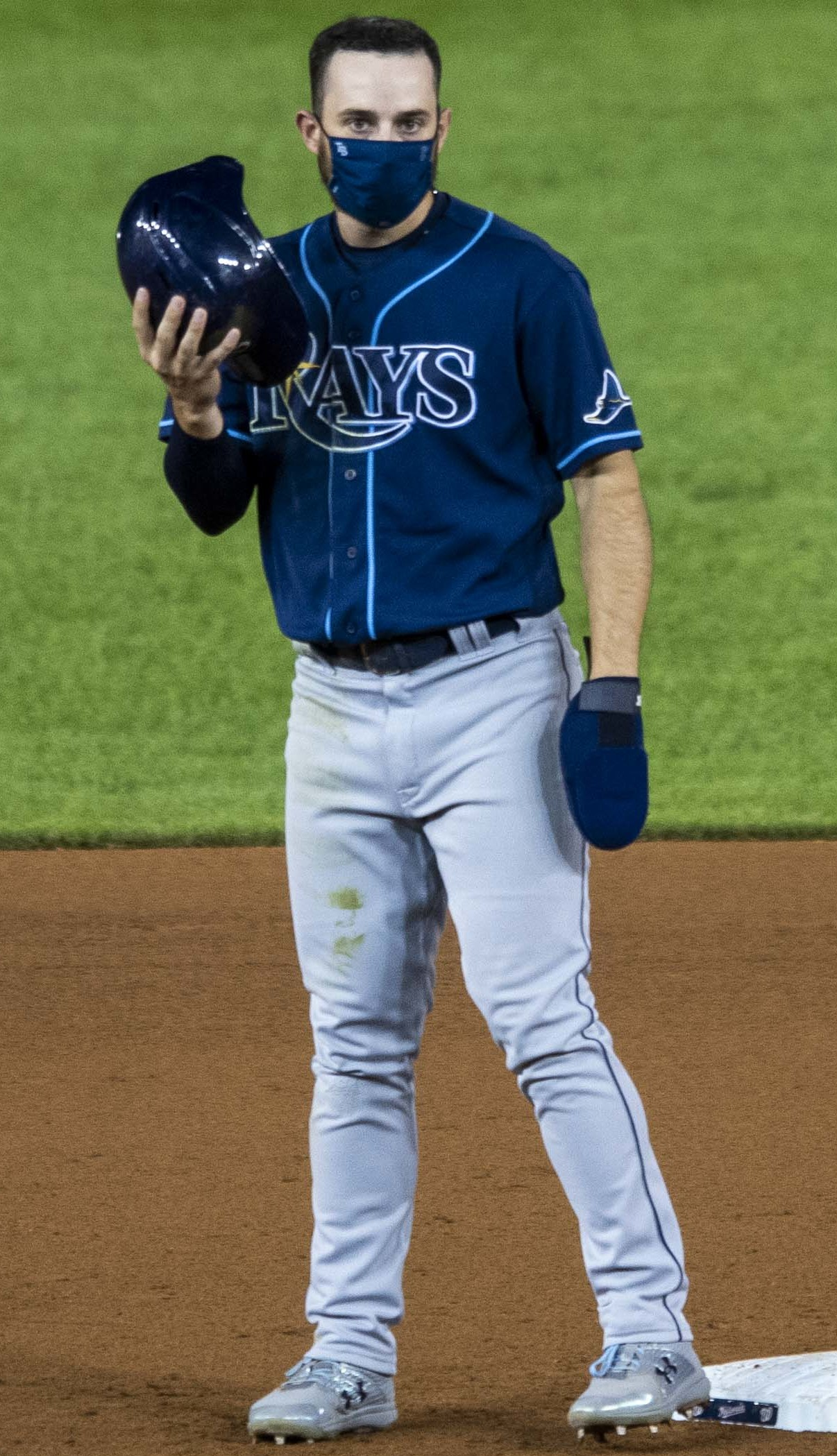
Lowe in 2020

Lowe was named AL Player of the Week by MLB.com after hitting .448 with four home runs during the second week of August. He finished the season hitting .269/.362/.554 with 14 home runs and 37 RBI during the shortened 60-game season. Lowe was named team MVP by the Tampa Bay members of the Baseball Writers' Association of America. The Rays finished the year with the best record in the American League. In the playoffs, Lowe struggled mightily, going 6-for-56 with one home run through the first game of the World Series. Despite his slump, Lowe never batted lower than the third spot in the batting order. In Game 2 of the World Series against the Los Angeles Dodgers, Lowe broke out of his slump, hitting two home runs. His second home run set a record for most home runs by a team in the postseason. He became the first Ray and the 6th-second baseman to hit two home runs in a World Series game.

==== 2021: 39 home run season ====
Lowe entered the 2021 season as the Rays’ starting second baseman. Lowe was named the AL Player of the Week for the week of May 17–23 after batting .437 with three home runs and seven RBI. On October 2, 2021, Lowe hit three home runs against the New York Yankees. He finished the season hitting .247/.340/.523 with 39 home runs and 99 RBI in 149 games, while coming in 10th in American League MVP voting.

==== 2022: Injury plagued season ====
Lowe began the 2022 season starting off slow, ending the month of April batting .177 with three home runs and eight RBI. On May 16, Lowe was placed on the 10-day injured list due to lower-back issues. On July 5, Lowe was transferred to the 60-day IL. On July 16, Lowe was activated off of the 60-day IL. Lowe ended the month of July hitting .340 with three home runs and seven RBI. On August 31, Lowe was placed on the 10-day IL with a right triceps contusion. He was activated September 7. On September 13, Lowe was again placed on the 10-day IL with lower-back discomfort. Lowe finished the season playing in only 65 games and hitting eight home runs.

==== 2023 ====
In 2023, Lowe was an Opening Day starter for the fourth consecutive year. On April 21, Lowe hit a two-run walk-off home run against Reynaldo Lopez of the Chicago White Sox. On June 5, Lowe was placed on the 10-day IL for lower-back inflammation. He was reactivated on July 4. On August 16, Lowe hit his 100th career home run. He became the fastest primary second baseman to hit 100 home runs, doing so in 477 games. This also moved him into 7th all time in Rays franchise home runs, passing Fred McGriff. On August 23, Lowe hit a walk-off single in the 10th inning against Brent Suter of the Colorado Rockies. On September 5, he hit a three-run walk-off home run in the 11th inning against Kenley Jansen of the Boston Red Sox. On September 21, Lowe exited a game against the Los Angeles Angels after he fouled a Griffin Canning pitch hard into his knee. The next day, it was announced that Lowe would be out 4–6 weeks after suffering a fractured right kneecap. The injury ended his season, in which he played in 109 games and batted .231/.328/.443 with 21 home runs and 68 RBI.

==== 2024–25 ====
Lowe split time between second base, first base, and designated hitter throughout the 2024 season. In 107 appearances for the Rays, he slashed .244/.311/.473 with 21 home runs and 58 RBI.

Lowe operated as Tampa Bay's primary second baseman during the 2025 campaign, and earned his second career All-Star appearance. He made 134 appearances for the Rays during the regular season, hitting .256/.307/.477 with 31 home runs and 83 RBI.

=== Pittsburgh Pirates ===
On December 19, 2025, the Rays sent Lowe to the Pittsburgh Pirates in a three-team trade, in which the Pirates also acquired Jake Mangum and Mason Montgomery, the Astros acquired Mike Burrows, and the Rays acquired Jacob Melton and Anderson Brito. On April 12, 2026, Lowe recorded two home runs and five RBI against the Chicago Cubs, including a grand slam off of Jameson Taillon.

== Personal life ==
Lowe grew up in Virginia as a fan of the New York Yankees. He is married to former Maryland college softball player Madison Martin, with whom he has a son. The two met in college when they were both student athletes at the University of Maryland. They reside in Nashville during the offseason.

He is not related to brothers Nathaniel and Josh Lowe, both of whom he played with on the Rays.
