= Esmerlyn Valdez =

Dominican baseball player (born 2004)

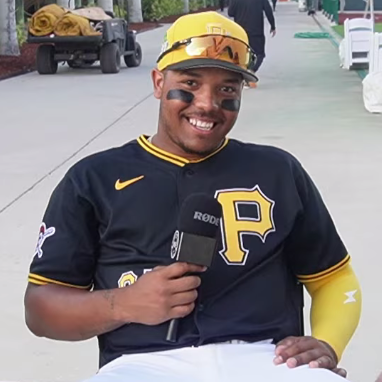
- Valdez with the Pittsburgh Pirates in 2026

Pittsburgh Pirates – No. 55
- Outfielder
- Born: January 27, 2004 (age 22); San Juan de la Maguana, Dominican Republic
- Bats: Right Throws: Right

MLB debut
- May 22, 2026, for the Pittsburgh Pirates

MLB statistics (through September 26, 2026)
- Batting average: .233
- Home runs: 17
- Runs batted in: 46
- Stats at Baseball Reference

Teams
- Pittsburgh Pirates (2026–present)

Esmerlyn Valdez (born January 27, 2004) is a Dominican professional baseball outfielder for the Pittsburgh Pirates of Major League Baseball (MLB). Nicknamed the Magician, he made his MLB debut in 2026.

== Career ==
On January 15, 2021, Valdez signed with the Pittsburgh Pirates organization as an international free agent. He made his professional debut with the Dominican Summer League Pirates. Valdez played in 33 games for the rookie-level Florida Complex League Pirates in 2022, slashing .232/.371/.394 with three home runs and 20 RBI.

Valdez split the 2023 season between the FCL Pirates and Single-A Bradenton Marauders. In 48 appearances for the two affiliates, he hit a cumulative .304/.374/.503 with six home runs, 36 RBI, and three stolen bases. Valdez spent the 2024 campaign with the Marauders, playing in 107 games and batting .226/.352/.464 with career-highs in home runs (22), RBI (61), and stolen bases (four).

Valdez began the 2025 season with the High-A Greensboro Grasshoppers, hitting .303/.385/.592 with 20 home runs and 57 RBI over 72 games. He was selected to represent the Pirates' organization at the 2025 All-Star Futures Game. On June 30, 2025, Valdez was promoted to the Double-A Altoona Curve. He made 51 appearances for Altoona, slashing .260/.363/.409 with six home runs and 29 RBI. On November 18, the Pirates added Valdez to their 40-man roster to protect him from the Rule 5 draft.

Valdez was optioned to the Triple-A Indianapolis Indians to begin the 2026 season. In 46 appearances for the Indians, he batted .253/.381/.506 with 10 home runs and 29 RBI. On May 22, 2026, Valdez was promoted to the major leagues for the first time. Valdez's first hit was also his first home run, in the third game that he played; it came on May 24, as a two-run shot off of Toronto Blue Jays reliever Chase Lee. On July 11, Valdez hit two home runs (including his first career grand slam) in a 7–6 victory over the Milwaukee Brewers.

Awards
Preceded by T. J. Rumfield	National League Rookie of the Month; July 2026	Succeeded by Sal Stewart
