= Mason Montgomery =

American baseball player (born 2000)

Pittsburgh Pirates – No. 46
- Pitcher
- Born: June 17, 2000 (age 26); Austin, Texas, U.S.
- Bats: Left Throws: Left

MLB debut
- September 5, 2024, for the Tampa Bay Rays

MLB statistics (through September 24, 2026)
- Win–loss record: 7–6
- Earned run average: 3.67
- Strikeouts: 182
- Stats at Baseball Reference

Teams
- Tampa Bay Rays (2024–2025); Pittsburgh Pirates (2026–present)

Mason Jack Montgomery (born June 17, 2000) is an American professional baseball pitcher for the Pittsburgh Pirates of Major League Baseball (MLB). He has previously played in MLB for the Tampa Bay Rays. He made his MLB debut in 2024.

== Career ==
=== Tampa Bay Rays ===
Montgomery grew up in Leander, Texas, and attended Leander High School. Montgomery was selected in the 39th round of the 2018 Major League Baseball draft by the Chicago White Sox, but opted not to sign with the team. Montgomery enrolled at Texas Tech University, where he played college baseball for the Texas Tech Red Raiders for three seasons. He had a 5–3 win–loss record with a 3.82 earned run average (ERA) and 84 strikeouts in 63 2/3 innings pitched over 14 outings as a junior.

The Tampa Bay Rays selected Montgomery in the sixth round, with the 191st overall selection, of the 2021 Major League Baseball draft. After signing with the team he was assigned to the Rookie-level Florida Complex League Rays, where he allowed one earned run and struck out 20 batters in 10 2/3 innings pitched. Montgomery was assigned to the High-A Bowling Green Hot Rods to begin the 2022 season. In 27 starts split between Bowling Green and the Double–A Montgomery Biscuits, he accumulated a 6–3 record and 2.10 ERA with 171 strikeouts across 124 innings.

Montgomery split the 2023 campaign between Double–A Montgomery and the Triple–A Durham Bulls. In 29 starts split between the two affiliates, he compiled a 7–4 record and 3.98 ERA with 144 strikeouts over 124 1/3 innings pitched.

Montgomery began the 2024 campaign with Triple–A Durham, compiling a 1–7 record and 6.26 ERA with 105 strikeouts over 31 games (14 starts). On September 5, 2024, Montgomery was selected to the 40-man roster and promoted to the major leagues for the first time. He made nine appearances for Tampa Bay during his rookie campaign, compiling a 1.86 ERA with 17 strikeouts across 9 2/3 innings pitched.

On June 18, 2025, Montgomery recorded his first career win, tossing a scoreless inning against the Baltimore Orioles. He made 57 appearances for the Rays on the year, posting a 1–3 record and 5.67 ERA with 63 strikeouts and one save over 46 innings of work.

=== Pittsburgh Pirates ===
On December 19, 2025, the Rays sent Montgomery to the Pittsburgh Pirates in a three-team trade in which the Pirates also acquired Jake Mangum and Brandon Lowe, the Astros acquired Mike Burrows, and the Rays acquired Jacob Melton and Anderson Brito.

Achievements
Preceded by Trevor Megill	National League Reliever of the Month; September 2026	Most recent
