= 2025 Pittsburgh Pirates season =

2025 Pittsburgh Pirates
- League: National League
- Division: Central
- Ballpark: PNC Park
- City: Pittsburgh, Pennsylvania (Note: From 1882–1906, the team played in Allegheny, Pennsylvania, which became annexed by Pittsburgh as the North Side in 1907.)
- Record: 71–91 (.438)
- Divisional place: 5th
- Owners: Bob Nutting
- General managers: Ben Cherington
- Managers: Derek Shelton (first 38 games); Don Kelly (Interim)
- Television: SportsNet Pittsburgh
- Radio: KDKA-FM; Pittsburgh Pirates Radio Network
- Stats: ESPN.com; Baseball Reference

The 2025 Pittsburgh Pirates season was the franchise's 144th season overall, 139th season as a member of the National League, and 25th season at PNC Park.

On May 8, manager Derek Shelton was fired after posting a 12–26 record to begin the season. Bench coach Don Kelly was named manager the same day.

On June 28, franchise legend Dave Parker died from complications of Parkinson's disease at the age of 74. As a member of the Pirates, Parker won two National League batting titles, was the 1978 National League Most Valuable Player, and was a member of the 1979 World Series team. His death occurred 29 days before his scheduled Baseball Hall of Fame induction.

The Pirates finished with a record of 71–91, failing to improve on their 76–86 record from the previous season and missing the playoffs for the tenth straight year. Kelly finished the season with a 59–65 (.476) record. Despite the team's offensive woes, in which they finished last in MLB for runs scored with 583, the Pirates' pitching staff ranked fifth in runs allowed with 645, and led MLB in shutouts with 19. Leading the staff was Paul Skenes, who won the team's first Cy Young award since Doug Drabek in 1990.

== Offseason ==
The Pirates finished the 2024 season with a 76–86 record, failing to make the playoffs for the ninth consecutive season.

=== Transactions ===
==== 2024 ====
- December 23 – Re-signed outfielder Andrew McCutchen to a one-year contract.

==== 2025 ====
- January 10 – Signed LHP Caleb Ferguson to a one-year contract.
- January 28 – Signed Adam Frazier to a one-year contract.
- February 3 – Signed LHP Tim Mayza to a one-year contract.

== Regular season ==
=== Season standings ===
==== National League Central ====
NL Central
Team	W	L	Pct.	GB	Home	Road
Milwaukee Brewers	97	65	.599	—	52‍–‍29	45‍–‍36
Chicago Cubs	92	70	.568	5	50‍–‍31	42‍–‍39
Cincinnati Reds	83	79	.512	14	45‍–‍36	38‍–‍43
St. Louis Cardinals	78	84	.481	19	44‍–‍37	34‍–‍47
Pittsburgh Pirates	71	91	.438	26	44‍–‍37	27‍–‍54

==== National League Wild Card ====
Division leaders
Team	W	L	Pct.
Milwaukee Brewers	97	65	.599
Philadelphia Phillies	96	66	.593
Los Angeles Dodgers	93	69	.574

Wild Card teams (Top 3 teams qualify for postseason)
Team	W	L	Pct.	GB
Chicago Cubs	92	70	.568	+9
San Diego Padres	90	72	.556	+7
Cincinnati Reds	83	79	.512	—
New York Mets	83	79	.512	—
San Francisco Giants	81	81	.500	2
Arizona Diamondbacks	80	82	.494	3
Miami Marlins	79	83	.488	4
St. Louis Cardinals	78	84	.481	5
Atlanta Braves	76	86	.469	7
Pittsburgh Pirates	71	91	.438	12
Washington Nationals	66	96	.407	17
Colorado Rockies	43	119	.265	40

==== Record vs. opponents ====
===== Record vs. National League =====
2025 National League record Source: MLB Standings Grid – 2025
Team	AZ	ATL	CHC	CIN	COL	LAD	MIA	MIL	NYM	PHI	PIT	SD	SF	STL	WSH	AL
Arizona	—	4–2	3–4	2–4	8–5	6–7	3–3	4–3	3–3	3–3	2–4	5–8	7–6	3–3	2–4	25–23
Atlanta	2–4	—	2–4	5–2	4–2	1–5	8–5	2–4	8–5	5–8	2–4	1–6	1–5	4–2	9–4	22–26
Chicago	4–3	4–2	—	5–8	5–1	4–3	4–2	7–6	2–4	2–4	10–3	3–3	1–5	8–5	3–3	30–18
Cincinnati	4–2	2–5	8–5	—	5–1	1–5	3–4	5–8	4–2	3–3	7–6	4–2	3–3	6–7	2–4	26–22
Colorado	5–8	2–4	1–5	1–5	—	2–11	3–3	2–4	0–6	0–7	2–4	3–10	2–11	4–2	4–3	12–36
Los Angeles	7–6	5–1	3–4	5–1	11–2	—	5–1	0–6	3–4	2–4	2–4	9–4	9–4	2–4	3–3	27–21
Miami	3–3	5–8	2–4	4–3	3–3	1–5	—	3–3	7–6	4–9	4–3	3–3	4–2	3–3	7–6	26–22
Milwaukee	3–4	4–2	6–7	8–5	4–2	6–0	3–3	—	4–2	4–2	10–3	2–4	2–5	7–6	6–0	28–20
New York	3–3	5–8	4–2	2–4	6–0	4–3	6–7	2–4	—	7–6	2–4	2–4	4–2	5–2	7–6	24–24
Philadelphia	3–3	8–5	4–2	3–3	7–0	4–2	9–4	2–4	6–7	—	3–3	3–3	3–4	2–4	8–5	31–17
Pittsburgh	4–2	4–2	3–10	6–7	4–2	4–2	3–4	3–10	4–2	3–3	—	1–5	4–2	7–6	4–3	17–31
San Diego	8–5	6–1	3–3	2–4	10–3	4–9	3–3	4–2	4–2	3–3	5–1	—	10–3	4–3	4–2	20–28
San Francisco	6–7	5–1	5–1	3–3	11–2	4–9	2–4	5–2	2–4	4–3	2–4	3–10	—	2–4	3–3	24–24
St. Louis	3–3	2–4	5–8	7–6	2–4	4–2	3–3	6–7	2–5	4–2	6–7	3–4	4–2	—	5–1	22–26
Washington	4–2	4–9	3–3	4–2	3–4	3–3	6–7	0–6	6–7	5–8	3–4	2–4	3–3	1–5	—	19–29

Updated with the results of all games through September 28, 2025.

===== Record vs. American League =====
2025 National League record vs. American League Source: MLB Standings
Team	ATH	BAL	BOS	CWS	CLE	DET	HOU	KC	LAA	MIN	NYY	SEA	TB	TEX	TOR
Arizona	2–1	2–1	2–1	2–1	2–1	0–3	0–3	1–2	1–2	2–1	2–1	3–0	1–2	4–2	1–2
Atlanta	1–2	0–3	3–3	2–1	3–0	3–0	1–2	1–2	1–2	3–0	1–2	1–2	1–2	0–3	1–2
Chicago	3–0	2–1	2–1	5–1	3–0	1–2	1–2	1–2	3–0	1–2	2–1	1–2	2–1	2–1	1–2
Cincinnati	0–3	2–1	1–2	1–2	5–1	2–1	1–2	2–1	2–1	2–1	2–1	1–2	3–0	1–2	1–2
Colorado	1–2	1–2	0–3	1–2	1–2	0–3	2–4	0–3	2–1	2–1	1–2	0–3	1–2	0–3	0–3
Los Angeles	2–1	1–2	1–2	3–0	2–1	3–0	0–3	2–1	0–6	2–1	2–1	3–0	2–1	2–1	2–1
Miami	1–2	2–1	1–2	1–2	1–2	2–1	1–2	2–1	2–1	2–1	3–0	1–2	3–3	3–0	1–2
Milwaukee	2–1	2–1	3–0	2–1	1–2	2–1	2–1	2–1	3–0	4–2	0–3	2–1	1–2	0–3	2–1
New York	2–1	1–2	1–2	2–1	0–3	2–1	1–2	2–1	3–0	1–2	3–3	2–1	0–3	1–2	3–0
Philadelphia	2–1	2–1	2–1	1–2	2–1	2–1	0–3	2–1	1–2	2–1	2–1	3–0	3–0	3–0	4–2
Pittsburgh	2–1	0–3	2–1	0–3	0–3	4–2	1–2	0–3	2–1	1–2	1–2	0–3	1–2	1–2	2–1
San Diego	2–1	0–3	2–1	2–1	3–0	1–2	1–2	2–1	2–1	1–2	1–2	1–5	0–3	2–1	0–3
San Francisco	5–1	2–1	2–1	1–2	1–2	0–3	3–0	1–2	1–2	0–3	2–1	3–0	1–2	2–1	0–3
St. Louis	2–1	2–1	0–3	3–0	3–0	1–2	2–1	3–3	1–2	3–0	0–3	0–3	1–2	1–2	0–3
Washington	1–2	5–1	0–3	1–2	1–2	2–1	1–2	1–2	2–1	2–1	0–3	2–1	0–3	1–2	0–3

Updated with the results of all games through September 28, 2025.

=== Game log ===
Legend
	Pirates win
	Pirates loss
	Postponement
	Eliminated from playoff race
**Bold**	Pirates team member

2025 Game Log: 71–91 (Home: 44–37; Away: 27–54)
March/April: 12–19 (Home: 7–8; Away: 5–11)

#	Date	Opponent	Score	Win	Loss	Save	Attendance	Record	Streak
1	March 27	@ Marlins	4–5	Tinoco (1–0)	**Bednar** (0–1)	—	31,534	0–1	L1
2	March 28	@ Marlins	4–3	**Keller** (1–0)	Gillispie (0–1)	**Bednar** (1)	9,590	1–1	W1
3	March 29	@ Marlins	4–5 (12)	Soriano (1–0)	**Wentz** (0–1)	―	10,207	1–2	L1
4	March 30	@ Marlins	2–3	Bender (1–0)	**Bednar** (0–2)	―	15,490	1–3	L2
5	March 31	@ Rays	1–6	Rasmussen (1–0)	**Mlodzinski** (0–1)	―	10,046	1–4	L3
6	April 1	@ Rays	0–7	Baz (1–0)	**Harrington** (0–1)	―	10,046	1–5	L4
7	April 2	@ Rays	4–2	**Skenes** (1–0)	Pepiot (0–1)	**Santana** (1)	10,046	2–5	W1
8	April 4	Yankees	4–9	Fried (1–0)	**Keller** (1–1)	―	36,893	2–6	L1
9	April 5	Yankees	4–10	Leiter Jr. (1–1)	**Falter** (0–1)	―	30,570	2–7	L2
10	April 6	Yankees	5–4 (11)	**Wentz** (1–1)	Williams (0–1)	―	22,898	3–7	W1
11	April 7	Cardinals	8–4	**Mlodzinski** (1–1)	Liberatore (0–1)	**Harrington** (1)	8,250	4–7	W2
12	April 8	Cardinals	3–5	Gray (2–0)	**Skenes** (1–1)	Maton (1)	8,291	4–8	L1
13	April 9	Cardinals	2–1 (13)	**Lawrence** (1–0)	Roycroft (0–2)	―	8,430	5–8	W1
14	April 11	@ Reds	3–5	Singer (3–0)	**Falter** (0–2)	Pagán (3)	16,375	5–9	L1
15	April 12	@ Reds	2–5	Abbott (1–0)	**Heaney** (0–1)	Pagán (4)	31,188	5–10	L2
16	April 13	@ Reds	0–4	Greene (2–1)	**Mlodzinski** (1–2)	―	24,358	5–11	L3
17	April 14	Nationals	10–3	**Skenes** (2–1)	Lord (0–1)	―	10,402	6–11	W1
18	April 15	Nationals	0–3	Irvin (1–0)	**Keller** (1–2)	Finnegan (6)	8,340	6–12	L1
19	April 16	Nationals	6–1	**Falter** (1–2)	Parker (2–1)	―	8,529	7–12	W1
20	April 17	Nationals	1–0	**Heaney** (1–1)	Williams (1–2)	**Santana** (2)	12,748	8–12	W2
21	April 18	Guardians	7–10	Ortiz (2–2)	**Mlodzinski** (1–3)	Clase (3)	27,900	8–13	L1
22	April 19	Guardians	0–3	Lively (1–2)	**Skenes** (2–2)	Clase (4)	37,713	8–14	L2
23	April 20	Guardians	4–5 (10)	Clase (3–0)	**Santana** (0–1)	Cantillo (1)	12,433	8–15	L3
24	April 22	@ Angels	9–3	**Shugart** (1–0)	Soriano (2–3)	―	30,439	9–15	W1
25	April 23	@ Angels	3–0	**Heaney** (2–1)	Kochanowicz (1–3)	**Santana** (3)	31,256	10–15	W2
26	April 24	@ Angels	3–4	Zeferjahn (2–0)	**Shugart** (1–1)	Jansen (6)	29,060	10–16	L1
27	April 25	@ Dodgers	3–0	**Skenes** (3–2)	Yamamoto (3–2)	**Bednar** (2)	53,655	11–16	W1
28	April 26	@ Dodgers	4–8	Yates (2–1)	**Holderman** (0–1)	―	54,012	11–17	L1
29	April 27	@ Dodgers	2–9	Casparius (3–0)	**Falter** (1–3)	Gómez (1)	49,512	11–18	L2
30	April 29	Cubs	0–9	Imanaga (3–1)	**Heaney** (2–2)	―	9,434	11–19	L3
31	April 30	Cubs	4–3	**Ferguson** (1–0)	Thielbar (1–1)	**Bednar** (3)	11,297	12–19	W1

May: 10–18 (Home: 6–8; Away: 4–10)

#	Date	Opponent	Score	Win	Loss	Save	Attendance	Record	Streak
32	May 1	Cubs	3–8	Rea (2–0)	**Skenes** (3–3)	―	13,633	12–20	L1
33	May 2	Padres	4–9	Estrada (1–1)	**Keller** (1–3)	―	12,349	12–21	L2
34	May 3	Padres	1–2	Adam (3–0)	**Bednar** (0–3)	Suárez (13)	17,675	12–22	L3
35	May 4	Padres	0–4	Kolek (1–0)	**Heaney** (2–3)	―	17,184	12–23	L4
36	May 5	@ Cardinals	3–6	Graceffo (2–0)	**Shugart** (1–2)	Helsley (6)	22,369	12–24	L5
37	May 6	@ Cardinals	1–2	Liberatore (3–3)	**Skenes** (3–4)	Graceffo (1)	25,307	12–25	L6
38	May 7	@ Cardinals	0–5	Gray (4–1)	**Keller** (1–4)	―	27,453	12–26	L7
39	May 9	Braves	3–2	**Falter** (2–3)	Elder (2–2)	**Santana** (4)	19,357	13–26	W1
40	May 10	Braves	2–3 (11)	Blewett (2–0)	**Shugart** (1–3)	―	27,767	13–27	L1
41	May 11	Braves	4–3	**Santana** (1–1)	Iglesias (2–3)	―	17,845	14–27	W1
42	May 12	@ Mets	3–4	Brazobán (2–0)	**Bednar** (0–4)	―	35,580	14–28	L1
43	May 13	@ Mets	1–2	Kranick (3–1)	**Keller** (1–5)	Díaz (9)	35,926	14–29	L2
44	May 14	@ Mets	4–0	**Shugart** (2–3)	Holmes (5–2)	—	34,473	15–29	W1
45	May 16	@ Phillies	4–8	Suárez (2–0)	**Borucki** (0–1)	Alvarado (7)	44,039	15–30	L1
46	May 17	@ Phillies	2–5	Wheeler (5–1)	**Mlodzinski** (1–4)	—	44,164	15–31	L2
47	May 18	@ Phillies	0–1	Abel (1–0)	**Skenes** (3–5)	Romano (5)	44,356	15–32	L3
48	May 19	Reds	1–7	Lodolo (4–4)	**Keller** (1–6)	―	10,842	15–33	L4
49	May 20	Reds	1–0	**Falter** (3–3)	Martinez (2–5)	**Bednar** (4)	10,071	16–33	W1
50	May 21	Reds	3–1	**Heaney** (3–3)	Singer (5–3)	**Santana** (5)	17,308	17–33	W2
51	May 22	Brewers	5–8	Rodríguez (1-0)	**Burrows** (0–1)	Megill (8)	10,114	17–34	L1
52	May 23	Brewers	6–5 (10)	**Borucki** (1–1)	Uribe (2–1)	―	24,646	18–34	W1
53	May 24	Brewers	2–1	**Shugart** (3–3)	Alexander (2–5)	**Bednar** (5)	24,651	19–34	W2
54	May 25	Brewers	5–6	Koenig (3–1)	**Borucki** (1–2)	Megill (9)	18,920	19–35	L1
55	May 26	@ Diamondbacks	0–5	Nelson (2–1)	**Heaney** (3–4)	―	25,697	19–36	L2
56	May 27	@ Diamondbacks	9–6	**Wentz** (2–1)	Ginkel (0–3)	**Bednar** (6)	20,739	20–36	W1
57	May 28	@ Diamondbacks	10–1	**Skenes** (4–5)	Gallen (3–7)	―	25,202	21–36	W2
58	May 30	@ Padres	2–3	Pivetta (6–3)	**Keller** (1–7)	Suárez (18)	42,579	21–37	L1
59	May 31	@ Padres	5–0	**Falter** (4–3)	Cease (1–4)	―	42,471	22–37	W1

June: 14–13 (Home: 11–5; Away: 3–8)

#	Date	Opponent	Score	Win	Loss	Save	Attendance	Record	Streak
60	June 1	@ Padres	4–6	Morejón (3–2)	**Rainey** (0–1)	Suárez (19)	42,069	22–38	L1
61	June 3	Astros	0–3	McCullers Jr. (1–1)	**Skenes** (4–6)	Hader (16)	15,891	22–39	L2
62	June 4	Astros	3–0	**Burrows** (1–1)	Gusto (3–3)	**Bednar** (7)	12,359	23–39	W1
63	June 5	Astros	2–8	Valdez (6–4)	**Keller** (1–8)	―	13,775	23–40	L1
64	June 6	Phillies	5–4	**Bednar** (1–4)	Romano (0–3)	―	23,243	24–40	W1
65	June 7	Phillies	2–1	**Mattson** (1–0)	Suárez (4–1)	**Bednar** (8)	32,951	25–40	W2
66	June 8	Phillies	2–1	**Ashcraft** (1–0)	Sánchez (5–2)	―	25,261	26–40	W3
67	June 9	Marlins	10–3	**Ferguson** (2–0)	Pérez (0–1)	―	9,283	27–40	W4
68	June 10	Marlins	2–3	Alcántara (3–7)	**Keller** (1–9)	Faucher (5)	14,465	27–41	L1
69	June 11	Marlins	5–2	**Falter** (5–3)	Quantrill (3–7)	**Bednar** (9)	16,709	28–41	W1
70	June 12	@ Cubs	2–3	Taillon (7–3)	**Heaney** (3–5)	Pressly (5)	40,174	28–42	L1
71	June 13	@ Cubs	2–1 (10)	**Santana** (2–1)	Pomeranz (2–1)	**Bednar** (10)	39,457	29–42	W1
72	June 14	@ Cubs	1–2	Boyd (6–3)	**Borucki** (1–3)	Palencia (6)	39,554	29–43	L1
73	June 15	@ Cubs	2–3 (10)	Flexen (4–0)	**Bednar** (1–5)	―	40,162	29–44	L2
74	June 17	@ Tigers	3–7	Mize (7–2)	**Mlodzinski** (1–5)	―	27,449	29–45	L3
―	June 18	@ Tigers	Postponed (rain); Makeup: June 19						
75	June 19 (1)	@ Tigers	2–9	Skubal (8–2)	**Heaney** (3–6)	―	33,368	29–46	L4
76	June 19 (2)	@ Tigers	8–4	**Bednar** (2–5)	Hurter (2–2)	―	28,540	30–46	W1
77	June 20	Rangers	2–6	deGrom (7–2)	**Burrows** (1–2)	―	31,327	30–47	L1
78	June 21	Rangers	2–3	Rocker (3–4)	**Keller** (1–10)	Martin (2)	23,819	30–48	L2
79	June 22	Rangers	8–3	**Falter** (6–3)	Leiter (4–5)	—	20,341	31–48	W1
80	June 23	@ Brewers	5–4	**Shugart** (4–3)	Mears (1–1)	**Bednar** (11)	26,791	32–48	W2
81	June 24	@ Brewers	3–9	Peralta (8–4)	**Heaney** (3–7)	―	31,772	32–49	L1
82	June 25	@ Brewers	2–4	Misiorowski (3–0)	**Skenes** (4–7)	Megill (18)	42,774	32–50	L2
83	June 27	Mets	9–1	**Keller** (2–10)	Peterson (5–4)	—	29,055	33–50	W1
84	June 28	Mets	9–2	**Ashcraft** (2–0)	Blackburn (0–3)	—	30,649	34–50	W2
85	June 29	Mets	12–1	**Mlodzinski** (2–5)	Montas (0–1)	—	24,898	35–50	W3
86	June 30	Cardinals	7–0	**Heaney** (4–7)	Fedde (3–8)	—	12,387	36–50	W4

July: 11–12 (Home: 7–4; Away: 4–8)

#	Date	Opponent	Score	Win	Loss	Save	Attendance	Record	Streak
87	July 1	Cardinals	1–0	**Mattson** (2–0)	Maton (1–3)	**Bednar** (12)	19,631	37–50	W5
88	July 2	Cardinals	5–0	**Keller** (3–10)	Gray (8–3)	—	15,979	38–50	W6
89	July 4	@ Mariners	0–6	Woo (8–4)	**Falter** (6–4)	—	33,061	38–51	L1
90	July 5	@ Mariners	0–1	Castillo (5–5)	**Ferguson** (2–1)	Muñoz (20)	32,295	38–52	L2
91	July 6	@ Mariners	0–1	Kirby (3–4)	**Mlodzinski** (2–6)	Muñoz (21)	35,174	38–53	L3
92	July 7	@ Royals	3–9	Cameron (3–4)	**Heaney** (4–8)	―	18,614	38–54	L4
93	July 8	@ Royals	3–4	Estévez (3–2)	**Santana** (2–2)	—	22,855	38–55	L5
94	July 9	@ Royals	3–4	Erceg (4–2)	**Mattson** (2–1)	Estévez (25)	18,398	38–56	L6
95	July 11	@ Twins	1–2	Ryan (9–4)	**Skenes** (4–8)	Durán (15)	40,100	38–57	L7
96	July 12	@ Twins	4–12	Adams (1–0)	**Burrows** (1–3)	—	26,496	38–58	L8
97	July 13	@ Twins	2–1	**Santana** (3–2)	Durán (5–4)	**Bednar** (13)	24,959	39–58	W1
**95th All-Star Game in Cumberland, GA**
98	July 18	White Sox	1–10	Cannon (4–7)	**Falter** (6–5)	—	28,899	39–59	L1
99	July 19	White Sox	4–10	Gilbert (3–1)	**Ferguson** (2–2)	—	38,041	39–60	L2
100	July 20	White Sox	2–7	Civale (2–6)	**Heaney** (4–9)	—	19,631	39–61	L3
101	July 21	Tigers	3–0	**Skenes** (5–8)	Flaherty (5–10)	**Bednar** (14)	19,379	40–61	W1
102	July 22	Tigers	8–5	**Keller** (4–10)	Mize (9–4)	**Bednar** (15)	17,257	41–61	W2
103	July 23	Tigers	6–1	**Falter** (7–5)	Melton (0–1)	—	17,248	42–61	W3
104	July 25	Diamondbacks	0–1 (11)	DeSclafani (1–1)	**Ashcraft** (2–1)	Ginkel (3)	21,296	42–62	L1
105	July 26	Diamondbacks	2–0	**Heaney** (5–9)	Kelly (9–6)	**Bednar** (16)	27,425	43–62	W1
106	July 27	Diamondbacks	6–0	**Skenes** (6–8)	Gallen (7–12)	—	20,779	44–62	W2
107	July 28	@ Giants	6–5	**Ramírez** (1–0)	Seymour (0–1)	**Bednar** (17)	35,572	45–62	W3
108	July 29	@ Giants	3–1	**Ashcraft** (3–1)	Rogers (4–3)	**Santana** (6)	38,142	46–62	W4
109	July 30	@ Giants	2–1 (10)	**Mattson** (3–1)	Walker (2–4)	―	38,144	47–62	W5

August: 14–15 (Home: 8–5; Away: 6–10)

#	Date	Opponent	Score	Win	Loss	Save	Attendance	Record	Streak
110	August 1	@ Rockies	16–17	Darnell (1–0)	**Santana** (3–3)	―	36,030	47–63	L1
111	August 2	@ Rockies	5–8	Hill (1–0)	**Ashcraft** (3–2)	―	33,046	47–64	L2
112	August 3	@ Rockies	9–5	**Keller** (5–10)	Blalock (1–3)	―	32,394	48–64	W1
113	August 4	Giants	5–4	**Moreta** (1–0)	Rodríguez (3–3)	—	13,921	49–64	W2
114	August 5	Giants	1–8	Webb (10–8)	**Burrows** (1–4)	—	18,421	49–65	L1
115	August 6	Giants	2–4	Walker (4–4)	**Santana** (3–4)	Rodríguez (3)	14,005	49–66	L2
116	August 7	Reds	7–0	**Skenes** (7–8)	Singer (9–9)	—	20,339	50–66	W1
117	August 8	Reds	3–2	**Nicolas** (1–0)	Santillan (1–4)	**Santana** (7)	22,092	51–66	W2
118	August 9	Reds	1–2	Martinez (10–9)	**Mlodzinski** (2–7)	Pagán (25)	30,274	51–67	L1
119	August 10	Reds	8–14	Barlow (6–0)	**Ramírez** (1–1)	―	21,239	51–68	L2
120	August 11	@ Brewers	1–7	Quintana (10–4)	**Heaney** (5–10)	—	30,045	51–69	L3
121	August 12	@ Brewers	0–14	Peralta (14–5)	**Skenes** (7–9)	—	32,064	51–70	L4
122	August 13	@ Brewers	5–12	Koenig (5–1)	**Keller** (5–11)	—	40,123	51–71	L5
123	August 15	@ Cubs	3–2	**Santana** (4–4)	Palencia (1–3)	—	40,044	52–71	W1
124	August 16	@ Cubs	1–3	Kittredge (3–3)	**Sisk** (0–1)	Keller (1)	40,062	52–72	L1
125	August 17	@ Cubs	3–4	Thielbar (3–3)	**Mattson** (3–2)	Kittredge (1)	38,012	52–73	L2
126	August 18	Blue Jays	5–2	**Sisk** (1–1)	Rodríguez (2–1)	**Santana** (8)	17,477	53–73	W1
127	August 19	Blue Jays	3–7	Scherzer (4–2)	**Keller** (5–12)	—	14,282	53–74	L1
128	August 20	Blue Jays	2–1	**Oviedo** (1–0)	Bassitt (11–7)	**Santana** (9)	14,019	54–74	W1
129	August 22	Rockies	9–0	**Ashcraft** (4–2)	Senzatela (4–15)	**Chandler** (1)	22,886	55–74	W2
130	August 23	Rockies	5–1	**Mlodzinski** (3–7)	Freeland (3–13)	—	22,588	56–74	W3
131	August 24	Rockies	4–0	**Skenes** (8–9)	Brown (0–1)	—	20,300	57–74	W4
132	August 25	@ Cardinals	6–7	O'Brien (2–0)	**Santana** (4–5)	—	17,675	57–75	L1
133	August 26	@ Cardinals	8–3	**Keller** (6–12)	Pallante (6–12)	—	18,602	58–75	W1
134	August 27	@ Cardinals	2–1	**Chandler** (1–0)	Gray (12–7)	**Santana** (10)	19,836	59–75	W2
135	August 28	@ Cardinals	1–4	Leahy (4–1)	**Ramírez** (1–2)	Romero (5)	18,894	59–76	L1
136	August 29	@ Red Sox	4–2	**Skenes** (9–9)	Weissert (6–5)	**Santana** (11)	36,344	60–76	W1
137	August 30	@ Red Sox	10–3	**Oviedo** (2–0)	May (7–11)	—	36,391	61–76	W2
138	August 31	@ Red Sox	2–5	Giolito (10–2)	**Keller** (6–13)	Chapman (27)	36,583	61–77	L1

September: 10–14 (Home: 5–7; Away: 5–6)

#	Date	Opponent	Score	Win	Loss	Save	Attendance	Record	Streak
139	September 2	Dodgers	9–7	**Chandler** (2–0)	Henriquez (0–1)	**Santana** (12)	14,330	62–77	W1
140	September 3	Dodgers	3–0	**Burrows** (2–4)	Sheehan (5–3)	**Santana** (13)	16,473	63–77	W2
141	September 4	Dodgers	5–3	**Skenes** (10–9)	Snell (3–4)	**Holderman** (1)	20,563	64–77	W3
142	September 5	Brewers	2–5	Priester (12–2)	**Mlodzinski** (3–8)	Uribe (5)	14,122	64–78	L1
143	September 6	Brewers	1–4	Woodruff (6–2)	**Keller** (6–14)	Ashby (3)	17,975	64–79	L2
144	September 7	Brewers	2–10	Misiorowski (5–2)	**Chandler** (2–1)	—	12,443	64–80	L3
145	September 9	@ Orioles	2–3 (11)	Enns (3–2)	**Moreta** (1–1)	—	15,488	64–81	L4
146	September 10	@ Orioles	1–2 (10)	Suárez (2–0)	**Nicolas** (1–1)	—	18,210	64–82	L5
147	September 11	@ Orioles	2–3	Wolfram (3–0)	**Holderman** (0–2)	Akin (5)	13,957	64–83	L6
148	September 12	@ Nationals	5–6	Poulin (2–1)	**Nicolas** (1–2)	Ferrer (9)	18,021	64–84	L7
149	September 13	@ Nationals	5–1	**Mlodzinski** (4–8)	Henry (1–2)	―	29,887	65–84	W1
150	September 14	@ Nationals	3–4	Rutledge (4–2)	**Mattson** (3–3)	Beeter (1)	20,208	65–85	L1
151	September 15	Cubs	0–4	Taillon (10–6)	**Ashcraft** (4–3)	Keller (2)	15,706	65–86	L2
152	September 16	Cubs	1–4	Horton (11–4)	**Skenes** (10–10)	Keller (3)	14,714	65–87	L3
153	September 17	Cubs	4–8	Civale (4–9)	**Ramírez** (1–3)	―	13,488	65–88	L4
154	September 19	Athletics	3–4	Severino (7–11)	**Keller** (6–15)	Kelly (2)	20,584	65–89	L5
155	September 20	Athletics	2–0	**Chandler** (3–1)	Morales (4–2)	**Santana** (14)	18,209	66–89	W1
156	September 21	Athletics	11–0	**Mlodzinski** (5–8)	Spence (3–6)	—	16,107	67–89	W2
157	September 23	@ Reds	4–2	**Barco** (1–0)	Singer (14–11)	**Santana** (15)	29,847	68–89	W3
158	September 24	@ Reds	4–3 (11)	**Ramírez** (2–3)	Martinez (11–14)	―	30,725	69–89	W4
159	September 25	@ Reds	1–2	Lodolo (9–8)	**Ashcraft** (4–4)	Pagán (30)	24,249	69–90	L1
160	September 26	@ Braves	9–3	**Ramírez** (3–3)	Wentz (5–7)	―	34,500	70–90	W1
161	September 27	@ Braves	3–1	**Chandler** (4–1)	Strider (7–14)	**Santana** (16)	35,007	71–90	W2
162	September 28	@ Braves	1–4	Sale (7–5)	**Oviedo** (2–1)	Iglesias (29)	35,827	71–91	L1

== Roster ==
2025 Pittsburgh Pirates
Roster
Pitchers: 67 Braxton Ashcraft; 45 Hunter Barco; 51 David Bednar; 43 Ryan Borucki; 53 Mike Burrows; 92 Génesis Cabrera; 57 Bubba Chandler; 41 Michael Darrell-Hicks; 6 Bailey Falter; 64 Caleb Ferguson; 78 Tom Harrington; 45 Andrew Heaney; 35 Colin Holderman; 23 Mitch Keller; 61 Justin Lawrence; 72 Isaac Mattson; 18 Tim Mayza; 50 Carmen Mlodzinski; 36 Dauri Moreta; 66 Kyle Nicolas; 24 Johan Oviedo; 27 Tanner Rainey; 49 Yohan Ramírez; 64 Cam Sanders; 60 Dennis Santana; 55 Chase Shugart; 51 Evan Sisk; 30 Paul Skenes; 63 Hunter Stratton; 34 Joey Wentz	Catchers: 14 Joey Bart; 32 Henry Davis; 59 Brett Sullivan; Infielders: 71 Tsung-Che Cheng; 34 Cam Devanney; 43 Rafael Flores; 26 Adam Frazier; 39 Nick Gonzales; 62 Matt Gorski; 13 Ke'Bryan Hayes; 2 Spencer Horwitz; 7 Isiah Kiner-Falefa; 31 Liover Peguero; 5 Endy Rodríguez; 46 Nick Solak; 19 Jared Triolo; 48 Enmanuel Valdez; 38 Nick Yorke	Outfielders: 3 Ji-hwan Bae; 29 Alexander Canario; 25 Billy Cook; 15 Oneil Cruz; 22 Andrew McCutchen; 28 Tommy Pham; 10 Bryan Reynolds; 63 Ronny Simon; 65 Jack Suwinski	Manager: 12 Don Kelly; 17 Derek Shelton; Coaches: 16 Tarrik Brock (first base); 82 Jordan Comadena (bullpen catcher); 52 Matt Hague (hitting); 90 Raul Hernandez (bullpen catcher); 12 Don Kelly (bench); 54 Gene Lamont (special advisor); 96 Mendy López (infield); 47 Oscar Marin (pitching); 88 Christian Marrero (assistant hitting); 95 Stephen Morales (coach / translator); 87 Miguel Pérez (bullpen); 58 Mike Rabelo (third base); 56 Brent Strom (assistant pitching); 44 Chris Truby (coach); 98 Jonny Tucker (coach)

== Player stats ==
= Indicates team leader

= Indicates league leader

=== Batting ===
Note: G = Games played; AB = At bats; R = Runs scored; H = Hits; 2B = Doubles; 3B = Triples; HR = Home runs; RBI = Runs batted in; SB = Stolen bases; BB = Walks; AVG = Batting average; SLG = Slugging average

Player	G	AB	R	H	2B	3B	HR	RBI	SB	BB	AVG	SLG
Bryan Reynolds	154	587	68	144	38	3	16	73	3	57	.245	.402
Andrew McCutchen	135	477	51	114	22	0	13	57	1	67	.239	.367
Oneil Cruz	135	471	62	94	18	3	20	61	38	64	.200	.378
Isiah Kiner-Falefa	119	401	40	106	20	2	1	35	15	17	.264	.332
Tommy Pham	120	392	44	96	17	1	10	52	5	50	.245	.370
Nick Gonzales	96	381	39	99	18	3	5	30	0	21	.260	.362
Ke'Bryan Hayes	100	369	34	87	10	2	2	36	10	18	.236	.290
Spencer Horwitz	108	364	55	99	26	0	11	51	0	44	.272	.434
Jared Triolo	107	331	41	75	18	2	7	24	13	39	.227	.356
Joey Bart	93	285	21	71	12	1	4	30	1	40	.249	.340
Henry Davis	87	252	25	42	7	0	7	22	2	18	.167	.278
Adam Frazier	78	235	22	60	10	0	3	21	7	17	.255	.336
Alexander Canario	87	216	25	47	6	1	6	20	3	17	.218	.338
Jack Suwinski	59	150	15	22	7	0	3	10	7	24	.147	.253
Enmanuel Valdez	31	91	7	19	4	2	2	12	0	11	.209	.363
Liover Peguero	33	80	9	16	1	0	4	8	4	6	.200	.363
Nick Yorke	22	69	7	16	3	0	1	8	1	3	.232	.319
Endy Rodríguez	18	52	5	9	4	0	0	2	0	5	.173	.250
Matt Gorski	15	41	2	8	0	1	2	4	0	1	.195	.390
Cam Devanney	14	36	1	5	1	0	0	1	0	2	.139	.167
Ronny Simon	8	30	4	7	1	0	0	2	1	1	.233	.267
Ji-Hwan Bae	13	20	4	1	0	0	0	0	4	5	.050	.050
Rafael Flores	17	15	0	3	2	0	0	0	0	2	.200	.333
Nick Solak	4	11	0	1	0	0	0	0	0	0	.091	.091
Tsung-Che Cheng	3	7	0	0	0	0	0	0	0	0	.000	.000
Billy Cook	3	6	1	2	0	0	0	0	0	0	.333	.333
Brett Sullivan	3	6	1	1	0	0	0	2	0	1	.167	.167
Totals	162	5375	583	1244	245	21	117	561	115	530	.231	.350

Source:Baseball Reference

=== Pitching ===
Note: W = Wins; L = Losses; ERA = Earned run average; G = Games pitched; GS = Games started; SV = Saves; IP = Innings pitched; H = Hits allowed; R = Runs allowed; ER = Earned runs allowed; BB = Walks allowed; SO = Strikeouts

Player	W	L	ERA	G	GS	SV	IP	H	R	ER	BB	SO
Paul Skenes	10	10	1.97	32	32	0	187.2	136	45	41	42	216
Mitch Keller	6	15	4.19	32	32	0	176.1	171	91	82	51	150
Andrew Heaney	5	10	5.39	26	23	0	120.1	125	74	72	39	84
Bailey Falter	7	5	3.73	22	22	0	113.1	95	53	47	39	70
Carmen Mlodzinski	5	8	3.55	34	12	0	99.0	102	42	39	27	89
Mike Burrows	2	4	3.94	23	19	0	96.0	88	43	42	31	97
Dennis Santana	4	5	2.18	70	0	16	70.1	44	18	17	17	60
Braxton Ashcraft	4	4	2.71	26	8	0	69.2	63	22	21	24	71
Isaac Mattson	3	3	2.45	44	0	0	47.2	35	14	13	19	45
Chase Shugart	4	3	3.40	35	0	0	45.0	33	18	17	17	31
Caleb Ferguson	2	2	3.74	45	0	0	43.1	33	18	18	14	34
Johan Oviedo	2	1	3.57	9	9	0	40.1	26	17	16	23	42
David Bednar	2	5	2.37	42	0	17	38.0	32	12	10	10	51
Kyle Nicolas	1	2	4.74	31	0	0	38.0	34	21	20	18	34
Yohan Ramírez	3	3	5.40	24	0	0	33.1	33	25	20	16	45
Bubba Chandler	4	1	4.02	7	4	1	31.1	25	14	14	4	31
Ryan Borucki	1	3	5.28	35	0	0	30.2	26	20	18	12	27
Joey Wentz	2	1	4.15	19	0	0	26.0	25	14	12	11	22
Colin Holderman	0	2	7.01	24	0	1	25.2	34	21	20	16	18
Justin Lawrence	1	0	0.51	17	0	0	17.2	9	1	1	8	23
Dauri Moreta	1	1	3.24	18	0	0	16.2	16	8	6	7	19
Evan Sisk	1	1	4.38	14	0	0	12.1	11	6	6	5	14
Génesis Cabrera	0	0	4.91	9	0	0	11.0	12	6	6	1	7
Tim Mayza	0	0	2.89	7	0	0	9.1	9	3	3	1	8
Thomas Harrington	0	1	15.58	3	1	1	8.2	18	15	15	7	7
Tanner Rainey	0	1	10.57	11	0	0	7.2	7	9	9	6	9
Cam Sanders	0	0	8.10	6	0	0	6.2	9	6	6	5	4
Hunter Barco	1	0	0.00	2	0	0	3.0	3	0	0	0	3
Hunter Stratton	0	0	23.63	3	0	0	2.2	10	7	7	2	1
Michael Darrell-Hicks	0	0	0.00	1	0	0	2.0	0	0	0	0	2
Jared Triolo	0	0	0.00	1	0	0	1.0	3	2	0	1	0
Total	71	91	3.76	162	162	36	1430.2	1267	645	598	473	1314

Source:Baseball Reference

== Farm system ==
Level	Team	League	Manager
Triple-A	Indianapolis Indians	International League	Chris Truby
Double-A	Altoona Curve	Eastern League	Andy Fox
High-A	Greensboro Grasshoppers	South Atlantic League	Blake Butler
Low-A	Bradenton Marauders	Florida State League	Jim Horner
Rookie	FCL Pirates	Florida Complex League	Jose Mendez
Rookie	DSL Pirates Black	Dominican Summer League	Joel Fuentes
Rookie	DSL Pirates Gold	Dominican Summer League	José Mosquera
