= Triolo =

Triolo may refer to:

== People ==
- Denise Carter-Triolo, also known as Denise Carter, American former tennis player
- Jared Triolo, American professional baseball player

== Places ==
- a torrent near San Severo in Italy
- Triolo Airfield, an abandoned field part of Foggia Airfield Complex
- a station situated on Line 1 of Lille metro in France
