= Adam Frazier =

American baseball player (born 1991)

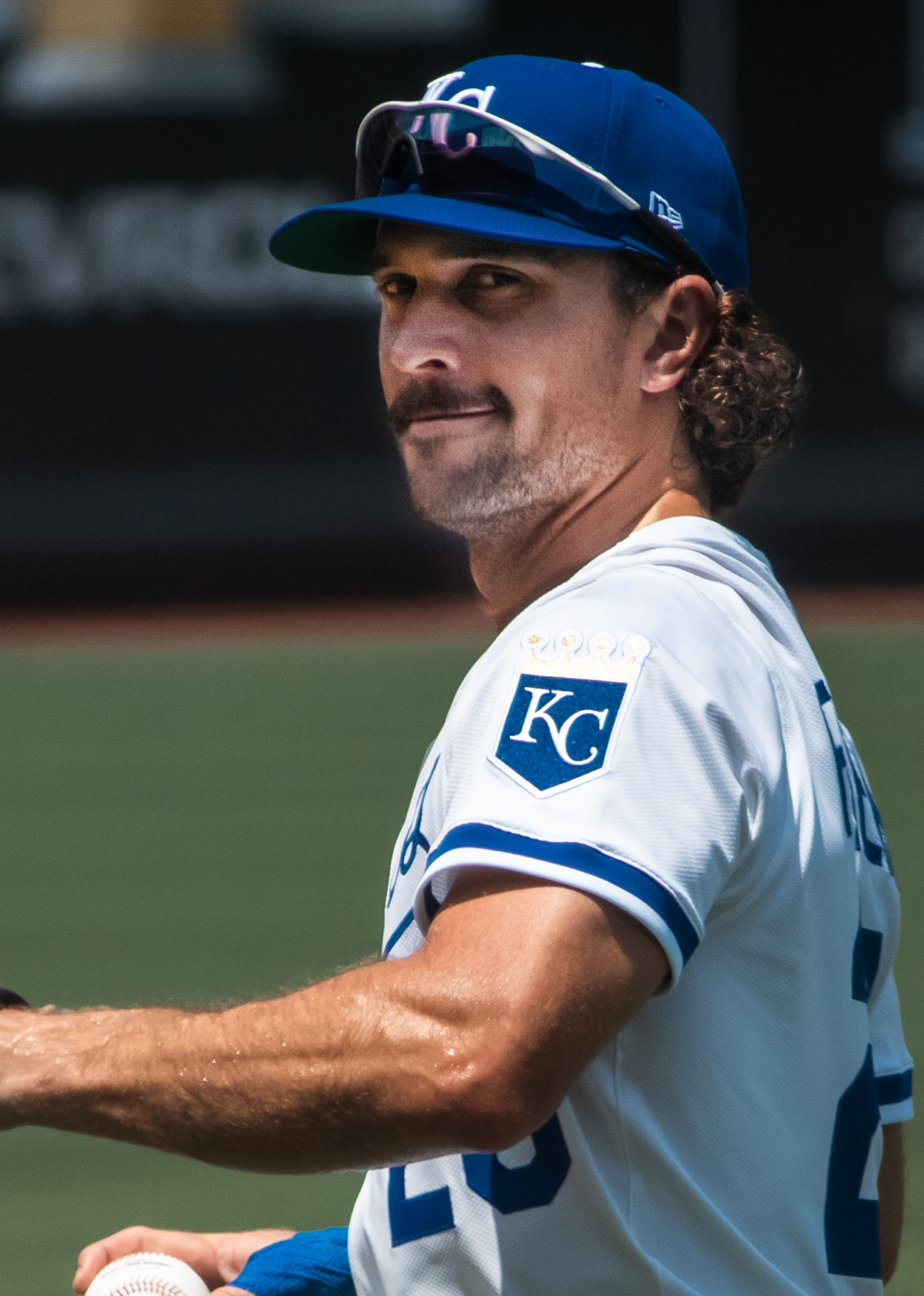
- Frazier with the Kansas City Royals in 2025

Free agent
- Second baseman / Outfielder
- Born: December 14, 1991 (age 34); Athens, Georgia, U.S.
- Bats: Left Throws: Right

MLB debut
- June 24, 2016, for the Pittsburgh Pirates

MLB statistics (through 2026 season)
- Batting average: .263
- Home runs: 68
- Runs batted in: 396
- Stats at Baseball Reference

Teams
- Pittsburgh Pirates (2016–2021); San Diego Padres (2021); Seattle Mariners (2022); Baltimore Orioles (2023); Kansas City Royals (2024); Pittsburgh Pirates (2025); Kansas City Royals (2025); Los Angeles Angels (2026)

Career highlights and awards
- All-Star (2021)
Medals
Men's baseball
Representing United States
WBSC Premier12
Silver medal – second place	2015 Tokyo	Team
Haarlem Baseball Week
Bronze medal – third place	2012	Team

Adam Timothy Frazier (born December 14, 1991) is an American professional baseball second baseman and outfielder who is a free agent. He has played in Major League Baseball (MLB) for the Pittsburgh Pirates, San Diego Padres, Seattle Mariners, Kansas City Royals, Baltimore Orioles, and Los Angeles Angels. Frazier played college baseball for the Mississippi State Bulldogs. He started the 2021 All-Star Game.

== Amateur career ==
Frazier attended Oconee County High School in Watkinsville, Georgia, graduating in 2010. While playing for the school's baseball team, Frazier hit 53 doubles, second-most in the history of the Georgia High School Association. His high school uniform number 11 was retired in 2018.

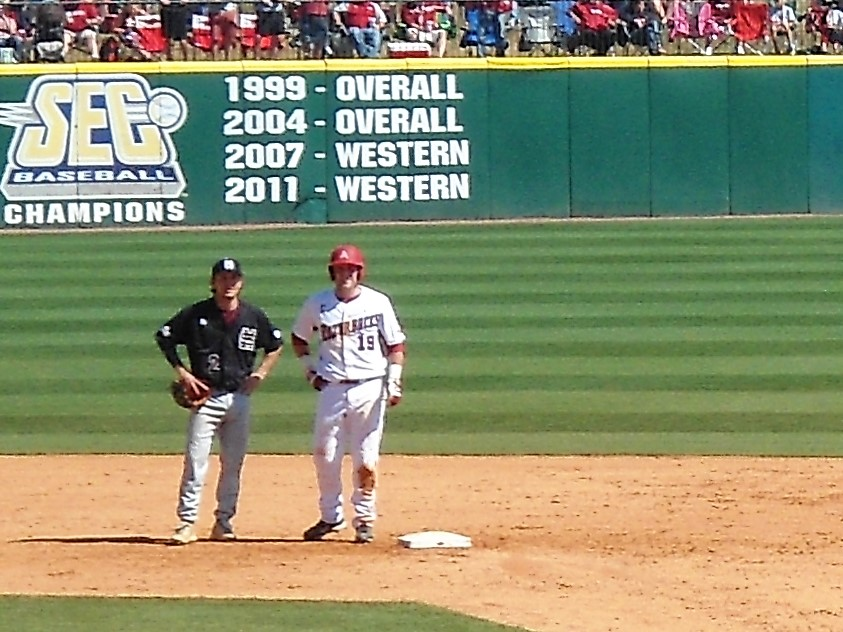
Frazier (left) with the Mississippi State Bulldogs

Frazier enrolled at Mississippi State University to play college baseball for the Mississippi State Bulldogs. He played sparingly as a freshman. In 2012, his sophomore year, Frazier set a school record for assists in a season (227), was named the most valuable player of the Southeastern Conference (SEC) tournament, and was chosen for the United States national collegiate team. In 2013, he led the National Collegiate Athletic Association with 107 hits, also a Bulldogs single-season record, while also topping his school records for assists (240) and setting records for putouts (120) in a season and putouts in a career (375). He was named to the SEC All-Tournament Team.

== Professional career ==
=== Pittsburgh Pirates (2013–2021) ===
==== Minor leagues (2013–2015) ====
The Pittsburgh Pirates selected Frazier in the sixth round, with the 179th overall selection of the 2013 MLB draft. He signed, receiving a $240,600 signing bonus, and was assigned to the Jamestown Jammers of the Low-A New York–Penn League. In 58 games, he slashed .321/.399/.362 with 27 RBIs. In 2014, he played for the Bradenton Marauders of the High-A Florida State League, with a .252 batting average, one home run, and 42 RBIs in 121 games.

In 2015, Frazier played for the Double-A Altoona Curve, leading the Eastern League with a .324 batting average, along with two home runs and 30 RBIs in 103 games. After the season, He played for the Glendale Desert Dogs of the Arizona Fall League and the U.S. national team in the WBSC Premier12. He was named to the All-Premier12 Team as a second baseman.

==== Major leagues (2016–2021) ====
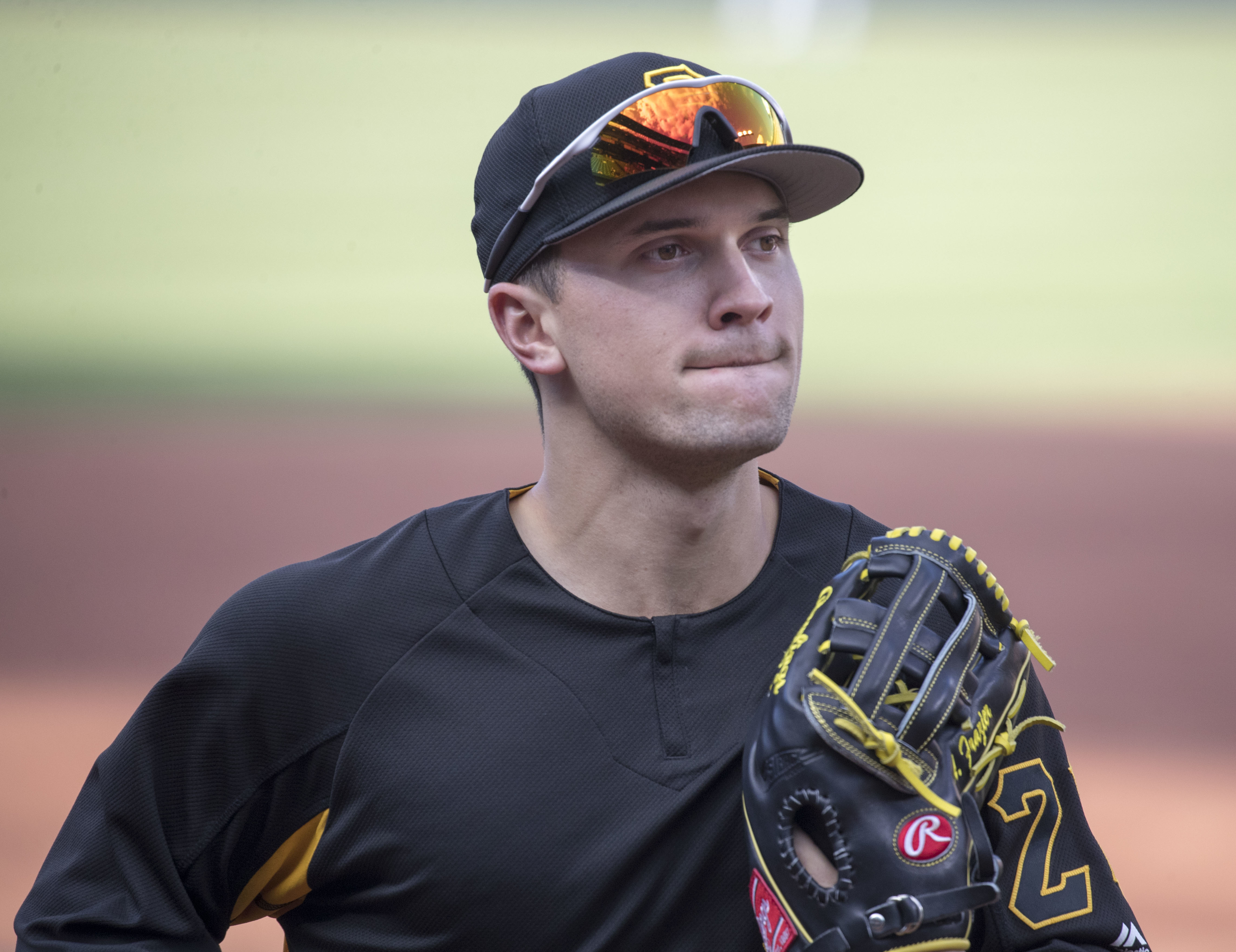
Frazier with the Pittsburgh Pirates in 2017

In 2016, the Pirates invited Frazier to spring training. He started the season with the Indianapolis Indians of the Triple-A International League. On June 24, the Pirates promoted him to the MLB. He made his MLB debut the same day against the Los Angeles Dodgers, recording his first MLB hit. In 68 games for Indianapolis prior to his promotion, he was slashing .333/.401/.425 with 22 RBIs. He spent the rest of the season with Pittsburgh aside from six days spent with the Bristol Pirates at the end of August and beginning of September, though he did not play a game for Bristol. In 66 games for Pittsburgh, Frazier batted .301 with two home runs and 11 RBIs.

In 2017, Frazier's first full season in Pittsburgh, he batted .276 with six home runs and 53 RBIs over 121 games. In 2018, he played in 113 games with the Pirates, hitting .277 with ten home runs and 35 RBIs. Frazier was the National League (NL) Player of the Week for July 1–7, 2019, after hitting .600 with 7 doubles. In 2019, he slashed .278/.336/.417 with 10 home runs and 50 RBIs over 152 games. He ranked second among NL second basemen with a .989 fielding percentage. Following the season, he was nominated for a Gold Glove Award. In the COVID-19-shortened 2020 season, Frazier had a career-low slash line of .230/.297/.364 in 58 games.

Batting .328 with four home runs and 22 doubles, Frazier was named the NL's starting second baseman at the 2021 MLB All-Star Game in Denver. In 98 games for the Pirates to start 2021, Frazier slashed .324/.388/.448 with a league-leading 125 hits at the time of his trade.

=== San Diego Padres (2021) ===
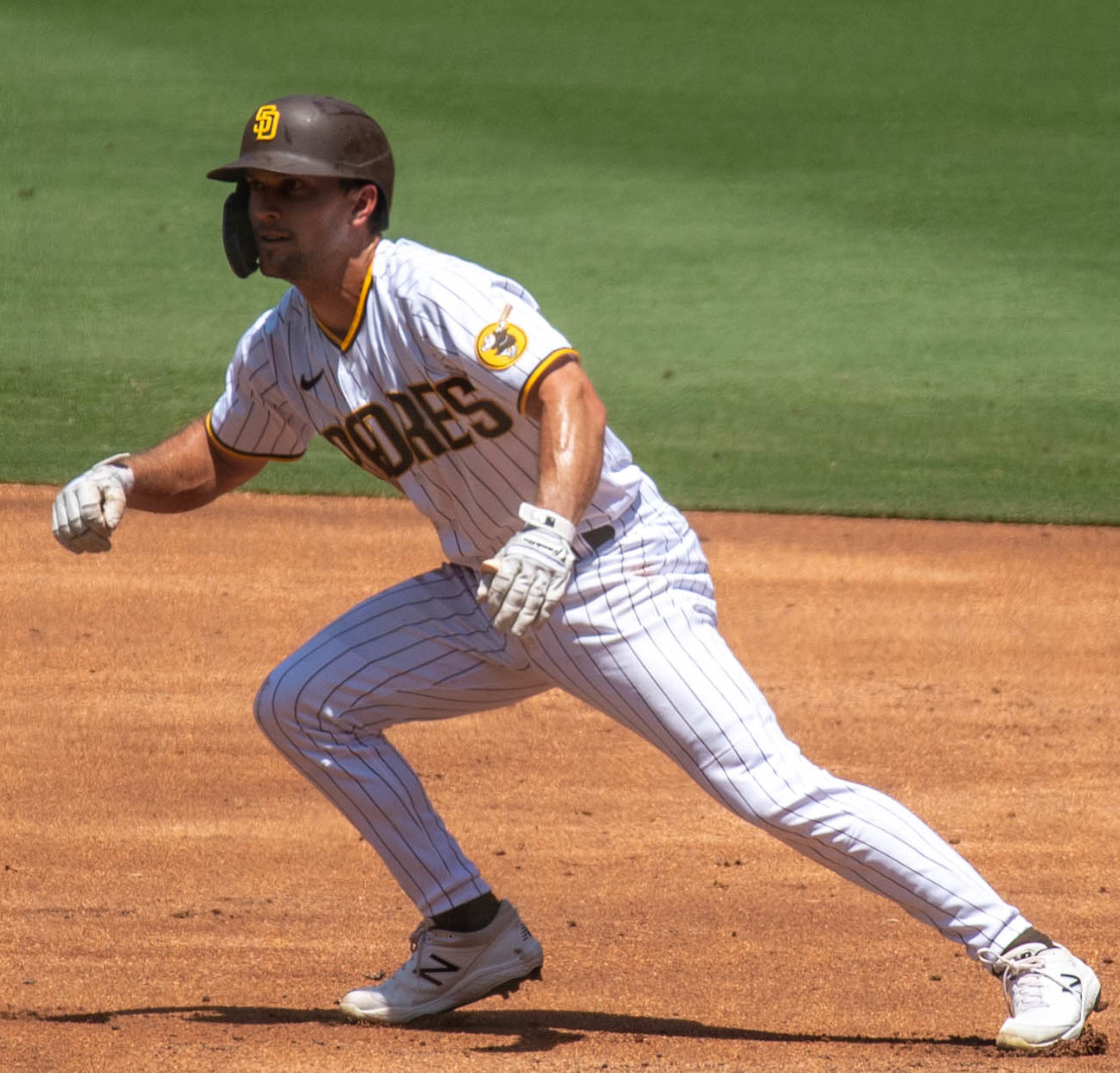
Frazier with the San Diego Padres in 2021

On July 25, 2021, the Pirates traded Frazier to the San Diego Padres, along with $1.4 million for infielder Tucupita Marcano, outfielder Jack Suwinski, and pitcher Michell Miliano. For both the Padres and Pirates, he batted .305/.368/.411 and led the majors in line drive percentage, at 29.4%.

=== Seattle Mariners (2022) ===
On November 27, 2021, the Padres traded Frazier to the Seattle Mariners for pitcher Ray Kerr and outfielder Corey Rosier. Frazier set career-highs by playing in 156 games and stealing 11 bases in 2022, but his other offensive statistics declined from the previous year, as he batted .238/.301/.311. In addition to 124 games at second base, he also played shortstop and all three outfield positions. He had five hits with one double, three runs scored, one RBI and one walk in five games with the Mariners in his postseason debut. He became a free agent on November 6.

=== Baltimore Orioles (2023) ===
Frazier signed a one-year, $8 million contract with the Baltimore Orioles on December 15, 2022. In 141 games, Frazier hit .240/.300/.396 with 13 home runs and 36 RBI. He also appeared in both American League (AL) Division Series against the Texas Rangers, failing to get a hit across five at-bats as the Orioles were swept. He became a free agent following the season.

=== Kansas City Royals (2024) ===
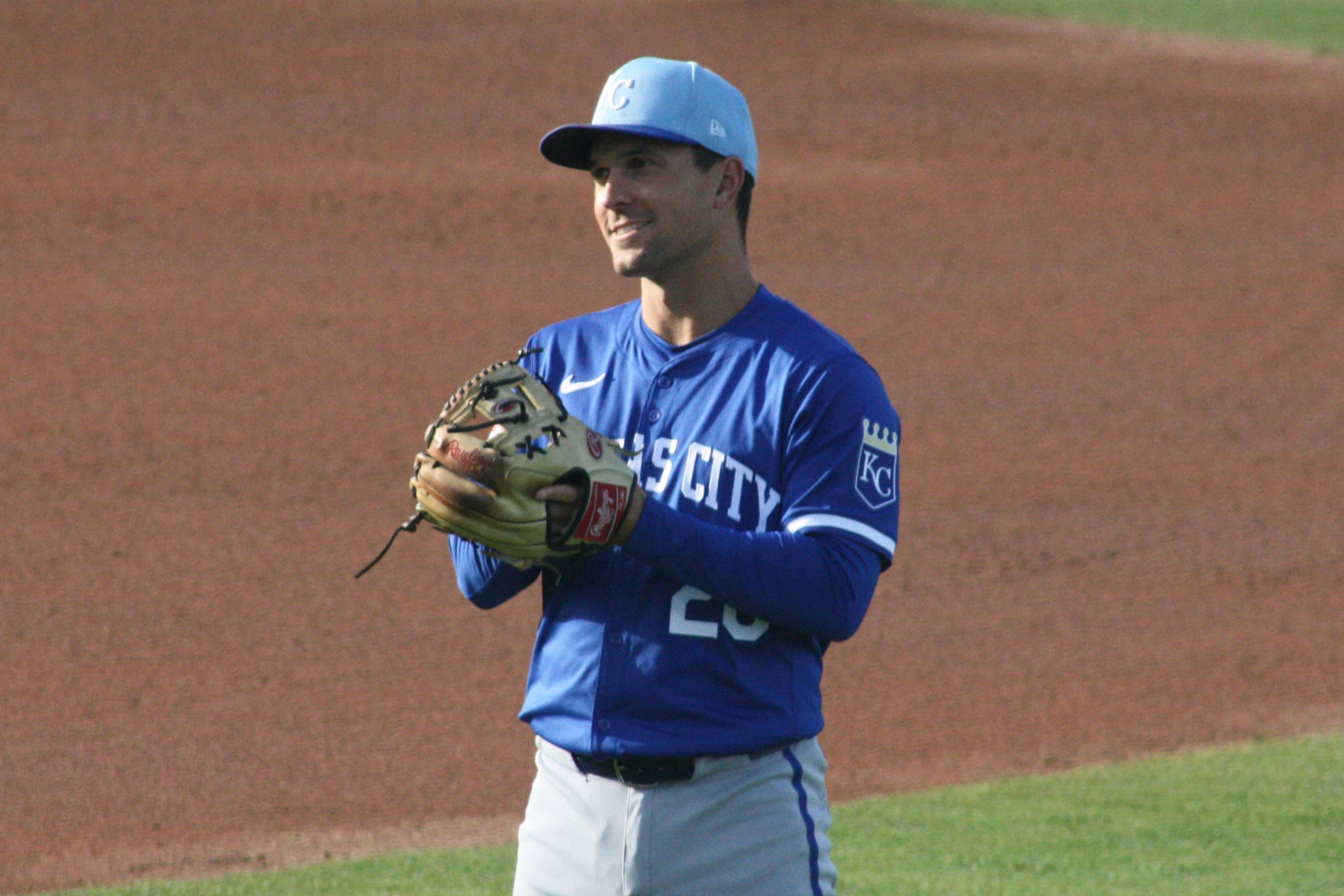
Frazier with the 2024 Royals

On January 30, 2024, Frazier signed a one-year, $4.5 million contract with a mutual option for the 2025 season with the Kansas City Royals. In 104 games for Kansas City. Frazier batted .202/.282/.294 with four home runs, 22 RBI, and three stolen bases. On October 31, the Royals declined their side of the mutual option, making him a free agent.

=== Pittsburgh Pirates (2025) ===
On January 29, 2025, Frazier signed a one-year, $1.525 million contract with the Pittsburgh Pirates. In 78 appearances for Pittsburgh, Frazier batted .255/.318/.336 with three home runs, 21 RBI, and seven stolen bases.

=== Kansas City Royals (2025) ===
On July 16, 2025, Frazier was traded back to the Kansas City Royals in exchange for Cam Devanney. He made 56 appearances for Kansas City, batting .283/.320/.402 with four home runs and 23 RBI. Frazier became a free agent after the season.

=== Los Angeles Angels (2026–present) ===
On February 16, 2026, Frazier signed a minor league contract with the Los Angeles Angels. On March 24, the Angels selected Frazier's contract after he made the team's Opening Day roster.

== Personal life ==
Frazier proposed to his girlfriend in 2020.
