= Evan Sisk =

American baseball player (born 1997)

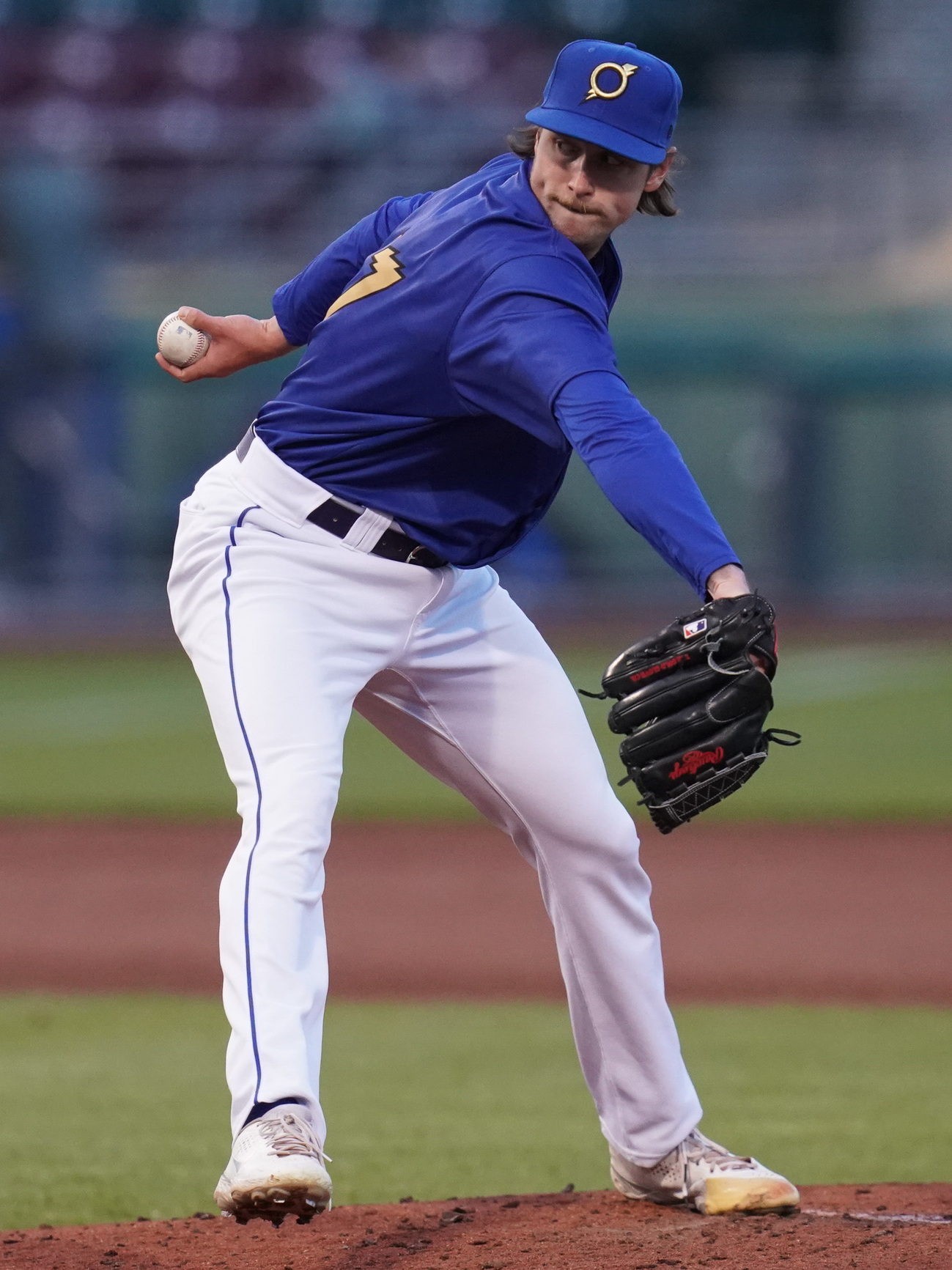
- Sisk with the Omaha Storm Chasers in 2023

Pittsburgh Pirates – No. 48
- Pitcher
- Born: April 23, 1997 (age 29); Chester, South Carolina, U.S.
- Bats: Left Throws: Left

MLB debut
- April 15, 2025, for the Kansas City Royals

MLB statistics (through 2026 season)
- Win–loss record: 2–1
- Earned run average: 3.18
- Strikeouts: 75
- Stats at Baseball Reference

Teams
- Kansas City Royals (2025); Pittsburgh Pirates (2025–present)

Samuel Evan Sisk (born April 23, 1997) is an American professional baseball pitcher for the Pittsburgh Pirates of Major League Baseball (MLB). He has previously played in MLB for the Kansas City Royals.

== Amateur career ==
Sisk attended Lewisville High School in Richburg, South Carolina and played college baseball at the College of Charleston. As a junior in 2018, he went 10–3 with a 2.96 ERA over 91 1/3 innings.

== Professional career ==
=== St. Louis Cardinals ===
After his junior season, Sisk was selected by the St. Louis Cardinals in the 16th round, with the 483rd overall pick, of the 2018 Major League Baseball draft. Sisk signed with the Cardinals and made his professional debut with the Rookie-level Johnson City Cardinals, posting a 1.76 ERA over 30 2/3 innings. He spent the 2019 season with the Single-A Peoria Chiefs where he went 3–6 with a 3.25 ERA over 61 innings pitched in relief. Sisk did not play a game in 2020 due to the cancellation of the minor league season because of the COVID-19 pandemic. He opened the 2021 season with Peoria (now members of High-A) and was promoted to the Double-A Springfield Cardinals during the season.

=== Minnesota Twins ===
On July 30, 2021, the Cardinals traded Sisk and John Gant to the Minnesota Twins in exchange for J.A. Happ and cash. He was assigned to the Double-A Wichita Wind Surge where he finished the season. Over 39 relief appearances between Peoria, Springfield and Wichita, Sisk went 3–1 with a 3.91 ERA and 69 strikeouts over 53 innings. After the season, he played in the Arizona Fall League for the Scottsdale Scorpions. He opened the 2022 season with Wichita and was promoted to the Triple-A St. Paul Saints in mid-June. Over fifty relief appearances between the two teams, he went 5–1 with a 1.57 ERA and 76 strikeouts over 63 innings.

=== Kansas City Royals ===
On January 23, 2023, Sisk was traded to the Kansas City Royals alongside Steven Cruz in exchange for Michael A. Taylor. He was assigned to the Triple-A Omaha Storm Chasers for the 2023 season. Over 58 appearances, Sisk went 2–4 with a 6.34 ERA and 62 strikeouts over 61 innings.

In 2024, Sisk made 58 appearances for Omaha, compiling a 6–2 record and 1.57 ERA with 81 strikeouts and 15 saves across 57 1/3 innings pitched. On November 1, 2024, the Royals added Sisk to their 40-man roster to prevent him from reaching minor league free agency.

Sisk was optioned to Omaha to begin the 2025 season. On April 13, 2025, Sisk was promoted to the major leagues for the first time. He made his MLB debut on April 15 at Yankee Stadium, pitching one scoreless inning in which he gave up one walk, one hit, and acquired all three outs via strikeout. Sisk made five appearances for the Royals, recording a 1.69 ERA with 11 strikeouts across 5 1/3 innings pitched.

=== Pittsburgh Pirates ===
On July 31, 2025, Sisk and Callan Moss were traded to the Pittsburgh Pirates in exchange for pitcher Bailey Falter. The Pirates assigned him to the Triple-A Indianapolis Indians, and recalled him to the major leagues for the first time on August 15. On August 18, Sisk recorded his first career win, pitching a scoreless inning of relief against the Toronto Blue Jays. Sisk made 14 appearances for Pittsburgh in 2025, compiling a 1–1 record and 4.38 ERA with a 14/5 (2.8) strikeout-to-walk ratio across 12 1/3 innings pitched.

Sisk was optioned to Indianapolis to begin the 2026 season. He was recalled to the Pirates for the first time on April 13, and continued to be recalled and optioned throughout the season. He missed the month of July while dealing with left elbow inflammation. Sisk made 41 relief appearances for the Pirates during the season and had a 1–0 record, a 3.02 ERA, and 50 strikeouts over 44 2/3 innings.
