= Hunter Barco =

American baseball player (born 2000)

Pittsburgh Pirates – No. 45
- Pitcher
- Born: December 15, 2000 (age 25); Jacksonville, Florida, U.S.
- Bats: Left Throws: Left

MLB debut
- September 23, 2025, for the Pittsburgh Pirates

MLB statistics (through 2026 season)
- Win–loss record: 1–1
- Earned run average: 6.53
- Strikeouts: 17
- Stats at Baseball Reference

Teams
- Pittsburgh Pirates (2025–present)

Hunter Harkins Barco (born December 15, 2000) is an American professional baseball pitcher for the Pittsburgh Pirates of Major League Baseball (MLB).

== Amateur career ==
Barco attended The Bolles School in Jacksonville, Florida, where he began playing varsity baseball in the eighth grade. He committed to play college baseball at the University of Virginia when he was 14, but later switched his commitment to the University of Florida for the Gators. He posted a 12–0 record and 0.53 ERA as a freshman and was named The Florida Times-Union Player of the Year. Barco then pitched to a 1.84 ERA as a sophomore, a 1.98 ERA as a junior, and a 5–0 record with a 1.84 ERA as a senior in 2019. During the summer of 2018, he played in the Under Armour All-America Baseball Game at Wrigley Field. He ended his high school career with a 35–4 record, a 1.53 ERA and 336 strikeouts alongside a .299 batting average and 13 home runs. He was considered a top prospect for the 2019 Major League Baseball draft, but was not selected until the 24th round by the New York Mets and did not sign due to his strong college commitment.

In 2020, Barco's freshman year at Florida, he pitched 19 1/3 innings in which he went 2–0 with a 1.40 ERA and 26 strikeouts before the remainder of the season was cancelled due to the COVID-19 pandemic. He spent that summer playing in the Texas Collegiate League for the Tulsa Drillers. In 2021, Barco started 16 games for the Gators and went 10–3 with a 4.01 ERA, 94 strikeouts, and 26 walks across 83 innings. Following the season's end, he was selected to play for the USA Baseball Collegiate National Team. Barco was named Florida's Opening Day starter for the 2022 season, striking out 11 batters over six innings in a 7-2 win over the Liberty Flames. He was subsequently named the SEC Pitcher of the Week. In mid-April, Barco was shut down indefinitely with elbow discomfort. A few weeks later, it was announced that he would be undergoing Tommy John surgery and would miss the remainder of the season. Over nine starts for the season, Barco went 5–2 with a 2.50 ERA, 69 strikeouts, and 11 walks over 50 1/3 innings.

== Professional career ==
The Pittsburgh Pirates selected Barco with the 44th overall selection in the 2022 Major League Baseball draft. He signed with the team for $1.5 million.

Barco made his professional debut in the 2023 with the Rookie-league Florida Complex League Pirates. He was later promoted to the Single-A Bradenton Marauders. Over 18 1/3 innings pitched for the season, Barco went 0–2 with a 3.44 ERA and 28 strikeouts. He split the 2024 campaign between the High-A Greensboro Grasshoppers and Double-A Altoona Curve. In 18 games (16 starts) for the two affiliates, he accumulated a 4–2 record and 3.27 ERA with 83 strikeouts across 66 innings of work. Barco's season ended on July 28, after he suffered a stress fracture in his leg.

Barco was assigned to Altoona to open the 2025 season, and opened the season pitching 25 2/3 scoreless innings. In early May, he was promoted to the Triple-A Indianapolis Indians. Over 27 games (23 starts) between the two teams, Barco went 4–1 with a 2.81 ERA and 116 strikeouts over 99 1/3 innings pitched.

On September 23, 2025, the Pirates selected Barco's contract from Indianapolis, calling him up to the major leagues. He made his MLB debut the same day against the Cincinnati Reds, pitching one inning and being accredited with the win, the first Pirates left-handed reliever to win their debut since Frank Carpin in 1965. He pitched a total of three innings for the Pirates during the 2025 season and gave up no runs, no walks, and recorded three strikeouts.

To begin the 2026 season, Barco was named to Pittsburgh's Opening Day roster as a reliever. He was optioned to Indianapolis on April 13, and was subsequently recalled and optioned by the Pirates multiple times during the season. With the Pirates, Barco made seven relief appearances and had a 0–1 record, a 7.64 ERA, 14 strikeouts, and 13 walks over 17 2/3 innings. He also pitched in 21 games for Indianapolis with whom he had a 4–8 record, a 3.79 ERA, and 80 strikeouts across 78 1/3 innings.

== Personal life ==
Barco's father, Barry, was a placekicker for the Florida State Seminoles football team from 1983 through 1985.
