= Cam Devanney =

American baseball player (born 1997)

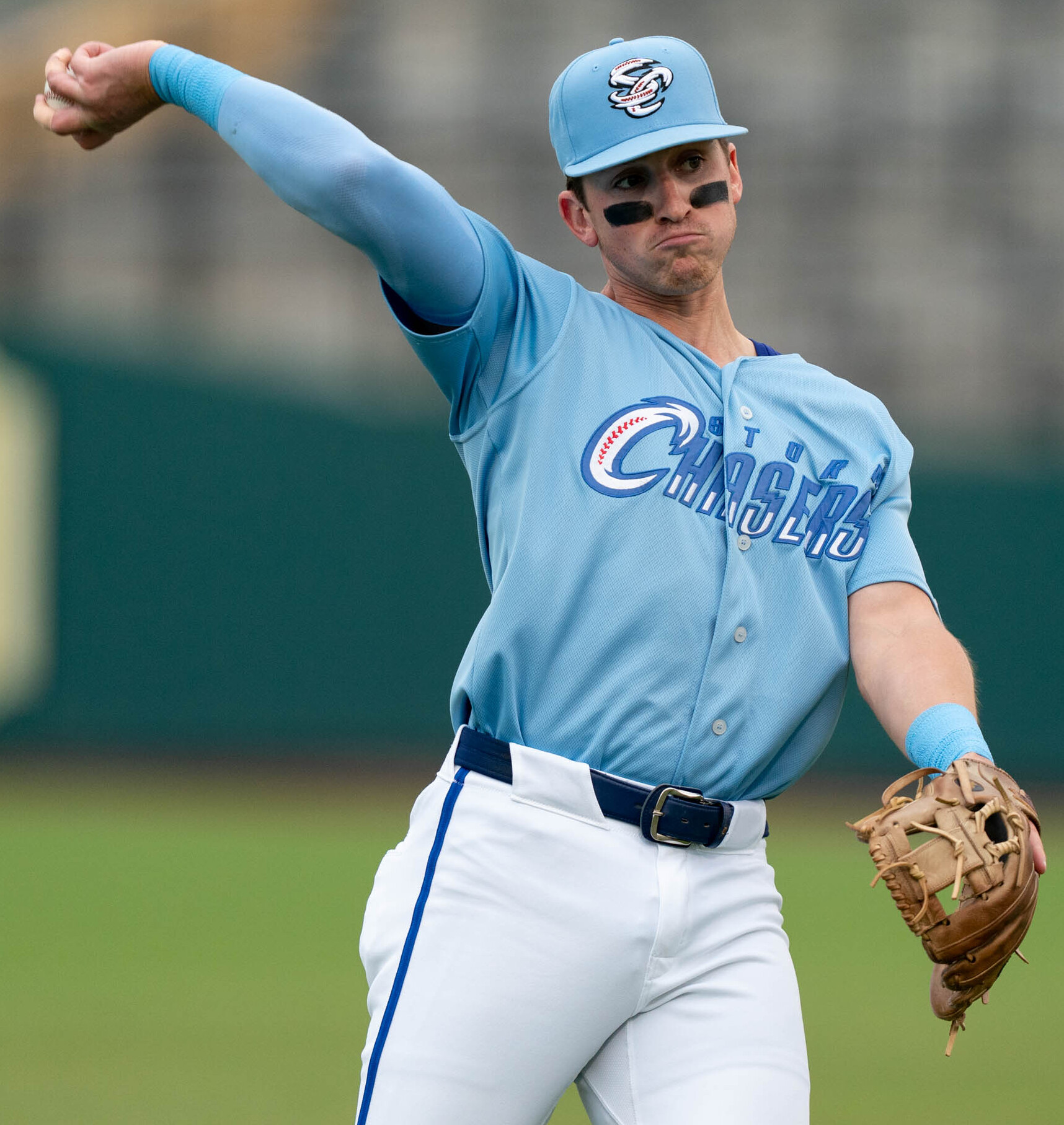
- Devanney with the Omaha Storm Chasers in 2025

Free agent
- Infielder
- Born: April 13, 1997 (age 29); Nashua, New Hampshire, U.S.
- Bats: Right Throws: Right

Professional debut
- MLB: August 31, 2025, for the Pittsburgh Pirates
- NPB: May 27, 2026, for the Hanshin Tigers

MLB statistics (through 2025 season)
- Batting average: .139
- Home runs: 0
- Runs batted in: 1

NPB statistics (through 2026 season)
- Batting average: .071
- Home runs: 0
- Runs batted in: 0
- Stats at Baseball Reference

Teams
- Pittsburgh Pirates (2025); Hanshin Tigers (2026)
Medals
Men's baseball
Representing United States
WBSC Premier12
Bronze medal – third place	2024 Tokyo	Team

Cameron Michael Devanney (/dɛˈveɪniː/ deh-VAY-nee; born April 13, 1997) is an American professional baseball infielder who is a free agent. He has previously played in Major League Baseball (MLB) for the Pittsburgh Pirates and in Nippon Professional Baseball (NPB) for the Hanshin Tigers.

== Career ==
=== Milwaukee Brewers ===
Devanney attended Central Catholic High School in Lawrence, Massachusetts, and Elon University, where he played college baseball for the Elon Phoenix. He was selected by the Milwaukee Brewers in the 15th round (463rd overall) of the 2019 Major League Baseball draft. Devanney began his professional career that season with the Rookie Arizona League Brewers and Rocky Mountain Vibes primarily as a shortstop. He did not play in a game in 2020 due to the cancellation of the minor league season because of the COVID-19 pandemic. In 2021, Devanney played the entire season with the Double-A Biloxi Shuckers. Most of his time was spent as second baseman, with significant time at third base, as well as a few games at short. He began the 2022 season at Double-A but was promoted to the Triple-A Nashville Sounds in September. He moved back to shortstop as his primary position, but also saw lots of playing time at third. After the season, he was selected as an MiLB.com Organization All-Star. He began the 2023 campaign with Nashville.

=== Kansas City Royals ===
On December 14, 2023, the Brewers traded Devanney to the Kansas City Royals alongside Ryan Brady in exchange for Taylor Clarke. In 136 appearances for the Triple-A Omaha Storm Chasers in 2024, he slashed .254/.336/.445 with 19 home runs and 77 RBI.

Devanney began the 2025 season with Triple-A Omaha, hitting .272/.366/.565 with 18 home runs and 55 RBI over 69 games. On July 8, 2025, Devanney was selected to the 40-man roster and promoted to the major leagues for the first time. However, he did not make an appearance for the Royals across eight days on the active roster.

=== Pittsburgh Pirates ===
On July 16, 2025, Devanney was traded to the Pittsburgh Pirates in exchange for Adam Frazier; he was subsequently optioned to the Triple-A Indianapolis Indians, becoming a phantom ballplayer. On August 30, the Pirates promoted Devanney to the major leagues. He made his major league debut on August 31. Devanney made 14 appearances for Pittsburgh during his rookie campaign, going 5-for-36 (.139) with one double and two walks. Devanney was released by the Pirates on November 16.

=== Hanshin Tigers ===
On November 16, 2025, Devanney signed with the Hanshin Tigers of Nippon Professional Baseball. He became a free agent following the season.
