= Thomas Harrington (baseball) =

American baseball player (born 2001)

Pittsburgh Pirates – No. 53
- Pitcher
- Born: July 12, 2001 (age 25); Sanford, North Carolina, U.S.
- Bats: Right Throws: Right

MLB debut
- April 1, 2025, for the Pittsburgh Pirates

MLB statistics (through 2025 season)
- Win–loss record: 0–1
- Earned run average: 15.58
- Strikeouts: 7
- Stats at Baseball Reference

Teams
- Pittsburgh Pirates (2025)

Thomas Hinson Harrington (born July 12, 2001) is an American professional baseball pitcher for the Pittsburgh Pirates of Major League Baseball (MLB). He played college baseball for the Campbell Fighting Camels.

== Amateur career ==
Harrington grew up in Sanford, North Carolina and attended Southern Lee High School. He went 4–0 with a 0.32 ERA and 54 strikeouts over 43 2/3 innings pitched as a junior. Harrington made one start before his senior season was canceled due to COVID-19. Harrington was also the starting quarterback on Southern Lee's football team.

Harrington joined the Campbell baseball team as a walk-on. He made 16 appearances with 14 starts as a freshman and was named the Big South Conference Freshman of the Year after going 6–3 with a 3.45 ERA. He was named the Big South Pitcher of the Year as a sophomore.

== Professional career ==
The Pittsburgh Pirates selected Harrington 36th overall in the 2022 Major League Baseball draft. He signed with the Pirates on July 22, 2022, and received a $2,050,000 signing bonus. Harrington made his professional debut in 2023, splitting the year between the Single-A Bradenton Marauders and High-A Greensboro Grasshoppers. In 26 total starts, he accumulated a 7–6 record and 3.53 ERA with 146 strikeouts across 127 1/3 innings pitched.

Harrington missed the first five weeks of the 2024 campaign due to a rotator cuff strain. After returning, he pitched for the Triple-A Indianapolis Indians, Double-A Altoona Curve, and Greensboro. In 22 appearances (21 starts) split between the three affiliates, Harrington compiled a 7–3 record and 2.61 ERA with 115 strikeouts across 117 1/3 innings pitched.

On April 1, 2025, it was announced that Harrington would be selected to the 40-man roster and promoted to the major leagues for the first time. He made three appearances (one start) for the Pirates during his rookie campaign, but struggled to an 0-1 record and 15.58 ERA with seven strikeouts and one save across 8 2/3 innings pitched.

Harrington was optioned to Triple-A Indianapolis to begin the 2026 season.
