= Chase Shugart =

American baseball player (born 1996)

Philadelphia Phillies – No. 55
- Pitcher
- Born: October 24, 1996 (age 29); Bridge City, Texas, U.S.
- Bats: Left Throws: Right

MLB debut
- August 15, 2024, for the Boston Red Sox

MLB statistics (through 2026 season)
- Win–loss record: 6–4
- Earned run average: 3.77
- Strikeouts: 98
- Stats at Baseball Reference

Teams
- Boston Red Sox (2024); Pittsburgh Pirates (2025); Philadelphia Phillies (2026–present)

Chase C. Shugart (born October 24, 1996) is an American professional baseball pitcher for the Philadelphia Phillies of Major League Baseball (MLB). He has previously played in MLB for the Boston Red Sox and Pittsburgh Pirates.

== Amateur career ==
Shugart attended Bridge City High School in Bridge City, Texas, where he played football and baseball. As a junior in 2014, he compiled a 10–1 win–loss record and a 1.64 earned run average (ERA) with 127 strikeouts in 72 2/3 innings pitched, and in 2015, as a senior, he was 10–2 with a 0.67 ERA and, as a batter, had a .544 batting average with nine home runs and 27 runs batted in (RBIs). Shugart was not selected in the 2015 MLB draft, and he enrolled at the University of Texas to play college baseball for the Texas Longhorns.

As a freshman at Texas in 2016, Shugart made 32 appearances, all in relief, and pitched to a 2–3 record and 4.53 ERA. In 2017, as a sophomore, he was 3–2 with a 3.43 ERA and 1.45 WHIP in 42 innings pitched out of the bullpen. After the season, he pitched for the Cotuit Kettleers of the Cape Cod Baseball League. Shugart transitioned from a reliever to a starting pitcher as a junior in 2018. He pitched for Texas in the 2018 College World Series until the Longhorns were eliminated by the Florida Gators on June 19. He finished his junior year with a 5–3 record and a 4.36 ERA in 84 2/3 innings pitched.

== Professional career ==
=== Boston Red Sox ===
On June 6, 2018, Shugart was selected by the Boston Red Sox of Major League Baseball (MLB) in the 12th round of the 2018 MLB draft, with the 370th overall pick. On June 22, Shugart announced via Twitter that he would forego his final year at Texas in order to sign with the Red Sox. He signed with Boston on July 6, and first pitched in mid-August for the Rookie-level Gulf Coast League Red Sox, where he made three appearances with a 1.80 ERA in five innings of work. In late August, he was assigned to the Lowell Spinners of the Low–A New York-Penn League, with whom he made one scoreless appearance.

On March 22, 2019, MLB suspended Shugart for fifty games after a second positive test for a drug of abuse. Shugart subsequently made his first appearance of the 2019 season on May 27 with the Greenville Drive of the Single-A South Atlantic League, spending the remainder of the year there. Over 16 starts, Shugart went 6–4 with a 2.81 ERA, striking out 73 over 89 2/3 innings. After the 2020 minor league season was cancelled due to the COVID-19 pandemic, Shugart was invited to participate in the Red Sox' fall instructional league. For the 2021 season, Shugart returned to Greenville, now members of the High-A East, started 22 games and pitched to a 6–6 record, a 4.78 ERA, and 93 strikeouts over 105 1/3 innings. He opened the 2022 season with the Portland Sea Dogs of the Double-A Eastern League and moved into the bullpen. In early July, he was promoted to the Worcester Red Sox of the Triple-A International League. On August 4, he pitched two innings of a combined no-hitter alongside Michael Wacha and Andrew Politi versus the Durham Bulls. Over 45 games (one start) between the two affiliates, Shugart went 5–5 with a 5.31 ERA and 63 strikeouts over 62 2/3 innings.

Shugart spent the entirety of the 2023 season with Triple–A Worcester. In 40 appearances with the club, he struggled to an 8.22 ERA with 39 strikeouts and 4 saves over 46 innings pitched. He returned to Worcester to begin the 2024 campaign.

On August 12, 2024, Shugart was selected to the 40-man roster and promoted to the major leagues for the first time. In six games for Boston, he had a 4.15 ERA with eight strikeouts and one save across 8 2/3 innings pitched. Shugart was designated for assignment following the acquisition of Blake Sabol on January 15, 2025.

=== Pittsburgh Pirates ===
On January 17, 2025, Shugart was traded to the Pittsburgh Pirates in exchange for Matt McShane. He was optioned to the Triple-A Indianapolis Indians to begin the season. On April 22, Shugart recorded his first career win after tossing two scoreless innings against the Los Angeles Angels. In 35 appearances for Pittsburgh, he compiled a 4-3 record and 3.40 ERA with 31 strikeouts over 45 innings of work. On January 8, 2026, Shugart was designated for assignment following the signing of Ryan O'Hearn.

=== Philadelphia Phillies ===
On January 13, 2026, Shugart was traded to the Philadelphia Phillies in exchange for Francisco Loreto. He was optioned to the Triple-A Lehigh Valley IronPigs to begin the 2026 season.

Shugart was called up to the Phillies on April 14. In a doubleheader against the San Francisco Giants on April 30, he accomplished the rare feat of recording the win in both games, becoming the first pitcher to do so since 2013. Shugart was optioned back to Lehigh Valley on June 30 and recalled by the Phillies on July 9. He made a total of 46 relief appearances for the Phillies and had a 2–1 record with a 4.02 ERA and 59 strikeouts over 53 2/3 innings.
