= Bailey Falter =

American baseball player (born 1997)

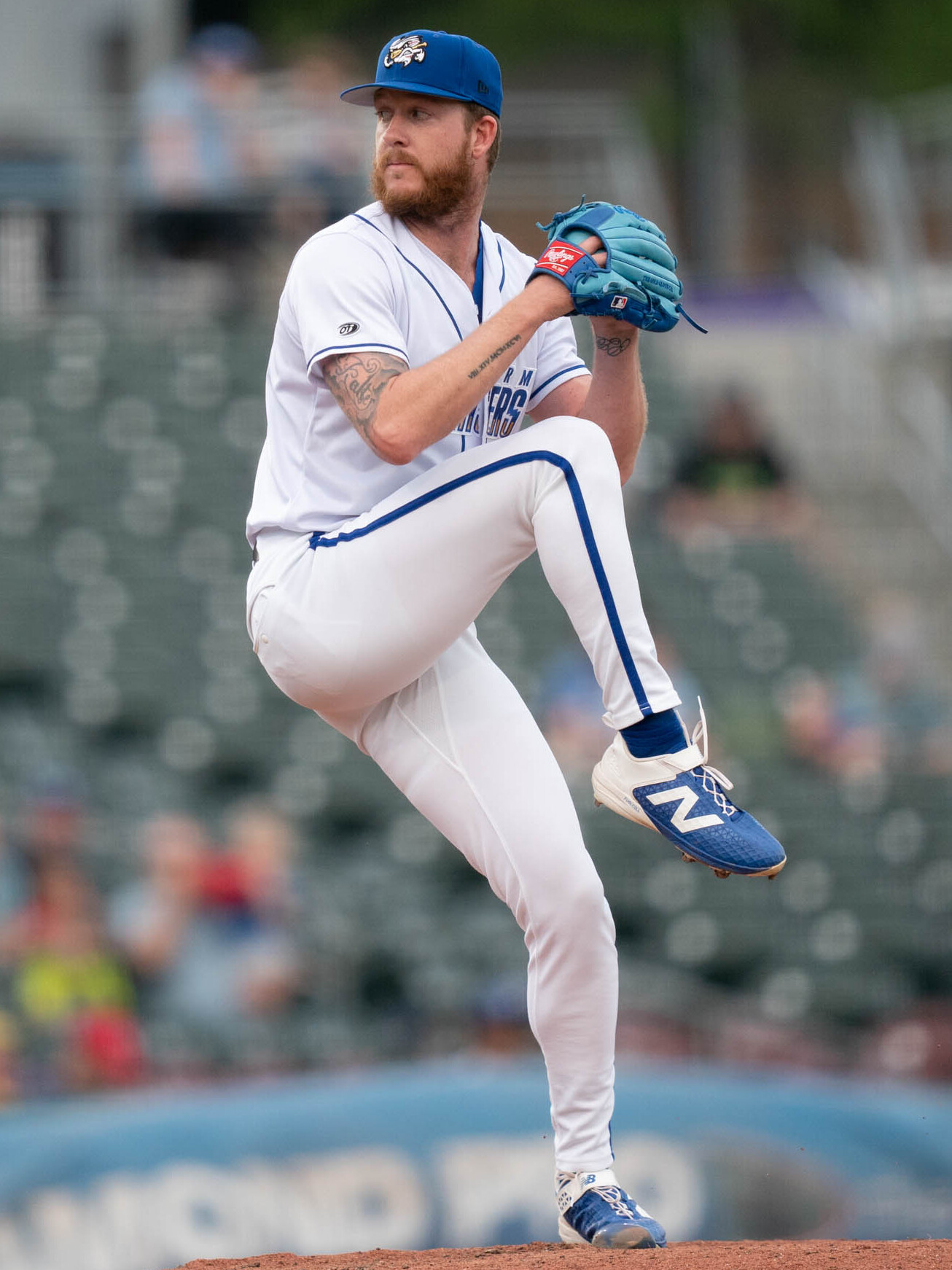
- Falter with the Omaha Storm Chasers in 2026

Free agent
- Pitcher
- Born: April 24, 1997 (age 29); Chino Hills, California, U.S.
- Bats: Right Throws: Left

MLB debut
- April 25, 2021, for the Philadelphia Phillies

MLB statistics (through 2026 season)
- Win–loss record: 25–32
- Earned run average: 4.73
- Strikeouts: 354
- Stats at Baseball Reference

Teams
- Philadelphia Phillies (2021–2023); Pittsburgh Pirates (2023–2025); Kansas City Royals (2025–2026); Atlanta Braves (2026)

Bailey Falter (born April 24, 1997) is an American professional baseball pitcher who is a free agent. He has previously played in Major League Baseball (MLB) for the Philadelphia Phillies, Pittsburgh Pirates, Kansas City Royals, and Atlanta Braves.

Born in Chino Hills, California, Falter grew up idolizing pitcher Sandy Koufax. He attended Chino Hills High School, pitching a no-hitter for their baseball team in 2013. The Phillies selected Falter in the fifth round of the 2015 MLB draft, and he signed with the team that year. His rise through the Phillies' farm system was disrupted by an elbow injury in 2019 and the subsequent cancellation of the 2020 minor league season. Falter made his MLB debut with the Phillies in 2021, and he spent the next three seasons alternating between Philadelphia and the Triple-A Lehigh Valley IronPigs, serving as both a starting pitcher and a reliever. The Pirates acquired Falter in 2023, adding him to their starting rotation.

== Early life ==
Falter was born April 24, 1997, in Chino Hills, California. He became interested in baseball when his father Darwin encouraged him to do a school project on Sandy Koufax, a pitcher whom Falter then sought to emulate. In 2011, Falter helped take the United States national under-14 baseball team to a gold medal at the COPABE Junior Olympic Pan Am Championship in Venezuela, pitching a scoreless inning in relief of the championship game. As a student at Chino Hills High School, Falter was classmates with future National Basketball Association (NBA) player Lonzo Ball and developed a friendship with the Ball family. As a sophomore with the Chino Hills Huskies in 2013, Falter pitched a no-hitter, striking out 16 batters in an 11–0 victory over Bloomington High School. In his final season with Chino Hills, Falter had a 6–2 win–loss record, a 1.20 earned run average (ERA), and he struck out 97 hitters in 75 2/3 innings pitched. He pitched four complete games and two shutouts while securing two saves.

== Professional career ==
=== Draft and minor leagues (2015–2019) ===
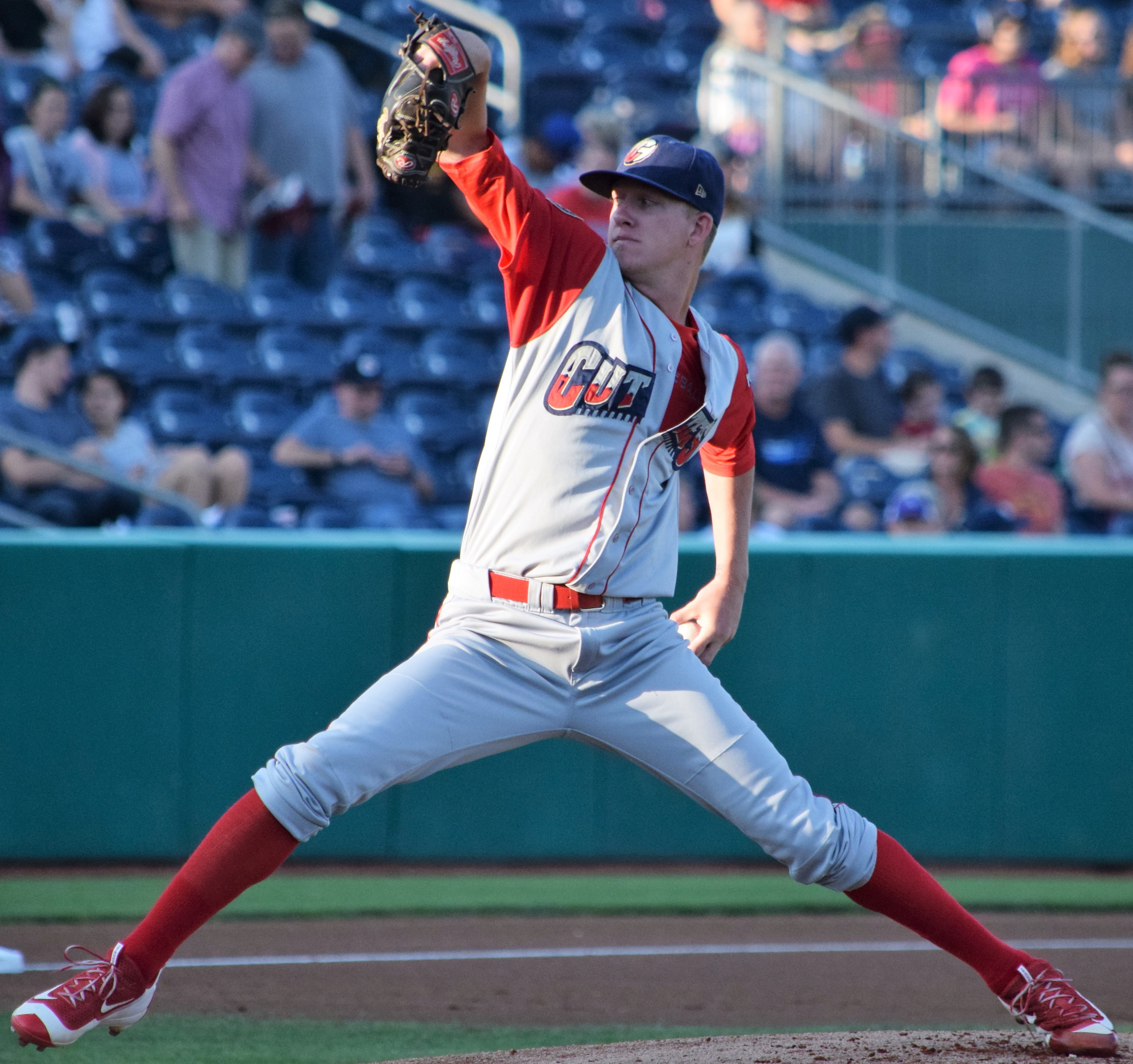
Falter with the Williamsport Crosscutters in 2016

The Philadelphia Phillies of Major League Baseball (MLB) selected Falter in the fifth round, with the 144th overall pick, of the 2015 MLB draft. At the time, Falter had committed to playing college baseball for the UC Santa Barbara Gauchos. He came to terms with the organization on a $420,000 signing bonus and was assigned to the Rookie-level GCL Phillies. Although his pitch velocity was not overpowering, Falter displayed good command in the Gulf Coast League, and he was 1–2 with a 3.45 ERA in his first season of professional baseball, striking out 25 batters in 28 2/3 innings. The next year, the Phillies promoted Falter to the Low-A Williamsport Crosscutters, where he was part of a group of young Phillies prospects that also included Adonis Medina, JoJo Romero, and Cole Irvin. Falter struggled in his first two Williamsport outings, and his performance improved as he demonstrated increased confidence on the mound. He also made a mechanical adjustment partway through the season, using his lower body to generate more velocity on his pitches. In 13 New York–Penn League games, Falter was 1–6 with a 3.17 ERA, recording 59 strikeouts in 59 2/3 innings.

Falter joined the Single-A Lakewood BlueClaws for the 2017 season, where the then-19-year-old pitcher was one of the youngest players on the roster. In 21 South Atlantic League starts that season, Falter went 8–7 with a 2.99 ERA, striking out 105 batters in 114 1/3 innings and impressing director of player development Joe Jordan. He continued his rise through the Phillies' farm system with a promotion to the High-A Clearwater Threshers in 2018. After going 4–2 with a 3.08 ERA in the first half of the season, Falter was named a Florida State League midseason All-Star that June. He missed about a month of the season, spending July 8 to August 7 on the disabled list. In 17 starts for Clearwater, Falter finished the year 8–4 with a 3.36 ERA, recording 83 strikeouts in 93 2/3 innings. After the regular Minor League Baseball season, he joined the Indios de Mayagüez of the Liga de Béisbol Profesional Roberto Clemente. Falter went 2–0 with a 0.42 ERA in five starts there, striking out nine across 21 1/3 innings.

In 2019, Falter was named to the six-man starting rotation for the Double-A Reading Fightin Phils. His season ended on July 6, when he sustained an ulnar collateral ligament injury of the elbow. The injury was not severe enough to necessitate Tommy John surgery, and Falter was shut down from throwing to rest his arm. Before his injury, Falter made 14 starts for Reading, during which he went 6–5 with a 3.84 ERA and struck out 62 batters in 77 1/3 innings. When the 2020 Minor League Baseball season was cancelled due to the effects of the COVID-19 pandemic, Falter was not assigned to the Phillies' alternate training site. Instead, he returned home to California and spent the season putting on muscle mass. At the end of the 2020 season, the Phillies added Falter to their 40-man roster, protecting him from being claimed by another team in the Rule 5 draft.

=== Philadelphia Phillies (2021–2023) ===
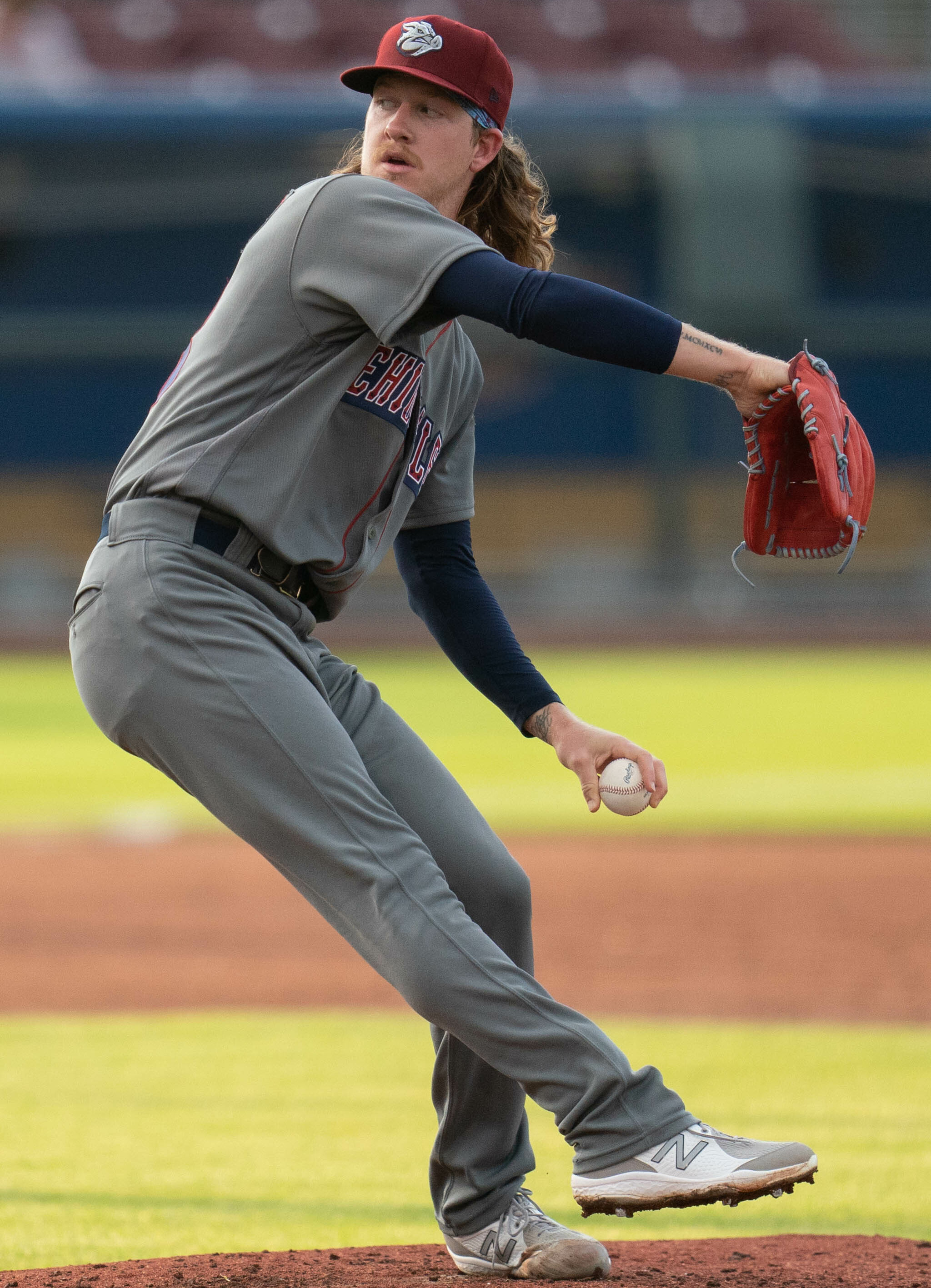
Falter with the Lehigh Valley IronPigs in 2022

The Phillies invited Falter to spring training in 2021, at the end of which he was assigned to the team's 30-player taxi squad. Falter made his MLB debut on April 25, pitching two innings in relief during Philadelphia's 12–2 loss to the Colorado Rockies. After pitching a scoreless seventh inning, he allowed a two-run home run to C. J. Cron in the eighth. After that outing, Falter was sent to the Triple-A Lehigh Valley IronPigs, where he established himself as a consistent presence in the starting rotation. He was recalled back to Philadelphia on June 15, where he served as the team's long reliever behind starters Spencer Howard and Vince Velasquez. He missed most of July with two separate stints on the COVID-19 injured list: once as a close contact of Alec Bohm, and again when he tested positive for the COVID-19 virus. Falter returned to the team on August 15, relieving Aaron Nola in a 7–4 loss to the Cincinnati Reds. He finished his rookie season with a 2–1 record and 5.61 ERA in 22 major league games, recording 34 strikeouts across 33 2/3 innings. In eight appearances for Lehigh Valley, he was 2–0 with a 1.76 ERA and 44 strikeouts across 30 2/3 innings.

Despite making the Phillies' 2022 Opening Day roster out of spring training as a reliever, Falter was sent down to Lehigh Valley at the end of April so that he could be stretched out into a starting pitcher. Falter never found a consistent role in Philadelphia or Lehigh Valley during the 2022 season: between April 26 and September 17, he was called up to the majors seven different times, filling in for injured starters Zach Eflin and Zack Wheeler, before being sent back to the IronPigs. He ultimately made 20 major league appearances that season, including 16 starts. In that time, he went 6–4 with a 3.86 ERA and struck out 74 batters in 84 innings. Falter also started nine games for the IronPigs, going 4–1 with a 1.91 ERA and 49 strikeouts in 47 Triple-A innings. The Phillies reached the MLB playoffs for the first time since 2011, and Falter made his postseason debut when he started Game 4 of the 2022 National League Championship Series against the San Diego Padres. His outing lasted only 24 pitches, as he allowed four runs before being relieved in the first inning, but the Phillies came back to win the game and ultimately take the series. Falter did not appear in the 2022 World Series, which the Phillies lost to the Houston Astros in six games.

When top pitching prospect Andrew Painter suffered an elbow injury during spring training, Falter was named to the Phillies' 2023 Opening Day starting rotation in his place. He struggled in his major league outings, going 0–7 with a 5.13 ERA in eight games before he was optioned back to the IronPigs on May 15. In Triple-A, Falter hoped to regain his pitching command, a task made more difficult as he adjusted to the smaller strike zone used by the newly implemented Automated Balls and Strikes system in the minor leagues. Despite his difficulties, other top pitchers in the Phillies farm system struggled with injury and command, and Falter remained the team's top choice of reserve starter should anyone in their rotation need to miss time to injury. After his demotion, Falter went 2–1 with a 4.21 ERA in 11 Triple-A games, striking out 35 batters in 47 innings.

=== Pittsburgh Pirates (2023–2025) ===
On August 1, 2023, the Phillies traded Falter to the Pittsburgh Pirates in exchange for infielder Rodolfo Castro. The Pirates had been interested in acquiring Falter for some time, and they hoped he would become a prominent member of their starting rotation. Four days after the trade, the Pirates called Falter up from the Indianapolis Indians to start against the Milwaukee Brewers. He pitched four innings in his Pittsburgh debut, allowing one run on six hits while striking out two. Falter's season ended on September 24, when he was placed on the 15-day injured list with a left neck strain. He made 10 appearances for the Pirates after the trade, including seven starts. He went 2–2 with a 5.58 ERA in those outings, striking out 32 hitters in 40 1/3 innings.

Despite posting a 7.88 ERA and allowing a team-worst six home runs in spring training, the Pirates named Falter their fifth starter for the 2024 season. After a strong showing in the first two months of the season, during which he posted a 3.22 ERA and consistently went deep into games, Falter struggled with fatigue in June, which affected his performance. On July 6, Falter left his start against the New York Mets with an injury in the third inning, and he was subsequently placed on the injured list with left triceps tendinitis. He missed three weeks with the injury, returning to the active roster on July 29. Falter was inconsistent on the mound upon his return: in his first seven starts after the injury, he had a 5.52 ERA and failed to pitch six full innings in any of those outings. This streak was broken on September 11, when he pitched 7 1/3 innings against the Miami Marlins, carrying a no-hitter into the seventh that was broken by a Jonah Bride single. Falter finished the season 8–9 with a 4.43 ERA in 28 starts, striking out 97 batters in 142 1/3 innings.

The 2025 MLB season was the first time Falter began spring training knowing that he would make the major-league roster, which allowed him to focus on refining his pitches. After an inconsistent April, Falter had a 0.76 ERA in 35 2/3 innings in the month of May. It was the lowest ERA for any Pirates pitcher with six starts in a calendar month since 1920. After that point, Falter struggled with his command, particularly allowing home runs to opposing batters. After posting a 6.28 ERA in his first three July starts, Falter broke the slump on July 23 against the Detroit Tigers, allowing one run in seven innings and striking out a season-high eight batters. It was also his first time pitching more than 5 2/3 innings since May 31. In 22 starts with the Pirates that season, Falter was 7–5 with a 3.73 ERA, striking out 70 batters in 113 1/3 innings.

=== Kansas City Royals (2025–2026) ===
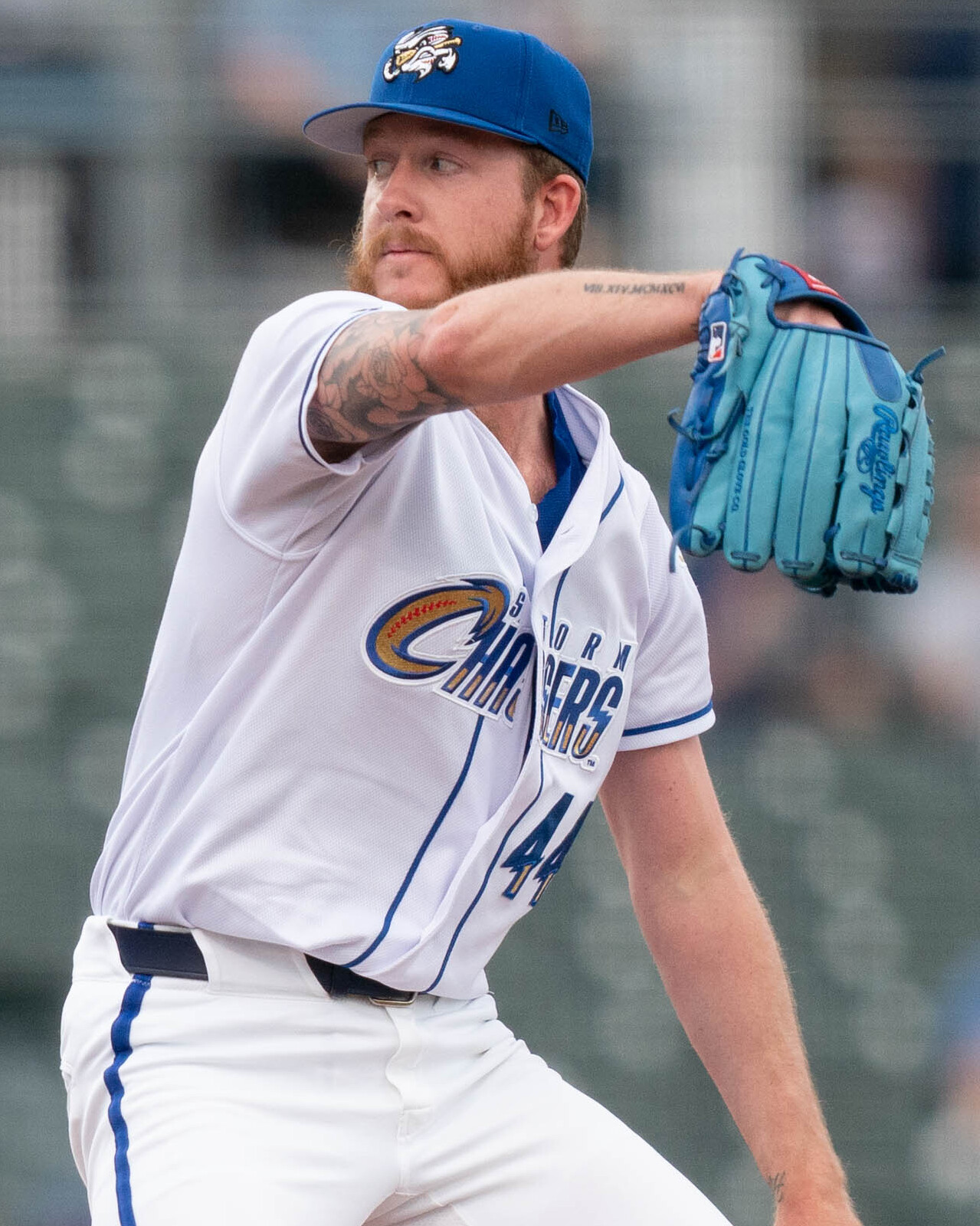
Falter with the Omaha Storm Chasers in 2026

On July 31, 2025, the Pirates traded Falter to the Kansas City Royals in exchange for Evan Sisk and Callan Moss. With Cole Ragans, Kris Bubic, and Michael Lorenzen all injured, the Royals needed more starting pitching depth, which they found in Falter. Upon Lorenzen's return on August 13, Falter, who had struggled in his starts against the Boston Red Sox and Washington Nationals, was moved to the Royals' bullpen. Pitching coach Brian Sweeney, who had previously worked with Falter in the Phillies farm system, altered the pitcher's grip on his slider, improving the pitch's efficiency. On August 22, Falter was struck by a line drive off the bat of Detroit Tigers player Zach McKinstry. Although he remained in the game after a brief evaluation, he was placed on the injured list the next day with a left biceps contusion. Falter remained on the injured list through the end of the season. In his four appearances with Kansas City, he was 0–2 with an 11.25 ERA, striking out 11 batters in 12 innings of work.

Falter entered the 2026 season as a swingman veteran for the Royals pitching staff. On April 3, he was placed on the 15-day injured list with left elbow inflammation, an injury he had managed for the last two years. During his rehab assignment with the Triple-A Omaha Storm Chasers, Falter altered his training routine to accommodate shorter, more frequent relief outings before his return to the major league roster on May 16. On May 27, the day after allowing seven earned runs in a 15–1 loss to the New York Yankees, Falter was designated for assignment by the Royals. In five appearances that season, including two starts, Falter posted an 0–2 record with a 13.97 ERA, striking out six batters across 9 2/3 innings. He cleared waivers and was sent outright to Omaha on June 2. Falter appeared in 17 games for Omaha, going 2–1 with a 3.35 ERA and striking out 46 batters in 43 innings.

=== Atlanta Braves (2026) ===
On August 1, 2026, the Royals traded Falter and Lane Thomas to the Atlanta Braves in exchange for pitching prospects Lucas Braun and Carter Holton. Upon acquiring Falter, the Braves assigned him to the Triple-A Gwinnett Stripers. He pitched appeared in seven games for Gwinnett and pitched 10 2/3 scoreless innings. On September 9, the Braves added Falter to their active roster. After two relief appearances, Falter was designated for assignment. He cleared waivers and was sent outright to Triple–A Gwinnett on September 16. Falter elected free agency on October 5.

== Pitcher profile ==
As of 2024, Falter has a four-pitch repertoire: a 92 mph (148 km/h) four-seam fastball, an 86 mph (138 km/h) slider, a 77 mph (124 km/h) curveball, and a 92 mph (148 km/h) sinker. Falter, who stands 6 ft 4 in (1.93 m), combats his comparatively low fastball velocity by employing a long stride into his pitching motion. His 7 ft 6 in (2.29 m) extension on the mound deceives hitters into thinking his pitches are faster than he actually throws them. This delivery is modeled after Sandy Koufax, Falter's favorite childhood pitcher. He supplements this extension with a small pause during his windup, which further disrupts the opposing hitter's timing.

== Personal life ==
Falter married his wife Kylee in Honolulu, Hawaii, in November 2023. Their first child was born November 2025.
