= Dennis Santana =

Dominican baseball player (born 1996)

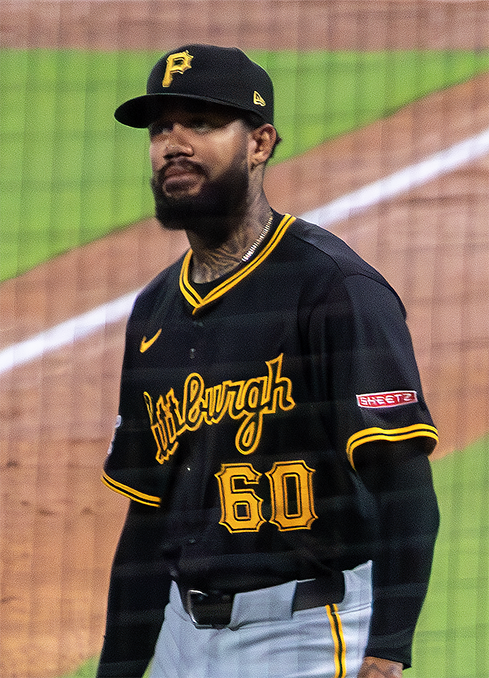
- Santana with the Pittsburgh Pirates in 2024

Free agent
- Pitcher
- Born: April 12, 1996 (age 30); San Pedro de Macorís, Dominican Republic
- Bats: Right Throws: Right

MLB debut
- June 1, 2018, for the Los Angeles Dodgers

MLB statistics (through 2026 season)
- Win–loss record: 17–25
- Earned run average: 4.37
- Strikeouts: 318
- Stats at Baseball Reference

Teams
- Los Angeles Dodgers (2018–2021); Texas Rangers (2021–2022); New York Mets (2023); New York Yankees (2024); Pittsburgh Pirates (2024–2026); Arizona Diamondbacks (2026)
Medals
Men's baseball
Representing Dominican Republic
World Baseball Classic
Bronze medal – third place	2026 Miami	Team

Dennis Anfernee Santana Sánchez (born April 12, 1996) is a Dominican professional baseball pitcher who is a free agent. He has played in Major League Baseball (MLB) for the Los Angeles Dodgers, Texas Rangers, New York Mets, New York Yankees, Pittsburgh Pirates, and Arizona Diamondbacks. He earned a bronze medal with the Dominican Republic at the 2026 World Baseball Classic.

== Career ==
=== Los Angeles Dodgers ===
==== Minor Leagues (2013-2018) ====
Santana signed with the Los Angeles Dodgers as an international free agent in March 2013. He made his professional debut in 2014 with the Dominican Summer League Dodgers and spent the whole season there, going 2–1 with a 1.05 ERA in twenty games. He pitched 2015 with the Arizona League Dodgers and Ogden Raptors, compiling a combined 2–5 record and 6.42 ERA in 13 games (11 starts), and 2016 with the Great Lakes Loons, posting a 5–9 record and 3.07 ERA with 124 strikeouts in 111.1 innings. He was a Midwest League All-Star with the Loons in 2016.

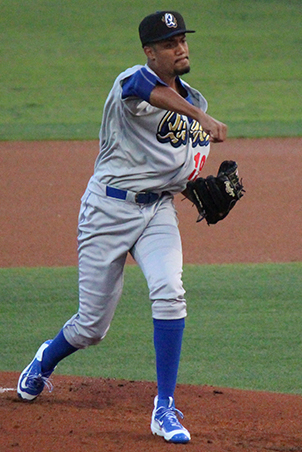
Santana with the Rancho Cucamonga Quakes in 2017

Santana started 2017 with the Rancho Cucamonga Quakes and was promoted to the Tulsa Drillers during the season. With the two teams, he was 8–7 with a 4.11 ERA in 24 games (21 starts). The Dodgers added him to the 40-man roster on November 20, 2017. He began 2018 with Tulsa but was promoted to the Triple–A Oklahoma City Dodgers in May. In his debut for them, he struck out 11 in six scoreless innings, for which he was named the Pacific Coast League Pitcher of the Week.

==== Major Leagues (2018-2021) ====
Santana was called up to the majors by the Dodgers for the first time on May 30, 2018 and made his debut on June 1, picking up the win in relief, despite allowing five runs on six hits in 3 2/3 innings against the Colorado Rockies. He also hit a two-RBI double in his first major league at-bat. He was scheduled to make his first major league start on June 7 against the Pittsburgh Pirates but suffered a right rotator cuff strain while warming up in the bullpen before the game and was placed on the disabled list, where he remained for the rest of the season.

In 2019, he pitched five innings for the Dodgers, across three appearances, allowing four runs on six hits. In 27 appearances for Oklahoma City (17 starts) he was 5–9 with a 6.94 ERA.

Santana made 12 appearances for the Dodgers during the pandemic-shortened season of 2020, with a 1–2 record and 5.29 ERA.

After struggling to a 6.00 ERA in 16 appearances to begin the 2021 season, Santana was designated for assignment on June 12, 2021.

=== Texas Rangers ===
On June 17, 2021, Santana was traded to the Texas Rangers in exchange for Kelvin Bautista and was assigned to the Triple-A Round Rock Express. He appeared in 63 games for Texas, working to a 3–8 record and 5.22 ERA with 54 strikeouts in 58 2/3 innings pitched.

On November 15, 2022, Santana was traded to the Atlanta Braves in exchange for cash considerations. On January 13, 2023, Santana signed a one-year, $1 million contract with the Braves, avoiding salary arbitration. On February 26, Santana was claimed off waivers by the Minnesota Twins.

=== New York Mets ===
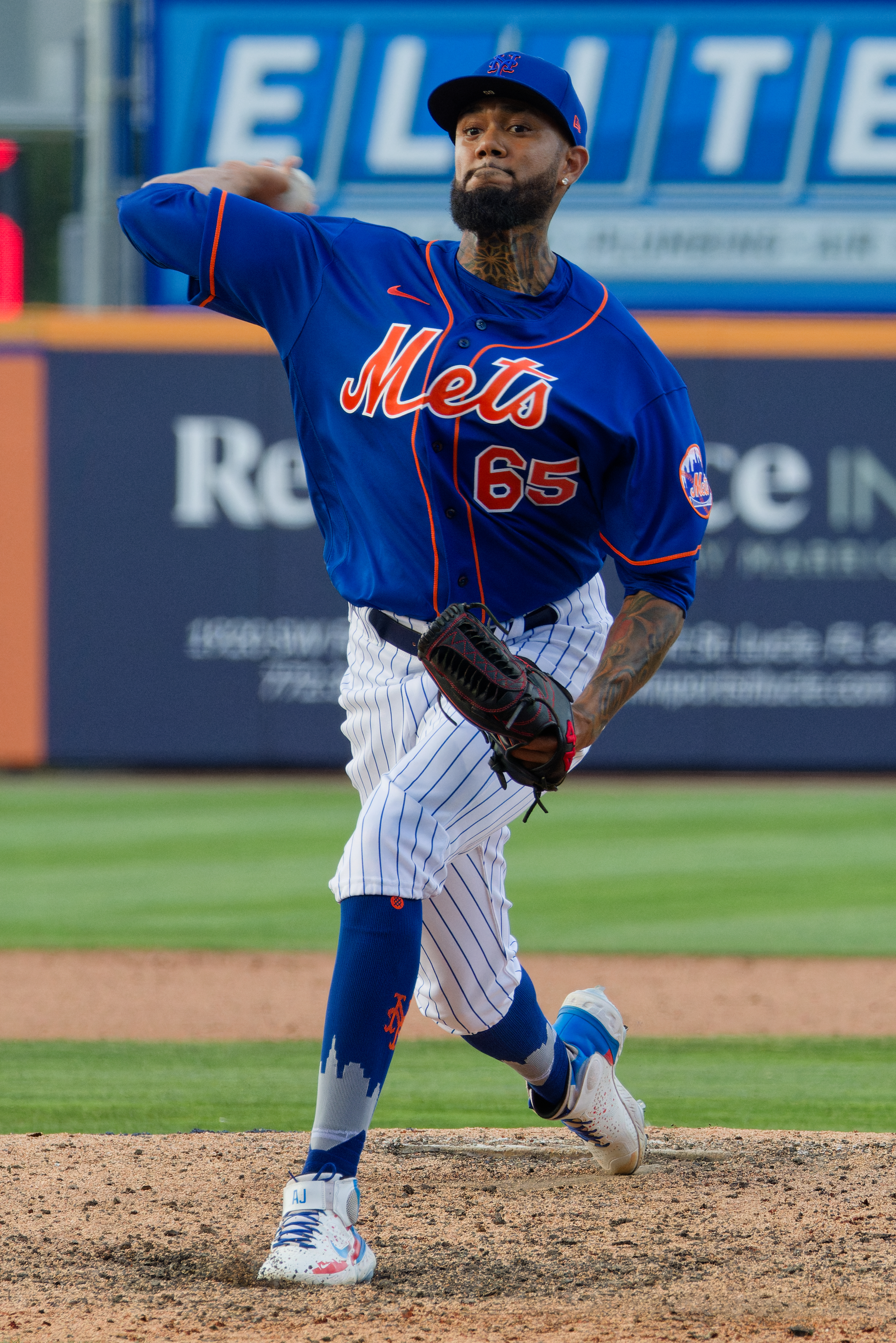
Santana with the New York Mets in 2023

On March 17, 2023, Santana was claimed off waivers by the New York Mets. He made seven appearances for the Mets, struggling to a 7.04 ERA with five walks and 10 strikeouts in 7 2/3 innings pitched. On April 14, Santana was designated for assignment after Jimmy Yacabonis was added to the roster. He cleared waivers and was sent outright to the Triple-A Syracuse Mets on April 18. On May 14, Santana was selected back to the Mets' active roster. After pitching a scoreless inning in a 3–2 loss against the Washington Nationals, Santana was designated for assignment the same day when Brooks Raley was activated from the injured list. On August 16, Santana was selected back to the major league roster. He was designated for assignment for the third time on August 19. Santana elected free agency on August 22.

=== New York Yankees ===
On December 6, 2023, Santana signed a minor league contract with the New York Yankees that included an invitation to spring training. He began the season with the Triple-A Scranton/Wilkes-Barre RailRiders, and was promoted to the major leagues on April 5 when Jonathan Loáisiga was placed on the 60-day injured list. In 23 appearances for the Yankees, he struggled to a 6.26 ERA with 19 strikeouts across 27 1/3 innings. The Yankees designated Santana for assignment on June 9 after calling up pitcher Ron Marinaccio.

=== Pittsburgh Pirates ===
On June 11, 2024, Santana was claimed off waivers by the Pittsburgh Pirates. In 39 appearances for the Pirates, Santana had a career-best 2.44 ERA with 50 strikeouts in 44 1/3 innings.

In February 2025, Santana lost his salary arbitration case against the Pirates, leaving him with a $1.4 million salary. On June 29, 2025, Santana was suspended three games for a June 19 incident in which he attempted to jump and swing at a fan in the stands at Comerica Park in Detroit.

Santana made 44 relief appearances for Pittsburgh in 2026, but struggled to a 2–5 record and 6.05 ERA with 37 strikeouts and two saves across 41 2/3 innings pitched. On July 23, 2026, Santana was once again designated for assignment to make room on the roster for pitcher Ron Marinaccio, this time after the Pirates acquired Marinaccio in a trade. He elected free agency after clearing waivers on July 29.

=== Arizona Diamondbacks ===
On August 5, 2026, Santana signed a minor league contract with the Arizona Diamondbacks. He made two appearances for the Triple–A Reno Aces, allowing three earned runs on four hits across 1 2/3 innings pitched. On August 16, the Diamondbacks selected Santana's contract, adding him to their active roster.
