= Jared Triolo =

American baseball player (born 1998)

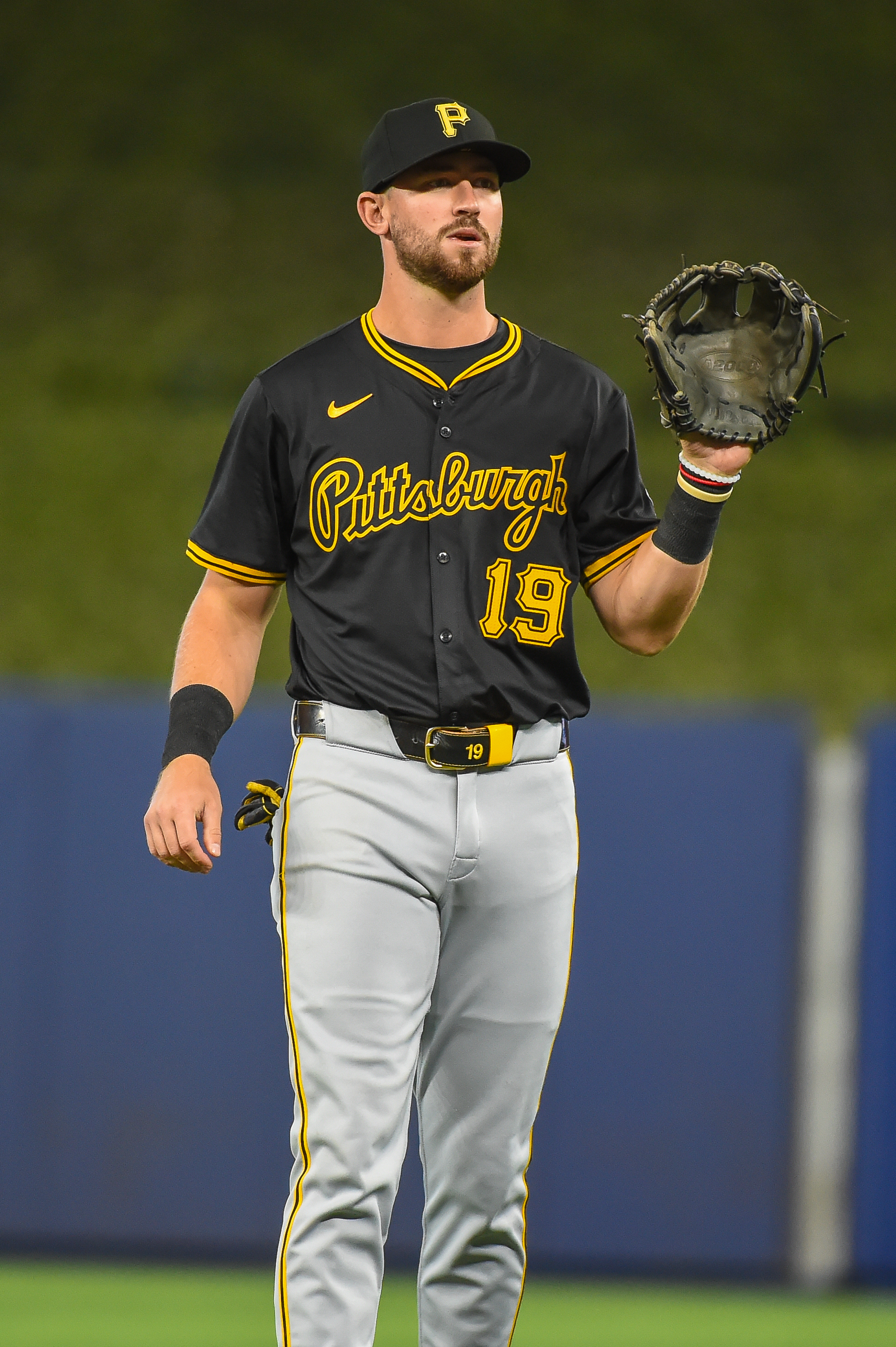
- Triolo with the Pittsburgh Pirates in 2024

Pittsburgh Pirates – No. 19
- Third baseman / Shortstop
- Born: February 8, 1998 (age 28); Nashua, New Hampshire, U.S.
- Bats: Right Throws: Right

MLB debut
- June 28, 2023, for the Pittsburgh Pirates

MLB statistics (through September 23, 2026)
- Batting average: .237
- Home runs: 22
- Runs batted in: 120
- Stats at Baseball Reference

Teams
- Pittsburgh Pirates (2023–present)

Career highlights and awards
- Gold Glove Award (2024)

Jared Robert Triolo (born February 8, 1998) is an American professional baseball third baseman for the Pittsburgh Pirates of Major League Baseball (MLB). He made his MLB debut in 2023.

== Amateur career ==
Triolo attended Lake Travis High School in Austin, Texas, where he earned All-State honors in baseball as a senior in 2016. After graduating, he enrolled at the University of Houston where he played college baseball for the Houston Cougars. In 2017 (batting .250) and 2018 (batting .276), he played collegiate summer baseball with the Bourne Braves of the Cape Cod Baseball League and was named a league all-star in 2018. As a junior at Houston in 2019, Triolo slashed .332/.420/.512 with seven home runs and 44 RBI over 56 games. In college he played 164 games at third base, 15 games in right field, and three games at shortstop.

== Professional career ==
=== Minor leagues ===
After Triolo's junior season at Houston, he was selected by the Pittsburgh Pirates with the 72nd overall selection in the 2019 Major League Baseball draft. He signed for $870,700.

Triolo made his professional debut with the West Virginia Black Bears of the Low–A New York–Penn League where he batted .239/ 314/.389 with two home runs and 34 RBI over sixty games, in which he played 41 games at third base and 17 games at shortstop. He did not play a game in 2020 due to the cancellation of the minor league season because of the COVID-19 pandemic. He played the 2021 season with the Greensboro Grasshoppers of the High-A East, slashing .304/.369/.480 with 15 home runs, 42 RBI, 29 doubles, and 25 stolen bases over 108 games, in which he played 102 games at third base and five games at shortstop. He was awarded a Minor League Gold Glove for his defense at third base. He was assigned to the Altoona Curve of the Double-A Eastern League for the 2022 season. Over 112 games, Triolo slashed .282/.376/.419 with nine home runs, 39 RBI, and 24 stolen bases, in which he played 87 games at third base, 17 games at shortstop, and seven games in center field.

On November 15, 2022, the Pirates selected Triolo's contract and added him to the 40-man roster to protect him from the Rule 5 draft. Triolo was optioned to the Indianapolis Indians of the Triple-A International League to begin the 2023 season. On March 27, 2023, it was announced that Triolo would undergo surgery to address a fractured hamate bone in one of his wrists and miss multiple months in recovery. Once he returned, Triolo played in 41 games split between the Single–A Bradenton Marauders and Indianapolis, hitting a cumulative .309/.412/.463 with one home run, 24 RBI, and eight stolen bases while playing 32 games at third base, 16 games at shortstop, nine games at second base, and three games at first base.

=== Major leagues ===
On June 27, 2023, Triolo was promoted to the major leagues for the first time following an injury to Ke'Bryan Hayes. He made his MLB debut the next day versus the San Diego Padres and recorded his first MLB hit, a single. He hit his first MLB home run on August 13, a pinch-hit three run home run at off Alex Young at PNC Park, helping lead the Pirates to a 4-2 win over the Cincinnati Reds. Triolo appeared in 54 games for the Pirates during the 2023 season and batted .298/.388/.398 with three home runs and 21 RBI over 181 at-bats.

The Pirates named Triolo to his first Opening Day roster for the 2024 season, and Pirates manager Derek Shelton announced he would be the team's starting second baseman. He spent the entirety of the season with Pittsburgh and batted .216/.296/.315 with nine home runs and 46 RBI in 394 at-bats. He played 61 games at third base, 47 at second base, nine at shortstop, nine at first base, and one in right field. His defensive efforts earned him the National League Gold Glove Award for utilitymen.

Triolo began the 2025 season on the injured list with a lumbar spine strain. He was activated on April 16 and returned to the Pirates. In July, he was optioned to Indianapolis after hitting .158 over 55 games with Pittsburgh. He was promoted back to the Pirates on August 1. Across 107 games played with the Pirates, Triolo hit .227 with seven home runs, 24 RBI, and 13 stolen bases.

Triolo was named to the Pirates' Opening Day roster to open the 2026 season and had the game-winning RBI in Pittsburgh's 6-5 win over the Miami Marlins on Opening Day. He was placed on the injured list on April 5 with a right knee patellar tendon injury. Triolo was activated and returned to the Pirates on May 2. Across 125 games played, he batted .238 with three home runs and 29 RBI.
