= Pirate City =

Spring training complex of Pittsburgh Pirates in Bradenton, Florida, United States

- Interactive map of Pirate City
- Location: 1701 27th Street East; Bradenton, Florida; United States
- Coordinates: 27.483824°N 82.529388°W
- Owner: Pittsburgh Pirates
- Operator: Pittsburgh Pirates
- Surface: Grass

Construction
- Renovated: 2008

Tenants
- Pittsburgh Pirates (NL) (1969–present); FCL Pirates (FCL) (1978–present)

Website
- Official website

Pirate City is the site of minor league and spring training activities for the Pittsburgh Pirates of the National League. The complex is located in Bradenton, Florida, and serves as the site of the Pirates spring training workouts, while nearby LECOM Park (formerly known as McKechnie Field) is the site of the team's home spring training games.

== History ==
While the Pirates have been training in Bradenton since 1969, the Pirate City complex received a major renovation in 2008, the result of a $20 million financial agreement between the team and city that fixed up both the Pirate City and McKechnie Field.

Pirate City also hosts corporate events, retreats, parties, receptions and all types of baseball camps and events. It has served as a training facility for the Netherlands national baseball team during the 2009 World Baseball Classic and hosted the LG Twins of the Korea Baseball Organization. The Pirates' rookie-level minor league affiliate, the Gulf Coast Pirates of the Gulf Coast League, play their home games at Pirate City.

The complex includes player dorms, coaches' suites and offices for staff and front-office personnel. For the majority of the year, the dorms are occupied by the organization's Minor League players, players doing rehabilitation work in Bradenton and those who come to Pirate City for the fall instructional league. Per team policy, all players participating in Minor League camp are required to live in one of the 75 player dorm rooms, each of which holds two people.

There are four full-sized practice fields at the complex, each one named for a Pirates Hall of Famer: Roberto Clemente (field 1), Pie Traynor (field 2), Honus Wagner (field 3) and Willie Stargell (field 4).

One of the chapters in Ron Luciano's book The Umpire Strikes Back is titled "Where The #$@& Is Pirate City?", as various players (and umpires) had difficulty finding the place.
