= Florida Complex League Pirates =

- Founded in 1968; Bradenton, Florida

Minor league affiliations
- Class: Rookie
- League: Florida Complex League
- Division: Northwest Division
- Previous leagues: Gulf Coast League (1968–2020)

Major league affiliations
- Team: Pittsburgh Pirates

Minor league titles
- League titles (1): 2012
- Division titles (6): 2002; 2003; 2008; 2013; 2023; 2024

Team data
- Name: FCL Pirates Black & Gold
- Previous names: GCL Pirates (1968–2020)
- Ballpark: Pirate City complex
- Owner/ Operator: Pittsburgh Pirates
- Manager: Jose Mendez

The Florida Complex League Pirates are a Rookie-level affiliate of the Pittsburgh Pirates, competing in the Florida Complex League of Minor League Baseball. Prior to 2021, the team was known as the Gulf Coast League Pirates. The team plays its home games in Bradenton, Florida, at the Pirate City complex. The team is composed mainly of players who are in their first year of professional baseball either as draftees or non-drafted free agents from the United States, Canada, Dominican Republic, Venezuela, and other countries.

== History ==
The team was first established in 1968, and has competed continuously since then. The team won division championships in 2002, 2003, 2008, and 2013. In 2012, the team won its first league championship.

In 2009, the team had nine players each from the Dominican Republic and Venezuela, with the United States third at six players. They were the two highly publicized, pioneering Indian pitchers, Rinku Singh and Dinesh Patel, who became the first Indian-born players to sign professional baseball contracts in the United States, a second baseman from Colombia, two players from Puerto Rico, and one player each from Mexico, Panama, Australia, Canada, and one of the first three players ever signed out of South Africa, Gift Ngoepe, and one of the Americans, Chris Aure, was from Alaska. "We eat together in the cafeteria, but sometimes we try each other's foods," Ngoepe says. "I listen to the Indians' music when I go past their rooms, and they listen to my music from Africa. We tell each other stories about our home countries. We do everything together." "Everybody's the same here, like family," Venezuelan infielder Elevys Gonzalez says.

For the 2021 season, the team is fielding two squads in the league, differentiated as "Black" and "Gold" in reference to the team's colors.

== Season-by-season ==
Year	Record	Win–loss %	Manager	Regular season finish	Playoffs
1968	27-33	.450	Buddy Pritchard	6th GCL	No playoffs until 1983
1969	28-26	.519	Buddy Pritchard	4th GCL	
1970	23-40	.365	Dick Cole	8th GCL	
1971	20-32	.385	Ed Napoleon	6th GCL	
1972	21-39	.350	Ed Napoleon	7th(t) GCL	
1973	17-37	.315	Woody Huyke	9th GCL	
1974	11-42	.208	Woody Huyke	9th GCL	
1975	23-31	.426	Woody Huyke	4th GCL	
1976	11-41	.212	Woody Huyke	7th GCL	
1977	22–32	.407	Woody Huyke	7th GCL	
1978	21–32	.396	Woody Huyke	6th GCL	
1979	20–32	.385	Woody Huyke	6th GCL	
1980	24–39	.381	Woody Huyke	8th GCL	
1981	32–28	.533	Woody Huyke	5th GCL	
1982	27–35	.435	Woody Huyke	3rd GCL	
1983	28–32	.467	Woody Huyke	3rd GCL North	Did not qualify
1984	21–42	.333	Woody Huyke	5th GCL North	Did not qualify
1985	15–47	.242	Woody Huyke	5th GCL North	Did not qualify
1986	24–39	.381	Woody Huyke	5th GCL North	Did not qualify
1987	33–30	.390	Woody Huyke	2nd GCL North	Did not qualify
1988	26–37	.413	Julio Garcia	5th GCL South	Did not qualify
1989	21–42	.333	Woody Huyke	8th GCL South	Did not qualify
1991	30–29	.508	Woody Huyke	3rd GCL Central	Did not qualify
1992	23–37	.383	Woody Huyke	4th GCL Central	Did not qualify
1993	21–38	.356	Woody Huyke	7th GCL West	Did not qualify
1994	25–35	.417	Woody Huyke	4th GCL West	Did not qualify
1995	23–36	.390	Woody Huyke	4th GCL Northwest	Did not qualify
1996	28–31	.475	Woody Huyke	3rd GCL Northwest	Did not qualify
1997	27–32	.458	Woody Huyke	6th GCL Northwest	Did not qualify
1998	25–35	.407	Woody Huyke	6th GCL West	Did not qualify
1999	24–35	.407	Woody Huyke	5th GCL North	Did not qualify
2000	34–26	.567	Woody Huyke	2nd GCL North	Did not qualify
2001	22–34	.393	Woody Huyke	6th GCL West	Did not qualify
2002	37–23	.617	Woody Huyke	1st GCL North	Lost in 1st round vs. GCL Dodgers (1 game to 0)
2003	36–20	.643	Woody Huyke	1st GCL North	Lost in Finals vs. GCL Braves (2 games to 0)
2004	30–28	.517	Woody Huyke	3rd GCL South	Did not qualify
2005	28–26	.519	Jeff Livesey	2nd GCL South	Did not qualify
2006	27–26	.509	Turner Ward	4th GCL North	Did not qualify
2007	26–30	.464	Tom Prince	4th GCL South	Did not qualify
2008	37–19	.661	Tom Prince	1st GCL South	Lost in 1st round vs. GCL Phillies (1 game to 0)
2009	29–31	.483	Tom Prince	4th GCL North	Did not qualify
2010	29–30	.492	Tom Prince	4th GCL North	Did not qualify
2011	34–26	.567	Tom Prince	2nd GCL North	Lost in 1st round
2012	36–24	.600	Tom Prince	2nd GCL North	Won GCL Championship vs. GCL Red Sox (2 games to 0); Won in first round vs. GCL Cardinals (1 game to 0)
2013	33-27	.600	Milver Reyes	1st GCL Northwest	Lost in 1st round vs. GCL Nationals (1 game to 0)
2014	20-40	.333	Milver Reyes	3rd GCL Northwest	Did not qualify
2015	28-31	.475	Milver Reyes	3rd GCL Northwest	Did not qualify
2016	22-34	.393	Edgar Varela	2nd GCL Northwest	Did not qualify
2017	26-34	.433	Dave Turgeon	3rd GCL Northeast	Did not qualify

== Rosters ==
Florida Complex League Pirates roster
Players	Coaches/Other
Pitchers: 30 Claudio Estelie; 46 Tony Gonzalez; 63 Joel Ibarra; 58 Wifrailyn Jaquez; 31 Ronaldys Jimenez; 19 Dioris Martinez; 84 Yeison Martinez; 10 McLane Moody; 55 Juan Muniz; 85 Darwin Roa; 25 Andres Silvera; 12 Robinson Smith; 56 Angel Soriano; 76 Victor Trejo; 82 Stainer Valdez; Catchers: 35 Javier Acevedo; 81 Jonathan Rivero; Infielders: 34 Adbiel Feliz; 13 Kendrick Herrera; 64 Jayden Kim; 14 Hyun Seung Lee; 80 Francisco Loreto; 77 Gustavo Melendez; 15 Darell Morel; 52 Armstrong Muhoozi; Outfielders: 2 Carl Calixte; 75 Gabriel Rodriguez; 28 Carlos Tejera; 3 Edgar Walker	Manager: 26 Jim Horner; Coaches: -- Josh Combs (pitching); 6 Brady Conlan (hitting); 62 Renny Duarte (pitching); 41 Damon Elarton (pitching); 37 Elys Escobar (hitting); 71 Dilan Espinal (development); 78 Bart Haanegraaf (performance); 65 Joaquin Murrietta (hitting); 60-day injured list: -- Keuri Almonte (full season); -- Ronaldo Gallo; 7 Carter Gwost; 73 Michell Ojeda; -- Jose Regalado (full season); 7-day injured list; * On Pittsburgh Pirates 40-man roster; ~ Development list; # Rehab assignment; ∞ Reserve list; ‡ Restricted list; § Suspended list; † Temporarily inactive list; Roster updated July 7, 2026; Transactions; → More rosters: MiLB • Florida Complex League; → Pittsburgh Pirates minor league players
