= Flag of Pittsburgh =

- Use: Civil flag
- Proportion: 3:5
- Adopted: 1899
- Design: A vertical tricolor of black, gold and black charged in the center with the arms of the City of Pittsburgh
- Use: Civil ensign
- Proportion: 3:4
- Design: A vertical tricolor of black, gold and black charged in the center with the City crest within a circle of thirteen blue stars
- Use: Flag of the mayor of Pittsburgh

The flag of Pittsburgh is the official municipal flag of the City of Pittsburgh, Pennsylvania. It is a vertical bicolor triband of black and gold with the municipal coat of arms in the center.

In 2004, the flag was ranked as the twenty-fourth best flag design out of 150 city flags by the North American Vexillological Association, and was the top-rated tricolor.

In tribute to the flag, all four professional athletic teams in Pittsburgh in the sports of baseball, football, hockey, and soccer have black and gold as their team colors. The arms are based on those of William Pitt, 1st Earl of Chatham, namesake of the city.

== Design of the flag ==
The flag is defined in the Code of Ordinances, City of Pittsburgh, Title I, Article I, Chapter 103, Section 3 as follows:

(a) The following shall be the forms, devices and colors of the City civic flag, ensign, pennant and streamer: the colors in the several forms shall be black and gold, of the hues or tints as expressed upon the pattern, and the exact copy of which is on file in the office of the City Clerk.

(b) The civic flag, or standard of the City, shall be as follows: the material shall be American-made bunting or silk of the colors or hues above designated, ten (10) feet in length and six (6) feet in width, or in proportion thereto. The same shall be parted vertically per pale in three (3) equal parts, of which the first and [third] shall be black and the second or middle pale gold. Upon the latter shall be blazoned the City arms, as borne upon the City seal, and the same shall be blazoned upon the middle, and occupy one-third (1/3) of the surface thereof.

The civic flag shall be displayed upon public building, at meetings of Councils and upon suitable public occasions, provided that it shall never be displayed in any position that indicates superiority or precedence to the United States flag.

(c) The City ensign or merchant flag shall be composed and parted as provided for the civic flag or standard in subsection (b) hereof; except that instead of the entire City arms there shall be blazoned upon the central pale the crest of the City arms, surrounded by thirteen (13) five-pointed dark blue stars, in a circle, whose diameter shall be four-fifths (4/5) of the width of the pale. The length or fly shall be six (6) feet, the depth or hoist four (4) feet six (6) inches or in proportion thereto.

(d) The City pennant shall be a triangular piece of gold bunting five (5) feet in length by four (4) feet in width, or in proportion thereto. In the center thereof shall be placed a black triangular field two (2) feet in width and three (3) feet in length, upon which shall be displayed the crest of the City arms and a circle of blue stars, as borne upon the City ensign.

(e) The City streamer shall be made of materials and colors above indicated two (2) feet in width and fifteen (15) feet in length, or in proportion thereto. The black shall be borne next to the staff, and shall be in length one-fourth (1/4) the length of the streamer, and shall bear upon the center thereof the City crest, gold or gilded.

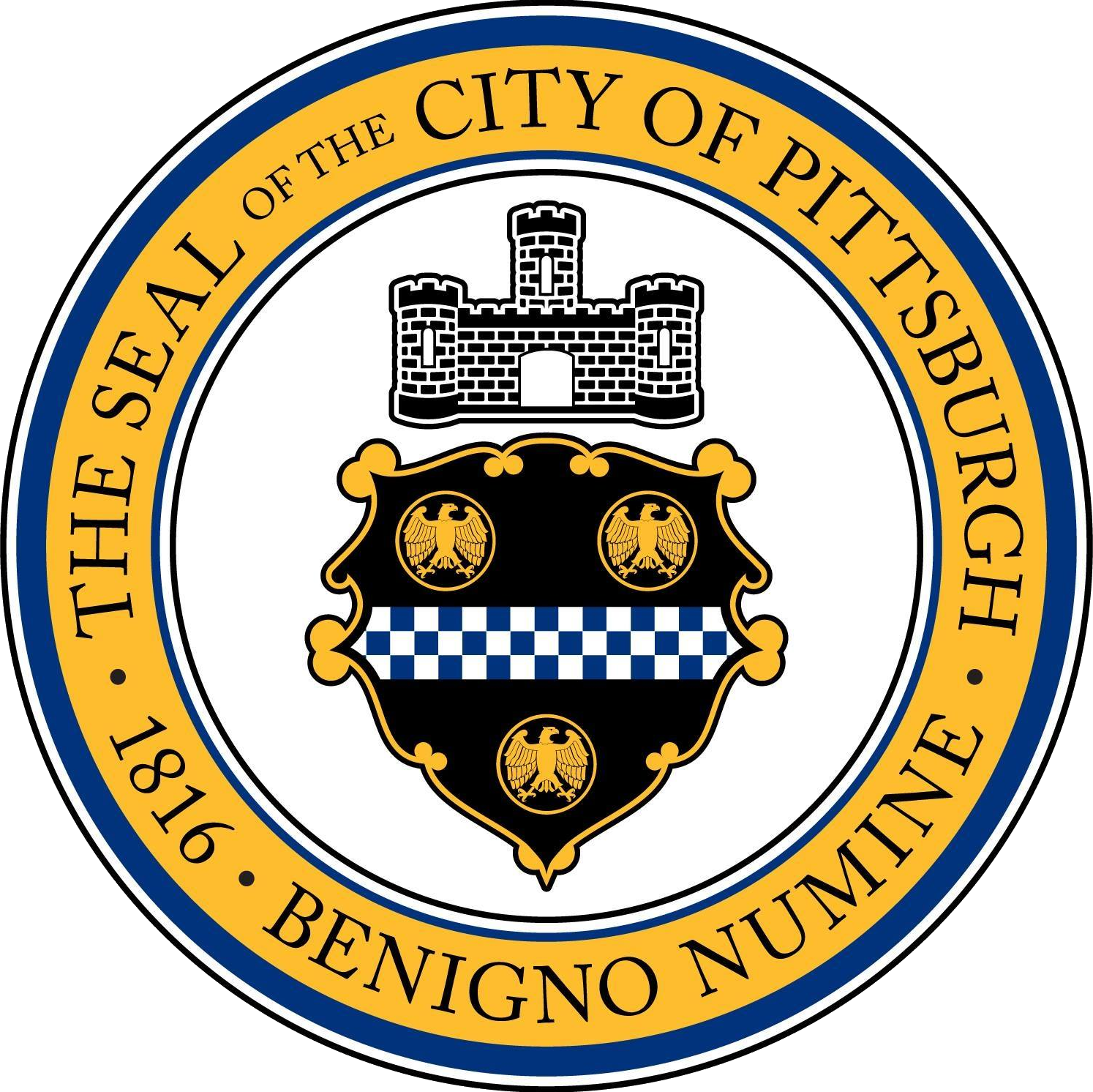
The Great Seal of the City of Pittsburgh, Pennsylvania

The arms of William Pitt, Earl of Chatham form the basis for the arms of Pittsburgh

== Insignia ==
=== Motto ===
The phrase Benigno Numine was the motto of the Earl of Chatham. It is generally translated as "With the Benevolent Deity" or "By the Favour of the Heavens".

It was adopted by the newly formed city in 1816. It was excluded from seals and official documents and emblems in the early 20th century before being restored to the seal by City Council on July 3, 1950, and approved by the Mayor on July 7, 1950. Even then, widespread use of the motto was not implemented until City Council looked into the matter in November 1958.

=== Coat of arms and seal ===
The city of Pittsburgh's coat of arms is based on the arms of William Pitt, the first Earl of Chatham and the city's namesake. The crest of the city's coat of arms serves as a sort of mural crown, featuring an image of a fortress. The Fraternal Order of Police, whose first lodge was founded in Pittsburgh, additionally features the city's coat of arms within its emblem.

The official blazon of the city's coat of arms, as defined by a 1925 city ordinance, is as follows:

On a field Sable, a fess chequay Argent et Azure, between three bezants bearing eagles rising with wings displayed and inverted Or. For crest, Sable a triple-towered castle masoned Argent.

The design of the seal of Pittsburgh, is defined in the Code of Ordinances, City of Pittsburgh, Title I, Article I, Chapter 103, Section 2 as follows:

(a) The great seal of the City and the lesser seals of the same shall be of the following design:

(1) The great seal is a circle bearing in its center the arms and the crest of the City and upon its periphery a belt or band of Roman capital letters forming the legend "The Seal of the City of Pittsburgh, 1816, Benigno Numine."

(2) Lesser seals are the great seal of the City with this addition: on an arc of a circle having the same center as, but shorter radius than, the aforesaid legend, and placed directly below the City arms, the proper designation of the sealing office, as "Office of the Mayor," "Office of the City Clerk" or the like, such designation to be in Roman capital letters, smaller than, but of like face to those used in the peripheral legend.

(b) Hereafter all dies, engravings, plates or reproductions of the great seal and lesser seals of the City shall conform strictly to the aforesaid description, and the City arms and crest as used thereon shall adhere strictly to the official graphic rendering of the arms and crest as preserved in the archives in Council.
