= List of St. Louis Cardinals coaches =

The St. Louis Cardinals, based in St. Louis, Missouri, are a professional baseball franchise that compete in the National League of Major League Baseball (MLB). The club employs coaches who support – and report directly to – the manager. Coaches for various aspects of the game, including pitching, hitting, baserunning and fielding, give instruction to players to assist them in exercising the major disciplines that must be successfully executed to compete at the highest level. These specialized roles are a relatively new development, as coaches initially did not have specific roles and instead had titles such as "first assistant", "second assistant", etc. St. Louis Cardinals coaches have played an important role in the team's eleven World Series titles. Many are retired players who at one time played for the team. Coaching is often part of the path for Major League managerial hopefuls, as a coach's previous experiences typically include managing and/or coaching at the minor league level. Charley O'Leary and Heinie Peitz, both former Cardinals players, became the first coaches the Cardinals employed as positions separate from the manager in 1913.

The longest-tenured coach in Cardinals' franchise history is Red Schoendienst, who has filled a variety of roles for the St. Louis Cardinals. First, he played 15 seasons as a second baseman for the Cardinals before becoming an on-field coach in 1962 in his penultimate season as an active player. He continued to coach through 1964, and the next season, became the Cardinals' manager. Returning as an on-field coach for the Cardinals in 1979, Schoendienst remained in that capacity until 1995. From 1996 until his death in 2018, he served as a special assistant to the general manager as a coaching advisor. In all, Schoendienst coached for St. Louis for 38 total seasons. He has also worn a St. Louis Major League uniform in eight different decades, won four World Series titles as part of on-field personnel and two more World Series titles since moving into his role as an advisor.

The current longest-tenured coach through 2015 is third-base coach José Oquendo, who has been coaching for the Cardinals since 1999. The latest addition is assistant hitting coach Bill Mueller, who was hired before the 2015 season. The longest-tenured on-field coach in franchise history is Buzzy Wares; he is also the only coach for the Cardinals with a consecutive on-field season streak of 20 or more seasons with 23. Schoendienst is the only other with 20 or more total seasons; he also had a streak of 17 consecutive seasons. Dave Duncan and Dave McKay are both tied for third with 16 total seasons and both with a streak of 16 consecutive seasons. Jose Oquendo is also tied with Duncan and McKay with 16 years during the 2015 season as it marks his 16 consecutive season as an on field coach. Others with ten or more seasons include Mike González, Johnny Lewis, Marty Mason, Gaylen Pitts and Dave Ricketts. Dal Maxvill is the only former Cardinals coach to have become a general manager for the Cardinals. Ray Blades, Ken Boyer, González, Johnny Keane, Jack Krol, Marty Marion, Bill McKechnie, Schoendienst and Harry Walker have all also managed the Cardinals. Cardinals coaches who have been elected to the National Baseball Hall of Fame and Museum include Bob Gibson, McKechnie, Dave Parker and Schoendienst. George Kissell so important that the Cardinals have an award named after him. Kissell managed in the Cardinal farm system through 1957, scouted for them in 1958–62, then returned to the field as a minor league manager in 1963–67. In 1968, he spent his first season as a roving instructor in the Cardinal system, where his efforts led to the nickname of "the Professor", and his influence is generally regarded as being a major basis for what came to be known as the "Cardinal Way".[2] He mentored a number of major league managers, including Sparky Anderson, Joe Torre, and Tony LaRussa.[3]

== Current coaching staff ==
- Manager: Oliver Marmol (2017–present)
- Bench: Daniel Descalso (2024–present)
- Hitting: Joel McKeithan (2027–present)
- Assistant hitting: Brandon Allen (2023–present)
- Assistant hitting: Casey Chenoweth (2026–present)
- Pitching: Dusty Blake (2021–present)
- Assistant pitching: Kyle Driscoll (2026–present)
- Assistant pitching/Bullpen: Julio Rangel (2023–present)
- First base: Stubby Clapp (2019–present)
- Third base: Ron 'Pop' Warner (2017–present)
- Outfield/Baserunning/Quality control: Jon Jay (2025–present)
- Assistant/Bullpen: Jamie Pogue (2012–present)
- Bullpen catcher: Kleininger Teran (2015–present)

== Lists of coaches ==
Key
#	Ordinal number in the succession of coaches
Prior role, other notes:	Previous Cardinal coaching assignment or assignment in another organization: M (Manager), BN (Bench coach), PT (Pitching), BP (Bullpen), H (Hitting), AH (Assistant hitting), 1BC (First base), 3BC (Third base), QC (Quality Control), SA (Special assistant), MI (Coached or managed in minor leagues)
Ref	Reference(s)
Roles	Also a player (*), manager (M), or executive (E) for the Cardinals
Awards	Former Gold Glove (G), Silver Slugger (S), Cy Young (C) or MVP (V) Award winner
∂	Former MLB All-Star (1933–present only)
§	Inducted into the Baseball Hall of Fame as a Cardinal
†, ‡	Inducted into the Baseball Hall of Fame primarily as a player (†) or as a manager and/or an executive (‡)

=== Bench coaches ===
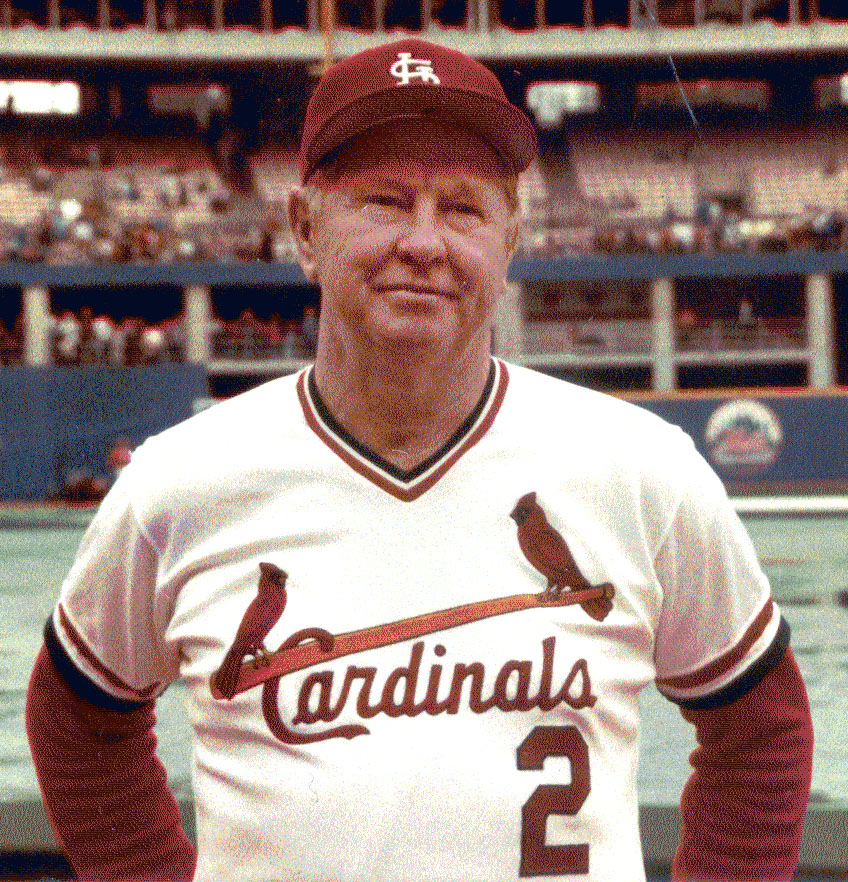
Shown here in 1983, Red Schoendienst served the Cardinals in some capacity in eight different decades, including as a coach and advisor from 1979 to 2018.

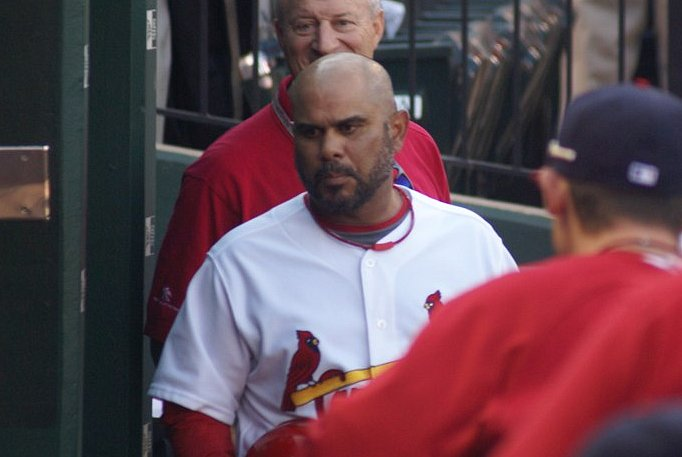
José Oquendo is currently the longest-tenured on-field coach.

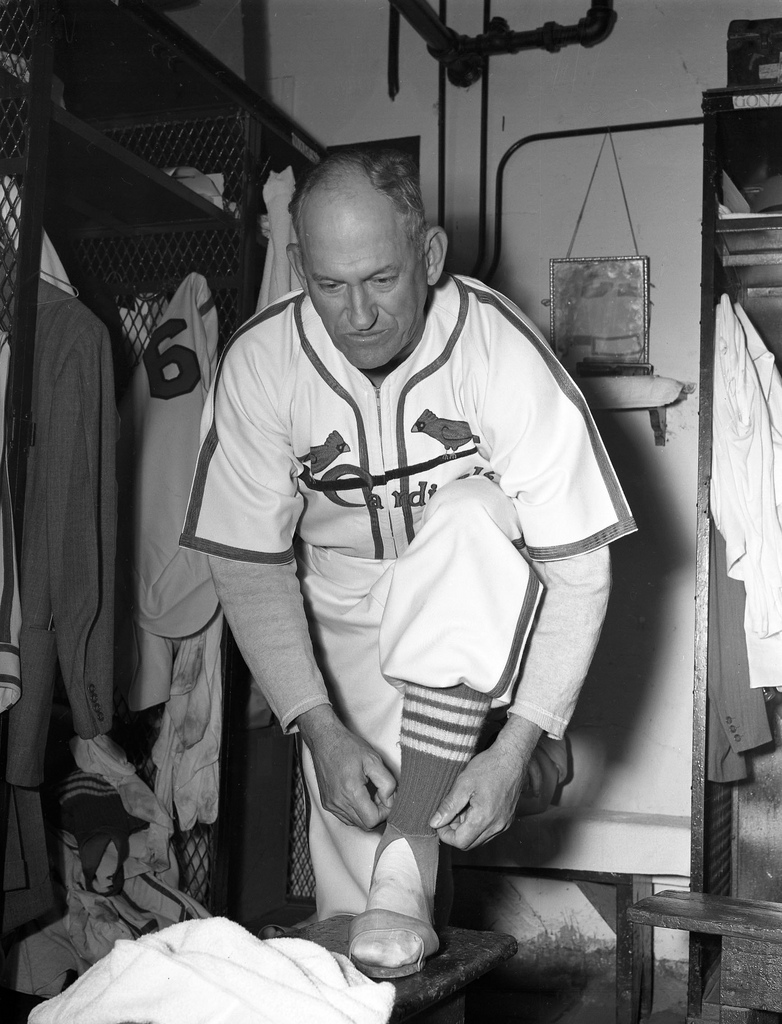
Buzzy Wares, pictured here during the 1946 World Series, spent the most seasons as an on-field coach for the Cardinals (1930–52).

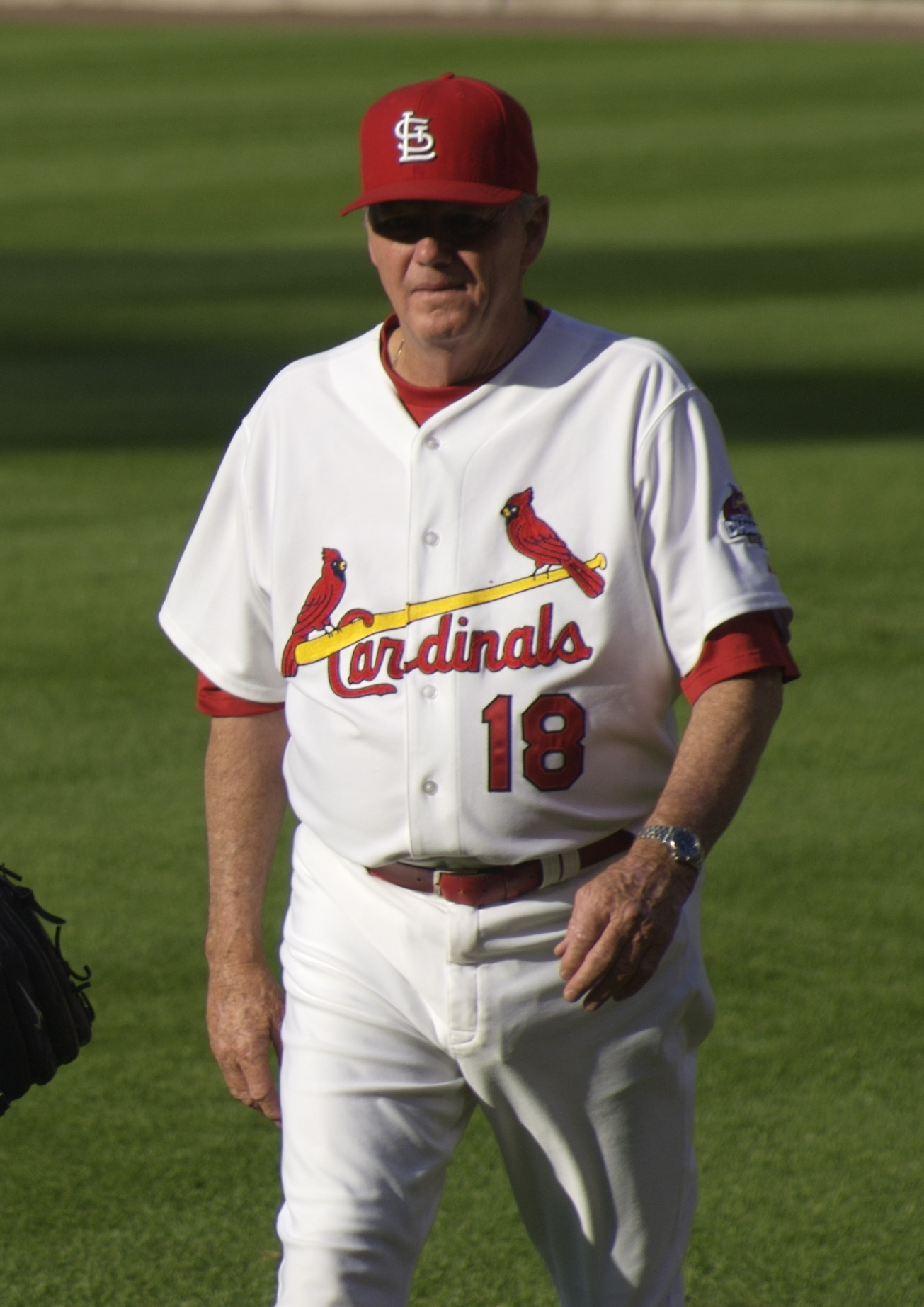
Pitching coach Dave Duncan coached for the Cardinals with manager Tony La Russa from 1996 to 2011.

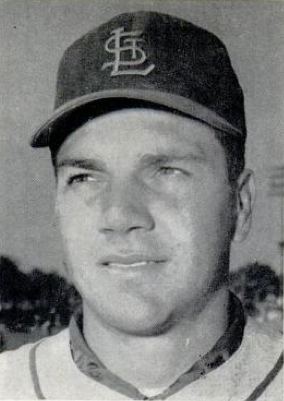
Ken Boyer won an MVP, eleven All-Star selections, five Gold Glove awards, coached and managed for the Cardinals between 1955 and 1980.

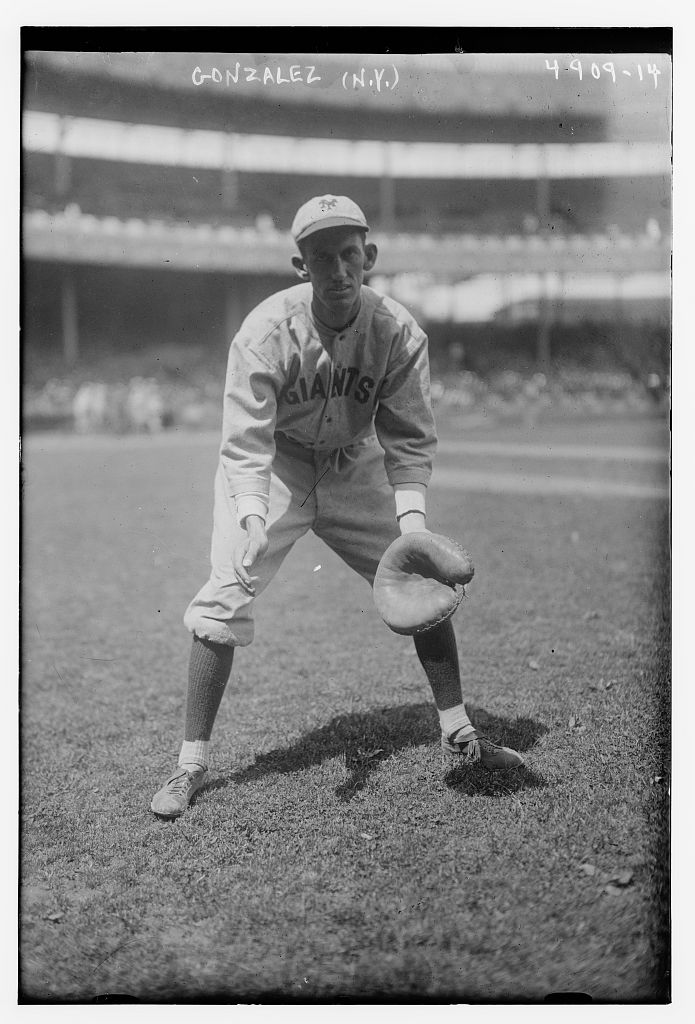
Mike González played or coached on five World Series champion Cardinals teams in the 1930s and 1940s.

#	Coach	Seasons	Prior role, other notes:	Ref
	Red Schoendienst ^{M∂†§}	1984–1995	MI (1983–88)	
	Ron Hassey	1996	Vars. coaching pos, Colorado Rockies (1993–95)	
	Carney Lansford ^{S∂}	1997–98	BN (Oakland Athletics, 1994–95)	
	José Oquendo	1999	MI (1998)	
	Mark DeJohn	2000–01		
	Joe Pettini	2002–11	MI (1989–2001)	
	Mike Aldrete	2012–14	AH (2008–11)	
	David Bell	2015–17	AH (2014)	
	Mike Shildt	2018	3BC (2017)	
	Ron 'Pop' Warner	2018	SA (2017)	
	Oliver Marmol	2019–21	1BC (2017–18)	
	Skip Schumaker	2022	SA (San Diego Padres, 2020–21)	
	Joe McEwing	2023	3BC/BN (Chicago White Sox, 2012–2022)	
	Daniel Descalso	2024–present	E (Arizona Diamondbacks, 2023)	

=== Hitting coaches ===
#	Coach	Seasons	Prior role, other notes:	Ref
	Johnny Lewis	1984–89		
	Steve Braun	1990		
	Gaylen Pitts	1991	MI (1980–90)	
	Don Baylor ^{SV∂}	1992		
	Chris Chambliss ^{G∂}	1993–95		
	George Hendrick ^{S∂}	1996–97	MI (1993–95)	
	Dave Parker ^{GSV∂†}	1998	Coach, Anaheim Angels (1997)	
	Mike Easler ^{∂}	1999–2001	H (Boston Red Sox, 1993–94)	
	Mitchell Page	2002–04	MI (1997–2001)	
	Hal McRae ^{S∂}	2005–09	Special assistant to GM, Tampa Bay Devil Rays	
	Mark McGwire ^{GS∂}	2010–12	Major League player (1986–2001)	
	John Mabry	2013–18	AH (2012)	
	Mark Budaska	2018		
	Jeff Albert	2019–22	AH (Houston Astros, 2018)	
	Turner Ward	2023–24	AH (2022)	
	Brant Brown	2025–26	BN (Seattle Mariners, 2024)	
	Joel McKeithan	2027–present	AH (Chicago White Sox, 2025–26)	

==== Assistant hitting coaches ====
#	Coach	Seasons	Prior role, other notes:	Ref
	Mike Aldrete	2008–11	H (Arizona Diamondbacks, 2005–06)	
	John Mabry	2012		
	Bengie Molina ^{G}	2013	Major League player (1998–2010)	
	David Bell	2014	3BC (Chicago Cubs, 2013)	
	Bill Mueller ^{S}	2015, 2017–18	H (Chicago Cubs, 2014)	
	Derrick May	2016	MI (2005–16)	
	George Greer	2018	MI (2015–18)	
	Mark Budaska	2019	H (2018)	
	Jobel Jiménez	2019–21	MI (2007–19)	
	Turner Ward	2022	H (Cincinnati Reds, 2019)	
	Brandon Allen	2023–present	MI (2017–22)	
	Daniel Nicolaisen	2023	MI (2020–22)	
	Casey Chenoweth	2026–present	MI (2023–25)	

=== Pitching coaches ===
#	Coach	Seasons	Prior role, other notes:	Ref
	Mike Roarke	1984–90		
	Joe Coleman ^{∂}	1991–94	BP (California Angels, 1987–90)	
	Mark Riggins	1995	MI (1979–94)	
	Dave Duncan ^{∂}	1996–2011	PT (Oakland Athletics, 1987–95)	
	Derek Lilliquist	2012–17	BP (2011)	
	Mike Maddux	2018–22	PT (Washington Nationals, 2016–17)	
	Dusty Blake	2023–present	SA (2021–22)	

==== Bullpen coaches ====
#	Coach	Seasons	Prior role, other notes:	Ref
	Dave Ricketts	1984–91		
	Gaylen Pitts	1992–94	H (1991)	
	Bob Gibson ^{GCV∂†§}	1995		
	Mark DeJohn	1996–99	MI (1986–95)	
	Marty Mason	2000–10	MI (1986–99)	
	Derek Lilliquist	2011	MI (2002–10)	
	Dyar Miller	2012	MI (1985–86; 1996–2011)	
	Blaise Ilsley	2013–17	MI (2008–12)	
	Bryan Eversgerd	2018–22	PT (AAA-Memphis, 2013–17)	
	Julio Rangel	2023–present	PT (Texas Rangers, 2019–20)	
	Jamie Pogue	2023–present	BC (2012–23)	

==== Assistant pitching coaches ====
#	Coach	Seasons	Prior role, other notes:	Ref
	Julio Rangel	2023–present	PT (Texas Rangers, 2019–20)	
	Dean Kiekhefer	2024–25	MI (2020–23)	
	Kyle Driscoll	2026–present	MI (Arizona Diamondbacks, 2024–25)	

=== First base coaches ===
#	Coach	Seasons	Prior role, other notes:	Ref
	Nick Leyva	1984–85	MI (1978–83)	
	Rich Hacker	1986–88	MI (1982–85)	
	Jim Riggleman	1989–90		
	Dave Collins	1991–93	Major League player (1975–90)	
	José Cardenal	1994–95		
	Dave McKay	1996–2011	1BC (Oakland Athletics, 1989–95)	
	Chris Maloney	2012–15	MI (1991–96; 1998–2001; 2005–11)	
	Bill Mueller	2016	AH (2015)	
	Oliver Marmol	2017–18	MI (2011–16)	
	Stubby Clapp	2019–present	MI (2017–18)	

=== Third base coaches ===
#	Coach	Seasons	Prior role, other notes:	Ref
	Hal Lanier	1984–85		
	Nick Leyva	1986–88	1BC (1984–85)	
	Rich Hacker	1989–90	1BC (1986–88)	
	Bucky Dent ^{∂}	1991–94	M (New York Yankees, 1989–90)	
	Gaylen Pitts	1995		
	Tommie Reynolds	1996		
	Rene Lachemann	1997–99	M (Florida Marlins, 1993–96)	
	José Oquendo	2000–15, 2018, 2020	BN (1999)	
	Chris Maloney	2016–17	1BC (2012–15)	
	Mike Shildt	2017	QC; MI Cardinals' farm system 8 yrs, (2009–16)	
	Ron 'Pop' Warner	2019–present	BN (2018)	

=== Bullpen catchers ===
#	Coach	Seasons	Prior role, other notes:	Ref
	Jamie Pogue	2012–23		
	Kleininger Teran	2015–present	MI (2006–14)	

=== Assistant coaches ===
#	Coach	Seasons	Prior role, other notes:	Ref
	Gaylen Pitts	2009–17	Assistant for player development; MI (2008)	
	Ron 'Pop' Warner	2017	MI (2001–17)	
	Willie McGee ^{G, S, MVP ∂}	2018–24	Assistant to GM John Mozeliak (2013–17)	
	Packy Elkins	2020–25	Scout (2015–19)	
	Roberto Espinoza	2020	MI (2013–19)	
	Russ Steinhorn	2020	MI (2019)	
	Dusty Blake	2021–22		
	Jon Jay	2025–present	1BC (Miami Marlins, 2023–24)	

=== Unspecified roles ===
Coach	Seasons	Prior role, other notes:	Ref
Charley O'Leary *	1913–17	MI (1912)	
Heinie Peitz *	1913	Coach (Cincinnati Reds, 1912)	
Newt Hunter	1920	MI (1903–18)	
Joe Sugden *	1921–25	Major League player (1893–1912)	
Roy Thomas	1922	MI (1922)	
Burt Shotton *	1923–25	Major League player (1909–23)	
Tink Turner	1924	MI (1913–16)	
Bill Killefer	1926	M (Chicago Cubs, 1921–25)	
Otto Williams *	1926–27	Coach (Detroit Tigers, 1925)	
Bill McKechnie ^{M‡}	1927	M (Pittsburgh Pirates, 1922–26)	
Allen Sothoron *	1927–28	Major League player (1914–26)	
Jack Onslow	1928	Coach (Washington Senators, 1927)	
Greasy Neale	1929	MI (1927–28)	
Ray Blades *^{M}	1930–32, 1951		
Buzzy Wares	1930–52		
Mike González *^{M}	1934–46	MI (1933)	
Tony Kaufmann	1946–50	MI (1941–42)	
Terry Moore *^{∂}	1949–52, 1956–58	Major League player (1935–48)	
Marty Marion *^{MV∂}	1950	Major League player (1940–50)	
Mike Ryba *	1951–55	MI (1925–50)	
Johnny Riddle	1952–55	Coach (Pittsburgh Pirates, 1948–50)	
Dixie Walker ^{∂}	1953, 1955	MI (1950–53, 1954–55)	
Lou Kahn	1954–55	MI (1936–53)	
Bill Posedel	1954–57	1BC (Pittsburgh Pirates, 1949–53)	
Johnny Hopp *^{∂}	1956	MI (1955)	
Walker Cooper *^{∂}	1957	Major League player (1940–57)	
Al Hollingsworth	1957–58	MI (1948–53)	
Ray Katt *	1959–61	Major league player (1952–59)	
Johnny Keane ^{M}	1959–61	MI (1930–58)	
Harry Walker *^{M∂}	1959–62	MI (1956–58)	
Howie Pollet *^{∂}	1959–64	Major League player (1941–56)	
Darrell Johnson *	1960–61	Major league player (1952–60)	
Red Schoendienst *^{M∂†§}	1962–65, 1979–95	Major League player (1945–63), coach (Oakland Athletics, 1977–78)	
Hal Smith *^{∂}	1962	Major League player (1959–61)	
Joe Schultz, Jr.	1963–68	MI (1958–62)	
Vern Benson *	1964–65, 1970–75	MI (1956–61)	
Bob Milliken	1965–70, 1976	Major league player (1953–54)	
Mickey Vernon ^{∂}	1965	H (Pittsburgh Pirates, 1964)	
Dick Sisler *^{∂}	1966–70	M (Cincinnati Reds, 1964–65)	
Billy Muffett *	1967–70	Major league player (1957–62)	
Bart Zeller *	1970	MI (1963–69)	
Ken Boyer *^{MGV∂}	1971–72	MI (1970)	
Barney Schultz *	1971–75	Major League Player (1955–65)	
Lee Thomas ^{∂}	1972, 1983	MI (1970, 1974)	
Johnny Lewis *	1973–76, 1984–89	Major League player (1964–67)	
Dave Ricketts *	1974–75, 1978–91	BP (Pittsburgh Pirates, 1970–73); MI (1976–77)	
Tony Auferio	1975		
Fred Koenig	1976	MI (1951–72)	
Preston Gómez	1976	M (Houston Astros, 1974–75)	
Jack Krol ^{M}	1977–80	MI (1954–76)	
Mo Mozzali	1977–78	Minor leagues (1946–58)	
Claude Osteen *^{∂}	1977–80	Major League player (1957–75)	
Sonny Ruberto	1977–78	Minor leagues (1964–76)	
Dal Maxvill *^{EG}	1979–80	Coach (New York Mets, 1978)	
Chuck Hiller	1981–82	Coach (Kansas City Royals, 1976–79)	
Hal Lanier	1981–85	MI (1977–80)	
Joe Cunningham	1982		
Mike Roarke	1984–90	PT (Chicago Cubs, 1976–80)	
Darold Knowles *^{∂}	1983	Major League player (1965–80)	
Steve Braun *	1990		
Gaylen Pitts	1991–95	MI (1964–90)	
Jack Hubbard	1993		
Tommie Reynolds	1996	3BC (Oakland Athletics, 1989–95)	
Carney Lansford ^{S∂}	1997	Coach (Oakland Athletics, 1994–95)	

== Related lists ==
- St. Louis Cardinals all-time roster
- List of St. Louis Cardinals owners and executives
- List of St. Louis Cardinals managers
- List of St. Louis Cardinals seasons

== See also ==
- St. Louis Cardinals Manager and Coaches
- Coach (baseball)
