= Mark DeJohn =

American baseball player (born 1953)

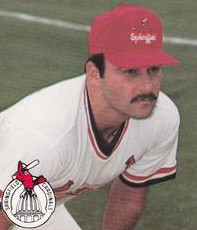
- DeJohn in 1988
- Infielder
- Born: September 18, 1953 (age 71); Middletown, Connecticut, U.S.
- Batted: Switch Threw: Right

MLB debut
- April 28, 1982, for the Detroit Tigers

Last MLB appearance
- June 29, 1982, for the Detroit Tigers

MLB statistics
- Batting average: .190
- Home runs: 0
- Hits: 4
- Stats at Baseball Reference

Teams
- Detroit Tigers (1982)

Mark Stephen DeJohn (born September 18, 1953) is an American professional baseball coach and former infielder and manager.

A switch hitter who threw right-handed, DeJohn stood 5 feet 11 inches (1.80 m) tall and weighed 170 pounds (77 kg). He was born in Middletown, Connecticut.

A former shortstop, DeJohn was chosen by the New York Mets in the 23rd round of the 1971 amateur draft after his graduation from Woodrow Wilson High School in Middletown. He spent seven years in the Mets farm system, including three with the Triple-A Tidewater Tides, before becoming a free agent before the 1978 season.

He eventually signed with the Detroit Tigers, who gave him his only Major League trial at the outset of the 1982 campaign. DeJohn appeared in 24 games, eight of them as starting shortstop.

He collected four hits in 21 at bats for a .190 average, including two doubles, one run, one RBI and one stolen base.

DeJohn began his coaching career in the Detroit minor league system and made his managerial debut in 1985 as one of four managers employed by Detroit's Double-A Birmingham Barons affiliate.

The following season, DeJohn joined the St. Louis Cardinals organization as a full-time minor league skipper. Apart from the 1992 season, when he returned to Detroit to manage the Double-A London Tigers of the Eastern League, DeJohn has been a member of the St. Louis organization since as a minor league manager (1986–91; 2002–09), field coordinator of instruction (1993–95), and coach on Tony LaRussa's Major League staff with the Cardinals during LaRussa's first six seasons as Redbird manager (1996–2001). In 2010, he was re-appointed field coordinator of instruction for the Cardinals and retired after the 2019 season. DeJohn played or coached on professional baseball for 49 years, 33 of those in the Cardinals organization.

== See also ==
- List of St. Louis Cardinals coaches

Preceded by Bob Gibson	St. Louis Cardinals bullpen coach 1996–1999	Succeeded by Marty Mason
Preceded by Jose Oquendo	St. Louis Cardinals bench coach 2000–2001	Succeeded by Joe Pettini
