= Kyle Driscoll =

American baseball player and coach

St. Louis Cardinals – No. 86
- Coach
- Born: February 20, 1994
- Bats: Right Throws: Right

Teams
- St. Louis Cardinals (2026–present)

Kyle Driscoll (born February 20, 1994) is an American professional baseball coach who is an assistant pitching coach for the St. Louis Cardinals of Major League Baseball (MLB). He played college baseball for the Rutgers Scarlet Knights, standing 6 feet 7 inches (2.01 m) and weighing 220 pounds (99 kg).

== Early life ==
Raised in Toms River, New Jersey, Driscoll attended Toms River High School South. He played college baseball for the Rutgers Scarlet Knights from 2013 to 2017.

== Coaching career ==
From 2018 to 2019, Driscoll worked as a pitching coordinator and strength and conditioning coach for Cressey Sports Performance. From 2020 to 2023, he worked in a variety of roles with the New York Mets: pitching and movement analyst in 2020, pitching movement and rehabilitation coordinator in 2021, complex pitching coordinator in 2022, and pitching coach for the Triple-A Syracuse Mets in 2023.

From 2024 to 2025, he served as the minor league pitching coordinator for the Arizona Diamondbacks.

In 2026, he joined the St. Louis Cardinals as an assistant pitching coach, serving alongside Julio Rangel under pitching coach Dusty Blake.

== See also ==
- List of St. Louis Cardinals coaches
