= Jamie Pogue =

Canadian baseball coach (born 1977)

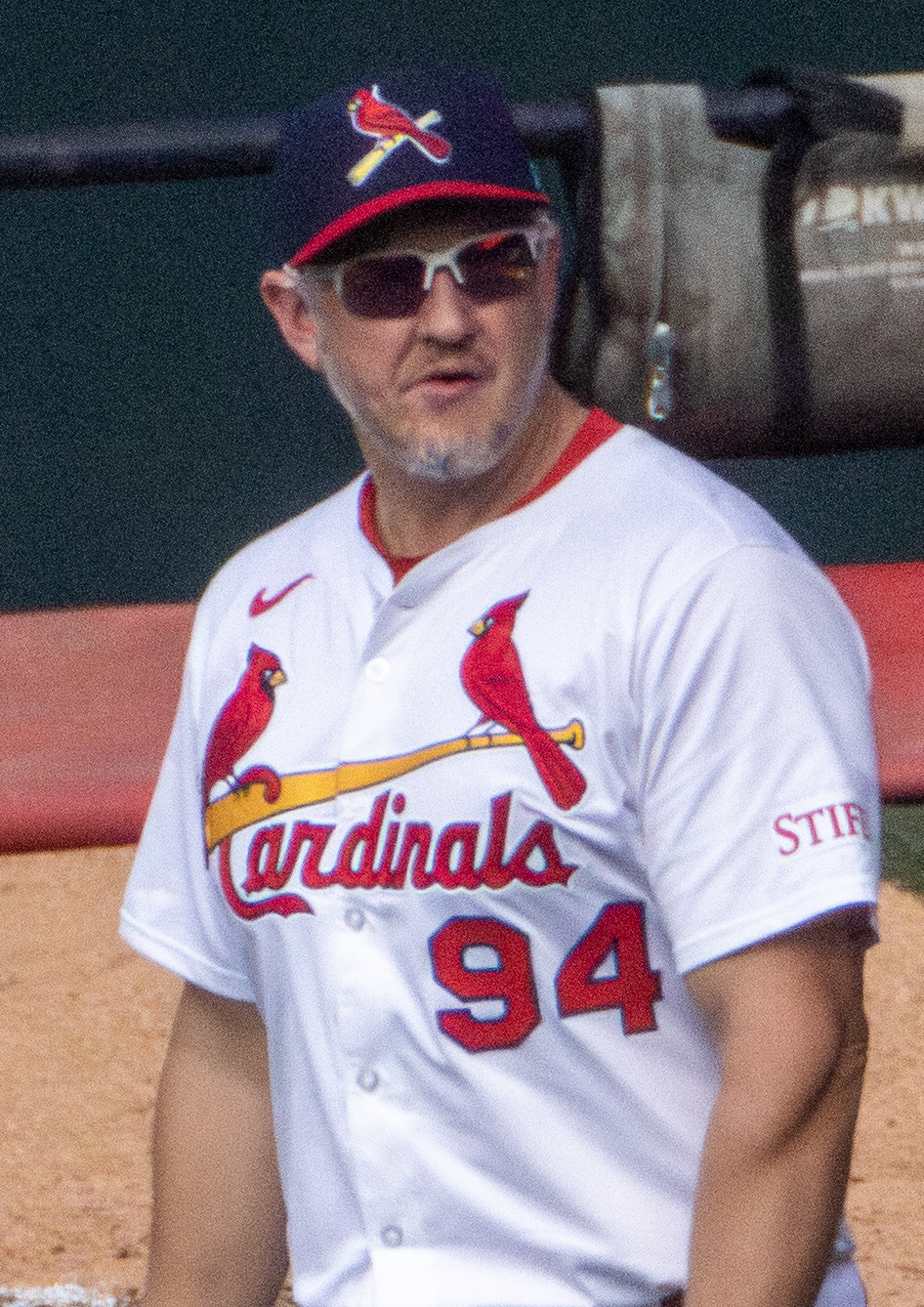
- Pogue with the St. Louis Cardinals

St. Louis Cardinals – No. 94
- Coach
- Born: August 17, 1977 (age 49); Guelph, Ontario, Canada
- Bats: Right Throws: Right
- Stats at Baseball Reference

Teams
- St. Louis Cardinals (2012–present)

Career highlights and awards
- All-Gulf South Conference (1999)

Jamie David Pogue (born August 17, 1977) is a Canadian professional baseball coach who is an assistant coach and bullpen coach for the St. Louis Cardinals of Major League Baseball (MLB).

== Career ==
Pogue began his collegiate career at Old Dominion University, where he played college baseball for the Old Dominion Monarchs. He transferred to Southern Arkansas University for his senior year and played for the Southern Arkansas Muleriders. In his senior year, he was named All-Gulf South Conference. He played minor league baseball for nine seasons. He spent three years in the St. Louis Cardinals' organization, and the other six in independent league baseball. Pogue retired as a player in 2008.

Pogue served as the bullpen catcher for the United States national baseball team in the 2009 World Baseball Classic. In 2012, Pogue became a bullpen catcher for the Cardinals. In the middle of the 2023 season, he transitioned to an assistant coach and bullpen coach, serving the latter with Julio Rangel.

== Personal life ==
Pogue and his wife, Jeanne, have three daughters, Selena, Madyson, and Skylinn.

== See also ==
- List of St. Louis Cardinals coaches
