= Blaise Ilsley =

American baseball player (born 1964)

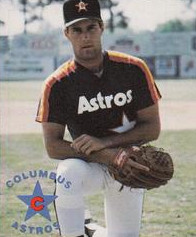
- Ilsley in 1988
- Pitcher
- Born: April 9, 1964 (age 62); Alpena, Michigan, U.S.
- Batted: Left Threw: Left

MLB debut
- April 4, 1994, for the Chicago Cubs

Last MLB appearance
- July 7, 1994, for the Chicago Cubs

MLB statistics
- Win–loss record: 0–0
- Earned run average: 7.80
- Strikeouts: 9
- Stats at Baseball Reference

Teams
- As player: Chicago Cubs (1994); As coach: St. Louis Cardinals (2012–2017)

Blaise Francis Ilsley (born April 9, 1964) is an American former professional baseball left-handed pitcher who played in 1994 with the Chicago Cubs, and was bullpen coach for the St. Louis Cardinals.

== Early and personal life ==
Ilsley was born on April 9, 1964, in Alpena, Michigan. He was drafted in the 4th round by the Montreal Expos in the 1985 Major League Baseball draft after three seasons at Indiana State University.

== Playing career ==
Illsley gained notice as a future big league prospect when he won 20 games in the minors during the 1986 season. Subsequent arm injuries hurt his career and he was released by the Houston Astros organization.

Ilsley spent seven seasons in the Astros farm system being signed as a free agent by the St. Louis Cardinals in December 1991. In the fall of 1992 Ilsley again became a free agent and signed with the Cubs in October of that year.

Ilsley was on the Cubs 1994 Opening day roster and appeared in 10 games that season. After being demoted to the minor leagues on July 7, 1994, Ilsley played four more years of professional baseball but never made it back to the Major Leagues.

Ilsley spent 14 seasons in the minor leagues, accumulating an overall record of 113–73; winning 3 AAA Championships (1991 - Tucson Toros, 1993 - Iowa Cubs and 1997 - Buffalo Bisons). He finished his career by winning the Northern League championship with the 1998 Fargo-Moorhead RedHawks

Ilsley was a pitching coach in the minor leagues from 1999 to 2012, mainly in the St. Louis Cardinals organization. He won league titles with the Bluefield Orioles in 2001, the Tennessee Smokies in 2004 and with the Memphis Redbirds in 2009.

== Coaching career ==
After his playing days were over, Ilsley has worked as a minor league pitching coach for the St. Louis Cardinals organization. After five seasons as pitching coach for the Cardinals Triple-A Memphis Redbirds, Ilsley was promoted to bullpen coach for the Cardinals in November, 2012. He replaced Dyar Miller, who served one season in the position.

== See also ==
- List of St. Louis Cardinals coaches
