= Pop Warner (disambiguation) =

Pop Warner (1871–1954) was an American college football coach.

Pop Warner may also refer to:

- Pop Warner Little Scholars, a non-profit organization named after the coach that offers youth American football and cheerleading and dance programs
- Ron Warner (baseball), third base coach for the St. Louis Cardinals
- Pop Warner Trophy
