= Jobel Jiménez =

Venezuelan baseball player (born 1974)

Los Angeles Angels – No. 81
- Coach
- Born: November 27, 1974 (age 51); Venezuela

Teams
- St. Louis Cardinals (2019–2021); Los Angeles Angels (2026-present)

Jobel Jiménez (born November 27, 1974) is a Venezuelan professional baseball coach. He previously served as the assistant hitting coach for the St. Louis Cardinals of Major League Baseball (MLB).

== Career ==
Jiménez played in Minor League Baseball for the Los Angeles Dodgers organization for two seasons, in 1993 and 1994. After his playing career, he worked as a scout and outfield instructor for the Dodgers. He then coached in the Seattle Mariners and Boston Red Sox organizations. He joined the Cardinals organization in 2007.

In August 2019, the Cardinals fired Mark Budaska as assistant hitting coach and promoted Jiménez from the Memphis Redbirds of the Class AAA Pacific Coast League to take Budaska's place on the major league coaching staff.

On November 1, 2021, the Cardinals announced that Jiménez would not be returning to the organization in 2022. Jiménez was reportedly offered a role as a roving minor league instructor following his firing, but declined.

In 2026, Jimenez was hired as an assistant hitting coach for the Los Angeles Angels.
