= Mark Budaska =

American baseball player and coach (born 1952)

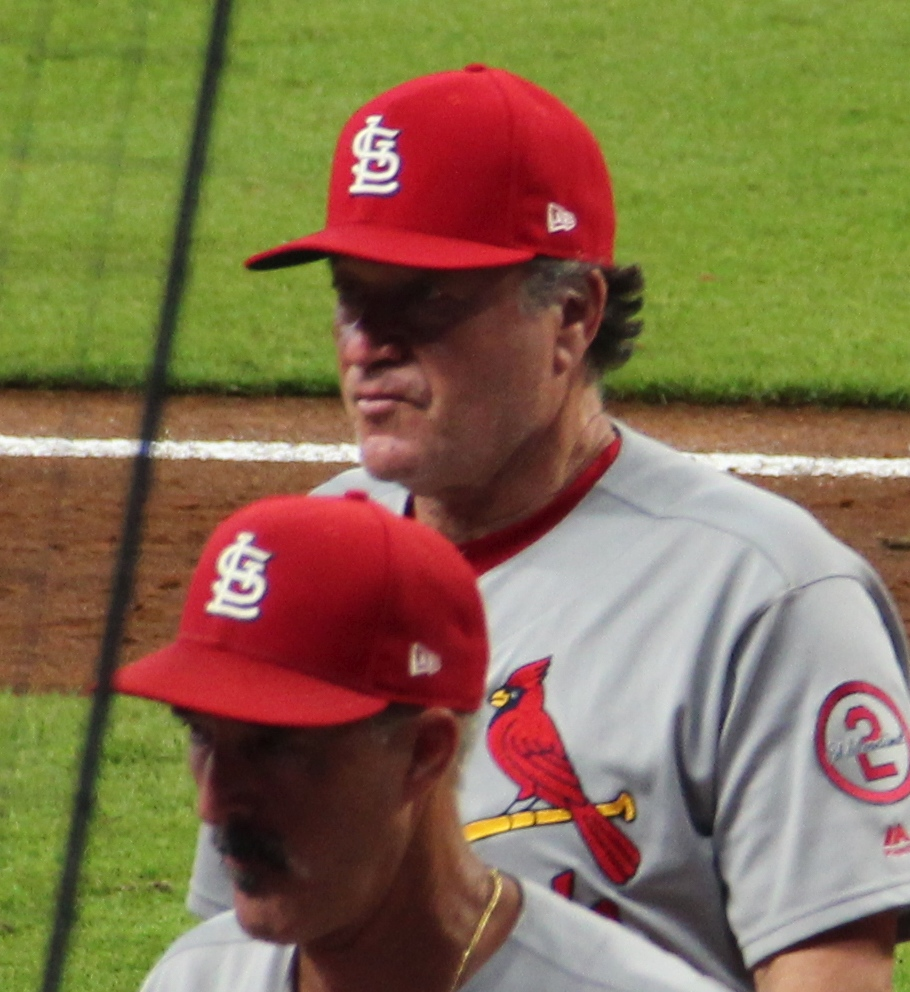
- Budaska in 2018
- Outfielder / Coach
- Born: December 27, 1952 (age 72); Sharon, Pennsylvania, U.S.
- Batted: Switch Threw: Left

MLB debut
- June 6, 1978, for the Oakland Athletics

Last MLB appearance
- August 18, 1981, for the Oakland Athletics

MLB statistics
- Batting average: .167
- Hits: 6
- Home Runs: 0

NPB statistics
- Batting average: .208
- Hits: 3
- Home Runs: 17
- Stats at Baseball Reference

Teams
- Oakland Athletics (1978, 1981); Yokohama Taiyo Whales (1982); As Coach: St. Louis Cardinals (2017–2019)

Mark David Budaska (born December 27, 1952) is an American former professional baseball outfielder and hitting coach. He played in Major League Baseball (MLB) for the Oakland Athletics and in Nippon Professional Baseball (NPB) for the Yokohama Taiyo Whales, and he coached in MLB for the St. Louis Cardinals.

== Early and personal life ==
Budaska was born on December 27, 1952, in Sharon, Pennsylvania. He is an alumnus of Granada Hills (CA) High School. He was undrafted and was signed by the Oakland Athletics as an amateur free agent in 1973.

== Career ==
=== Playing career ===
Budaska played five seasons at the Triple-A level, but just 13 games in the Major Leagues. He played his final MLB game on August 18, 1981.

=== Coaching career ===
Budaska spent a decade (2008-2017) as the hitting coach for the Memphis Redbirds, the Triple-A affiliate of the Cardinals. Prior to joining the Memphis coaching staff in 2008, Budaska spent six years in the Boston Red Sox organization, including four seasons (2004–2007) with Triple-A Pawtucket Red Sox in the International League. In 2002–2003, he was the hitting coach of the Double-A Portland Sea Dogs. In 2001, he helped the Anaheim Angels' Double-A affiliate Arkansas Travelers win the Texas League Championship, as the team ranked fourth in the league with a .266 team batting average. He also served as hitting coach and first base coach for a major league team in Taiwan from 1998 to 2000, and he coached in Venezuela during several offseasons. He served as the assistant hitting coach with the St. Louis Cardinals for several weeks in the first half of the 2017 season while Bill Mueller was on personal leave. He then returned to their Triple-A Memphis Redbirds as hitting coach.

Budaska replaced John Mabry as hitting coach for the St. Louis Cardinals on July 15, 2018. The Cardinals hired Jeff Albert as their hitting coach after the 2018 season, and retained Budaska as assistant hitting coach. The Cardinals fired Budaska in August 2019, and replaced him with Jobel Jiménez.
