= Buzzy Wares =

American baseball player (1886-1964)

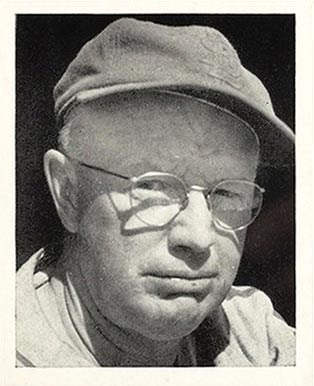
- Wares as Cardinals coach
- Shortstop / Second baseman
- Born: March 23, 1886; Newberg Township, Michigan, U.S.
- Died: May 26, 1964 (aged 78); South Bend, Indiana, U.S.
- Batted: Right Threw: Right

MLB debut
- September 15, 1913, for the St. Louis Browns

Last MLB appearance
- September 27, 1914, for the St. Louis Browns

MLB statistics
- Batting average: .220
- Hits: 55
- Runs batted in: 24
- Stats at Baseball Reference

Teams
- As player: St. Louis Browns (1913–1914); As coach: St. Louis Cardinals (1930–1952)

Career highlights and awards
- 5× World Series champion (1931, 1934, 1942, 1944, 1946)

Clyde Ellsworth "Buzzy" Wares (March 23, 1886 – May 26, 1964) was an American Major League Baseball shortstop during the second decade of the 20th century and a longtime coach in the Majors. Born in Newberg Township, Michigan, Wares attended Kalamazoo College. He stood 5 ft 10 in (1.78 m) (178 cm), weighed 160 pounds (72.6 kg), and threw and batted right-handed.

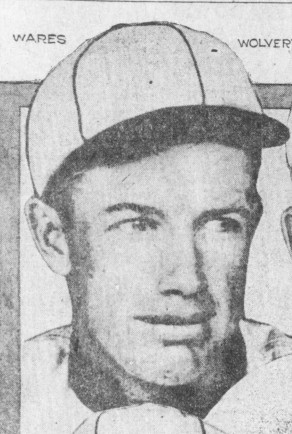
Wares in 1911

Wares played only one month and one full season of Major League ball. He came to the St. Louis Browns of the American League late in the 1913 campaign, and stayed through 1914. He appeared in 90 games, and batted .220 in 250 at bats, with 55 hits, no home runs and 24 runs batted in. His manager, however, was Branch Rickey, and when Rickey was the general manager of the St. Louis Cardinals of the National League, he hired Wares as a coach in 1930. Wares would remain on the Redbirds' staff through 1952, a string of 23 consecutive seasons, during which time St. Louis won seven NL pennants and five World Series. Wares worked under eight different Cardinal managers in that span.

During his minor league playing career (1905–20), Wares twice led his league in fielding percentage, although he did commit a league-leading 107 errors in 224 games played for Oakland of the Pacific Coast League in 1910. That season, however, Wares led the PCL with 790 assists, and had 1,287 total chances, for a fielding percentage of .917.

Buzzy Wares died at age 78 in South Bend, Indiana.

== See also ==
- List of St. Louis Cardinals coaches

== Bibliography ==
- Spink, J.G. Taylor, ed., The Baseball Register. St. Louis: The Sporting News, 1949.
