= Gaylen Pitts =

American baseball manager, coach and player (1946–2024)

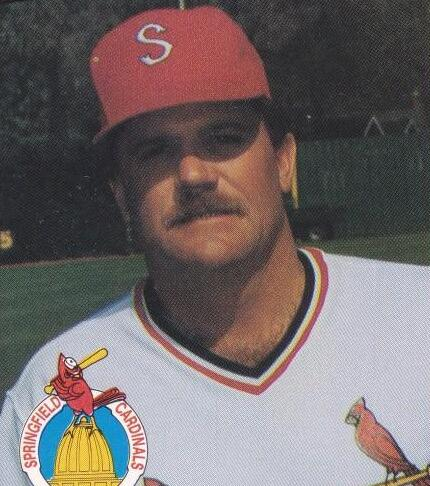
- Pitts as manager of the Springfield Cardinals c. 1987
- Infielder
- Born: June 6, 1946; Wichita, Kansas, U.S.
- Died: October 10, 2024 (aged 78); Santa Fe, New Mexico, U.S.
- Batted: Right Threw: Right

MLB debut
- May 12, 1974, for the Oakland Athletics

Last MLB appearance
- September 25, 1975, for the Oakland Athletics

MLB statistics
- Batting average: .250
- Home runs: 0
- Runs batted in: 4

Teams
- Oakland Athletics (1974–1975)

Gaylen Richard Pitts (June 6, 1946 – October 10, 2024) was an American professional baseball player, manager and baseball coach. He played in Major League Baseball (MLB) for the Oakland Athletics, and coached in the St. Louis Cardinals organization.

== Playing career (1964–77) ==
As a player, Pitts threw and batted right-handed, stood 6 ft 1 in (1.85 m) tall and weighed 175 pounds (79 kg). Pitts signed with St. Louis as a shortstop in 1964 after graduating from Mountain Home High School in Arkansas, and reached the Triple-A level with the Tulsa Oilers of the American Association in 1970. The following season, he was acquired by Oakland in a minor league transaction.

Pitts' Major League experience came with the Oakland Athletics during brief call-ups during the 1974 and 1975 seasons. He appeared in 28 games, batted 44 times, and compiled a batting average of .250, with four doubles and four runs batted in. However, Pitts spent most of his career in the Cardinals' organization.

In the minor leagues, Pitts played all four infield positions for 11 total seasons spanning from 1964 to 1977.

== Coaching and managing career (1978–2008) ==
Pitts' managing career began with two seasons (1978–1979) in the A's farm system managing the Modesto A's. He returned to the Cardinals in 1981 as a minor-league manager and spent most of his career with the club. With extensive experience in the minor leagues as a skipper and a roving instructor, Pitts managed at Arkansas in 1981, 1982 and 1989, Savannah in 1985, the Springfield in 1986–87 and Johnson City. He guided Springfield to division titles in 1986 and 1987 and Arkansas to a league championship in 1989, earning him Texas League Manager of the Year honors.

Pitts' first five years coaching for the Major League club occurred from (1991 to 1995) on Joe Torre's staff when Torre was the manager of the Redbirds. His coaching roles included hitting (1991), bullpen (1992 St. Louis Cardinals season), bench coach in 1995.

Perhaps his greatest accomplishment was winning the 2000 Pacific Coast League Championship as manager of the Triple A St. Louis Cardinals affiliate, the Memphis Redbirds. In extra innings, Albert Pujols who was at the time 20 years old, hit a walk-off home run to win the title.

During his most recent managerial assignment, he was the 2008 manager of the Palm Beach Cardinals, St. Louis' High-A affiliate in the Florida State League. He opened the 2009 season as the Cards' special assistant for player development and served in that role until joining Matheny's staff.

Pitts managed 19 years in the minor leagues and posted a 1,359-1.298 (.511) record.

== Personal life and death ==
Pitts lived in Mountain Home, Arkansas. His hobbies included skiing, racquetball and trout fishing.

Pitts and his wife, Julia, moved to Santa Fe, New Mexico in 2019. Julia died in 2022. Pitts died in Santa Fe on October 10, 2024, at the age of 78.

== See also ==
- List of St. Louis Cardinals coaches
