= Dave Ricketts =

American baseball player (1935–2008)

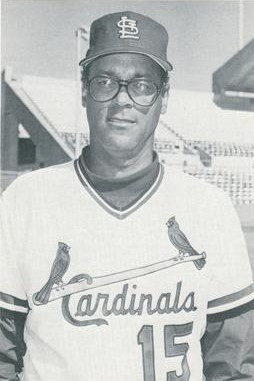
- Catcher
- Born: July 12, 1935; Pottstown, Pennsylvania, U.S.
- Died: July 13, 2008 (aged 73); St. Louis, Missouri, U.S.
- Batted: Switch Threw: Right

MLB debut
- September 25, 1963, for the St. Louis Cardinals

Last MLB appearance
- July 30, 1970, for the Pittsburgh Pirates

MLB statistics
- Batting average: .249
- Home runs: 1
- Runs batted in: 20
- Stats at Baseball Reference

Teams
- St. Louis Cardinals (1963, 1965, 1967–1969); Pittsburgh Pirates (1970)

Career highlights and awards
- 3× World Series champion (1967, 1971, 1982)

David William Ricketts (July 12, 1935 – July 13, 2008) was an American catcher and coach in Major League Baseball who played parts of six seasons (1963, 1965, 1967–1970) with the St. Louis Cardinals and Pittsburgh Pirates. Ricketts was a reserve catcher on the 1967 World Series champion Cardinals and their 1968 pennant winners. He later served as a longtime bullpen coach of the Cardinals (1974–1975, 1978–1991), including their 1982 World Series champions and 1985 and 1987 pennant winners, after having been the bullpen coach for the Pirates from 1971 to 1973, including the 1971 World Series champions. Over his career, he batted .249 with 1 home run and 20 runs batted in in 130 games played.

Ricketts was born in Pottstown, Pennsylvania; his older brother Dick was the first pick in the 1955 NBA draft, and played three years in the National Basketball Association before pitching briefly for the 1959 Cardinals. Dave Ricketts played basketball with his brother at Duquesne University, graduating in 1957 with a degree in education. He married Barbarann Boswell on August 17, 1957, and they had a daughter, Candace, and a son, David Jr., who died of spinal cancer at age 10 in 1972. He served in the military from 1958 to 1959. During his minor league career, he led Pacific Coast League catchers with 12 double plays in 1962 while with the Portland Beavers, and led International League catchers with 11 double plays the following year while with the Atlanta Crackers; he also led the IL in passed balls in both 1963 and 1964, playing for the Jacksonville Suns the latter season.

Ricketts' tenure as a coach with the Cardinals was interrupted by two seasons as a manager in the Cardinals farm system; he led the Sarasota Cardinals to a fourth-place finish in the Gulf Coast League in 1976, and the Johnson City Cardinals to a third-place finish in the Appalachian League in 1977.

Ricketts died of renal cancer on July 13, 2008, one day after his 73rd birthday.
