= Ron Warner (baseball) =

American baseball coach (born 1968)

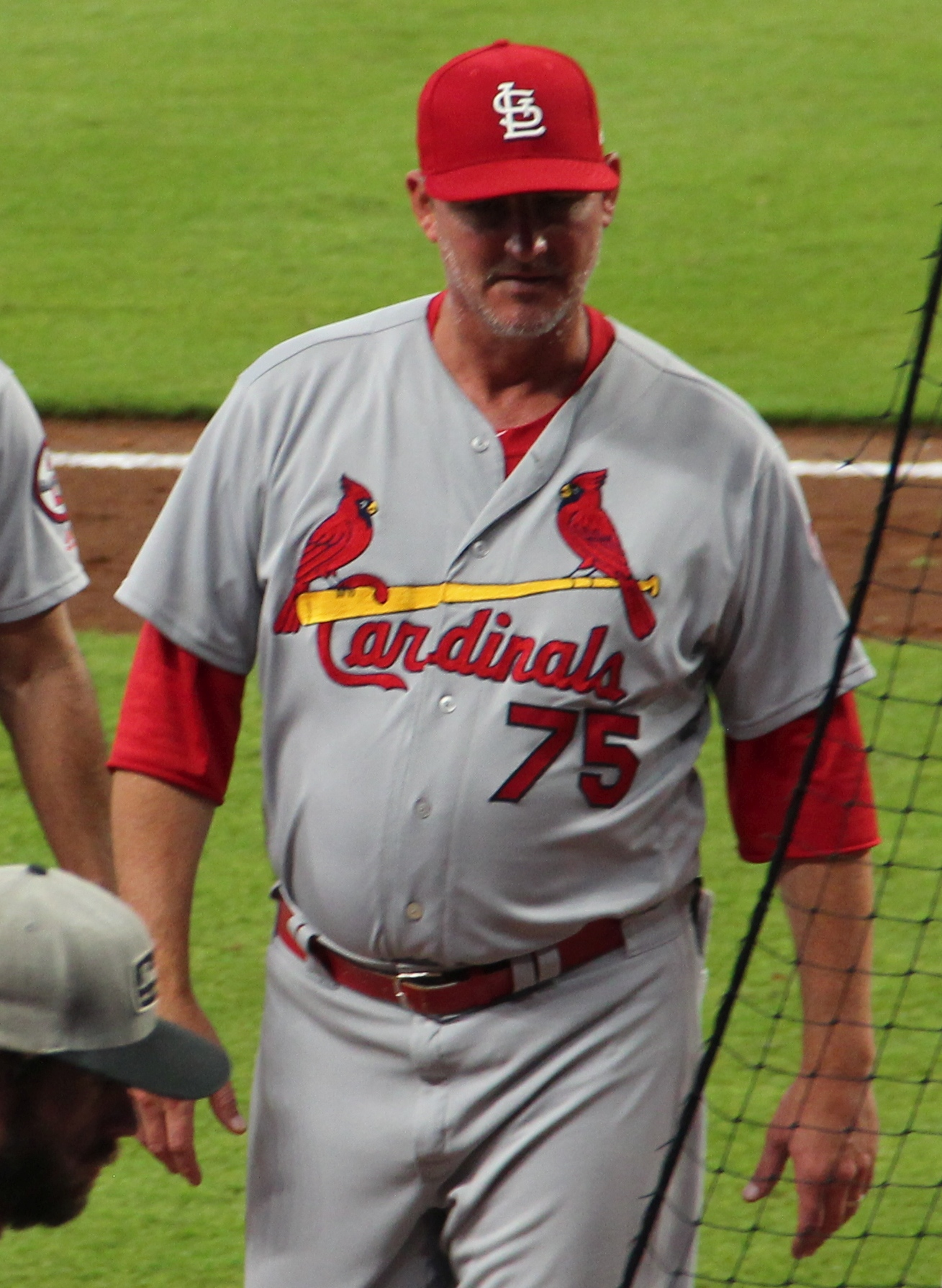
- Warner with the St. Louis Cardinals in 2018

St. Louis Cardinals – No. 75
- Coach
- Born: December 2, 1968 (age 57); Alhambra, California, U.S.
- Stats at Baseball Reference

Teams
- As coach: St. Louis Cardinals (2017–present)

Ronald Michael "Pop" Warner (born December 2, 1968) is an American professional baseball coach and former minor league manager who is the third base coach for the St. Louis Cardinals of Major League Baseball (MLB). His professional career began in 1991 and its entirety has been spent in the Cardinals' organization.

== Biography ==
Ronald Warner grew up in Redlands, California. He attended Moore middle school, where he excelled at both baseball and basketball. He began to get noticed by scouts as early as age 15.

== Career ==
Warner was selected in the 17th round of the 1991 Major League Baseball draft after graduating from the University of Wyoming. During his pro playing career (1991–1999) he played every infield position (although he was primarily a shortstop and second baseman), as well as corner outfield positions, and even pitched in three games. He threw and batted right-handed, stood 6 feet 3 inches (1.91 m) tall and weighed 185 pounds (84 kg). His career peaked at Triple-A with 307 games played between 1997 and 1999 with the Louisville and Memphis Redbirds. In 792 minor league games, he rang up 594 hits, including 40 home runs, and batted .267.

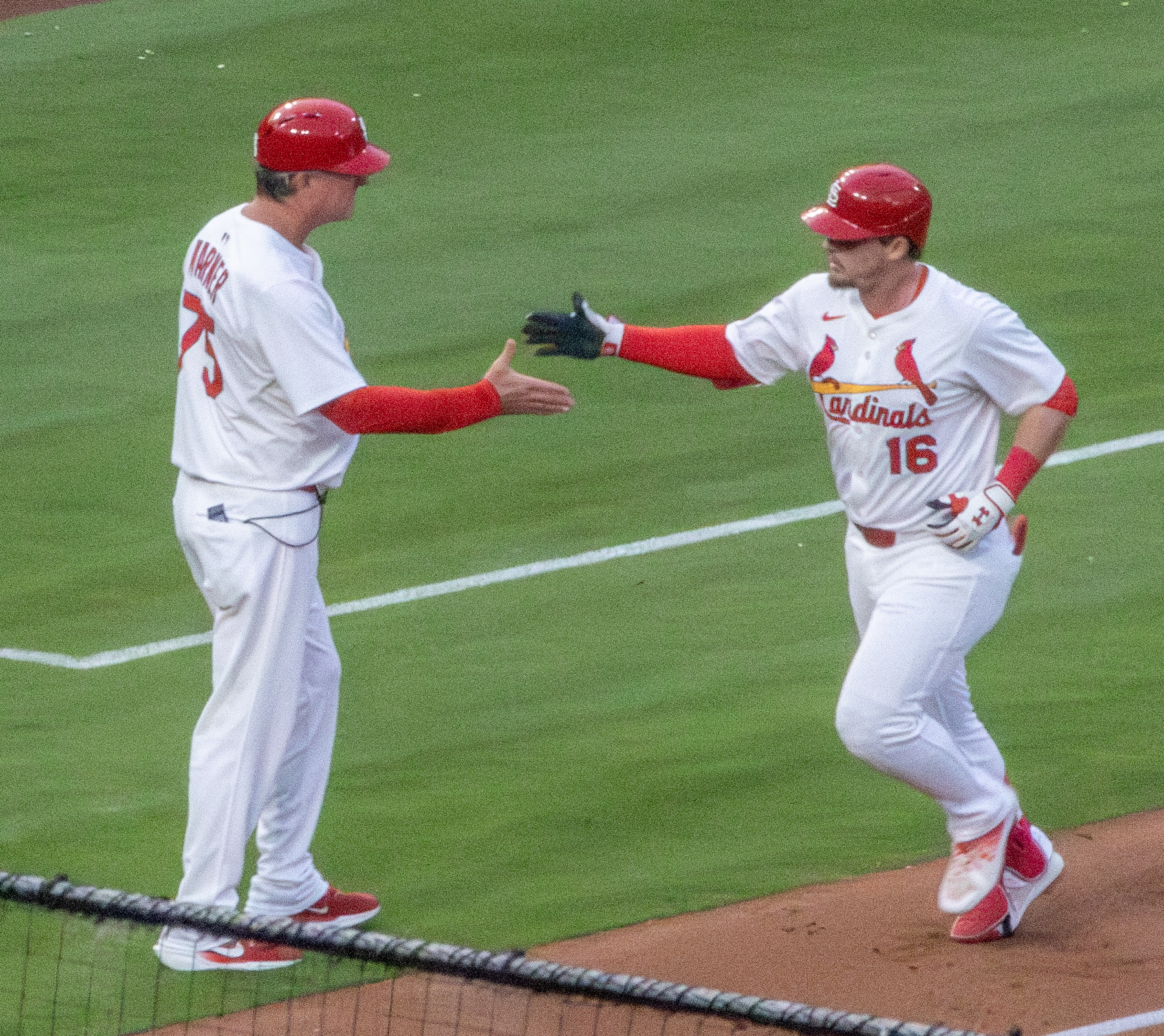
Warner congratulates Nolan Gorman's homerun in 2025.

In 2000, Warner retired as a player and spent the season as the batting practice pitcher for the Major League Cardinals. After working as a minor league coach from 2001 to 2002, he received his first managerial assignment in 2003 in the Rookie-level Appalachian League. He was a minor league coach again in 2004, then resumed his managerial career in the Cardinal farm system in 2005, progressing from Class A (Palm Beach Cardinals) in 2005–2006 to Double-A (Springfield Cardinals) from 2007 to 2011. He was named manager of the Memphis Redbirds on November 21, 2011. On December 10, 2014, Warner was named the Cardinals' roving minor league infield coordinator and was replaced as manager of the Redbirds by Mike Shildt. Through 11 seasons as a manager, Warner has compiled a record of 734–730 (.501).

Midway through the 2017 season, the Cardinals promoted Warner to the big league staff in a general coaching role. He returned to the minors for the following season, but became the Cardinals' bench coach on July 14, 2018, after manager Mike Matheny was fired and bench coach Shildt was named interim manager. For the 2019 season, Warner became third base coach.

Preceded by Chris Maloney	Springfield Cardinals manager 2007–2011	Succeeded by Mike Shildt
Preceded by Chris Maloney	Memphis Redbirds manager 2012–2014	Succeeded by Mike Shildt
