= Dusty Blake =

American baseball coach (born 1982)

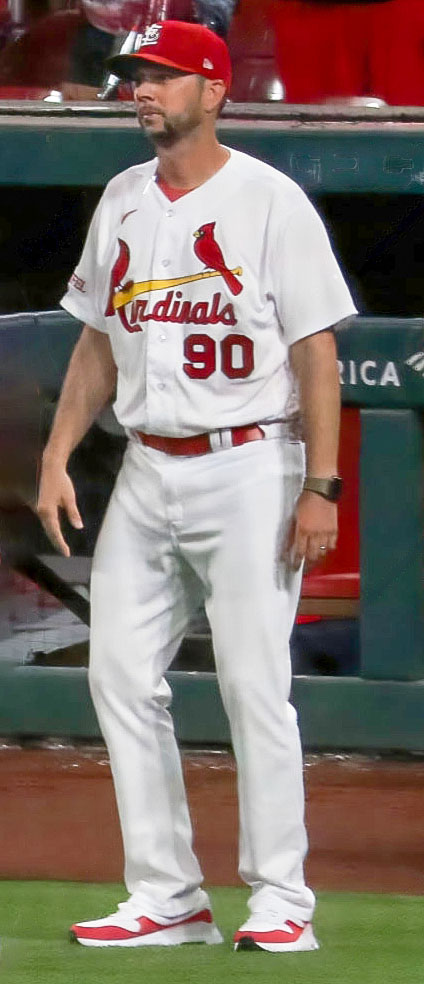
- Blake with the St. Louis Cardinals

St. Louis Cardinals – No. 90
- Coach
- Born: April 26, 1982 (age 44); Candor, North Carolina, U.S.

Teams
- As coach: St. Louis Cardinals (2021–present)

Dusty Blake (born April 26, 1982) is an American professional baseball coach who is the pitching coach for the St. Louis Cardinals of Major League Baseball (MLB).

== Career ==
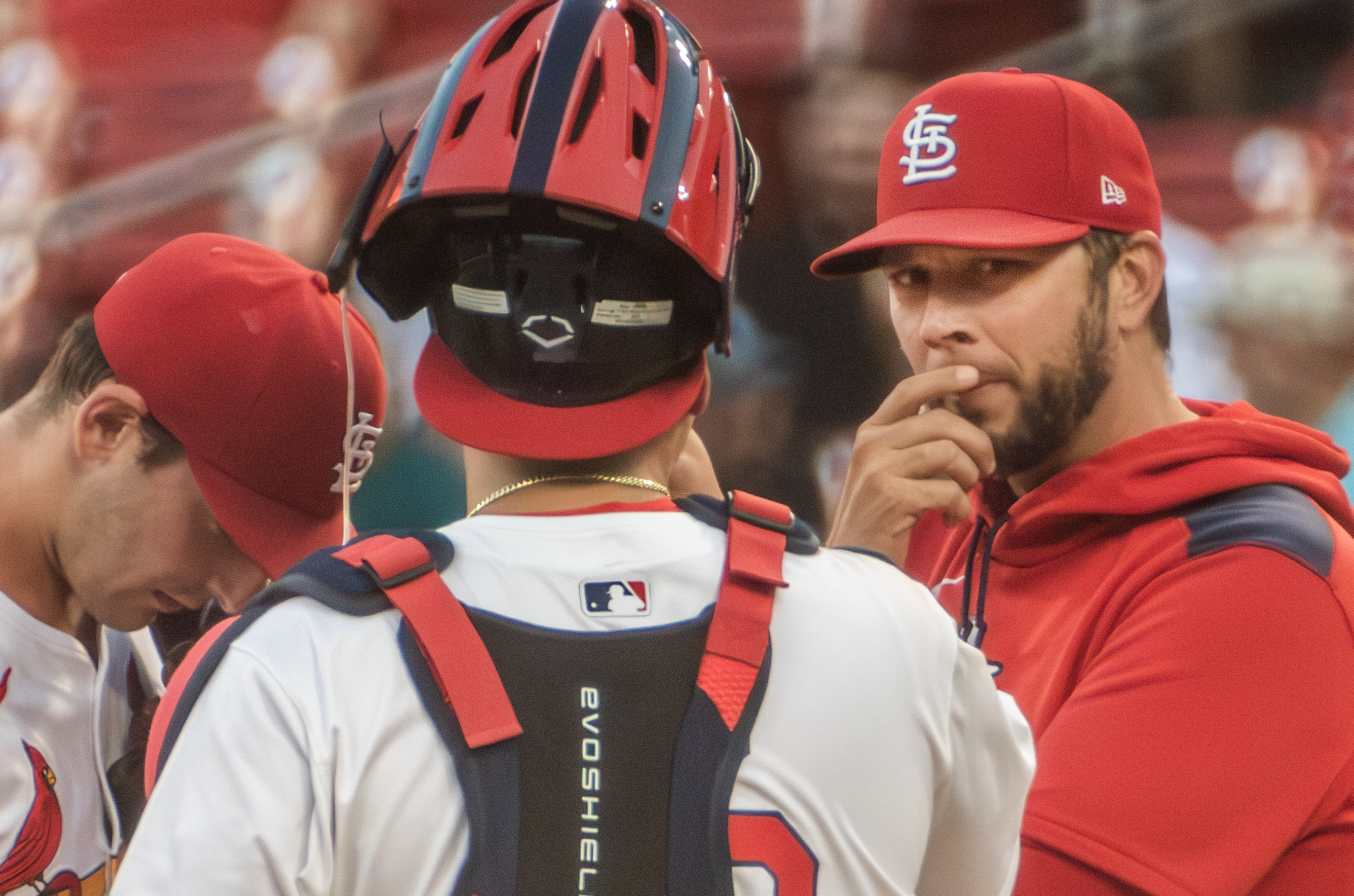
Blake makes a mound visit in 2025.

Blake is from Candor, North Carolina. He enrolled at Appalachian State University and played college baseball for the Appalachian State Mountaineers. He earned his bachelor's degree and master's degree from Appalachian State. He became a pitching coach for Catawba College from 2006 to 2007, Wofford College from 2008 to 2011, and University of South Carolina Upstate in 2012. Blake was hired as the head coach for Pfeiffer University for the 2013 season. He coached at Pfeffer from 2013 to 2017, and then was the pitching coach at Duke University from 2018 to 2020. In 2020, pitcher Bryce Jarvis became the highest-drafted player in Duke Blue Devils history.

In 2021, the Cardinals hired Blake as their pitching strategist. On November 6, 2022, Blake was promoted to pitching coach for the 2023 season.
