= Chris Maloney =

American baseball player & manager (born 1961)

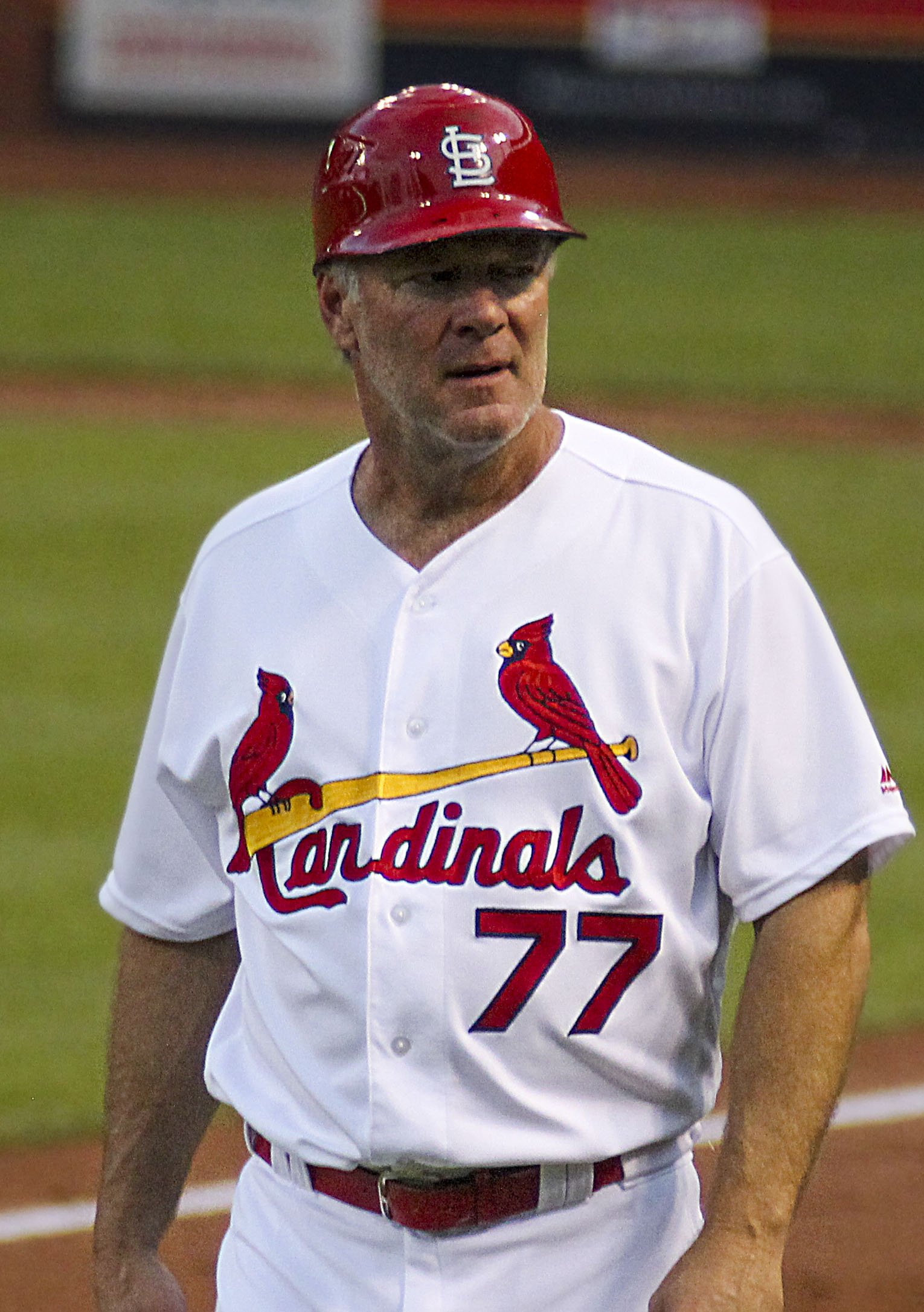
- Maloney with the St. Louis Cardinals in 2016
- Coach
- Born: September 6, 1961 (age 65); Jackson, Mississippi, U.S.
- Bats: Switch Throws: Right
- Stats at Baseball Reference

Teams
- As coach: St. Louis Cardinals (2011–2017)

James Christopher Maloney (born September 6, 1961) is the manager for the Mississippi Braves of Minor League Baseball. A former minor league first baseman and outfielder, he spent five seasons as manager of the Cardinals' Triple-A farm club before his hiring, on November 16, 2011, to serve on the 2012 staff of Cardinals' manager Mike Matheny.

== Early and personal life ==
Maloney was born on September 6, 1961, in Jackson, Mississippi. He graduated from St. Joseph High School in Jackson and from Mississippi State University. He was nicknamed "The Hammer" and "Wally Pipp" during his MSU playing days for his smooth stroke and for being the starting first baseman on State's 1983 squad before contracting a stomach virus early in that campaign. College Baseball Hall of Fame member and MLB All-Star Will Clark took over for the ailing Maloney at first and started every game from mid-1983 through the semifinals of the 1985 NCAA World Series for the Bulldogs.

== Playing career ==
Maloney signed with the New York Mets in 1983 and played four seasons of minor league baseball in the Mets and Cardinals organizations, never rising above the Class A level. In his finest season, 1984 with the Columbia Mets of the South Atlantic League, he batted .324 in 173 at-bats with three home runs and 24 runs batted in. A switch-hitter who threw right-handed, Maloney stood 5 ft 11 in (1.80 m) and weighed 180 pounds (82 kg) during his playing career.

== Manager ==
Maloney became a minor league manager in the Cardinals' system in 1991 with the Rookie-level Johnson City Cardinals of the Appalachian League. In 18 seasons (1991–96; 1998–2009) as a manager, his teams have won 1,191 games and lost 1,121 (.515) with two league championships—including the 2009 PCL playoff title. With the exception of three seasons (2002–04) as manager of the New Orleans Zephyrs, top farm club of the Houston Astros at the time, all of those years have been spent with the Cardinals' organization.

He was announced as taking the job as first base coach for the St. Louis Cardinals on November 16, 2011. Maloney was named third base coach after Jose Oquendo was placed on medical leave of absence on March 27, 2016. He was reassigned in the organization from third base coaching on June 9, 2017. Maloney joined the Atlanta Braves organization in December 2017, as manager of the Double-A Mississippi Braves, a Southern League team.

== See also ==
- List of St. Louis Cardinals coaches
