= Joe Pettini =

American baseball player and coach (born 1955)

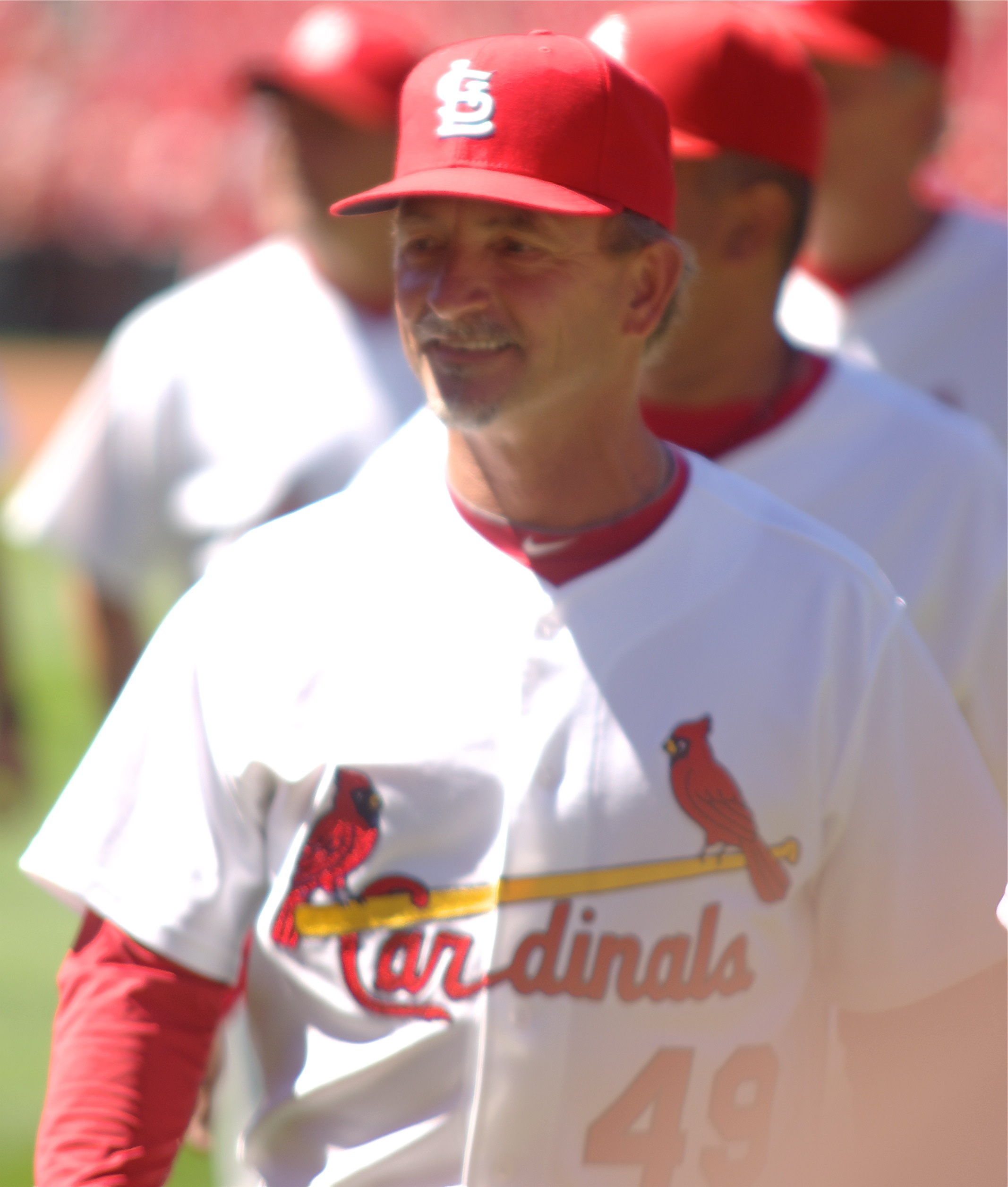
- Pettini as Cardinals' bench coach, 2010
- Infielder
- Born: January 26, 1955 (age 70); Wheeling, West Virginia, U.S.
- Batted: Right Threw: Right

MLB debut
- July 10, 1980, for the San Francisco Giants

Last MLB appearance
- October 2, 1983, for the San Francisco Giants

MLB statistics
- Batting average: .203
- Home runs: 1
- Runs batted in: 20
- Stats at Baseball Reference

Teams
- As player: San Francisco Giants (1980–1983); As coach: St. Louis Cardinals (2002–2011); Houston Astros (2012)

Career highlights and awards
- 2× World Series champion (2006, 2011)

Joseph Paul Pettini (born January 26, 1955) is an American former Major League Baseball player and the former bench coach for the St. Louis Cardinals and Houston Astros.

== Playing career ==
Pettini attended Brooke High School in Wellsburg, West Virginia and Mercer University in Macon, Georgia. He played for the Mercer baseball team, starting 196 consecutive games, but was not selected in the MLB draft. Pettini signed as an undrafted free agent with the Montreal Expos in 1977 after graduating from Mercer. On March 15, 1980, Pettini was sent to the San Francisco Giants as the player to be named later in a 1979 trade where the Giants sent Montreal backup catcher John Tamargo. Pettini made his major-league debut for the Giants on July 10, 1980. He would go on to be a part-time player for the Giants for four seasons, 1980–1983, amassing a total of 344 big-league at-bats and hitting for a .203 average. One of the highlights of Pettini's playing career was his participation in a triple play that the Giants executed against the San Diego Padres on October 3, 1980.

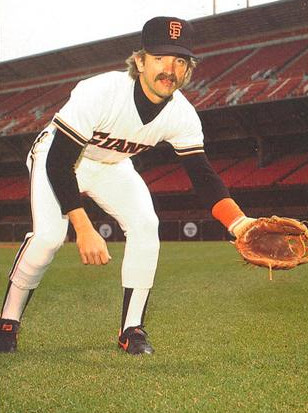
Pettini with the San Francisco Giants

Pettini was an infielder, playing second base, third base and shortstop for the Giants. His final game as a big-league player was October 2, 1983. In 1984, Pettini would sign with the minor-league Louisville Redbirds, then an affiliate of the St. Louis Cardinals, beginning his long association with the organization. Pettini played for Louisville for three seasons.

== Minor league managing and coaching career ==
Pettini stayed with the Cardinals as a coach after his playing career ended in 1988. He started out as a manager with the rookie-level Hamilton franchise in 1989, then moved up the system, managing the Class A St. Petersburg franchise in 1990, the Class AA Little Rock affiliate from 1991 to 1993, and Class AAA Louisville from 1994 to 1996, where he managed the Redbirds to the 1995 American Association championship. Pettini compiled an overall minor-league won-loss record of 475–569.

In 1997 Pettini was promoted to minor league field coordinator for the St. Louis Cardinals organization, where he remained until 2002. As coordinator, he was responsible for organizing the spring training schedules for up to 200 Cardinal minor leaguers every spring, as well as making decisions on what levels Cardinal prospects were sent to, and coaching those prospects during the minor league season.

== Major league coach ==
In 2002, St. Louis Cardinals manager Tony La Russa picked Pettini to be his bench coach. As a bench coach, Pettini helped organize pregame warmups and batting practice. He also set up infield positioning, reviewing with each infielder how he should position himself for each opposition batter. Pettini checked infield positioning during gameplay, and kept a stopwatch to measure the pitchers' release time to the plate.

Pettini earned his first championship ring when the St. Louis Cardinals won the 2006 World Series, defeating the Detroit Tigers four games to one, and a second one when the Cardinals defeated the Texas Rangers four games to three in the 2011 World Series.

On January 11, 2012, Pettini was hired by the Houston Astros as Bench Coach. He was not rehired for the 2013 season.

== Personal life ==
Joe Pettini and his wife Barbara were married in 1981. They had daughter Amy in 1983 and son Joseph in 1987. He attended Brooke High School. Joe and his family now reside in Bethany, West Virginia.
