= Marty Mason =

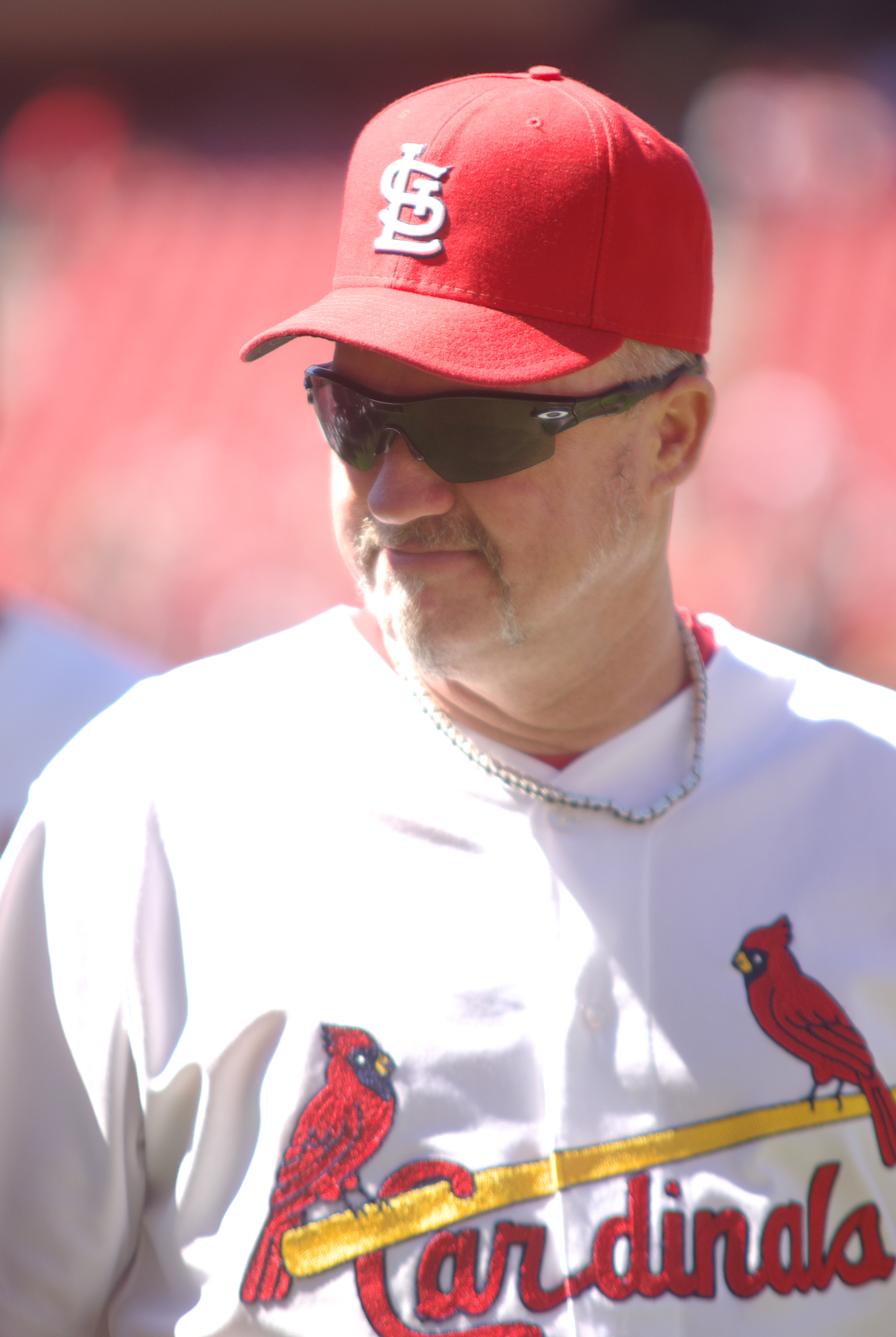
- Mason in 2010

Rochester Red Wings – No. 38
- Pitching Coach
- Born: April 4, 1958 (age 67); Central City, Kentucky
- Bats: Right Throws: Right

Teams
- St. Louis Cardinals (2000–2010)

Career highlights and awards
- World Series champion (2006)

Martin Lee "Marty" Mason (born April 4, 1958, in Central City, Kentucky) is a retired minor league baseball pitcher and former Major League Baseball bullpen coach for the St. Louis Cardinals.

Mason pitched in the minor leagues from 1980 through 1986 in the New York Yankees and Cardinals organizations.

After retiring as a player, Mason remained with the Cardinals organization as a minor league pitching coach from 1987 through 1999. In 2000, he became the bullpen coach for the Cardinals. Mason was dismissed following the 2010 season.

Mason spent the next two years as a pitching coach in the Chicago Cubs organization. On November 17, 2012, Mason was announced as the pitching coach for the Minnesota Twins Triple-A affiliate Rochester.
