= Julio Rangel =

Panamanian baseball coach (born 1975)

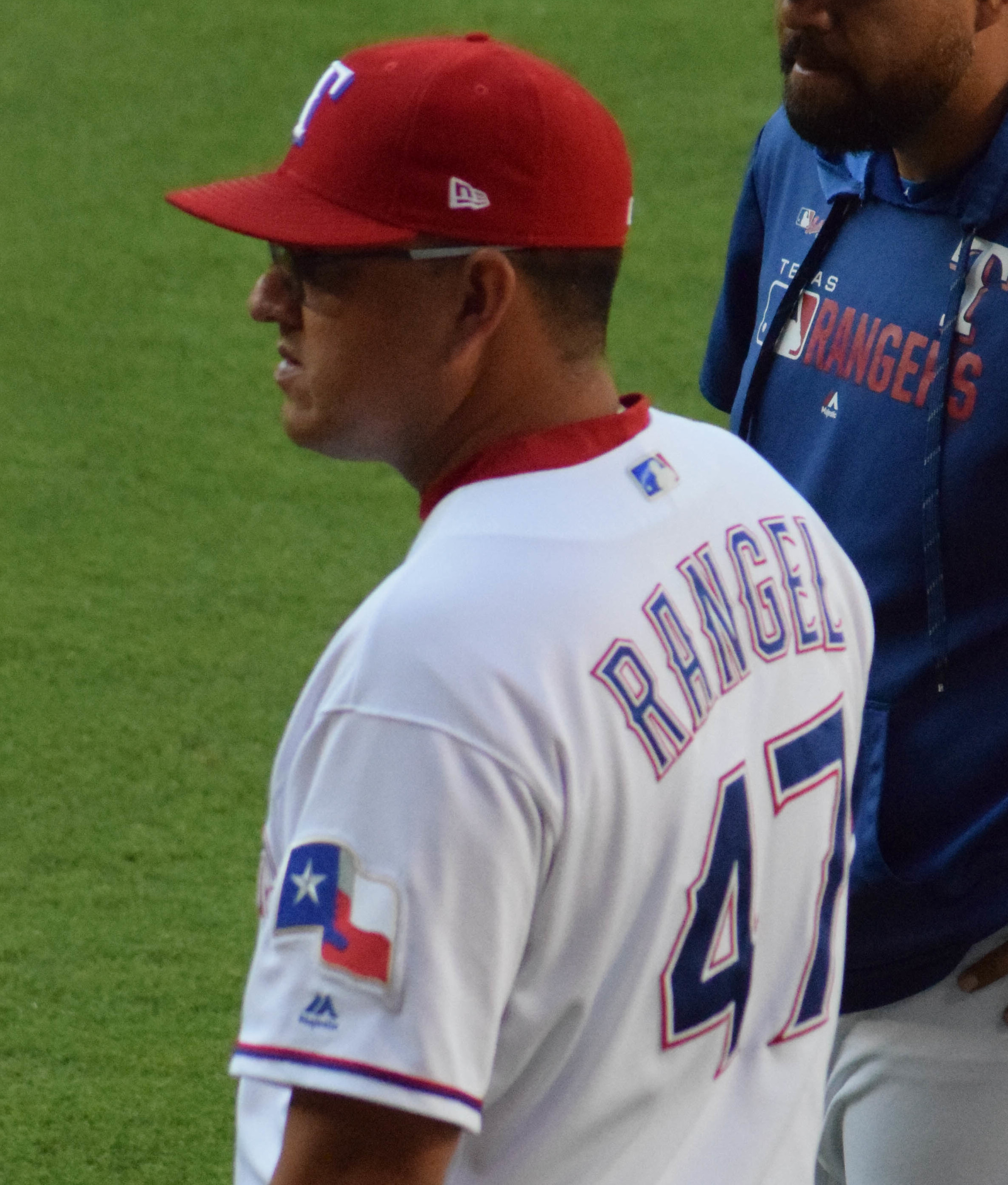
- Rangel with the Rangers in 2019

St. Louis Cardinals – No. 74
- Coach
- Born: September 28, 1975 (age 51); Panama City, Panama
- Stats at Baseball Reference

Teams
- Texas Rangers (2019–2020); St. Louis Cardinals (2023–present)

Julio César Rangel (born September 28, 1975) is a Panamanian professional baseball coach who is the assistant pitching coach and bullpen coach for the St. Louis Cardinals of Major League Baseball (MLB). He has previously coached in MLB for the Texas Rangers.

== Career ==
Rangel played in Minor League Baseball as a pitcher in the New York Yankees organization from 1994 through 2000. He appeared in two games in 2002 for the Berkshire Black Bears of the independent Northern League.

Rangel worked as a coach for the Cleveland Indians organization from 2007 through 2015. His positions included cultural development coordinator and pitching coordinator. He joined the San Francisco Giants organization for the 2018 season as their minor league pitching coordinator. Following the 2018 season, Rangel had accepted the role of bullpen coach for the Cincinnati Reds, but interviewed for the Texas Rangers open pitching coach position at the urging of Reds manager David Bell.

=== Texas Rangers ===
Rangel was hired by the Texas Rangers as their pitching coach on November 16, 2018. Rangel was fired by the Rangers following the 2020 season.

== Personal life ==
Rangel and his family resided in the Tampa, Florida area following his playing career. He worked for a time selling window blinds, before spending four-plus years working in the banking industry. Rangel earned a degree in business administration during that time.
