= Memphis Redbirds =

Minor league baseball team (founded in 1998)

- Founded in 1998; Memphis, Tennessee

Team logo	Cap insignia

Minor league affiliations
- Class: Triple-A (1998–present)
- League: International League (2021–present)
- Division: West Division
- Previous leagues: Pacific Coast League (1998–2020)

Major league affiliations
- Team: St. Louis Cardinals (1998–present)

Minor league titles
- Class titles (1): 2018
- League titles (4): 2000; 2009; 2017; 2018
- Conference titles (5): 2000; 2009; 2010; 2017; 2018
- Division titles (6): 2000; 2009; 2010; 2014; 2017; 2018
- First-half titles (1): 2026

Team data
- Name: Memphis Redbirds (1998–present)
- Colors: Red, navy blue, yellow, white
- Mascot: Rockey the Redbird
- Ballpark: AutoZone Park (2000–present)
- Previous parks: Tim McCarver Stadium (1998–1999)
- Owner/ Operator: Diamond Baseball Holdings
- General manager: Craig Unger
- Manager: Ben Johnson
- Media: MiLB.TV
- Website: mlb.com/milb/memphis

The Memphis Redbirds are a Minor League Baseball team of the International League and the Triple-A affiliate of the St. Louis Cardinals. They are located in Memphis, Tennessee, and are named for their Major League Baseball affiliate. The Redbirds play their home games at AutoZone Park, which opened in 2000 and is located in Downtown Memphis. The team previously played at Tim McCarver Stadium in 1998 and 1999.

The Redbirds were established as an expansion team of the Triple-A Pacific Coast League (PCL) in 1998. In conjunction with Major League Baseball's reorganization of Minor League Baseball in 2021, they were placed in the Triple-A East, which became the International League in 2022. A total of eight managers have led the club and its over 600 players.

As of the end of the 2026 season, the Redbirds have played in 4,013 regular-season games and compiled a win–loss record of 2,025–1,988 (.505). They have appeared in the postseason on seven occasions and won the PCL championship in 2000, 2009, 2017, and 2018. The Redbirds won the Triple-A National Championship Game in 2018. They have a postseason record of 31–22 (.585). Combining all 4,066 regular-season and postseason games, Memphis has an all-time record of 2,056–2,010 (.506).

== History ==
=== Prior professional baseball in Memphis ===
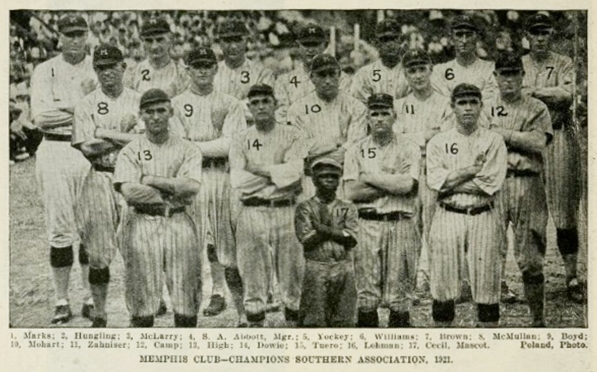
The 1921 Memphis Chicks, champions of the Southern Association

The first professional baseball team in Memphis was the Memphis Reds of the League Alliance in 1877. A different Reds team was created as a charter member of the original Southern League in 1885. The city's Southern League team was known as the Grays in 1886 and 1888, the Browns in 1887, simply Memphis in 1889, the Giants in 1892 and 1894, the Fever Germs in 1893, and the Lambs/Giants in 1895.

The city's longest-operating baseball team, first known as Memphis Egyptians, was formed in 1901 as a charter member of the Southern Association. From 1909 to 1911, this club was called the Turtles before receiving its best-known moniker, the Chickasaws, often shortened to Chicks, in 1912. The original Chicks remained in the league through 1960, winning eight pennants, one playoff championship, and one Dixie Series title. Russwood Park, their home ballpark, was destroyed by fire in April 1960. With the cost of building a new facility too high, the team dropped out of the league after the 1960 season.

After a seven-year span with no professional team, Memphis became host to the Memphis Blues, a Double-A team of the Texas League, in 1968. After six seasons, the Blues moved up to the Triple-A International League in 1974, but the franchise was revoked by the league due to financial problems after the 1976 season. Memphis gained an expansion team in the Double-A Southern League that played from 1978 to 1997. The Chicks were relocated to nearby Jackson as the West Tenn Diamond Jaxx in 1998 to make way for a new Triple-A team.

=== Pacific Coast League (1998–2020) ===
The Memphis Redbirds were created as an expansion franchise of the Triple-A Pacific Coast League in 1998. Initially, the team was owned as a non-profit community entity called the Memphis Redbirds Baseball Foundation, which operated the Redbirds until 2009 when management was turned over to Global Spectrum, a Comcast-owned company. While a new ballpark, AutoZone Park, was being constructed for the team, they played their first two seasons (1998–99) at the city's Tim McCarver Stadium.

The Redbirds became the top minor league affiliate of the Major League Baseball's St. Louis Cardinals. Memphis' team name, logo, color scheme, and uniforms were all based on those of the St. Louis team. In their inaugural season, the club was managed by Gaylen Pitts. The Redbirds played their first game on the road at Johnny Rosenblatt Stadium in Omaha, Nebraska. In game one of the doubleheader, the Omaha Royals defeated the Redbirds, 3–2. The team finished their first season of play with a 74–70 record, three games out of first place, leaving them second out of four teams in their division. They finished the 1999 season in third place with a 74–64 record.

In 2000, Memphis moved into the newly constructed AutoZone Park. In the park's first regular season game, held on April 14, the Redbirds defeated the Iowa Cubs, 14–3. Memphis went on to clinch the Pacific Coast League's American Conference East Division championship by ending the season in first place, 13 1/2 games ahead of the second-place Oklahoma RedHawks. In the American Conference series, the Redbirds defeated the Albuquerque Isotopes, three games to two, and advanced to the league finals. Memphis then defeated the Salt Lake Buzz, 3–1, to win the PCL championship. The Redbirds went on to face the Indianapolis Indians, league champions of the Triple-A International League, in the best-of-five Triple-A World Series. Memphis lost, three games to one.

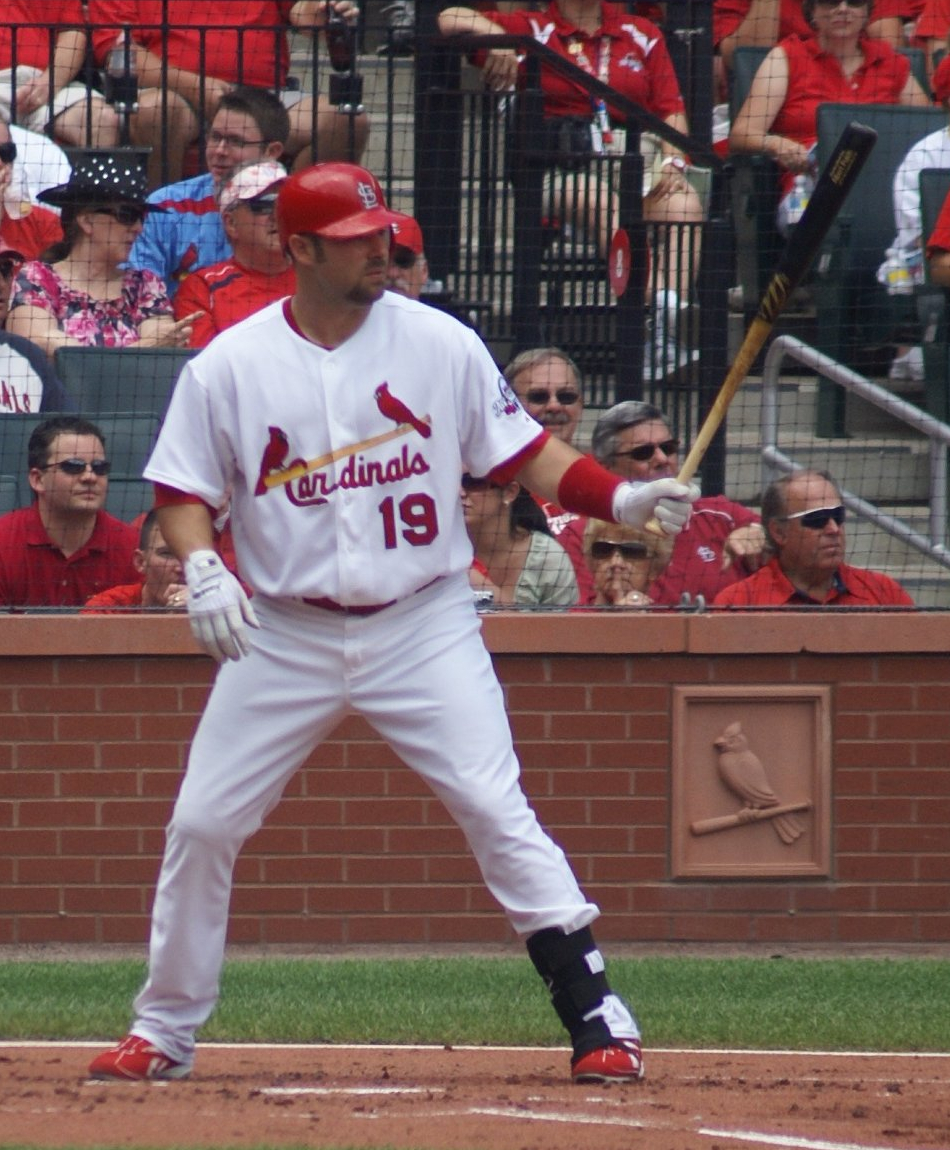
Nick Stavinoha, with the Redbirds from 2007 to 2011, is the team's all-time leader in games played (479), RBI (316), doubles (96), hits (531), and home runs (74).

The team finished each of the next three seasons in fourth place—2001 (62–81), 2002 (71–71), and 2003 (64–79). The 2002 campaign was a particularly tight race within the American Conference East Division, as the fourth-place Redbirds were a mere three games behind first-place Oklahoma. Tom Spencer became manager of the Redbirds in 2013 but was replaced midseason by Danny Sheaffer. Memphis hosted the Triple-A All-Star Game at AutoZone Park in 2003. Players Jason Bowers, Matt Duff, and Jason Ryan represented Memphis, as they were elected to the PCL All-Star Team.

Pitcher Dan Haren was selected for the 2004 PCL All-Star Team and was chosen as the PCL Star of the Game—the most valuable player representing the league. Memphis ended the 2004 season in second place, eight games behind first-place Oklahoma, with a 73–71 record. The team finished third (71–72) in 2005, 3 1/2 games behind the eventual league champion Nashville Sounds. From 2006 to 2007, Memphis finished further out of first place with records of 58–86 in 2006 and 56–88 in 2007.

The 2008 season began a reversal of the team's fortunes. Though winding up in second place in 2008, the team, under second-year manager Chris Maloney, managed a second-place finish with their 75–67 record. In 2009, the Redbirds' first-place finish (77–67) earned them the American Conference North Division title and a return to the postseason for the first time in nine seasons. In the American Conference series, Memphis faced the Albuquerque Isotopes, sweeping them in three-straight games. They continued to also defeat the Sacramento River Cats, 3–0, in the finals to win their second PCL championship. They then competed against the International League's Durham Bulls in the Bricktown Showdown for the Triple-A National Championship, but were defeated in the single game, 5–4.

Having finished the 2010 season in a tie for first place with the Iowa Cubs (82–62), Memphis was awarded the American Conference North title by virtue of having won the regular season series against Iowa. Memphis started the postseason by defeating the Oklahoma City RedHawks, 3–0, to win the American Conference championship. The Tacoma Rainiers then swept the Redbirds, defeating them for the PCL crown in three-straight games.

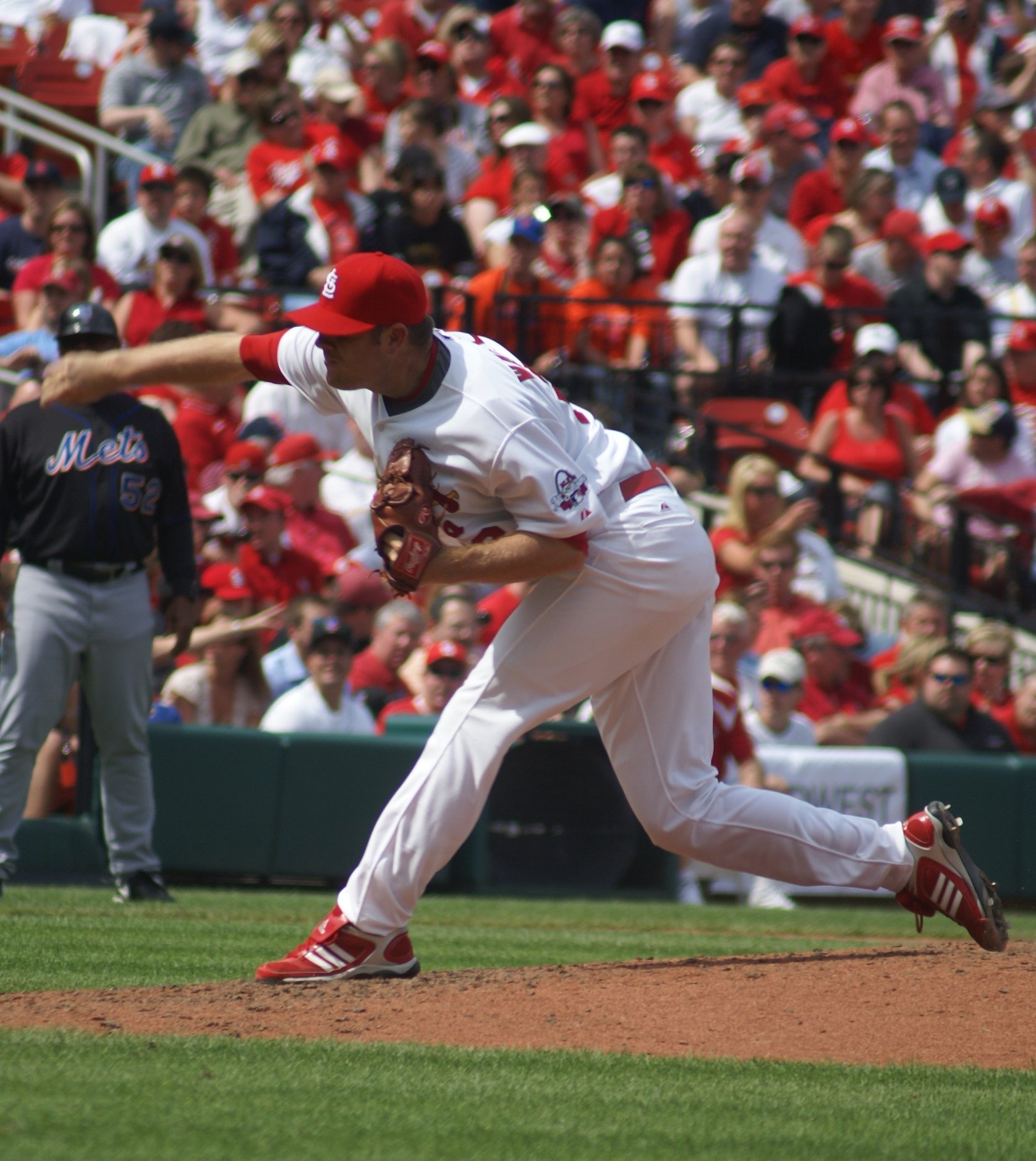
P. J. Walters, a Redbird from 2008 to 2011, is the team's all-time leader in wins (32), strikeouts (428), and games started (78).

The 2011, the club narrowly missed the postseason, finishing second with a 77–66 record. In 2012, manager Chris Maloney, the longest-tenured skipper in team history, was hired as St. Louis' first base coach. He was replaced by Ron Warner. He led the Redbirds to finish in third place (57–87) and 27 games out of first. The team fared better in 2013, ending up in second place (69–75), just one game behind the eventual league champion Omaha Storm Chasers.

In March 2014, the Redbirds were purchased by their major league parent club, the St. Louis Cardinals. The transaction also included the City of Memphis acquiring AutoZone Park and then leasing it to the team. Ron Warner led his club to a first-place finish (79–64), clinching the American Conference South. They were defeated in the conference series, three games to one, by Omaha, who later won the PCL title. The 2015 club, under manager Mike Shildt, finished in second place (73–71), two games behind the Round Rock Express.

The Cardinals sold their majority interest in the team to Peter B. Freund of Trinity Baseball Holdings in March 2016. Memphis ended the 2016 season in fourth place with a 65–77 record. Prior to the 2017 season, the Redbirds unveiled new logos and uniforms. The primary logo is designed to look like a neon sign, such as those seen on nearby Beale Street, consisting of the team name and a redesigned image of team mascot, Rockey the Redbird. A secondary logo uses similar neon tubing to form an "M" in the shape of a music note to honor the city's blues and rock 'n' roll heritage. Led by PCL Manager of the Year Stubby Clapp, the 2017 Redbirds clinched the division title with a 91–50 record. They went on to defeat the Colorado Springs Sky Sox, 3–2, to win the American Conference championship. In the PCL finals, the Redbirds defeated the El Paso Chihuahuas, 3–2, to win their third PCL championship. Memphis lost the Triple-A National Championship Game, 5–3, against the International League's Durham Bulls, whom they also faced in 2009.

Stubby Clapp won the PCL Manager of the Year Award for a second time in 2018. Right-hander Dakota Hudson won the PCL Pitcher of the Year Award. The team once again finished with the league's best record, winning the 2018 American Southern Division title with an 83–57 record. They defeated the Oklahoma City Dodgers, three games to one, to win the American Conference championship. The Redbirds won their second PCL championship in as many years by beating the Fresno Grizzlies, 3–1. They went on to win the 2018 Triple-A National Championship against the Durham Bulls, 14–4. First baseman Alex Mejia was named the game's MVP.

Memphis finished the 2019 season in second place with a 69–71 record under manager Ben Johnson.

The start of the 2020 season was postponed due to the COVID-19 pandemic before ultimately being cancelled on June 30.

=== International League (2021–present) ===
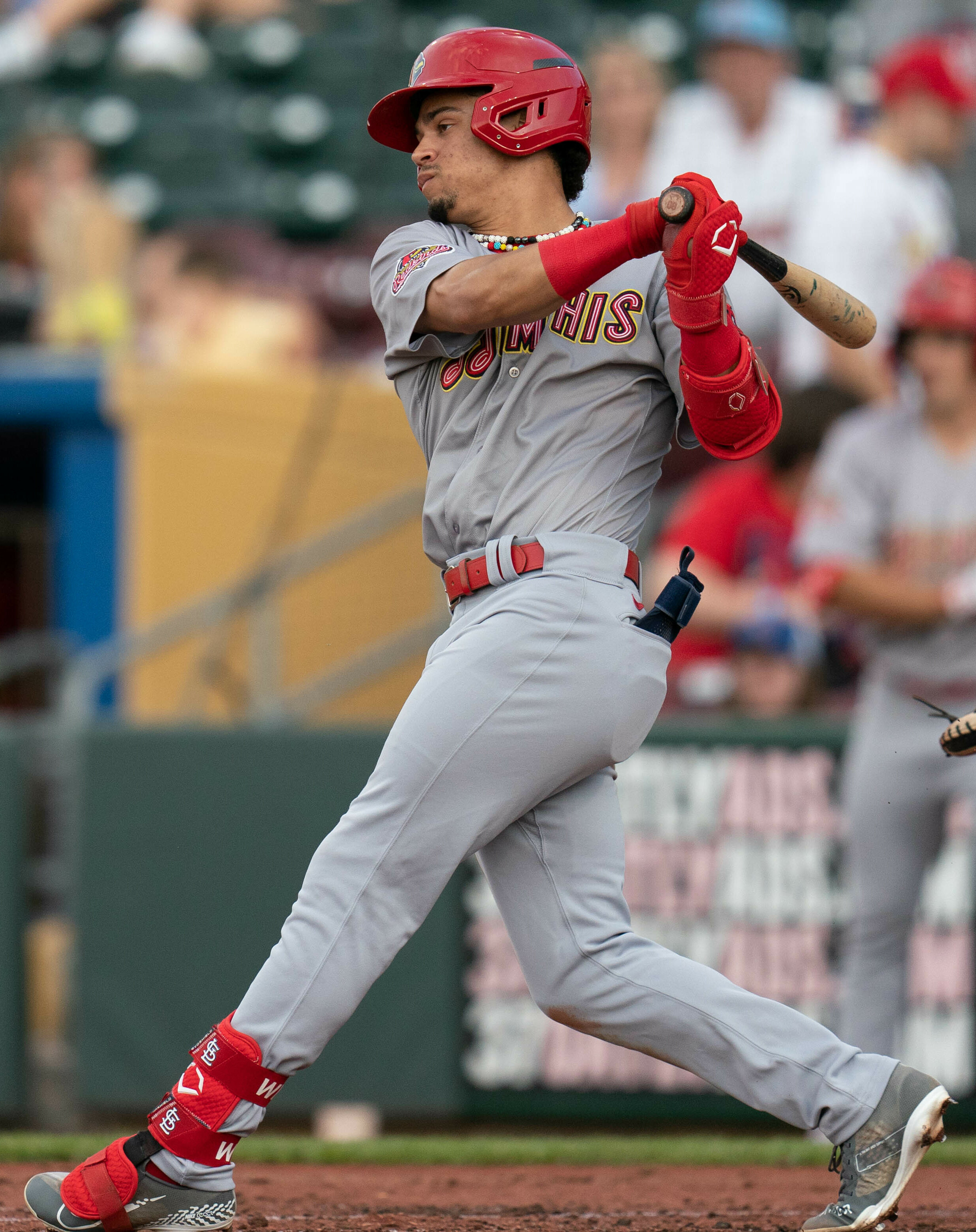
Masyn Winn won the 2023 International League Top MLB Prospect Award.

Following the 2020 season, Major League Baseball assumed control of Minor League Baseball in a move to increase player salaries, modernize facility standards, and reduce travel. As a result, the Pacific Coast League was disbanded, and the Redbirds were placed in the Triple-A East, where they continued to serve as the top farm club for the St. Louis Cardinals. Memphis began competition in the new league on May 4 with a 7–5 loss to the Durham Bulls at AutoZone Park. They lost the next four games before collecting their first Triple-A East win with a 7–6 victory in 10 innings over Durham on May 9. Memphis ended the season in fifth place in the Southeastern Division with a 57–63 record. No playoffs were held to determine a league champion; instead, the team with the best regular-season record was declared the winner. Memphis placed 12th in the league standings. However, 10 games that had been postponed from the start of the season were reinserted into the schedule as a postseason tournament called the Triple-A Final Stretch in which all 30 Triple-A clubs competed for the highest winning percentage. Memphis finished the tournament tied for 13th place with a 4–4 record. Overall, they went 61–67.

Prior to the 2022 season, the Redbirds were sold to Diamond Baseball Holdings, a group which operates other affiliated Minor League Baseball teams and is led by Pat Battle and former team owner Peter B. Freund. In 2022, the Triple-A East became known as the International League (IL), the name historically used by the regional circuit prior to the 2021 reorganization. Memphis began IL play with an Opening Night win against the Gwinnett Stripers, 2–1, at AutoZone Park on April 5. They ended the season in sixth place in the Western Division at 73–77. The league began using a split-season format in 2023 in which the teams with the best league-wide records at the end of each half have qualified for the playoffs. Memphis missed the first-half title by nine-and-a-half games, placing eighth at 39–36. They dropped further back in the second half, placing 17th at 32–42, fifteen-and-a-half games back. Overall, the team went 71–78. Luken Baker won the International League Most Valuable Player Award and Masyn Winn was chosen for the IL Top MLB Prospect Award. In 2024, Memphis tied for seventh place in the first-half with a 38–37 mark, 12 games out of first. They finished in 10th place in the second half at 36–37, eleven-and-a-half games back. Their full season record was an even 74–74. In 2025, Memphis placed sixth in the first half at 41–32 and tied for ninth in the second half at 39–36. Overall, they went 80–68. Shortstop JJ Wetherholt won the 2025 IL Top MLB Prospect Award.

Memphis won the 2026 first-half title on the last day of the half with a 10–8 victory at home over Nashville for a league-best 47–28 record, qualifying them for their first International League playoffs. The Redbirds placed 13th in the second half at 36–39, giving them an overall record of 83–67, the second-highest in the league. They were defeated by the second-half champion Rochester Red Wings, 2–1, in the best-of-three series for the IL championship.

== Season-by-season records ==
Memphis Redbirds records (last five seasons)
Season	Regular-season					Postseason			MLB affiliate	Ref.
Season	Record	Win %	League	Division	GB	Record	Win %	Result	MLB affiliate	Ref.
2022	73–77	.487	13th	6th	18 1/2	—	—	—	St. Louis Cardinals	
2023	71–78	.477	11th	5th	13 1/2	—	—	—	St. Louis Cardinals	
2024	74–74	.500	9th	5th	15	—	—	—	St. Louis Cardinals	
2025	80–68	.541	8th	4th	6 1/2	—	—	—	St. Louis Cardinals	
2026	83–67	.553	2nd	1st	—	1–2	.333	Won first-half title Lost IL championship vs. Rochester Red Wings, 2–1	St. Louis Cardinals	
Totals	381–364	.511	—	—	—	1–2	.333	—	—	—

== Rivals ==
Memphis' chief rivals have been those based in Nashville. Located approximately 200 miles (320 km) to the northeast and connected to Memphis by Interstate 40, Nashville has fielded several teams which have competed in the same leagues as Memphis' teams since the late 19th century. The Redbirds entered the rivalry when they joined the Pacific Coast League in 1998. The teams have been division rivals ever since. In 2009, Memphis clinched the American Conference North Division title, finishing the season just two games ahead of Nashville, which spent the majority of the season in first place. Similarly, Memphis finished the 2014 season two-and-a-half games ahead of Nashville despite trailing the Sounds for most of the season. In 2021, both teams were placed in the Southeast Division of the Triple-A East. This became the International League in 2022, and both clubs were realigned into its West Division. Memphis won the 2026 first-half title on the last day of the half with a win at home over Nashville. As of the completion of the 2026 head-to-head series, the Sounds lead the 29-year rivalry against the Redbirds with a record of 250–214 in 464 meetings.

From 2012 to 2015, the two teams competed in the I-40 Cup Series, a season-long, 16-game promotional series between the clubs. Whichever of the two won the most games played between them was declared the winner and got to keep the trophy cup until the next season. The losing team donated game tickets to a charity selected by the winner. The Sounds won the inaugural 2012 contest (9–7), and Memphis won the 2013 series (7–9). The teams tied the 2014 and 2015 series (both 8–8), but the Redbirds retained the title in both instances. The teams discontinued the promotion after the 2015 season.

== Ballparks ==
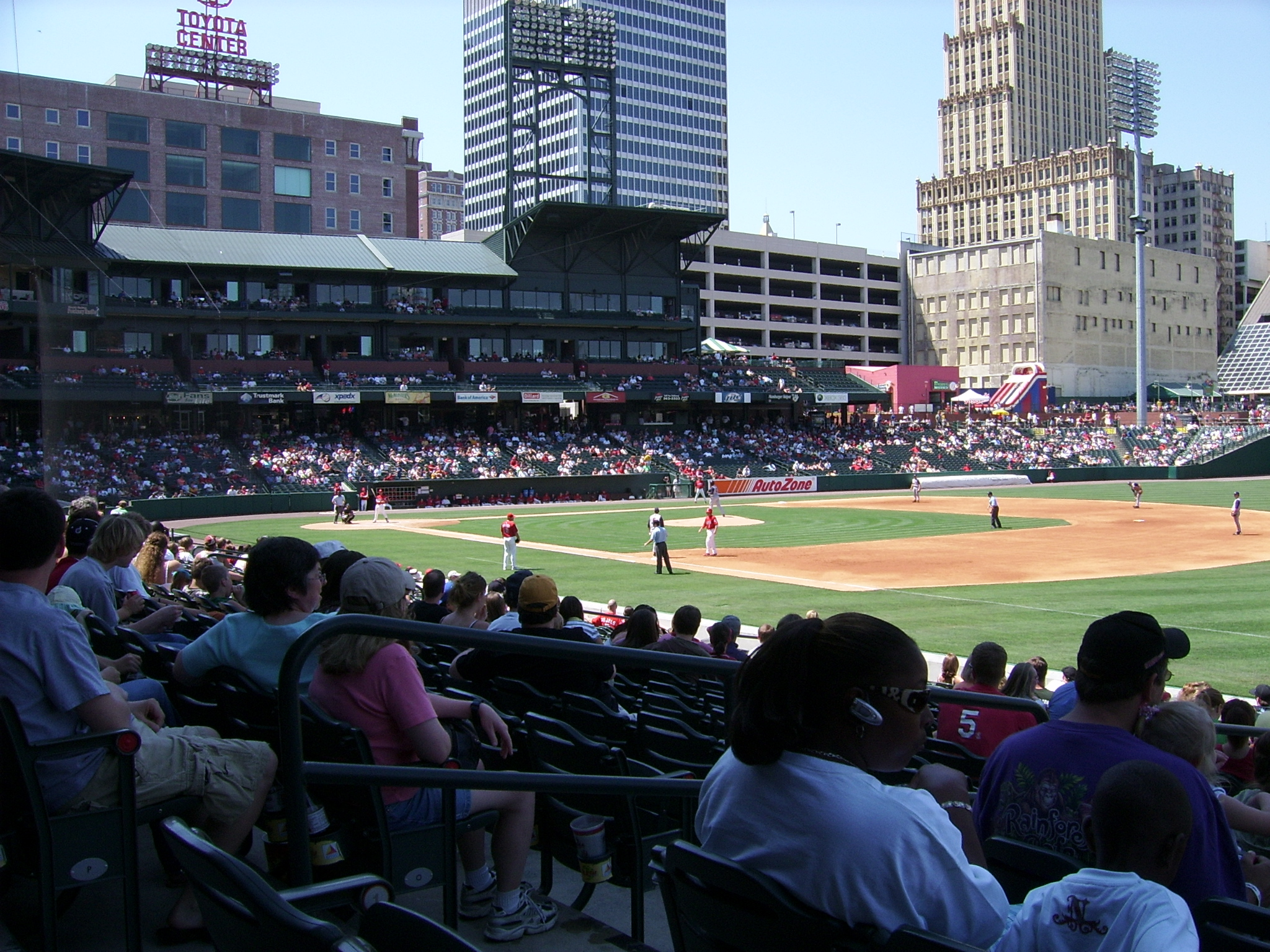
Memphis' AutoZone Park

=== Tim McCarver Stadium (1998–1999) ===
The Redbirds played their first two seasons at Tim McCarver Stadium while a new, permanent stadium was being constructed downtown. The stadium was built in 1963 for use as an American Legion field. When the Texas League's Memphis Blues came to town in 1968, it became their home ballpark. It was later used by the Memphis Chicks until 1997. The stadium, with an 8,800 person capacity, was demolished in 2005.

=== AutoZone Park (2000–present) ===
The Redbirds' current home ballpark is AutoZone Park, which opened on April 1, 2000, originally seated 16,000 and was later downsized in 2015 to the current seating capacity of 10,000 people. The reduced seating due to $6 million in renovations allowed for picnic tables, seating in grassy areas, and the elimination of the popular left field bluff seating. It was constructed in downtown Memphis at a cost of $80.5 million. It was built to Major League Baseball standards, but with the absence of outfield seats or food vendors far down the foul lines. The first game played at the park was an exhibition between Memphis and St. Louis. A standing-room-only crowd witnessed the big league club defeat their Triple-A affiliate, 10–6.

== Uniforms ==
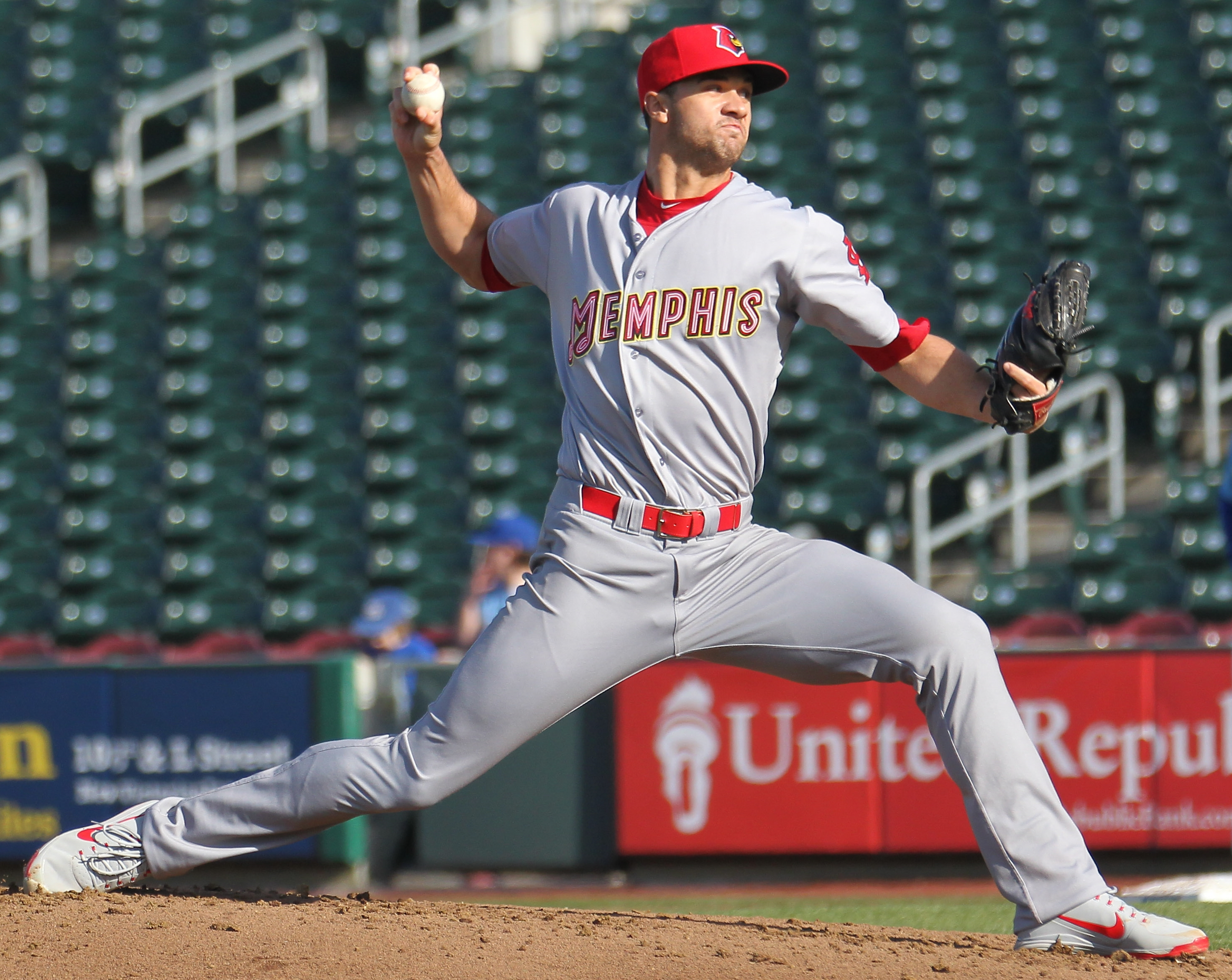
Jack Flaherty pitching in the Redbirds' road uniform (2018)

The Redbirds' current home jerseys are white with the word "Memphis" written across the chest in red and white characters surrounded by navy blue and neon yellow which resemble a neon sign. The team's primary logo is sewn on the right sleeve, and the St. Louis Cardinals' overlapping "STL" logo is located on the left sleeve. The home cap is solid red with the face of team mascot, Rockey the Redbird, on the front. Road jerseys, though made of gray material, are identical.

An alternate jersey is a power blue pullover v-neck reminiscent of those worn by St. Louis in the 1980s. Striped bands of red, white, and blue adorn the neck and sleeve openings. The front features an image of Rockey the Redbird looking over his shoulder, ball in hand, as if waiting to pitch the ball, on the left chest (this is an homage to a classic St. Louis Cardinals logo, used in the 1950s, sometimes known as the "Dirty Bird"). The primary Memphis logo is displayed on the left sleeve, and the STL lettering is displayed on the right. An alternate cap is navy blue with a red bill and the music note styled "M" on the front.

Memphis' uniforms from 1998 to 2016 were quite similar to those of the St. Louis Cardinals. Home uniforms consisted of white jerseys with the team's primary logo sewn across the chest: the word "Memphis" in red letters surrounded by navy blue set against a yellow baseball bat on which two red cardinals were perched. The player's number was displayed on the front left below the Memphis wordmark in red block characters bordered by navy blue. The upper left sleeve had a circular navy blue patch with the St. Louis Cardinals' overlapping "STL" logo on the center in red letters bordered by white. The player's last name was sewn on the back in red block characters surrounded by navy blue, and his number was displayed below his name in the same font and colors. White pants were worn with red belts and predominately red shoes. Some players wore higher pants paired with red socks with white and navy blue stripes. The home cap was solid red with a white "M" bordered by navy blue on the center. Road uniforms were identical to those worn for home games with only a few exceptions: jerseys and pants were made from gray material, the St. Louis patch was absent from the sleeve, and the cap was navy blue with a red button and a red "M" with white border.

== Television and radio ==
All Memphis Redbirds games are televised live on MiLB.TV. Jack Keffer is the team's lead broadcaster. Steve Selby was the voice of the Redbirds from 2000 until before the 2021 season, when he retired. Evan Stockton followed Selby as the lead broadcaster in 2021. Past broadcast commentators have included Tom Stocker, David Kelly, Charlie Lea, and Reggie Williams. Since 2018, a select number of games are also broadcast on KTRS 550 AM in St. Louis, allowing Cardinals fans to keep tabs on up-and-coming players as well as promoting the Redbirds and Memphis tourism to the St. Louis market.

== Mascot ==
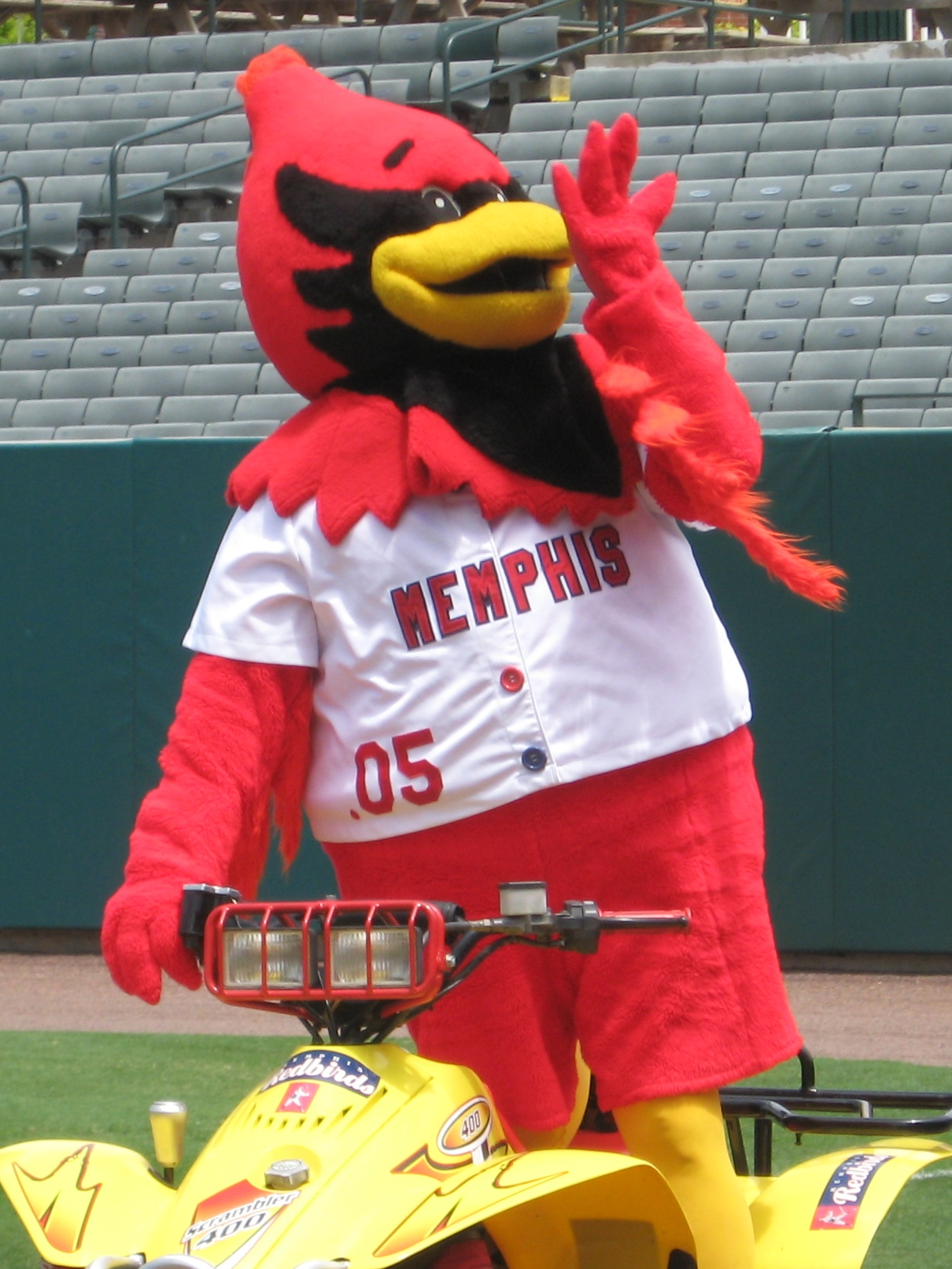
Rockey the Redbird, the team mascot

The Memphis Redbirds' mascot is an anthropomorphic cardinal named Rockey the Redbird. He is bright red with black eyebrows and feathers around the face and a yellow beak and legs. He wears the same style jerseys as the team bearing the number 901, which is Memphis' telephone area code. He made his debut in the Redbirds' inaugural 1998 season.

== Roster ==
Memphis Redbirds roster
Players		Coaches/Other
Pitchers: 50 Jurrangelo Cijntje; 38 Josh Fleming; 35 Skylar Hales; 73 Pete Hansen; 51 Austin Love; 44 Mason Molina; 28 Ryan Murphy; 68 Bobby Olsen; 43 Sandro Santana; 30 Andrew Schultz; 8 Brandt Thompson	Catchers: 7 Graysen Tarlow; 29 Andy Yerzy; Infielders: 16 Dakota Harris; 75 Noah Mendlinger; 11 Ramon Mendoza; 19 Brody Moore; 27 Trey Paige; Outfielders: 5 Chase Davis; 12 Colton Ledbetter; 15 Zach Levenson; 26 Bligh Madris	Manager: 34 Ben Johnson; Coaches: 56 Howie Clark (hitting); -- Ollie Kadey (pitching); 36 Darwin Marrero (pitching); 32 Peter Mooney (bench); 60-day injured list: -- Alex Cornwell (full season); 21 Ixan Henderson; 79 Sem Robberse; 57 Zack Thompson; 7-day injured list; * On St. Louis Cardinals 40-man roster; ~ Development list; # Rehab assignment; ∞ Reserve list; ‡ Restricted list; § Suspended list; † Temporarily inactive list; Roster updated September 29, 2026; Transactions; → More rosters: MiLB • International League; → St. Louis Cardinals minor league players

== Achievements ==
=== Awards ===
Seven individuals have won league awards in recognition of their performance while with the Redbirds. Stubby Clapp won the PCL Manager of the Year Award in 2017 and 2018. Luken Baker won the IL Most Valuable Player Award in 2023. Dakota Hudson was selected for the PCL Pitcher of the Year Award in 2018. Two players have won the IL Top MLB Prospect Award: Masyn Winn (2023) and JJ Wetherholt (2025). Additionally, two members of the front office staff have won the PCL Executive of the Year Award: Allie Prescott (2000) and Ben Weiss (2012).

Thirty-seven players have been selected for the midseason Triple-A All-Star Game. Of those players, only Brandon Dickson (2010 and 2012) and Ryan Sherriff (2016 and 2017) have been selected twice while playing for Memphis. Two players have been chosen as the All-Star Game's MVP: Dan Haren (2004) and Michael Wacha (2013).

=== Retired numbers ===
The Memphis Redbirds have not honored any of their players by retiring their uniform numbers. However, the St. Louis Cardinals' retired numbers are also retired throughout the Cardinals' minor league organization. When a number is retired, only the player with the retired number can wear that number if he returns to that team as a player or coach. This ensures that the number will be associated with one player of particular importance to the team. The following numbers are, therefore, also retired by Memphis:

Ozzie
Smith
SS
Retired 1996
Red
Schoendienst
2B, Mgr, Coach
Retired 1996
Stan
Musial
OF, 1B, GM
Retired 1963
Enos
Slaughter
RF
Retired 1996
Tony
La Russa
Mgr
Retired 2012
Ken
Boyer
3B, Mgr, Coach
Retired 1984
Dizzy
Dean
SP
Retired 1974
Lou
Brock
LF, Coach
Retired 1979
Ted
Simmons
C
Retired 2021
Whitey
Herzog
Mgr, GM
Retired 2010
Bruce
Sutter
RP
Retired 2006
Jackie
Robinson
2B
Retired by MLB 1997
Bob
Gibson
SP, Coach
Retired 1975
Gussie
Busch
Owner
Retired 1984

== Managers ==
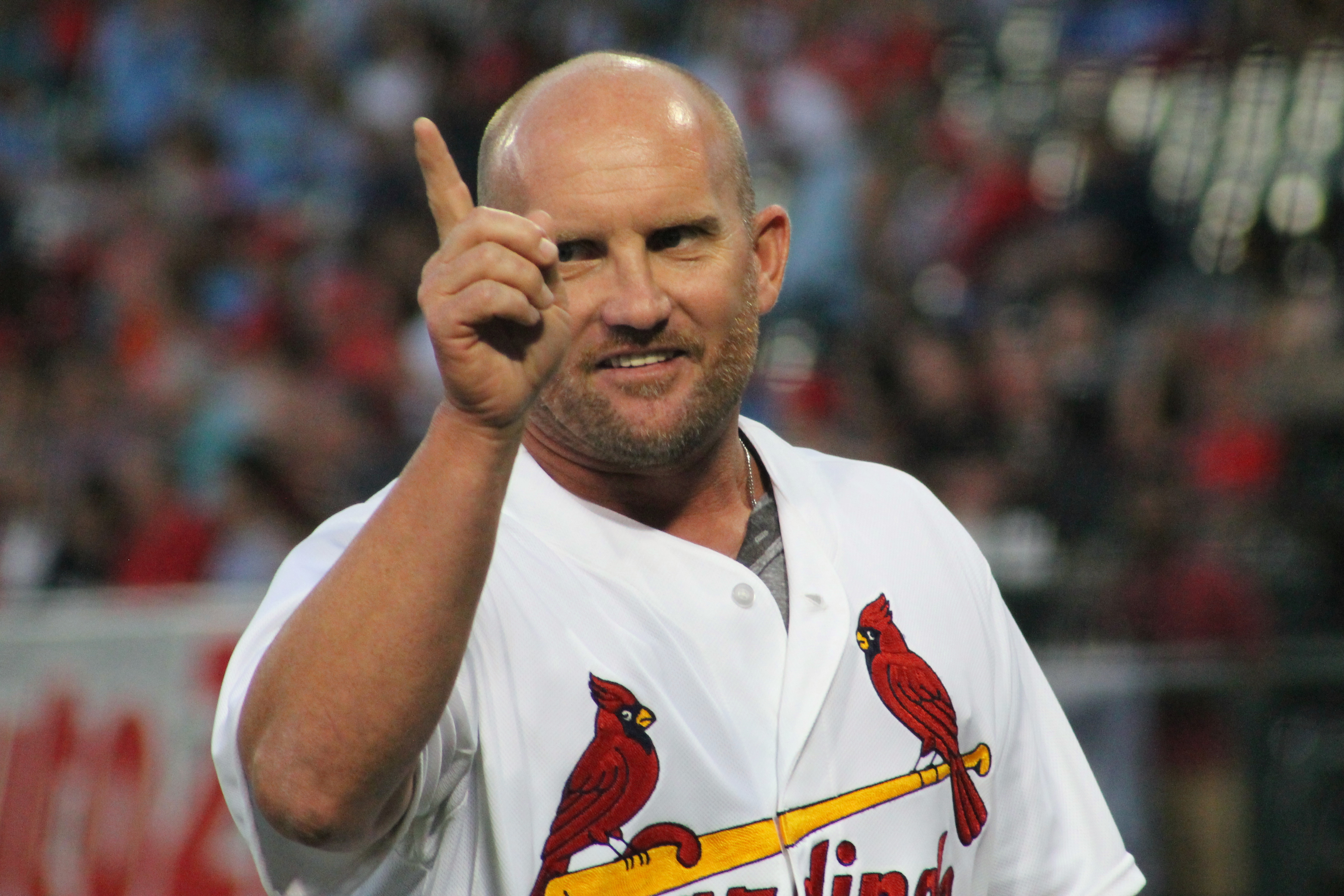
Stubby Clapp, Redbirds manager from 2017 to 2018

Over the course of 29 seasons, the Memphis Redbirds have employed 8 managers. The duties of the team manager include team strategy and leadership on and off the field. Three managers have guided the team to win the Pacific Coast League championship: Gaylen Pitts (2000), Chris Maloney (2009), and Stubby Clapp (2017 and 2018). Clapp also led Memphis to the Triple-A championship in 2018. Ben Johnson, who has led the team since 2019, is the longest-tenured manager in team history, having managed them for 1,012 games from 2019 to 2026.

Memphis Redbirds managerial record
No.	Manager	Season(s)	Regular season				Postseason				Ref.
No.	Manager	Season(s)	Games	Wins	Losses	Win %	Apps.	Wins	Losses	Win %	Ref.
1	Gaylen Pitts	1998–2002	711	364	347	.512	1	7	6	.538	
2	Tom Spencer	2003	64	22	42	.344	—	—	—	—	
3	Danny Sheaffer	2003–2006	510	244	266	.478	—	—	—	—	
4	Chris Maloney	2007–2011	717	367	350	.512	2	9	4	.692	
5	Ron Warner	2012–2014	431	205	226	.476	1	1	3	.250	
6	Mike Shildt	2015–2016	286	138	148	.483	—	—	—	—	
7	Stubby Clapp	2017–2018	281	174	107	.619	2	13	7	.650	
8	Ben Johnson	2019–present	1,012	510	502	.504	1	1	2	.333	
Totals		1998–2026	4,013	2,025	1,988	.505	1	31	22	.585	—
