= 2022 St. Louis Cardinals season =

Major League Baseball season

2022 St. Louis Cardinals
- National League Central champions
- League: National League
- Division: Central
- Ballpark: Busch Stadium
- City: St. Louis, Missouri
- Record: 93–69 (.574)
- Divisional place: 1st
- Owners: William DeWitt Jr.
- President: Bill DeWitt III
- General managers: Mike Girsch
- Managers: Oliver Marmol
- Television: Bally Sports Midwest (Dan McLaughlin, Jim Edmonds, Brad Thompson)
- Radio: KMOX NewsRadio 1120; St. Louis Cardinals Radio Network (John Rooney, Rick Horton, Mike Claiborne)
- Stats: ESPN.com; Baseball Reference

The 2022 St. Louis Cardinals season was the 141st for the St. Louis Cardinals, a Major League Baseball franchise in St. Louis, Missouri. It was the 131st season for the Cardinals in the National League and their 17th at Busch Stadium III. They were managed by first-year manager Oliver Marmol. The season saw the return of Albert Pujols, a former Cardinals star player. Pujols and longtime catcher Yadier Molina announced that the 2022 season would be their last.

On December 2, 2021, Commissioner of Baseball Rob Manfred announced a lockout of players, following expiration of the collective bargaining agreement (CBA) between the league and the Major League Baseball Players Association (MLBPA). On March 10, 2022, MLB and the MLBPA agreed to a new collective bargaining agreement, thus ending the lockout. Opening Day was played on April 7. Although MLB previously announced that several series would be cancelled due to the lockout, the agreement provides for a 162-game season, with originally canceled games to be made up via doubleheaders.

The Cardinals won the National League Central title but they were upset in the National League Wild Card Series by the Philadelphia Phillies, losing in a two-game sweep.

== Offseason ==
=== Coaching changes ===
On October 14, 2021, the Cardinals fired manager Mike Shildt. On October 25, the team named Oliver Marmol the new manager.

=== Lockout ===
The expiration of the league's collective bargaining agreement (CBA) with the Major League Baseball Players Association occurred on December 1, 2021, with no new agreement in place. As a result, the team owners voted unanimously to lock out the players, stopping all free agency and trades.

The parties came to an agreement on a new CBA on March 10, 2022.

=== Rule changes ===
Under the new CBA, several new rules were instituted for the 2022 season. The National League will adopt the designated hitter full-time, a draft lottery will be implemented, the postseason will expand from ten teams to twelve, and advertising patches will appear on player uniforms and helmets for the first time.

== Regular season ==
=== Summary ===
==== April ====
On April 27, Nolan Arenado was ejected for inciting a bench-clearing brawl against the New York Mets after yelling at Yoan López for throwing near his head, assuming the throw was retaliation for the Cardinals having hit three Mets batters the night before. Arenado received a two-game suspension for the incident, but the suspension was reduced to one game after an appeal. He was named National League Player of the Month after having batted .375 with five home runs, 17 RBI, 12 extra-base hits and a league-leading 1.125 OPS. The last Cardinals third baseman to win the award was Ken Reitz in May 1977.

==== May ====
On May 23, Goldschmidt hit a walk-off grand slam in the bottom of the tenth inning versus the Toronto Blue Jays for a 7–3 win. That grand slam extended Goldschmidt's hitting streak to 15 games, during which he had batted .438 with 28 hits, 12 doubles, five home runs, and 22 RBI. Since RBI became an official statistic in 1920, no major leaguer had previously achieved all of those totals during any 15-game span.

For the month of May, Goldschmidt led the major leagues with a 1.288 OPS and 33 RBI, alongside leading the National League with a .404 average. His ten home runs ranked second in the NL. Thus, he was named the NL Player of the Month. It was the third consecutive month a Cardinal had been named a NL Player of the Month, following O'Neill (September 2021) and Arenado (April 2022).

==== June ====
Goldschmidt continued his hit streak for 25 games until June 4 versus the Chicago Cubs, when he was 0-for-2 with two bases on balls. During the streak, he hit .424 (42-for-99)/.482/.869, 24 extra base hits and 36 RBI. It was the longest hitting streak by a Cardinal since Pujols hit in 30 straight in 2003, and tied for third-longest for the Cardinals since 1963. Albert Pujols became the 10th player in major league history to achieve 3,000 games played on June 4, appearing in the second inning as an injury replacement for Corey Dickerson.

On June 11, 2022, Tommy Edman hit a two-run home run in the bottom of the ninth inning versus the Cincinnati Reds for his first career walk-off home run and RBI, to secure a 5–4 victory. For much of the game, the Reds led, 3–1, but the Cardinals scored four runs in the eighth and ninth innings to rally to win.

==== July ====
The Cardinals hit four consecutive home runs on July 2, 2022, the 11th such occurrence in major league history. At Citizens Bank Park in Philadelphia, Nolan Arenado, Nolan Gorman, Juan Yepez and Dylan Carlson all homered off Phillies starter Kyle Gibson with two outs in the first inning. It was the first time that the Cardinals had accomplished the feat, and the first time that it occurred in the first inning. The last club to do so were the Chicago White Sox on August 16, 2020. Arenado later won the game for St. Louis in the ninth inning with his second home run of the game, 7–6, which was also the 5,000th at bat of his career.

==== August ====
In August, the Cardinals went 22-7, their best month of the season. They notched their season's first series sweep, of the New York Yankees. They overtook the Milwaukee Brewers in the race for the National League Central division; at one point, their lead stood at 8.5 games.

==== September ====
In a September 8 game against the Washington Nationals, Adam Wainwright and Yadier Molina made their 324th start as a battery, tying the Major League record. On September 14, Wainwright and Molina made their record-breaking 325th start, in a game against the Milwaukee Brewers that the Cardinals won 4-1. On September 23, 2022, Albert Pujols hit his 699th and 700th home runs, in a game in which the Cardinals shut out the Los Angeles Dodgers, 11-0.

=== Game log ===
2022 St. Louis Cardinals Game Log: 93–69 (Home: 53–29; Away: 40–40)
April: 11–9 (Home: 5–5; Away: 6–4)

#	Date	Opponent	Score	Win	Loss	Save	Attendance	Record	Box / Streak
1	April 7	Pirates	9–0	**Wainwright** (1–0)	Brubaker (0–1)	—	46,256	1–0	W1
2	April 9	Pirates	6–2	**Whitley** (1–0)	Keller (0–1)	—	45,025	2–0	W2
3	April 10	Pirates	4–9	Yajure (1–0)	**Matz** (0–1)	—	40,027	2–1	L1
4	April 12	Royals	6–5	**Hicks** (1–0)	Lynch (0–1)	**Gallegos** (1)	40,398	3–1	W1
5	April 14	@ Brewers	1–5	Woodruff (1–1)	**Wainwright** (1–1)	—	42,794	3–2	L1
6	April 15	@ Brewers	10–1	**Mikolas** (1–0)	Peralta (0–1)	—	26,874	4–2	W1
7	April 16	@ Brewers	2–1	**Matz** (1–1)	Houser (0–2)	**Gallegos** (2)	26,356	5–2	W2
8	April 17	@ Brewers	5–6	Cousins (1–0)	**Hudson** (0–1)	Hader (4)	23,001	5–3	L1
9	April 19	@ Marlins	5–1	**Wainwright** (2–1)	Luzardo (0–1)	—	8,475	6–3	W1
10	April 20	@ Marlins	2–0	**Cabrera** (1–0)	Bender (0–2)	**Gallegos** (3)	8,655	7–3	W2
11	April 21	@ Marlins	0–5	López (2–0)	**Hicks** (1–1)	—	9,670	7–4	L1
12	April 22	@ Reds	4–2	**Matz** (2–1)	Greene (1–2)	**Gallegos** (4)	20,470	8–4	W1
13	April 23	@ Reds	5–0	**Hudson** (1–1)	Mahle (1–2)	—	28,598	9–4	W2
14	April 24	@ Reds	1–4	Lodolo (1–2)	**Wainwright** (2–2)	Sims (1)	23,124	9–5	L1
15	April 25	Mets	2–5	May (1–0)	**Gallegos** (0–1)	Diaz (2)	35,455	9–6	L2
16	April 26	Mets	0–3	Bassitt (3–1)	**Hicks** (1–2)	Diaz (3)	32,215	9–7	L3
17	April 27	Mets	10–5	**Woodford** (1–0)	Carrasco (1–1)	—	34,822	10–7	W1
18	April 28	Diamondbacks	8–3	**Hudson** (2–1)	Castellanos (1–1)	—	33,464	11–7	W2
19	April 29	Diamondbacks	2–6	Bumgarner (1–1)	**Wainwright** (2–3)	—	40,753	11–8	L1
20	April 30	Diamondbacks	0–2	Kelly (2–1)	**Mikolas** (1–1)	Kennedy (1)	40,144	11–9	L2

May: 17–12 (Home: 10–6; Away: 7–6)

#	Date	Opponent	Score	Win	Loss	Save	Attendance	Record	Box / Streak
21	May 1	Diamondbacks	7–5	**Whitley** (2–0)	Middleton (0–1)	**Helsley** (1)	45,123	12–9	W1
22	May 2	Royals	1–0	**Matz** (3–1)	Greinke (0–2)	**Gallegos** (5)	33,963	13–9	W2
23	May 3	@ Royals	1–7	Keller (1–2)	**Hudson** (2–2)	—	18,788	13–10	L1
24	May 4	@ Royals	10–0	**Wainwright** (3–3)	Bubic (0–3)	—	12,774	14–10	W1
25	May 5	@ Giants	7–1	**Mikolas** (2–1)	Littell (0–1)	—	22,562	15–10	W2
26	May 6	@ Giants	3–2	**Helsley** (1–0)	Doval (0–1)	**Gallegos** (6)	28,898	16–10	W3
27	May 7	@ Giants	7–13	Webb (4–1)	**Matz** (3–2)	—	40,113	16–11	L1
28	May 8	@ Giants	3–4	Leone (2–0)	**Cabrera** (1–1)	Doval (5)	38,193	16–12	L2
29	May 10	Orioles	3–5	Bradish (1–1)	**Naughton** (0–1)	Bautista (1)	33,649	16–13	L3
30	May 11	Orioles	10–1	**Mikolas** (3–1)	Watkins (0–1)	—	34,533	17–13	W1
31	May 12	Orioles	2–3	Akin (1–0)	**Matz** (3–3)	Bautista (2)	35,198	17–14	L1
32	May 13	Giants	2–8	Webb (5–1)	**Hicks** (1–3)	—	39,612	17–15	L2
33	May 14	Giants	4–0	**Hudson** (3–2)	Junis (1–1)	—	44,537	18–15	W1
34	May 15	Giants	15–6	**Wainwright** (4–3)	Rodón (4–2)	—	39,703	19–15	W2
35	May 17 (1)	@ Mets	1–3	Reed (1–0)	**Mikolas** (3–2)	Díaz (9)	(See Game 2)	19–16	L1
36	May 17 (2)	@ Mets	4–3	**Helsley** (2–0)	Rodríguez (0–2)	**Gallegos** (7)	27,457	20–16	W1
37	May 18	@ Mets	4–11	Scherzer (5–1)	**Walsh** (0–1)	—	32,798	20–17	L1
38	May 19	@ Mets	6–7 (10)	Holderman (1–0)	**Gallegos** (0–2)	—	28,801	20–18	L2
39	May 20	@ Pirates	5–3	**Wainwright** (5–3)	Thompson (2–4)	**Gallegos** (8)	14,034	21–18	W1
40	May 21	@ Pirates	5–4	**VerHagen** (1–0)	Quintana (1–2)	**Helsley** (2)	24,644	22–18	W2
41	May 22	@ Pirates	18–4	**Rondón** (1–0)	Wilson (0–3)	—	13,510	23–18	W3
42	May 23	Blue Jays	7–3 (10)	**Cabrera** (2–1)	Phelps (0–1)	—	36,033	24–18	W4
43	May 24	Blue Jays	1–8	Gausman (4–3)	**Hicks** (1–4)	—	33,797	24–19	L1
44	May 26	Brewers	3–4	Lauer (5–1)	**Wainwright** (5–4)	Hader (16)	35,107	24–20	L2
45	May 27	Brewers	4–2	**VerHagen** (2–0)	Woodruff (5–3)	**Helsley** (3)	39,077	25–20	W1
46	May 28	Brewers	8–3	**Liberatore** (1–0)	Houser (3–5)	—	45,594	26–20	W2
47	May 29	Brewers	0–8	Burnes (3–2)	**Mikolas** (3–3)	—	44,169	26–21	L1
48	May 30	Padres	6–3	**Pallante** (1–0)	Martinez (2–3)	—	42,140	27–21	W1
49	May 31	Padres	3–2 (10)	**VerHagen** (2–0)	Rogers (0–2)	—	33,418	28–21	W2

June: 15–14 (Home: 9–5; Away: 6–9)

#	Date	Opponent	Score	Win	Loss	Save	Attendance	Record	Box / Streak
50	June 1	Padres	5–2	**Hudson** (4–2)	Darvish (4–3)	**Wittgren** (1)	34,268	29–21	W3
51	June 2	@ Cubs	5–7	Thompson (6–0)	**Liberatore** (1–1)	—	30,466	29–22	L1
52	June 3	@ Cubs	14–5	**Mikolas** (4–3)	Stroman (2–5)	**Thompson** (1)	32,482	30–22	W1
53	June 4 (1)	@ Cubs	1–6	Swarmer (1–0)	**Oviedo** (0–1)	—	32,792	30–23	L1
54	June 4 (2)	@ Cubs	7–4 (10)	**Gallegos** (1–2)	Rucker (0–1)	—	31,673	31–23	W1
55	June 5	@ Cubs	5–3 (11)	**Cabrera** (3–1)	Norris (0–4)	—	31,424	32–23	W2
56	June 7	@ Rays	2–4 (10)	Poche (2–0)	**VerHagen** (3–1)	—	10,905	32–24	L1
57	June 8	@ Rays	3–11	Kluber (3–2)	**Naughton** (0–2)	—	12,906	32–25	L2
58	June 9	@ Rays	1–2	McClanahan (7–2)	**Mikolas** (4–4)	Adam (2)	14,892	32–26	L3
59	June 10	Reds	2–0	**Pallante** (2–0)	Castillo (2–4)	**Helsley** (4)	45,009	33–26	W1
60	June 11	Reds	5–4	**Wittgren** (1–0)	Kuhnel (0–1)	—	43,832	34–26	W2
61	June 12	Reds	6–7	Hoffman (1–0)	**Hudson** (4–3)	Díaz (2)	43,083	34–27	L1
62	June 13	Pirates	7–5	**Gallegos** (2–2)	Stratton (3–3)	**Helsley** (5)	37,398	35–27	W1
63	June 14 (1)	Pirates	3–1	**Liberatore** (2–1)	Brubaker (0–7)	**Gallegos** (9)	31,193	36–27	W2
64	June 14 (2)	Pirates	9–1	**Mikolas** (5–4)	Wilson (0–4)	—	33,977	37–27	W3
65	June 15	Pirates	4–6	Crowe (3–3)	**Pallante** (2–1)	Bednar (11)	38,658	37–28	L1
66	June 17	@ Red Sox	5–6	Wacha (5–1)	**Wainwright** (5–5)	Houck (3)	35,251	37–29	L2
67	June 18	@ Red Sox	11–2	**Hudson** (5–3)	Crawford (1–2)	—	36,141	38–29	W1
68	June 19	@ Red Sox	4–6	Pivetta (7–5)	**Pallante** (2–2)	Houck (4)	35,989	38–30	L1
69	June 20	@ Brewers	0–2	Burnes (5–4)	**Mikolas** (5–5)	Hader (20)	28,100	38–31	L2
70	June 21	@ Brewers	6–2	**Thompson** (1–0)	Gonzalez (0–1)	—	30,208	39–31	W1
71	June 22	@ Brewers	5–4	**Oviedo** (1–1)	Lauer (6–3)	**Cabrera** (1)	27,986	40–31	W2
72	June 23	@ Brewers	4–6	Alexander (2–0)	**Hudson** (5–4)	Hader (21)	32,550	40–32	L1
73	June 24	Cubs	0–3	Hendricks (3–6)	**Pallante** (2–3)	Robertson (9)	46,524	40–33	L2
74	June 25	Cubs	5–3	**Helsley** (3–0)	Leiter Jr. (1–2)	—	45,159	41–33	W1
75	June 26	Cubs	5–6 (10)	Robertson (2–0)	**Thompson** (1–1)	—	44,824	41–34	L1
76	June 27	Marlins	9–0	**Wainwright** (6–5)	López (5–4)	—	34,701	42–34	W1
77	June 28	Marlins	5–3	**Hudson** (6–4)	Garrett (1–3)	**Helsley** (6)	32,065	43–34	W2
78	June 29	Marlins	3–4	Alcántara (8–3)	**Helsley** (3–1)	—	35,674	43–35	L1

July: 11–13 (Home: 5–4; Away: 6–9)

#	Date	Opponent	Score	Win	Loss	Save	Attendance	Record	Box / Streak
79	July 1	@ Phillies	3–5	Alvarado (2–1)	**Mikolas** (5–6)	Hand (3)	36,077	43–36	L2
80	July 2	@ Phillies	7–6	**Helsley** (4–1)	Domínguez (4–2)	—	27,657	44–36	W1
81	July 3	@ Phillies	0–4	Wheeler (7–4)	**Wainwright** (6–6)	—	44,225	44–37	L1
82	July 4	@ Braves	3–6	O'Day (2–2)	**Hudson** (6–5)	Smith (5)	41,975	44–38	L2
83	July 5	@ Braves	1–7	Anderson (7–5)	**Pallante** (2–4)	—	35,656	44–39	L3
84	July 6	@ Braves	0–3	Fried (9–2)	**Mikolas** (5–7)	Minter (2)	36,718	44–40	L4
85	July 7	@ Braves	3–2 (11)	**Helsley** (5–1)	Matzek (0–2)	**Naughton** (1)	37,756	45–40	W1
86	July 8	Phillies	0–2	Wheeler (8–4)	**Wainwright** (6–7)	Hand (4)	41,100	45–41	L1
87	July 9	Phillies	0–1	Alvarado (3–1)	**Gallegos** (2–3)	Knebel (12)	41,853	45–42	L2
88	July 10	Phillies	4–3	**Hicks** (2–4)	Domínguez (4–3)	**Helsley** (7)	36,112	46–42	W1
89	July 11	Phillies	6–1	**Mikolas** (6–7)	Nola (5–7)	—	34,399	47–42	W2
90	July 12	Dodgers	7–6	**Oviedo** (2–1)	White (1–2)	**Gallegos** (10)	37,150	48–42	W3
91	July 13	Dodgers	6–7	Kimbrel (3–4)	**Gallegos** (2–4)	Phillips (1)	39,292	48–43	L1
92	July 14	Dodgers	0–4	Anderson (10–1)	**Hudson** (6–6)	—	40,062	48–44	L2
93	July 15	Reds	7–3	**Pallante** (3–4)	Greene (3–11)	**Helsley** (8)	41,221	49–44	W1
94	July 16	Reds	11–3	**Mikolas** (7–7)	Lodolo (2–3)	—	41,014	50–44	W2
**92nd All-Star Game in Los Angeles, California**
95	July 22	@ Reds	5–9	Sanmartin (4–4)	**Wainwright** (6–8)	—	25,547	50–45	L1
96	July 23	@ Reds	6–3	**Matz** (4–3)	Minor (1–7)	**Helsley** (9)	27,190	51–45	W1
97	July 24	@ Reds	3–6	Mahle (4–7)	**Mikolas** (7–8)	Strickland (5)	18,813	51–46	L1
98	July 26	@ Blue Jays	3–10	Mayza (5–0)	**Hicks** (2–5)	—	39,756	51–47	L2
99	July 27	@ Blue Jays	6–1	**Wainwright** (7–8)	Gausman (7–8)	—	36,666	52–47	W1
100	July 29	@ Nationals	6–2	**Mikolas** (8–8)	Sánchez (0–3)	—	30,170	53–47	W2
101	July 30	@ Nationals	6–7	Ramírez (3–1)	**Cabrera** (3–2)	Finnegan (4)	34,440	53–48	L1
102	July 31	@ Nationals	5–0	**Pallante** (4–4)	Gray (7–7)	—	28,738	54–48	W1

August: 22–7 (Home: 13–2; Away: 9–5)

#	Date	Opponent	Score	Win	Loss	Save	Attendance	Record	Box / Streak
103	August 2	Cubs	6–0	**Wainwright** (8–8)	Thompson (8–5)	—	44,344	55–48	W2
104	August 4 (1)	Cubs	4–3	**Helsley** (6–1)	Uelmen (0–1)	—	41,734	56–48	W3
105	August 4 (2)	Cubs	7–2	**Hicks** (3–5)	Castro (0–1)	—	44,669	57–48	W4
106	August 5	Yankees	4–3	**Pallante** (5–4)	Holmes (5–3)	**Helsley** (10)	46,940	58–48	W5
107	August 6	Yankees	1–0	**Montgomery** (4–3)	Germán (1–2)	**Gallegos** (11)	48,581	59–48	W6
108	August 7	Yankees	12–9	**Stratton** (6–4)	Abreu (2–1)	**Helsley** (11)	46,472	60–48	W7
109	August 9	@ Rockies	5–16	Feltner (2–3)	**Mikolas** (8–9)	—	35,011	60–49	L1
110	August 10	@ Rockies	9–5	**Quintana** (4–5)	Freeland (7–8)	—	35,164	61–49	W1
111	August 11	@ Rockies	6–8	Gilbreath (1–0)	**Hicks** (3–6)	Bard (24)	30,293	61–50	L1
112	August 12	Brewers	3–1	**Montgomery** (5–3)	Lauer (8–4)	**Helsley** (12)	45,669	62–50	W1
113	August 13	Brewers	2–3 (10)	Williams (4–2)	**Gallegos** (2–5)	Bush (3)	45,905	62–51	L1
114	August 14	Brewers	6–3	**Mikolas** (9–9)	Rogers (1–6)	—	44,142	63–51	W1
115	August 16	Rockies	5–4	**Helsley** (7–1)	Lamet (1–2)	—	39,105	64–51	W2
116	August 17	Rockies	5–1	**Montgomery** (6–3)	Márquez (6–10)	—	38,033	65–51	W3
117	August 18	Rockies	13–0	**Wainwright** (9–8)	Senzatela (3–7)	—	36,137	66–51	W4
118	August 19	@ Diamondbacks	5–1	**Mikolas** (10–9)	Henry (2–2)	—	32,183	67–51	W5
119	August 20	@ Diamondbacks	16–7	**Cabrera** (4–2)	Bumgarner (6–13)	—	34,248	68–51	W6
120	August 21	@ Diamondbacks	6–4	**Woodford** (2–0)	Mantiply (1–4)	**Gallegos** (12)	25,064	69–51	W7
121	August 22	@ Cubs	1–0	**Montgomery** (7–3)	Smyly (5–7)	—	29,719	70–51	W8
122	August 23 (1)	@ Cubs	0–2	Rucker (3–1)	**Wainwright** (9–9)	Hughes (3)	27,273	70–52	L1
123	August 23 (2)	@ Cubs	13–3	**Woodford** (3–0)	Sampson (1–4)	—	28,163	71–52	W1
124	August 24	@ Cubs	1–7	Wick (4–6)	**Mikolas** (10–10)	—	32,012	71–53	L1
125	August 25	@ Cubs	8–3	**Hudson** (7–6)	Stroman (3–6)	—	28,803	72–53	W1
126	August 26	Braves	4–11	Strider (8–4)	**Quintana** (4–6)	—	46,027	72–54	L1
127	August 27	Braves	6–5	**Helsley** (8–1)	Jansen (5–1)	—	46,119	73–54	W1
128	August 28	Braves	6–3	**Helsley** (9–1)	Minter (5–4)	**Gallegos** (13)	42,897	74–54	W2
129	August 29	@ Reds	13–4	**Stratton** (7–4)	Anderson (0–1)	—	11,051	75–54	W3
130	August 30	@ Reds	1–5	Law (1–1)	**Hudson** (7–7)	—	13,271	75–55	L1
131	August 31	@ Reds	5–3 (13)	**Pallante** (6–4)	Anderson (0–2)	—	13,613	76–55	W1

September: 15–11 (Home: 10–5; Away: 5–6)

#	Date	Opponent	Score	Win	Loss	Save	Attendance	Record	Box / Streak
132	September 2	Cubs	8–0	**Montgomery** (8–3)	Sampson (1–5)	—	44,491	77–55	W2
133	September 3	Cubs	8–4	**Wainwright** (10–9)	Smyly (5–8)	—	47,816	78–55	W3
134	September 4	Cubs	2–0	**Mikolas** (11–10)	Hughes (2–2)	**Helsley** (13)	46,642	79–55	W4
135	September 5	Nationals	0–6	Sánchez (2–5)	**Flaherty** (0–1)	Thompson (1)	45,779	79–56	L1
136	September 6	Nationals	4–1	**Quintana** (5–6)	Espino (0–7)	**Helsley** (14)	37,629	80–56	W1
137	September 7	Nationals	6–5	**Woodford** (4–0)	Finnegan (5–3)	—	34,715	81–56	W2
138	September 8	Nationals	6–11	Thompson (1–0)	**Pallante** (6–5)	—	40,437	81–57	L1
139	September 9	@ Pirates	2–8	Contreras (5–4)	**Mikolas** (11–11)	—	15,718	81–58	L2
140	September 10	@ Pirates	7–5	**Gallegos** (3–5)	Crowe (5–9)	**Helsley** (15)	22,042	82–58	W1
141	September 11	@ Pirates	4–3	**Stratton** (8–4)	De Jong (4–2)	**Helsley** (16)	10,398	83–58	W2
142	September 13	Brewers	4–8	Perdomo (2–0)	**Montgomery** (8–4)	—	42,047	83–59	L1
143	September 14	Brewers	4–1	**Wainwright** (11–9)	Burnes (10–7)	**Helsley** (17)	46,459	84–59	W1
144	September 15	Reds	2–3	Anderson (1–3)	**Mikolas** (11–12)	Díaz (7)	44,901	84–60	L1
145	September 16	Reds	6–5	**Stratton** (9–4)	Gibaut (1–2)	**Helsley** (18)	47,118	85–60	W1
146	September 17 (1)	Reds	5–1	**Hudson** (8−7)	Minor (4−12)	—	46,678	86–60	W2
147	September 17 (2)	Reds	1–0 (11)	**Matz** (5–3)	Cruz (0–1)	—	48,299	87–60	W3
148	September 18	Reds	0–3	Cessa (4–3)	**Montgomery** (8–5)	Farmer (2)	47,909	87–61	L1
149	September 20	@ Padres	0–5	Clevinger (6–7)	**Wainwright** (11–10)	—	39,538	87–62	L2
150	September 21	@ Padres	0–1	Snell (8–9)	**Mikolas** (11–13)	Hader (34)	38,643	87–63	L3
151	September 22	@ Padres	5–4	**Flaherty** (1–1)	Martinez (4–4)	**Gallegos** (14)	33,389	88–63	W1
152	September 23	@ Dodgers	11–0	**Quintana** (6–6)	Heaney (3–3)	—	50,041	89–63	W2
153	September 24	@ Dodgers	2–6	Kershaw (10–3)	**Montgomery** (8–6)	—	52,527	89–64	L1
154	September 25	@ Dodgers	1–4	Grove (1–0)	**Wainwright** (11–11)	Jackson (1)	48,695	89–65	L2
155	September 27	@ Brewers	6–2	**Mikolas** (12–13)	Houser (6–10)	—	29,341	90–65	W1
156	September 28	@ Brewers	1–5	Woodruff (13–4)	**Quintana** (6–7)	—	28,835	90–66	L1
157	September 30	Pirates	2–1	**Flaherty** (2–1)	Oviedo (4–3)	**Helsley** (19)	47,032	91–66	W1

October: 2–3 (Home: 1–1; Away: 1–2)

#	Date	Opponent	Score	Win	Loss	Save	Attendance	Record	Box / Streak
158	October 1	Pirates	13–3	**Montgomery** (9–6)	Ortiz (0–2)	—	46,365	92–66	W2
159	October 2	Pirates	5–7	De Jong (6–2)	**Wainwright** (11–12)	Bednar (19)	46,680	92–67	L1
160	October 3	@ Pirates	2–3	Ramírez (4–1)	**Gallegos** (3–6)	—	12,702	92–68	L2
161	October 4	@ Pirates	8–7 (10)	**Stratton** (10–4)	De Jong (6–3)	—	12,842	93–68	W1
162	October 5	@ Pirates	3–5	Bañuelos (2–1)	**Liberatore** (2–2)	Ramírez (1)	15,319	93–69	L1

Legend: = Win = Loss
Bold = Cardinals team member

== Season standings ==
=== National League Central ===
NL Central
Team	W	L	Pct.	GB	Home	Road
St. Louis Cardinals	93	69	.574	—	53‍–‍28	40‍–‍41
Milwaukee Brewers	86	76	.531	7	46‍–‍35	40‍–‍41
Chicago Cubs	74	88	.457	19	37‍–‍44	37‍–‍44
Pittsburgh Pirates	62	100	.383	31	34‍–‍47	28‍–‍53
Cincinnati Reds	62	100	.383	31	33‍–‍48	29‍–‍52

=== National League Wild Card ===
Division leaders
Team	W	L	Pct.
Los Angeles Dodgers	111	51	.685
Atlanta Braves	101	61	.623
St. Louis Cardinals	93	69	.574

Wild Card teams (Top 3 teams qualify for postseason)
Team	W	L	Pct.	GB
New York Mets	101	61	.623	+14
San Diego Padres	89	73	.549	+2
Philadelphia Phillies	87	75	.537	—
Milwaukee Brewers	86	76	.531	1
San Francisco Giants	81	81	.500	6
Arizona Diamondbacks	74	88	.457	13
Chicago Cubs	74	88	.457	13
Miami Marlins	69	93	.426	18
Colorado Rockies	68	94	.420	19
Pittsburgh Pirates	62	100	.383	25
Cincinnati Reds	62	100	.383	25
Washington Nationals	55	107	.340	32

=== Record vs. opponents ===
2022 National League record Source: MLB Standings Grid – 2022
Team	AZ	ATL	CHC	CIN	COL	LAD	MIA	MIL	NYM	PHI	PIT	SD	SF	STL	WSH	AL
Arizona	—	2–4	4–3	3–4	9–10	5–14	5–1	4–3	2–4	3–3	4–3	5–14	10–9	2–5	4–3	12–8
Atlanta	4–2	—	3–3	4–3	6–1	2–4	13–6	3–3	10–9	11–8	7–0	3–4	4–3	4–3	14–5	13–7
Chicago	3–4	3–3	—	11–8	3–4	0–7	4–2	10–9	4–3	6–0	10–9	2–5	2–5	6–13	4–2	6–14
Cincinnati	4–3	3–4	8–11	—	2–4	0–7	4–3	6–13	1–5	1–6	7–12	0–6	4–2	7–12	3–4	12–8
Colorado	10–9	1–6	4–3	4–2	—	8–11	2–4	3–4	2–5	2–5	3–3	10–9	5–14	2–4	3–4	9–11
Los Angeles	14–5	4–2	7–0	7–0	11–8	—	6–1	4–3	3–4	3–4	1–5	14–5	15–4	4–2	3–3	15–5
Miami	1–5	6–13	2–4	3–4	4–2	1–6	—	4–3	6–13	7–12	4–3	3–4	3–4	2–4	15–4	8–12
Milwaukee	3–4	3–3	9–10	13–6	4–3	3–4	3–4	—	2–4	2–4	11–8	3–4	3–4	9–10	3–3	15–5
New York	4–2	9–10	3–4	5–1	5–2	4–3	13–6	4–2	—	14–5	6–1	2–4	4–3	5–2	14–5	9–11
Philadelphia	3–3	8–11	0–6	6–1	5–2	4–3	12–7	4–2	5–14	—	6–1	4–3	1–5	4–3	16–3	9–11
Pittsburgh	3–4	0–7	9–10	12–7	3–3	5–1	3–4	8–11	1–6	1–6	—	2–4	1–5	6–13	4–3	4–16
San Diego	14–5	4–3	5–2	6–0	9–10	5–14	4–3	4–3	4–2	3–4	4–2	—	13–6	2–4	4–3	8–12
San Francisco	9–10	3–4	5–2	2–4	14–5	4–15	4–3	4–3	3–4	5–1	5–1	6–13	—	3–4	4–2	10–10
St. Louis	5–2	3–4	13–6	12–7	4–2	2–4	4–2	10–9	2–5	3–4	13–6	4–2	4–3	—	4–3	10–10
Washington	3–4	5–14	2–4	4–3	4–3	3–3	4–15	3–3	5–14	3–16	3–4	3–4	2–4	3–4	—	8–12

Updated with the results of all games through October 5, 2022.

== Roster ==
2022 St. Louis Cardinals
Roster
Pitchers: 67 Aaron Brooks; 92 Génesis Cabrera; 44 Junior Fernández; 22 Jack Flaherty; 65 Giovanny Gallegos; 56 Ryan Helsley; 12 Jordan Hicks; 43 Dakota Hudson; 52 Matthew Liberatore; 32 Steven Matz; 62 T. J. McFarland; 39 Miles Mikolas; 48 Jordan Montgomery; 68 James Naile; 70 Packy Naughton; 59 Johan Oviedo; 53 Andre Pallante; 62,63 José Quintana; 59 JoJo Romero; 60 Ángel Rondón; 30 Chris Stratton; 57 Zack Thompson; 34 Drew VerHagen; 50 Adam Wainwright; 61 Jake Walsh; 38 Kodi Whitley; 30 Nick Wittgren; 40 Jake Woodford	Catchers: 47 Iván Herrera; 7 Andrew Knizner; 4 Yadier Molina; 35 Austin Romine; Infielders: 28 Nolan Arenado; 11 Paul DeJong; 33 Brendan Donovan; 19 Tommy Edman; 46 Paul Goldschmidt; 16 Nolan Gorman; 5 Albert Pujols; 35 Kramer Robertson; 63 Edmundo Sosa; 18 Cory Spangenberg	Outfielders: 48 Harrison Bader; 41 Alec Burleson; 71 Conner Capel; 3 Dylan Carlson; 26 Ben DeLuzio; 25 Corey Dickerson; 21 Lars Nootbaar; 27 Tyler O'Neill; 36 Juan Yepez	Manager: 37 Oliver Marmol; Coaches: 54 Jeff Albert (hitting); 90 Dusty Blake (pitching strategist); 82 Stubby Clapp (first base); 88 Patrick Elkins (run production); 72 Bryan Eversgerd (bullpen); 31 Mike Maddux (pitching); 51 Willie McGee (assistant coach); 94 Jamie Pogue (bullpen catcher); 55 Skip Schumaker (bench); 76 Kleininger Teran (bullpen catcher); 49 Turner Ward (assistant hitting); 75 Ron 'Pop' Warner (third base)

== Postseason ==
=== Postseason Game log ===
2022 Postseason (0–2)
National League Wild Card Series (0–2)

Game	Date	Opponent	Score	Win	Loss	Save	Attendance	Record
1	October 7	Phillies	3–6	Robertson (1–0)	Helsley (0–1)	—	45,911	0–1
2	October 8	Phillies	0–2	Nola (1–0)	Mikolas (0–1)	Eflin (1)	48,515	0–2

=== Postseason rosters ===
Playoff rosters
National League Wild Card Series

- Pitchers: 12 Jordan Hicks 22 Jack Flaherty 32 Steven Matz 39 Miles Mikolas 48 Jordan Montgomery 50 Adam Wainwright 53 Andre Pallante 56 Ryan Helsley 57 Zack Thompson 62 José Quintana 65 Giovanny Gallegos 70 Packy Naughton
- Catchers: 4 Yadier Molina 7 Andrew Knizner
- Infielders: 11 Paul DeJong 16 Nolan Gorman 19 Tommy Edman 28 Nolan Arenado 33 Brendan Donovan 46 Paul Goldschmidt
- Outfielders: 3 Dylan Carlson 21 Lars Nootbaar 25 Corey Dickerson 26 Ben DeLuzio 36 Juan Yepez
- Designated hitters: 5 Albert Pujols

== Statistics ==
=== Batting ===
(through October 5, 2022)
Players in bold are on the active roster.
Note: G = Games played; AB = At bats; R = Runs; H = Hits; 2B = Doubles; 3B = Triples; HR = Home runs; RBI = Runs batted in; SB = Stolen bases; BB = Bases on balls; SO = Strikeouts; BA = Batting average; OBP = On-base percentage; SLG = Slugging percentage; OPS = On-base percentage plus slugging; TB = Total bases

Player	G	AB	R	H	2B	3B	HR	RBI	SB	BB	SO	BA	OBP	SLG	OPS	TB
**Nolan Arenado**	148	557	73	163	42	1	30	103	5	52	72	.293	.358	.533	.891	297
Harrison Bader	72	246	35	63	7	3	5	21	15	13	47	.256	.303	.370	.673	91
**Alec Burleson**	16	48	4	9	1	0	1	3	1	5	9	.188	.264	.271	.535	13
Conner Capel	9	17	1	3	0	0	1	2	0	1	2	.176	.211	.353	.563	6
**Dylan Carlson**	128	432	56	102	30	4	8	42	5	45	94	.236	.316	.380	.695	164
**Paul DeJong**	77	210	19	33	9	0	6	25	3	21	79	.157	.245	.286	.530	60
Ben DeLuzio	22	20	3	3	1	0	0	0	0	3	5	.150	.292	.200	.492	4
**Corey Dickerson**	96	281	28	75	17	1	6	36	0	12	48	.267	.300	.399	.698	112
**Brendan Donovan**	126	391	64	110	21	1	5	45	2	60	70	.281	.394	.379	.773	148
**Tommy Edman**	153	577	95	153	31	4	13	57	32	46	111	.265	.324	.400	.725	231
**Paul Goldschmidt**	151	561	106	178	41	0	35	115	7	79	141	.317	.404	.578	.981	324
**Nolan Gorman**	89	283	44	64	13	0	14	35	1	28	103	.226	.300	.420	.721	119
Iván Herrera	11	18	0	2	0	0	0	1	0	2	8	.111	.190	.111	.302	2
**Andrew Knizner**	96	260	28	56	10	0	4	25	0	26	62	.215	.301	.300	.601	78
**Yadier Molina**	78	262	19	56	8	0	5	24	2	5	40	.214	.233	.302	.535	79
**Lars Nootbaar**	108	290	53	66	16	3	14	40	4	51	71	.228	.340	.448	.778	130
**Tyler O'Neill**	96	334	56	76	11	1	14	58	14	38	103	.228	.308	.392	.700	131
**Albert Pujols**	109	307	42	83	14	0	24	68	1	28	55	.270	.345	.550	.895	169
Kramer Robertson	2	1	0	0	0	0	0	1	0	0	0	.000	.000	.000	.000	0
Austin Romine	11	26	2	4	1	0	0	0	0	2	7	.154	.214	.192	.407	5
Edmundo Sosa	53	122	17	23	4	3	0	8	3	4	38	.189	.244	.270	.515	33
Cory Spangenberg	1	0	0	0	0	0	0	0	0	0	0	.---	.---	.---	.---	0
Juan Yepez	76	253	27	64	13	0	12	30	0	16	61	.253	.296	.447	.742	113
**TEAM TOTALS**	162	5,496	772	1,386	290	21	197	739	95	537	1,226	.252	.325	.420	.745	2,309

=== Pitching ===
(through October 5, 2022)
Players in bold are on the active roster.
Note: W = Wins; L = Losses; ERA = Earned run average; WHIP = Walks plus hits per inning pitched; G = Games pitched; GS = Games started; SV = Saves; IP = Innings pitched; H = Hits allowed; R = Runs allowed; ER = Earned runs allowed; BB = Bases on balls allowed; SO = Strikeouts

Player	W	L	ERA	WHIP	G	GS	SV	IP	H	R	ER	BB	SO
Aaron Brooks	0	0	7.71	1.39	5	0	0	9.1	11	8	8	2	7
**Génesis Cabrera**	4	2	4.63	1.32	39	0	1	44.2	39	24	23	20	32
**Corey Dickerson**	0	0	0.00	3.00	1	0	0	1.0	2	0	0	1	0
Junior Fernández	0	0	2.93	1.63	13	0	0	15.1	17	6	5	8	12
Jack Flaherty	2	1	4.25	1.61	9	8	0	36.0	36	18	17	22	33
**Giovanny Gallegos**	3	6	3.05	1.02	57	0	14	59.0	42	23	20	18	73
**Ryan Helsley**	9	1	1.25	0.74	54	0	19	64.2	28	11	9	20	94
**Jordan Hicks**	3	6	4.84	1.32	35	8	0	61.1	46	33	33	35	63
**Dakota Hudson**	8	7	4.45	1.45	27	26	0	139.2	141	71	69	61	78
**Andrew Knizner**	0	0	0.00	1.50	1	0	0	0.2	1	0	0	0	0
Matthew Liberatore	2	2	5.97	1.73	9	7	0	34.2	42	23	23	18	28
Steven Matz	5	3	5.25	1.25	15	10	0	48.0	50	28	28	10	54
**T. J. McFarland**	0	0	6.61	1.62	28	0	0	32.2	42	26	24	11	16
**Miles Mikolas**	12	13	3.29	1.03	33	32	0	202.1	170	81	74	39	153
**Yadier Molina**	0	0	18.00	3.00	2	0	0	2.0	6	4	4	0	1
**Jordan Montgomery**	6	3	3.11	1.08	11	11	0	63.2	56	24	22	13	61
James Naile	0	0	5.00	1.11	7	0	0	9.0	8	5	5	2	5
**Packy Naughton**	0	2	4.78	1.44	26	3	1	32.0	39	17	17	7	31
Johan Oviedo	2	1	3.20	1.30	14	1	0	25.1	26	9	9	7	26
**Andre Pallante**	6	5	3.17	1.42	47	10	0	108.0	113	39	38	40	73
**Albert Pujols**	0	0	36.00	4.00	1	0	0	1.0	3	4	4	1	0
**José Quintana**	3	2	2.01	1.12	12	12	0	62.2	54	18	14	16	48
**JoJo Romero**	0	0	3.77	1.26	15	0	0	14.1	9	6	6	9	16
Ángel Rondón	1	0	0.00	0.80	1	0	0	5.0	1	0	0	3	4
**Chris Stratton**	5	0	2.78	1.50	20	0	0	22.2	22	8	7	12	23
Zack Thompson	1	1	2.08	0.98	22	1	1	34.2	20	9	8	14	27
Drew VerHagen	3	1	6.65	1.89	19	0	0	21.2	27	18	16	14	18
**Adam Wainwright**	11	12	3.71	1.28	32	32	0	191.2	192	80	79	54	143
Jake Walsh	0	1	13.50	1.88	3	0	0	2.2	3	4	4	2	5
Kodi Whitley	2	0	5.68	1.58	14	0	0	12.2	11	8	8	9	12
Nick Wittgren	1	0	5.90	1.55	29	0	1	29.0	35	19	19	10	17
Jake Woodford	4	0	2.23	1.12	27	1	0	48.1	43	13	12	11	24
**TEAM TOTALS**	93	69	3.79	1.27	162	162	37	1,435.2	1,335	637	605	489	1,177

== Awards and achievements ==
=== Awards ===
- National League MVP
  - Paul Goldschmidt
- National League (NL) Player of the Month:
  - Nolan Arenado (2), April, August
  - Paul Goldschmidt, May
- NL Player of the Week:
  - Nolan Arenado (2), April 7–10, August 1–7
  - Paul Goldschmidt (3), June 13–19, July 21–24, August 15–21
  - Albert Pujols (2), August 15–21, September 19–25

=== Milestones ===
- Games played: 3,000 – Albert Pujols – June 4
- At bats: 5,000 – Nolan Arenado – July 2
- 700th career home run -- Albert Pujols -- September 23

== Minor league system and first-year player draft ==
=== Teams ===
Level	Team	League	Division	Manager	W–L/Stats	Standing	Refs
Triple-A	Memphis Redbirds	International League	West	Ben Johnson	73–77	6th of 10	
Double-A	Springfield Cardinals	Texas League	North	José Leger	68–70	4th of 5	
High-A	Peoria Chiefs	Midwest League	West	Patrick Anderson	56–76	5th of 6	
Single-A	Palm Beach Cardinals	Florida State League	East	Gary Kendall	67–61	2nd of 4, Lost in Semifinals	
Rookie	FCL Cardinals	Florida Complex League	East	Roberto Espinoza	25–29	5th of 6	
Foreign Rookie	DSL Cardinals	Dominican Summer League	South	Fray Peniche	33–26	4th of 9	

=== Major League Baseball draft ===
The 2022 Major League Baseball (MLB) First-Year Player Draft began on Sunday, July 17, and ended on Tuesday, July 19. The draft assigned amateur baseball players to MLB teams.

2022 St. Louis Cardinals complete draft list

Round	Pick	Name, Age	Pos / Bats	School (State)	Signing bonus
1	22	Cooper Hjerpe, 21	LHP / L	Oregon State University (OR)	$3.18 million
2	59	Brycen Mautz, 21	LHP / L	University of San Diego (CA)	$1.10 million
3	97	Pete Hansen, 21	LHP / R	University of Texas (TX)	$629,800
4	127	Jimmy Crooks, 21	C / L	University of Oklahoma (OK)	$470,300
5	157	Victor Scott II, 21	OF / L	West Virginia University (WV)	$350,400
6	187	Max Rajcic, 20	RHP / R	UCLA (CA)	$600,000
7	217	Alex Iadisernia, 21	OF / L	Elon University (NC)	$212,000
8	247	Cade Winquest, 22	RHP / R	University of Texas at Arlington (TX)	$174,600
9	277	Joseph King, 21	RHP / R	University of California (CA)	$125,000
10	307	Tanner Jacobson, 22	RHP / R	Queens University of Charlotte (NC)	$25,000
11	337	Nathan Church, 21	OF / L	University of California, Irvine (CA)	$125,000
12	367	Michael Curialle, 21	SS / R	UCLA (CA)	$150,000
13	397	Chandler Arnold, 22	RHP / R	Dallas Baptist University (TX)	$175,000
14	427	D.J. Carpenter, 22	RHP / R	Oregon State University (OR)	$100,000
15	457	Matt Hickey, 23	RHP / L	Tarleton State University (TX)	$25,000
16	487	Hunter Hayes, 21	RHP / R	University of the Pacific (CA)	$100,000
17	517	Brody Moore, 21	SS / R	Auburn University (AL)	$50,000
18	547	John Lynch, 21	LHP / L	Xavier University (OH)	$125,000
19	577	Chris Rotondo, 23	OF / R	Villanova University (PA)	$25,000
20	607	Gavin Van Kempen, 18	RHP / R	Maple Hill High School (NY)	Did not sign
