= Dylan Carlson (baseball) =

American baseball player (born 1998)

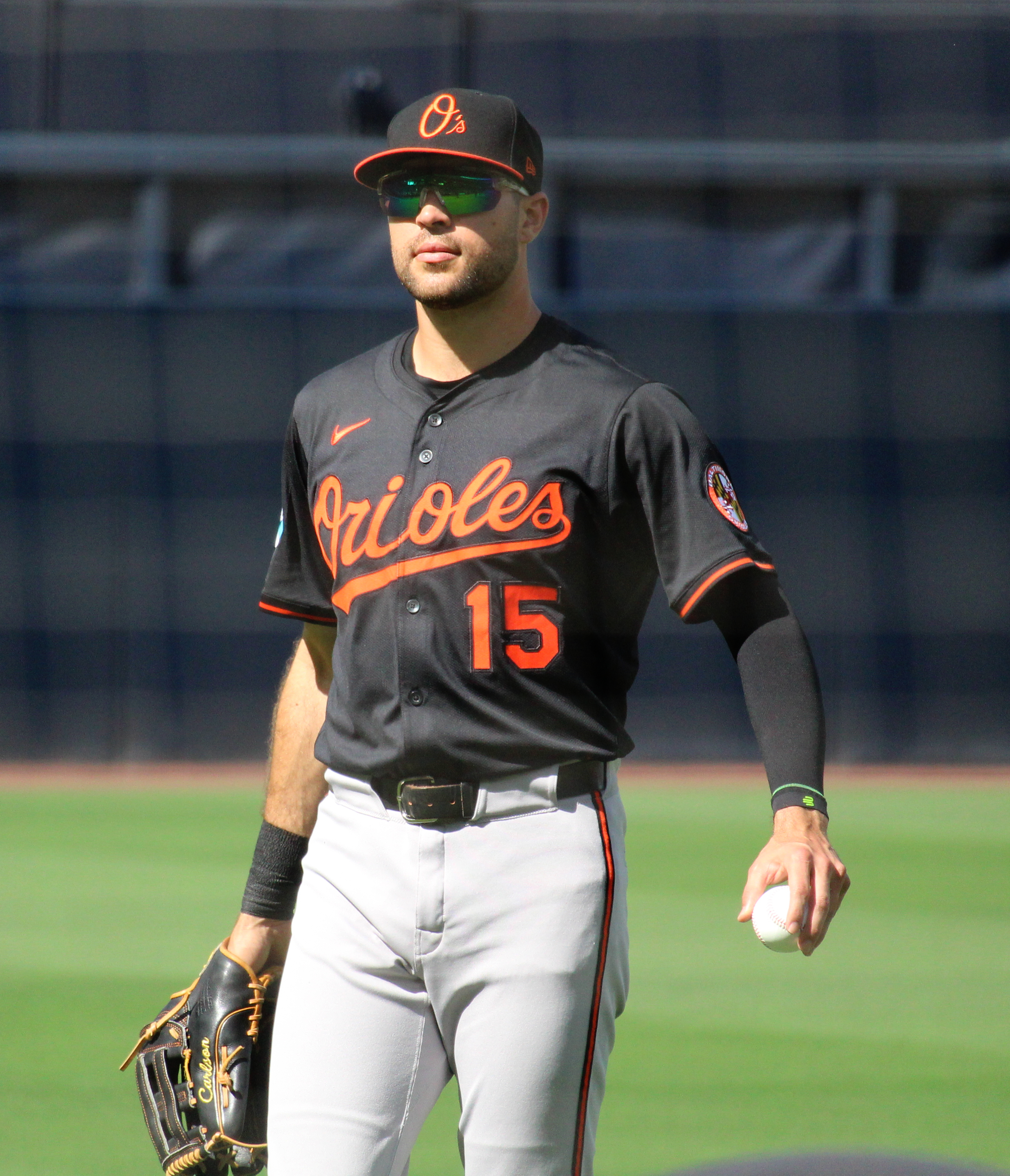
- Carlson with the Baltimore Orioles in 2025

Free agent
- Outfielder
- Born: October 23, 1998 (age 28); Elk Grove, California, U.S.
- Bats: Switch Throws: Left

MLB debut
- August 15, 2020, for the St. Louis Cardinals

MLB statistics (through 2026 season)
- Batting average: .233
- Home runs: 43
- Runs batted in: 195
- Stats at Baseball Reference

Teams
- St. Louis Cardinals (2020–2024); Tampa Bay Rays (2024); Baltimore Orioles (2025); Chicago Cubs (2026)

Dylan James Carlson (born October 23, 1998) is an American professional baseball outfielder who is a free agent. He has previously played in Major League Baseball (MLB) for the St. Louis Cardinals, Tampa Bay Rays, Baltimore Orioles, and Chicago Cubs.

Selected by the Cardinals in the first round of the 2016 MLB draft, Carlson became one of the top prospects in baseball before making his MLB debut in 2020. He became the team's starting right fielder in 2021 and was a finalist for National League Rookie of the Year. The Cardinals traded him to the Rays in 2024.

== Amateur career ==
Carlson attended Elk Grove High School in Elk Grove, California where he played baseball under his father, Jeff, and was teammates with Nick Madrigal, Rowdy Tellez, Dom Núñez, and Derek Hill. He began playing on the varsity team as a 14-year-old freshman. As a senior, he batted .407 with nine home runs and 40 RBIs in 36 games and pitched to a 6–0 record with a 1.44 ERA.

== Professional career ==
=== St. Louis Cardinals ===
==== Minor leagues ====
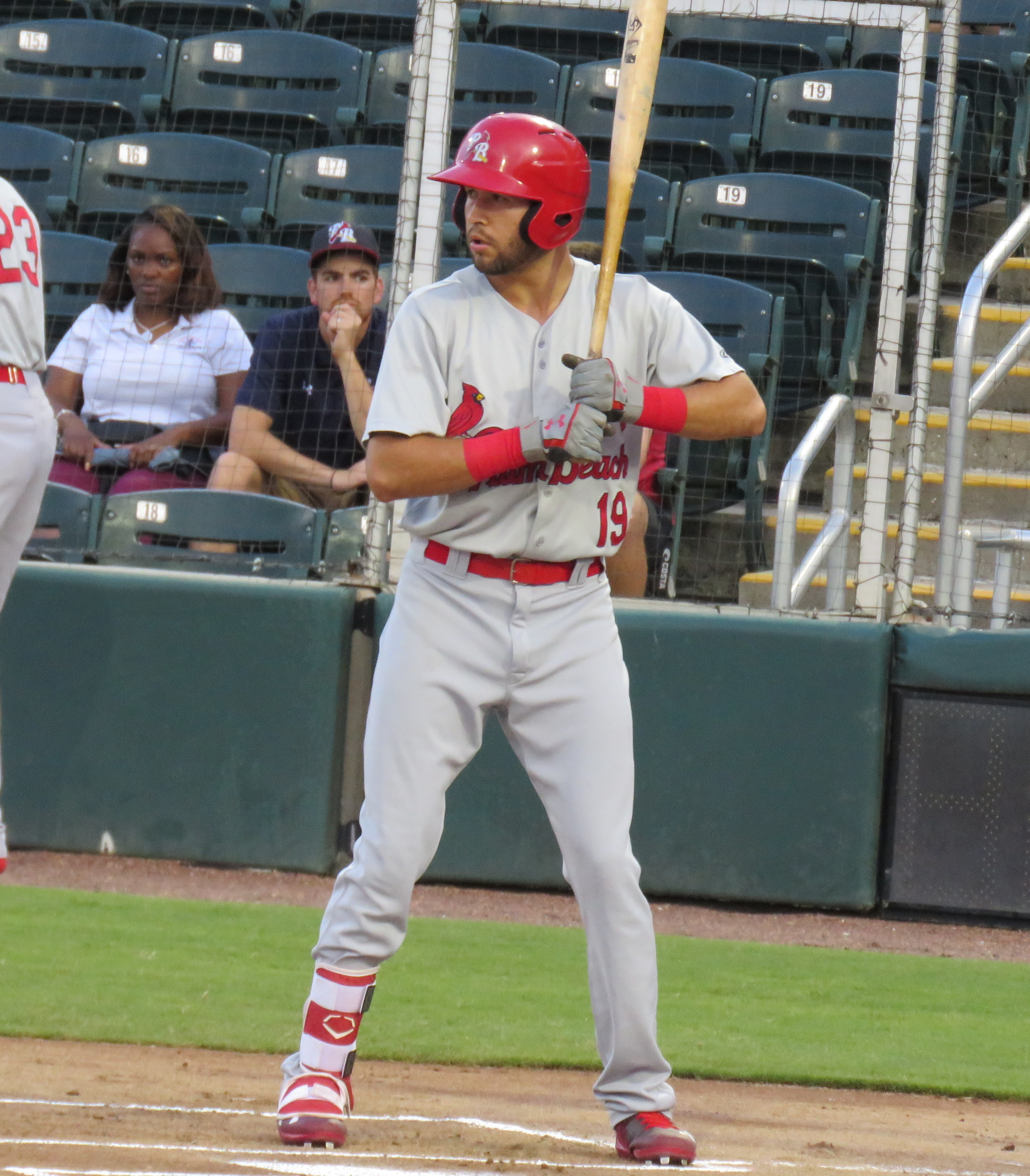
Carlson with the Palm Beach Cardinals in 2018

Despite not being considered or named a Top 200 prospect for the 2016 Major League Baseball (MLB) draft by MLB.com, Carlson was selected by the St. Louis Cardinals in the first round, with the 33rd overall pick. He rescinded his college commitment to Cal State Fullerton and agreed to a signing bonus of $1.35 million, which was $550,500 under the slot value.

Carlson made his professional debut that same year with the Gulf Coast League Cardinals, batting .251 with three home runs and 22 RBI in 50 games. Carlson spent 2017 with the Peoria Chiefs where he slashed .240/.342/.347 with seven home runs and 42 RBI in 115 games. He began the 2018 season with Peoria, and after batting .234 with two home runs and nine RBI in 13 games, was promoted to the Palm Beach Cardinals. Carlson finished the year with Palm Beach, slashing .247/.345/.386 with nine home runs and 53 RBI in 99 games.

Carlson began the 2019 season with the Springfield Cardinals. He was named a Texas League All-Star and participated in the Home Run Derby. In July, he represented the Cardinals in the 2019 All-Star Futures Game alongside Nolan Gorman. After slashing .281/.364/.518 with 21 home runs, 59 RBI, and 18 stolen bases over 108 games with Springfield, he was promoted to the Memphis Redbirds in August. Following his promotion, Carlson was named the Texas League Player of the Year. He played in 18 games with Memphis, batting .361 with five home runs and nine RBIs. Over a total of 126 games between Springfield and Memphis, Carlson slashed .292/.372/.542 with 26 home runs, 68 RBI, and 20 stolen bases. He was originally selected to play in the Arizona Fall League for the Glendale Desert Dogs following the season, but it was later announced he would not be participating.

==== Major leagues ====
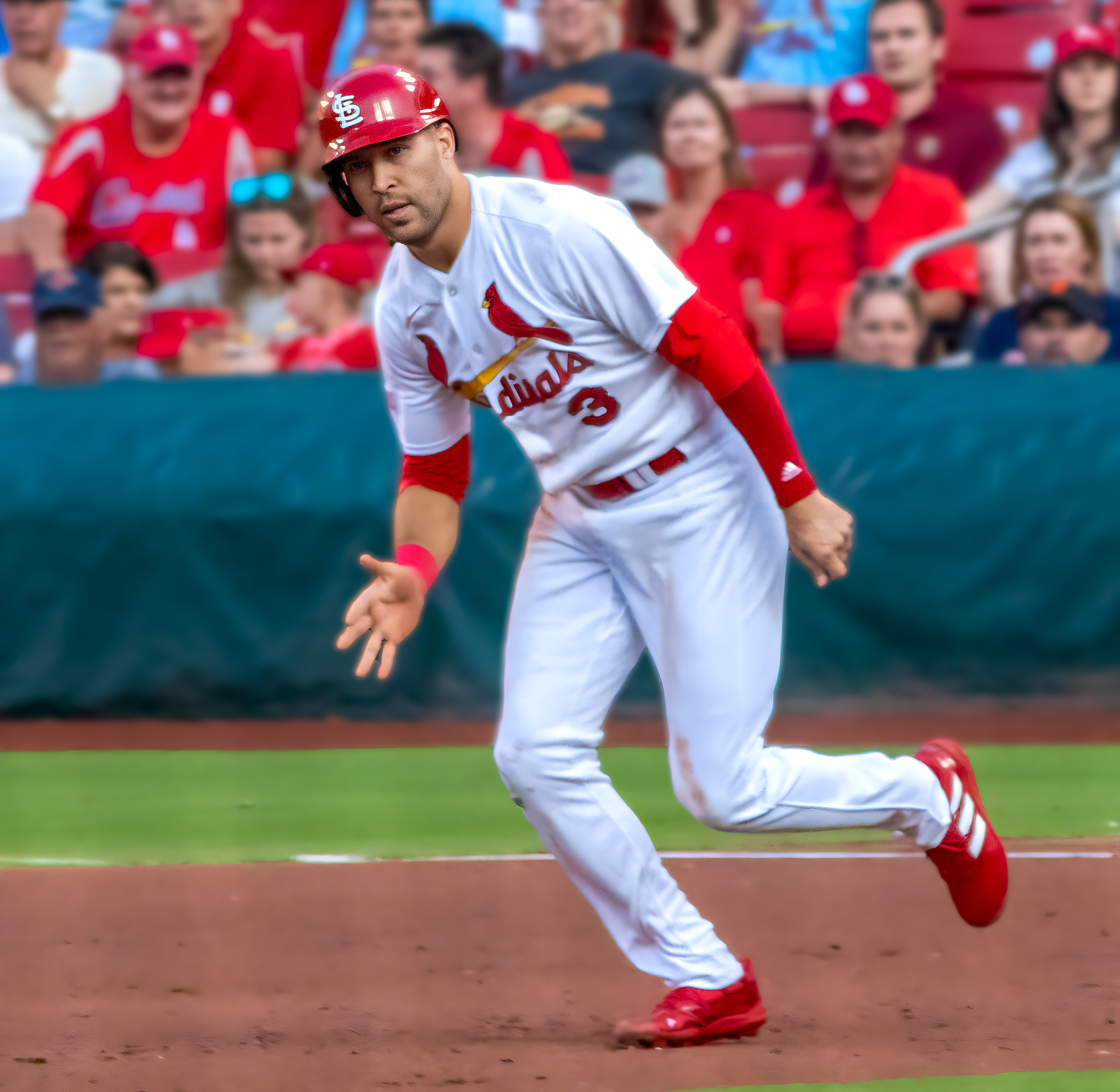
Carlson in 2023

The Cardinals promoted Carlson to the major leagues on August 15, 2020, and he made his MLB debut that day against the Chicago White Sox. On August 23, he hit his first career home run. He finished the 2020 season slashing .200/.252/.364 with three home runs and 16 RBIs over 35 games.

Carlson returned in 2021 as St. Louis' starting center fielder, taking over for the injured Harrison Bader. When Bader returned from the injured list, Carlson moved to right field. On April 7, 2021, he hit his first career grand slam against Zach Pop of the Miami Marlins at LoanDepot Park. Carlson finished the 2021 season with 542 at-bats over 149 games, slashing .266/.343/.437 with 18 home runs, 65 RBIs, and 31 doubles. He was a finalist for the National League Rookie of the Year Award, alongside Jonathan India and Trevor Rogers.

Carlson opened the 2022 season as the club's starting right fielder. In late May, he was placed on the injured list with a hamstring injury. He was activated in early June. Carlson hit the final of a record-tying four consecutive home runs between teammates on July 2, 2022, the 11th such occurrence in major league history. At Citizens Bank Park in Philadelphia, Nolan Arenado, Nolan Gorman, Juan Yepez and Carlson all homered off Phillies starter Kyle Gibson with two outs in the first inning. It was the first time that the Cardinals had accomplished the feat, and the first time that it occurred in the first inning. In early September, Carlson was placed on the injured list with a thumb sprain before being activated a little over a week later. Over 432 at-bats in 128 games, he slashed .236/.316/.380 with eight home runs, 42 RBI, and 30 doubles.

In 2023, Carlson played in 76 games for St. Louis, batting .219/.318/.333 with five home runs, 27 RBI, and three stolen bases. On August 12, 2023, Carlson was placed on the injured list with a left oblique strain and left ankle injury. On September 13, manager Oliver Marmol announced that Carlson would undergo season–ending surgery on his left ankle.

==== 2024 ====
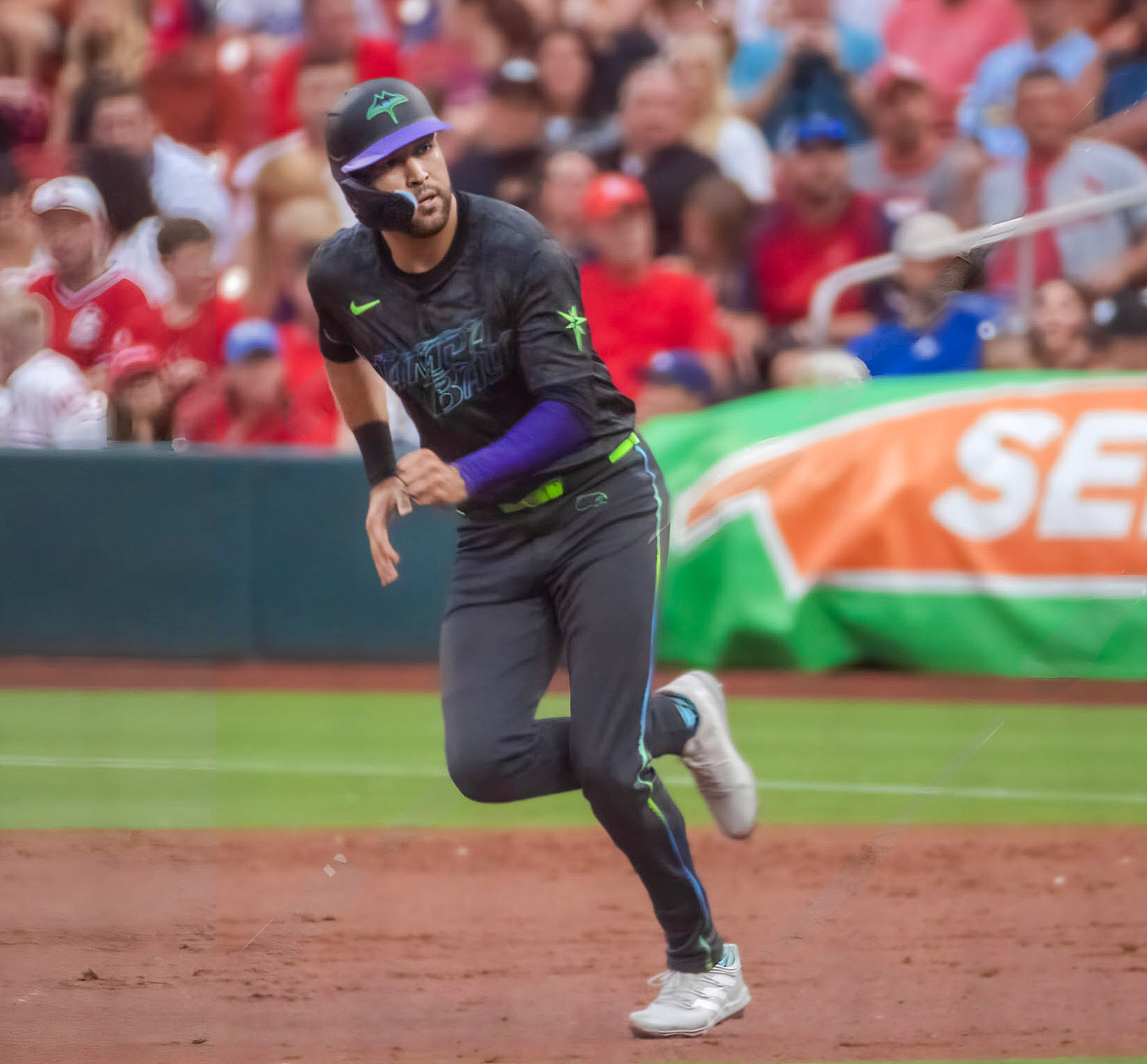
Carlson in 2024

Carlson led the team in Spring Training with three home runs and 13 RBIs, before a collision with right fielder Jordan Walker with both chasing a fly ball on March 25. Carlson suffered an injury to his left shoulder after falling hard on the warning track after the collision, also hurting his hip and ankle. An MRI exam that night revealed damage to his left shoulder, putting him on the IL for a few weeks. In 59 games for the Cardinals, he batted .198/.275/.240 with no home runs and 11 RBI.

=== Tampa Bay Rays ===
On July 30, 2024, the Cardinals traded Carlson to the Tampa Bay Rays in exchange for Shawn Armstrong. In 37 games for Tampa Bay, he slashed .219/.299/.316 with three home runs, 14 RBI, and two stolen bases. On November 22, the Rays non-tendered Carlson, making him a free agent.

=== Baltimore Orioles ===
On January 27, 2025, Carlson signed a one-year, $975,000 contract with the Baltimore Orioles. He was optioned to the Triple-A Norfolk Tides to begin the season. The Orioles called him up on March 31, following an injury to Colton Cowser, then again on April 26, as former Cardinals teammate Tyler O'Neill went on the injured list. Carlson made 83 total appearances for the Orioles during the regular season, batting .203/.278/.336 with six home runs, 20 RBI, and three stolen bases. On November 6, Carlson was removed from the 40-man roster and sent outright to Norfolk. He became a free agent the same day.

=== Chicago Cubs ===
On January 26, 2026, Carlson signed a minor league contract with the Chicago Cubs. On March 24, Carlson's contract was selected by the Cubs after he made the team's Opening Day roster. In three games for Chicago, he went 0-for-4 with two strikeouts. On April 10, Carlson was designated for assignment by the Cubs. On April 12, Carlson cleared waivers and was sent outright to the Triple-A Iowa Cubs; he elected free agency two days later. On April 18, Carlson re-signed with the Cubs on a minor league contract. He was released on May 4.

=== Philadelphia Phillies ===
On May 12, 2026, Carlson signed a minor league contract with the Philadelphia Phillies. He made 40 appearances for the Triple–A Lehigh Valley IronPigs, hitting .181/.307/.307 with four home runs, 18 RBI, and one stolen base. Carlson was released by the Phillies on July 10.

== Personal life ==
Carlson's younger brother, Tanner, played college baseball for the Texas Longhorns and Long Beach State Dirtbags. Their father, Jeff, coached them in high school. Their mother, Caryn, is a breast cancer survivor. Despite growing up in California, Carlson grew up a fan of the New York Yankees, becoming a fan of the team at age 10. His favorite player was Derek Jeter.
