= Nolan Gorman =

American baseball player (born 2000)

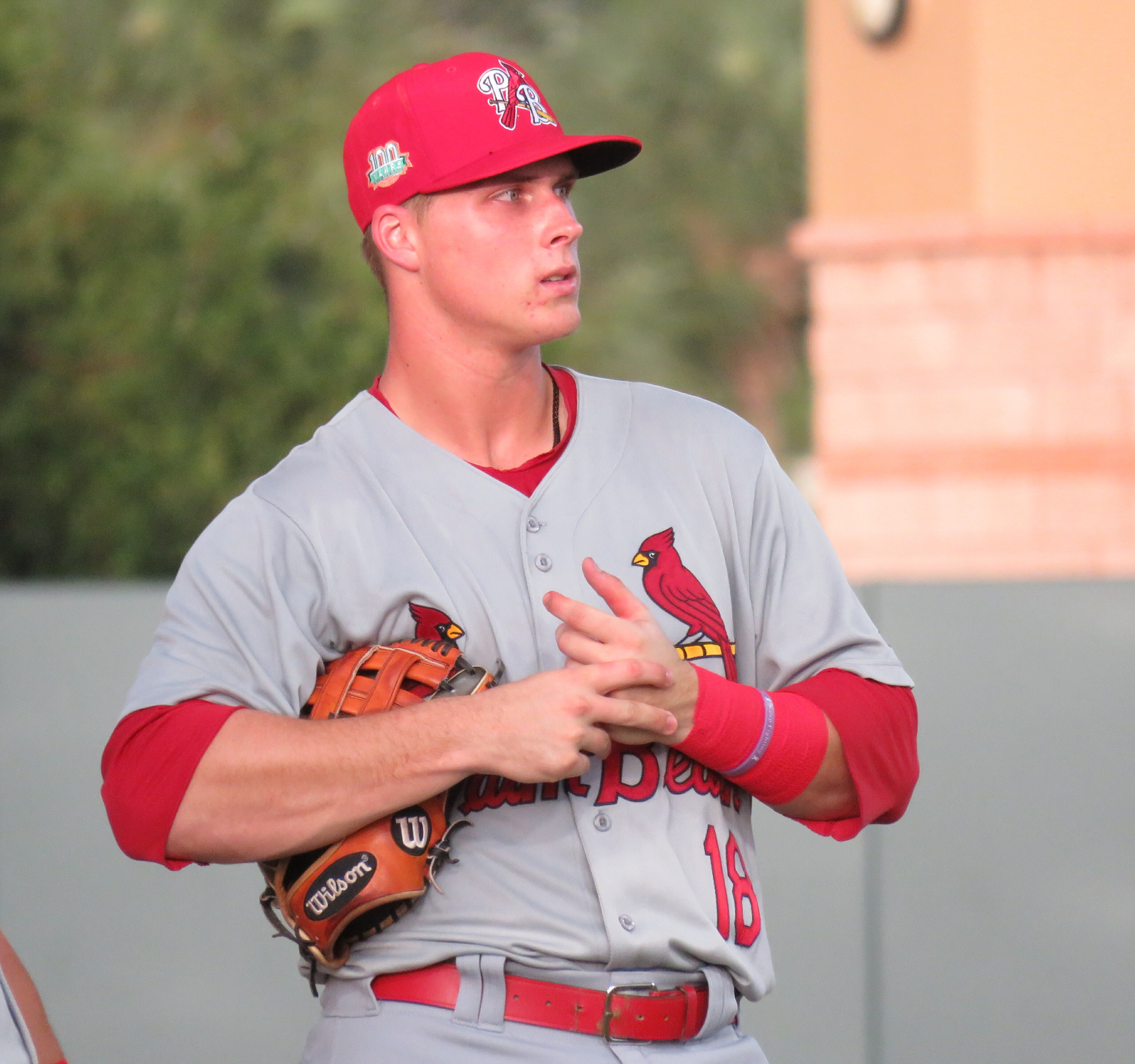
- Gorman with the Palm Beach Cardinals in 2019

Free agent
- Infielder
- Born: May 10, 2000 (age 26); Phoenix, Arizona, U.S.
- Bats: Left Throws: Right

MLB debut
- May 20, 2022, for the St. Louis Cardinals

MLB statistics (through 2026 season)
- Batting average: .212
- Home runs: 83
- Runs batted in: 240
- Stats at Baseball Reference

Teams
- St. Louis Cardinals (2022–2026)
Medals
Men's baseball
Representing United States
U-18 Baseball World Cup
Gold medal – first place	2017 Thunder Bay	Team

Nolan Brian Gorman (born May 10, 2000) is an American professional baseball infielder who is a free agent. He has previously played in Major League Baseball (MLB) for the St. Louis Cardinals.

Born and raised in Phoenix, Arizona, Gorman was drafted by the Cardinals out of high school in the 2018 Major League Baseball draft. Gorman became one of the top prospects in baseball and played in the Cardinals' minor-league system before making his MLB debut in 2022.

== Amateur career ==
Gorman attended Sandra Day O'Connor High School in Phoenix. He committed to play college baseball at the University of Arizona in August 2015. In 2016, as a sophomore, he batted .490 with 11 home runs and 49 RBIs, and in 2017, as a junior, he batted .361 with 11 home runs and 34 RBIs. That July, he won in the MLB High School Home Run Derby in Miami, Florida. Later that month, he played in the Under Armour All-America Baseball Game and won its home run derby. In September 2017, he played for the USA Baseball 18U National Team, helping lead Team USA to its fourth consecutive gold medal. In 2018, as a senior, Gorman slashed .421/.641/.894 with 10 home runs, helping lead O'Connor to a 6A baseball state championship.

== Professional career ==
=== Minor leagues ===
The St. Louis Cardinals picked Gorman in the first round, with the 19th overall selection, of the 2018 Major League Baseball draft. He signed with St. Louis for $3.231 million and was assigned to the Johnson City Cardinals of the Rookie Appalachian League. He homered in the second at-bat of his first professional game. During his stint in Johnson City, he was named an Appalachian League All-Star along with being named the league's Player of the Week for July 30 to August 5. After batting .345/.440/.662 with 11 home runs and 28 RBIs in 37 games, he was promoted to the Peoria Chiefs of the Class A Midwest League in August. He finished the season with Peoria, batting .202 with six home runs and 16 RBIs in 25 games.

Gorman returned to Peoria to begin the 2019 season. He was named the Midwest League's first Player of the Week for the season on April 15 after batting .395 with four home runs and 13 RBIs. In June, he was named to the Midwest League All-Star Game, and competed in the Home Run Derby. On June 19, he was promoted to the Palm Beach Cardinals of the Class A-Advanced Florida State League. In July, he represented the Cardinals in the 2019 All-Star Futures Game alongside Dylan Carlson. Over 125 games between Peoria and Palm Beach, Gorman slashed .248/.326/.439 with 15 home runs and 62 RBIs.

After the Cardinals acquired All-Star third baseman Nolan Arenado before the 2021 season, Gorman began practicing at second base after being a third baseman throughout his career. To begin the 2021 season, Gorman was assigned to the Springfield Cardinals of the Double-A Central. On June 12, 2021, in a game against the Arkansas Travelers, he became the first Springfield player to hit three home runs in a regular-season game. After slashing .288/.354/.508 with 11 home runs and 27 RBIs over 43 games, he was promoted to the Memphis Redbirds of the Triple-A East in late June. That same month, Gorman was selected to represent the Cardinals (alongside Matthew Liberatore) in his second All-Star Futures Game. Over 76 games with Memphis, Gorman slashed .274/.320/.465 with 14 home runs and 48 RBIs. He was selected to play in the Arizona Fall League for the Glendale Desert Dogs after the season where he was named to the Fall Stars Game.

=== Major leagues ===
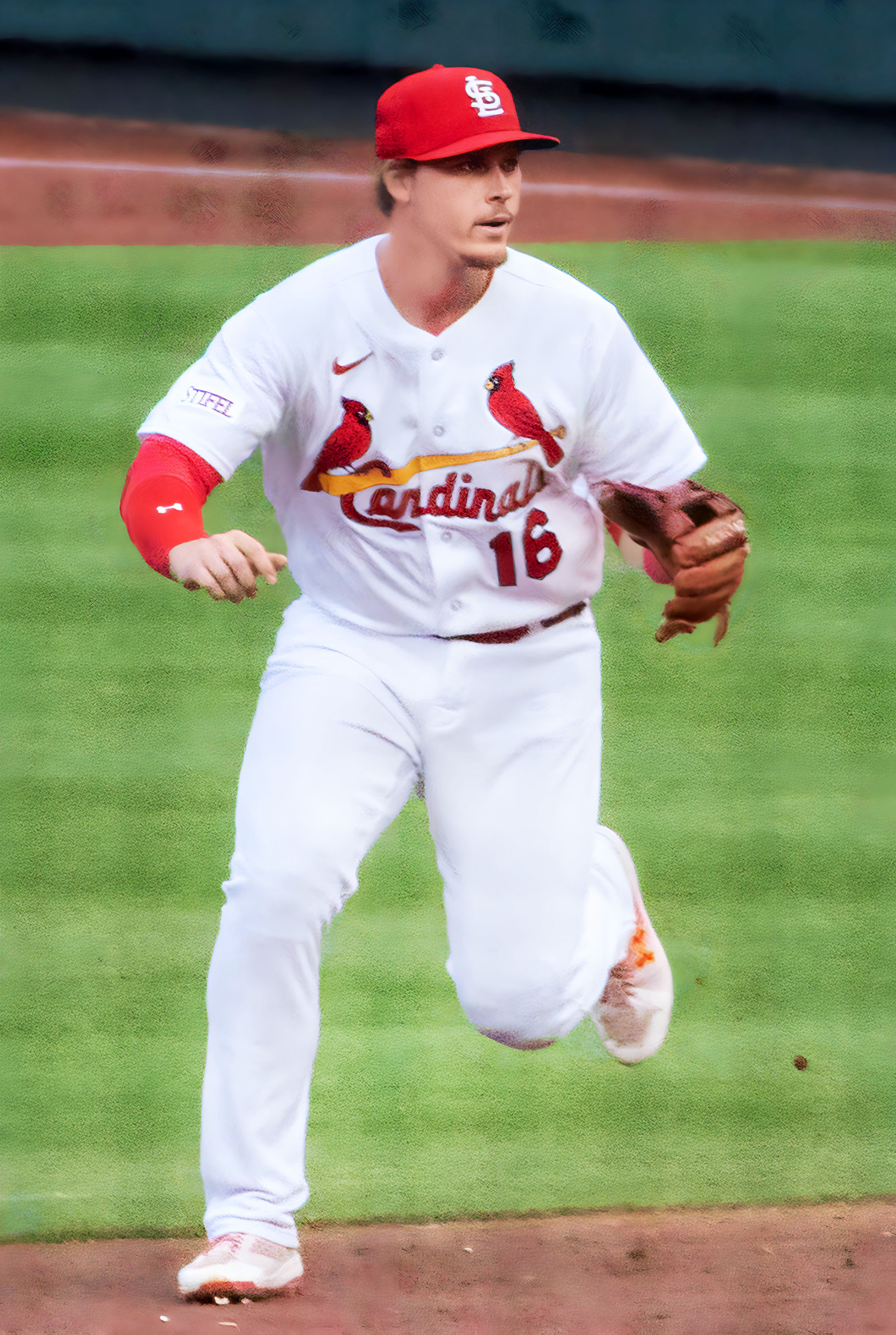
Gorman playing second base for the Cardinals in 2023

Gorman returned to Memphis to begin the 2022 season. After slashing .308/.367/.677 with 15 home runs and 23 RBIs in 34 games, the Cardinals announced on May 19 that they would be selecting his contract and promoting him to the major leagues to make his MLB debut the next day as the starting second baseman. In his first at-bat, he singled against Zach Thompson of the Pittsburgh Pirates, and finished the night one-for-three with a walk. On May 28, Gorman hit his first MLB home run versus Adrian Houser of the Milwaukee Brewers in an 8–3 win. On June 21, against the Brewers, he had his first two–home run game.

Gorman hit the second of a record-tying four consecutive home runs on July 2, 2022, the 11th such occurrence in major league history. At Citizens Bank Park in Philadelphia, Nolan Arenado, Gorman, Juan Yepez and Dylan Carlson all homered off Phillies starter Kyle Gibson with two outs in the first inning. It was the first time the Cardinals had accomplished the feat, and the first time that it occurred in the first inning. On September 19, the Cardinals optioned Gorman to Memphis. He remained there until the season's end, when he was added to the Cardinals' roster for the Wild Card Series. Over 89 games and 283 at-bats with St. Louis, he slashed .226/.300/.420 with 14 home runs, 35 RBIs, and 13 doubles.

Gorman started for the Cardinals on 2023 Opening Day as their designated hitter. On May 22, 2023, Gorman was named the National League Player of the Week after batting .458 with four home runs and 11 RBIs. Gorman appeared in 119 games for the Cardinals, batting .236 with 27 home runs and 76 RBIs. He missed time during the season due to back injuries.

Gorman opened the 2024 season as the Cardinals' starting second baseman. He was optioned to Memphis on August 21 after holding a MLB-worst 37.6% strikeout rate and spent the remainder of the season there. Over 107 games with St. Louis, Gorman hit .203 with 19 home runs and 50 RBIs.

Gorman opened the 2025 season with St. Louis before being placed on the injured list with a hamstring strain. In July, he was placed back on the injured list with back pain. Gorman rehabbed with Springfield before returning to St. Louis. Over 111 appearances with St. Louis, Gorman hit .205 with 14 home runs and 46 RBIs. He played 54 games at third base, 28 games at second base, 22 games as a designated hitter and seven games at first base.

In 2026, Gorman started the season as the third baseman for the Cardinals, taking the place of Nolan Arenado. He struggled to a .194/.279/.318 slash line with seven home runs and 74 strikeouts across 62 games and was optioned to Memphis on June 12. On August 25, Gorman was recalled by St. Louis, and played the remainder of the season with the team. He ended the 2026 season with a .184 batting average, nine home runs, and 33 RBI across 85 games with the Cardinals. On November 20, 2026, Gorman was non-tendered by the Cardinals and became a free agent.

== Personal life ==
Gorman has been friends with fellow 2018 first round pick and Cardinals teammate Matthew Liberatore since they were 5 years old. Gorman was the first player born in the year 2000 to be drafted by an MLB team.

Gorman and his wife, Madison, married on December 31, 2024, in Chandler, Arizona.
