= Kramer Robertson =

American baseball player (born 1994)

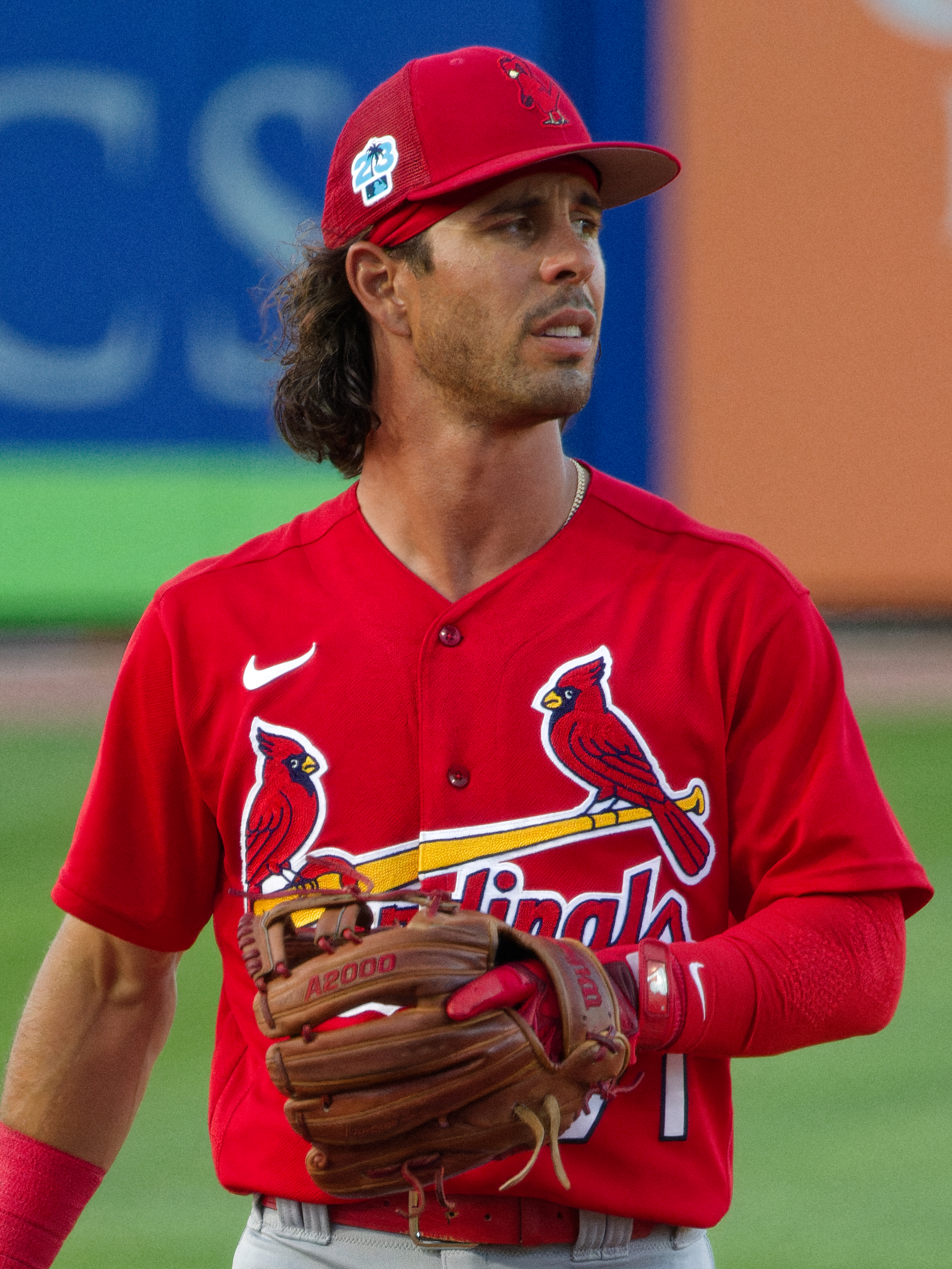
- Robertson with the St. Louis Cardinals in 2023
- Infielder
- Born: September 20, 1994 (age 31); Ruston, Louisiana, U.S.
- Batted: Right Threw: Right

MLB debut
- May 10, 2022, for the St. Louis Cardinals

Last MLB appearance
- May 11, 2022, for the St. Louis Cardinals

MLB statistics
- Batting average: .000
- Home runs: 0
- Runs batted in: 1
- Stats at Baseball Reference

Teams
- St. Louis Cardinals (2022)

Kramer Reid Robertson (born September 20, 1994) is an American former professional baseball infielder. He played in Major League Baseball (MLB) for the St. Louis Cardinals in 2022. Before his professional career, Robertson attended Louisiana State University (LSU) and played college baseball for the LSU Tigers.

== Early life ==
Robertson was born in Ruston, Louisiana. He moved to Waco, Texas in 2000. His mother, Kim Mulkey, played college basketball for Louisiana Tech University and the United States women's national basketball team and is the head coach for LSU's women's basketball team. His father, Randy, played college football for Louisiana Tech.

== Amateur career ==
Robertson attended Midway High School in Waco, Texas. He starred in baseball, football, and basketball at Midway. As a senior, he batted .425 with five home runs. After graduating, he enrolled at Louisiana State University (LSU), where he played college baseball for the LSU Tigers.

Robertson started 30 games at second base as a freshman, but batted .200 with one home run and 20 RBIs. He batted .232 as a sophomore. In 2014 and 2015, he played collegiate summer baseball with the Wareham Gatemen of the Cape Cod Baseball League, where he was named a league all-star in 2014. During his junior year, he moved to shortstop. He batted .324 with two home runs, 39 RBIs, 20 doubles, and 14 stolen bases as a junior in 2016, and was named to the All-Southeastern Conference team and Collegiate Baseball's All-American team. The Cleveland Indians selected Robertson in the 32nd round of the 2016 MLB draft, but he did not sign, turning down a $250,000 signing bonus so that he could return to LSU for his senior year. As a senior, he batted .307 with eight home runs, 43 RBIs, 18 doubles, and 85 runs scored.

== Professional career ==
=== St. Louis Cardinals ===
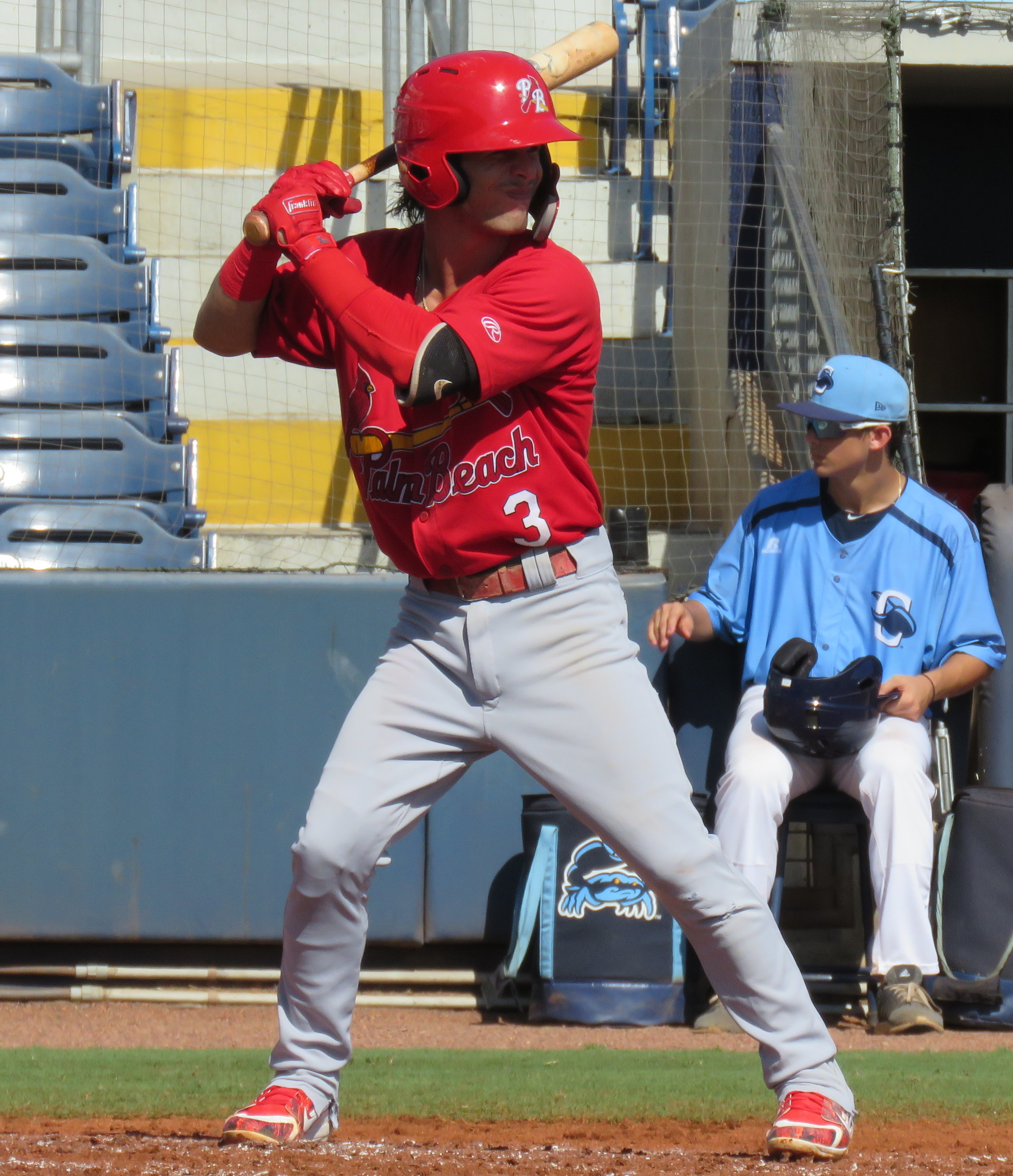
Robertson with the Palm Beach Cardinals in 2018

The St. Louis Cardinals selected Robertson in the fourth round of the 2017 MLB draft. He signed with the Cardinals, and made his professional debut for the Peoria Chiefs. He spent the whole season with Peoria, batting .270 with three home runs, 13 RBIs, and ten stolen bases in 54 games. Robertson spent 2018 with the Palm Beach Cardinals where he compiled a .252 batting average with two home runs, 37 RBIs, and 15 stolen bases in 121 games.

Robertson began the 2019 season with the Springfield Cardinals, and also spent time with the Memphis Redbirds. Over 123 games between the two clubs, he slashed .231/.360/.365 with 11 home runs, 51 RBI, and 14 stolen bases. He was selected to play in the Arizona Fall League for the Glendale Desert Dogs following the season. Robertson did not play in a minor league game in 2020 due to the cancellation of the season as a result of the COVID-19 pandemic. Robertson played for Memphis in 2021 and began the season with Memphis in 2022.

On May 10, 2022, the Cardinals promoted Robertson to the major leagues. He made his MLB debut that night as a pinch runner. In his second and final game in the majors that year he hit an RBI groundout. He was designated for assignment on June 3, following the promotion of Zack Thompson.

=== Atlanta Braves ===
On June 5, 2022, Robertson was claimed off of waivers by the Atlanta Braves. Robertson made 13 appearances for the Triple-A Gwinnett Stripers, batting .300/.397/.420 wi the one home run, six RBI, and four stolen bases.

=== New York Mets ===
The New York Mets claimed Robertson off of waivers from the Braves on June 27, 2022. He made 22 appearances for the Triple-A Syracuse Mets, hitting .240/.406/.307 with one home run, seven RBI, and four stolen bases. Robertson was designated for assignment by the Mets on August 3.

=== St. Louis Cardinals (second stint) ===
On August 5, 2022, the St. Louis Cardinals claimed Robertson off of waivers from the Mets. He was removed from the 40-man roster and sent outright to the Triple–A Memphis Redbirds on November 1.

Robertson spent the 2023 season with Triple–A Memphis, playing in 121 games and hitting .205/.356/.262 with three home runs, 37 RBI, and 23 stolen bases. On October 13, 2023, Robertson was released by the Cardinals organization.

== Post-playing career ==
In January 2025, Robertson joined Louisiana State University as the school's athletics performance analyst.

== Personal life ==
Robertson’s mother is Kim Mulkey, current head coach of the LSU women’s basketball team. He has an older sister, Makenzie, who played college basketball at Baylor.
