= Juan Yepez =

Venezuelan baseball player (born 1998)

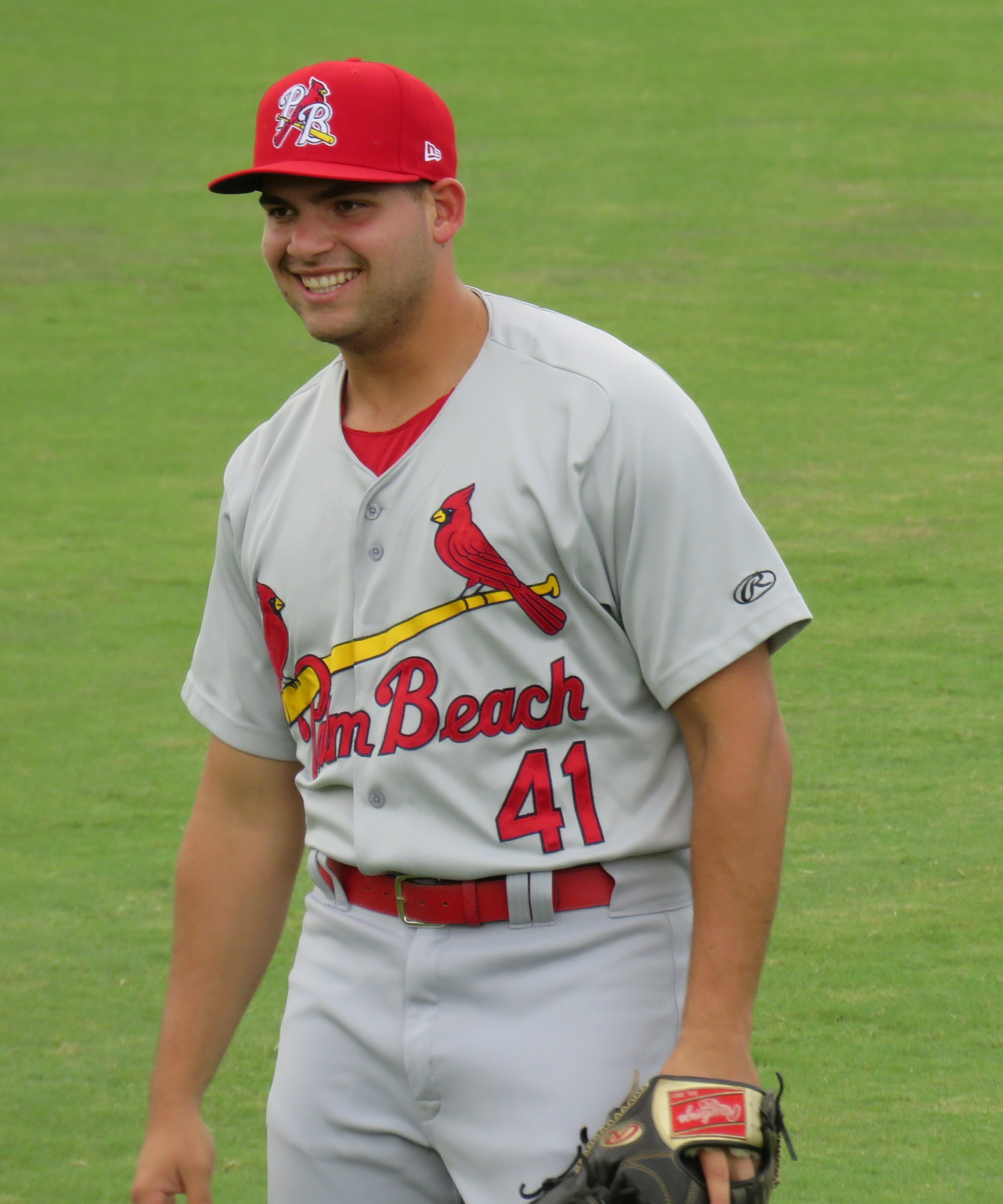
- Yepez with the Palm Beach Cardinals in 2019

Dorados de Chihuahua – No. 17
- Outfielder / First baseman
- Born: February 19, 1998 (age 28); Caracas, Venezuela
- Bats: Right Throws: Right

MLB debut
- May 4, 2022, for the St. Louis Cardinals

MLB statistics (through 2024 season)
- Batting average: .258
- Home runs: 20
- Runs batted in: 58
- Stats at Baseball Reference

Teams
- St. Louis Cardinals (2022–2023); Washington Nationals (2024)

Juan David Yepez (born February 19, 1998) is a Venezuelan professional baseball outfielder and first baseman for the Dorados de Chihuahua of the Mexican League. He has previously played in Major League Baseball (MLB) for the St. Louis Cardinals and Washington Nationals.

== Career ==
=== Atlanta Braves ===
Yepez signed with the Atlanta Braves as an international free agent in July 2014. The next year, he made his professional debut with the Rookie-level Gulf Coast League Braves before being promoted to the Danville Braves of the Rookie-level Appalachian League in August. Over 59 games between both clubs, he batted .299 with four home runs and 31 RBIs. In 2016, he was assigned to the Rome Braves of the Single–A South Atlantic League, but played in only 23 games due to injury. He returned to Rome to begin the 2017 season.

=== St. Louis Cardinals ===
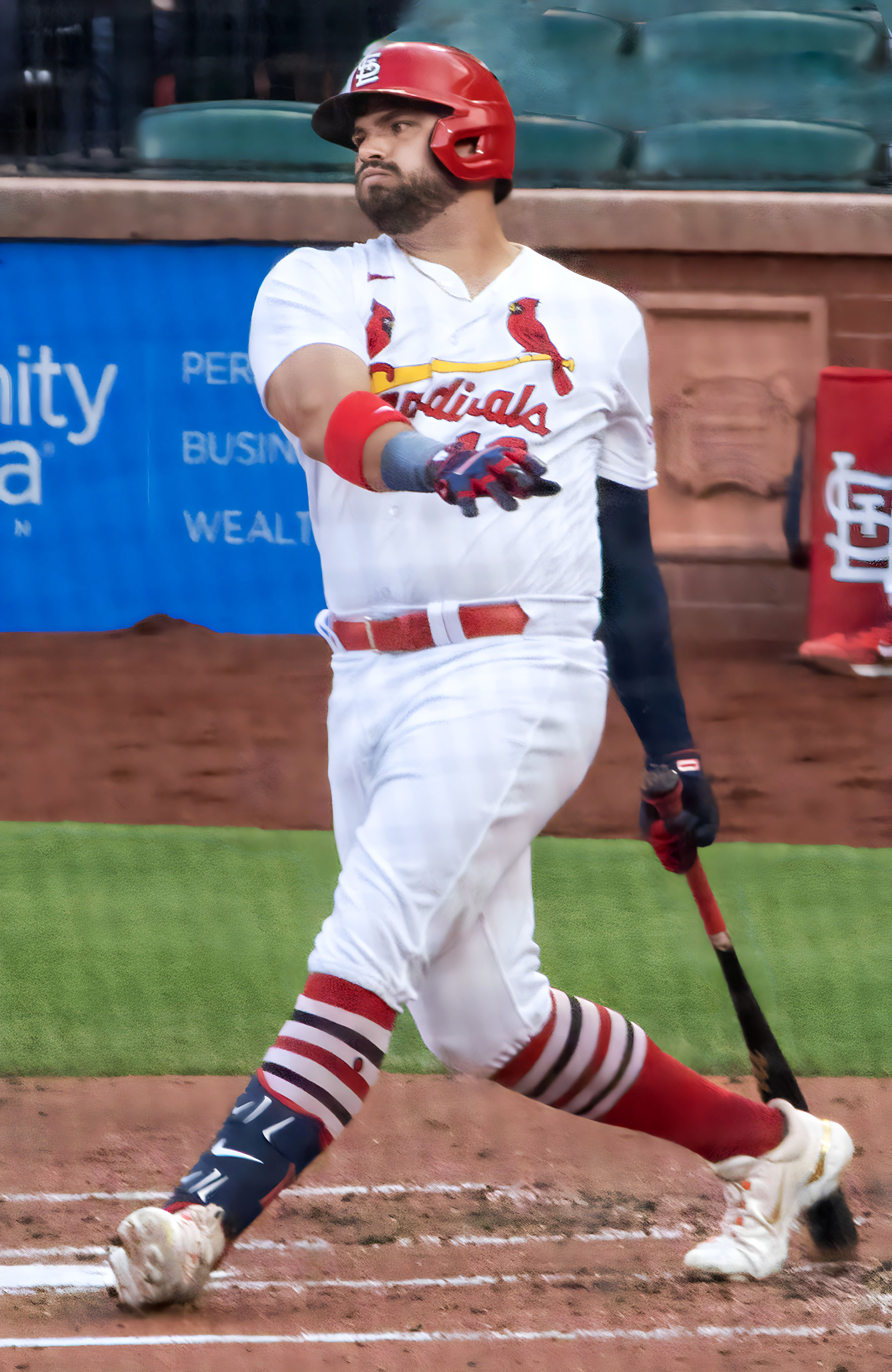
Yepez batting for the Cardinals in 2023

On May 20, 2017, Yepez was traded to the St. Louis Cardinals in exchange for Matt Adams. He was assigned to the Peoria Chiefs of the Single–A Midwest League, with whom he finished the year. Over 116 games between the two clubs, he slashed .265/.308/.388 with eight home runs and 62 RBIs. To begin the 2018 season, he was assigned to Peoria, and was promoted to the Palm Beach Cardinals of the High–A Florida State League in early May. Over 92 games, he hit .269 with three home runs and 42 RBIs. Yepez spent the 2019 season with Peoria, Palm Beach, and the Springfield Cardinals of the Double–A Texas League, batting .269 with ten home runs and 43 RBIs. Yepez did not play in a game in 2020 due to the cancellation of the minor league season because of the COVID-19 pandemic. He was assigned to Springfield to begin the 2021 season and was promoted to the Memphis Redbirds of the Triple-A East after 19 games. Over 111 games between the two teams, Yepez slashed .286/.383/.586 with 27 home runs, 77 RBIs, and 29 doubles. The Cardinals named him their Minor League Co-Player of the Year alongside Jordan Walker. He was selected to play in the Arizona Fall League (AFL) for the Glendale Desert Dogs after the season where he was named to the Fall Stars Game. He ended the AFL with a .302/.388/.640 slash line with 15 extra-base hits and was named the league's Hitter of the Year alongside J. J. Bleday.

On October 6, 2021, the Cardinals selected Yepez's contract and added him to the 26-man roster for the 2021 National League Wild Card Game, but he did not make an appearance. He returned to Memphis to begin the 2022 season.

The Cardinals recalled Yepez to the major league roster on May 3, 2022. Yepez made his major league debut the next day against the Kansas City Royals as the starting right fielder, and hit a double off Kris Bubic in his first at-bat. He recorded another double in his second at-bat, becoming the first player in Cardinals history to hit two doubles in their first game. He hit his first career home run off Jakob Junis against the San Francisco Giants on May 8, 2022. On June 27, he had his first career multi-home run night, hitting two two-run home runs versus the Miami Marlins.

Yepez hit the third of a record-tying four consecutive home runs between teammates on July 2, 2022, the 11th such occurrence in major league history. At Citizens Bank Park in Philadelphia, Nolan Arenado, Nolan Gorman, Yepez and Dylan Carlson all homered off Phillies starter Kyle Gibson with two outs in the first inning. It was the first time that the Cardinals had accomplished the feat, and the first time that it occurred in the first inning. In 76 games during his rookie campaign, Yepez hit .253/.296/.447 with 12 home runs and 30 RBI.

Yepez was optioned to Triple-A Memphis to begin the 2023 season. In 28 games, he batted .183/.246/.300 with two home runs and two RBI. On November 17, he was non-tendered by the Cardinals and became a free agent.

=== Washington Nationals ===
On December 6, 2023, Yepez signed a minor league contract with the Washington Nationals. In 74 games for the Triple-A Rochester Red Wings in 2024, he batted .263/.357/.438 with 11 home runs and 41 RBI. On July 5, the Nationals selected Yepez's contract, adding him to the major league roster. For the season he played in 62 games for the Nationals, batted .283, with six home runs and 26 RBI.

Yepez was optioned to Triple-A Rochester to begin the 2025 season, where he batted .199/.273/.301 with three home runs and 14 RBI across his first 45 appearances. Yepez was designated for assignment by the Nationals on June 16. He cleared waivers and was sent outright to Rochester on June 18. Yepez elected free agency following the season on November 6.

=== Dorados de Chihuahua ===
On February 11, 2026, Yepez signed a minor league contract with the Toronto Blue Jays. He was released by the Blue Jays prior to the start of the regular season on March 23.

On April 16, 2026, Yepez signed with the Long Island Ducks of the Atlantic League of Professional Baseball. However, prior to the start of the ALPB season on April 21, his contract was purchased by the Dorados de Chihuahua of the Mexican League.
