= Jake Walsh =

American baseball player (born 1995)

Free agent
- Pitcher
- Born: July 20, 1995 (age 31); Indialantic, Florida, U.S.
- Bats: Right Throws: Right

MLB debut
- May 11, 2022, for the St. Louis Cardinals

MLB statistics (through 2022 season)
- Win–loss record: 0–1
- Earned run average: 13.50
- Strikeouts: 5
- Stats at Baseball Reference

Teams
- St. Louis Cardinals (2022)

Jacob Dalton Walsh (born July 20, 1995) is an American professional baseball pitcher who is a free agent. He has previously played in Major League Baseball (MLB) for the St. Louis Cardinals.

== Amateur career ==
Walsh attended Melbourne High School, Jacksonville State University, Eastern Florida State College, and Florida Southern College. In 2017, as a junior at Florida Southern, Walsh started 16 games and went 12–1 with a 2.80 ERA over 99 2/3 innings. Following the season's end, he was selected by the St. Louis Cardinals in the 23rd round of the 2017 Major League Baseball draft.

== Professional career ==
=== St. Louis Cardinals ===
Walsh signed with St. Louis and made his professional debut with the Johnson City Cardinals of the Rookie-level Appalachian League, going 5–0 with a 0.95 ERA over 28 1/3 innings. He spent the 2018 season with the Peoria Chiefs of the Single–A Midwest League and the Palm Beach Cardinals of the High–A Florida State League, appearing in 25 games (24 starts) with both clubs in which he went 9–5 with a 2.51 ERA and 116 strikeouts. Walsh appeared in only two games in 2019 due to injury, and did not play a game in 2020 due to the cancellation of the minor league season because of the COVID-19 pandemic. In 2021, Walsh missed time due to injury, but still appeared in 17 games with the Springfield Cardinals of the Double-A Central and the Memphis Redbirds of the Triple-A East, going 2–2 with a 2.86 ERA and 34 strikeouts over 22 relief innings. He was selected to play in the Arizona Fall League for the Glendale Desert Dogs after the season.

On November 19, 2021, the Cardinals selected Walsh's contract and added him to their 40-man roster to protect him from the Rule 5 draft. He returned to Memphis to begin the 2022 season. On May 11, the Cardinals promoted Walsh to the major leagues. In three games during his rookie campaign, he struggled to a 13.50 ERA with 5 strikeouts in 2 2/3 innings of work.

Walsh was optioned to Triple-A Memphis to begin the 2023 season. In 27 games for Memphis, he worked to a 5.28 ERA with 34 strikeouts and 4 saves in 30 2/3 innings pitched. On July 23, Walsh was placed on the injured list with an unspecified nerve issue in his arm. Following Taylor Motter's promotion the same day, Walsh was released by the Cardinals.

=== Atlanta Braves ===
On February 2, 2024, Walsh signed a minor league contract with the Atlanta Braves. In 11 relief outings for the Triple–A Gwinnett Stripers, he recorded a 2.31 ERA with 8 strikeouts across 11 2/3 innings pitched. On June 1, Walsh was released by the Braves organization.

=== Ogden Raptors ===
On August 5, 2025, Walsh signed with the Ogden Raptors of the Pioneer League. In five appearances for Ogden, he recorded a 3.60 ERA with nine strikeouts over five innings of work. Walsh was released by the Raptors on August 22.
