= Ben DeLuzio =

Italian-American baseball player (born 1994)

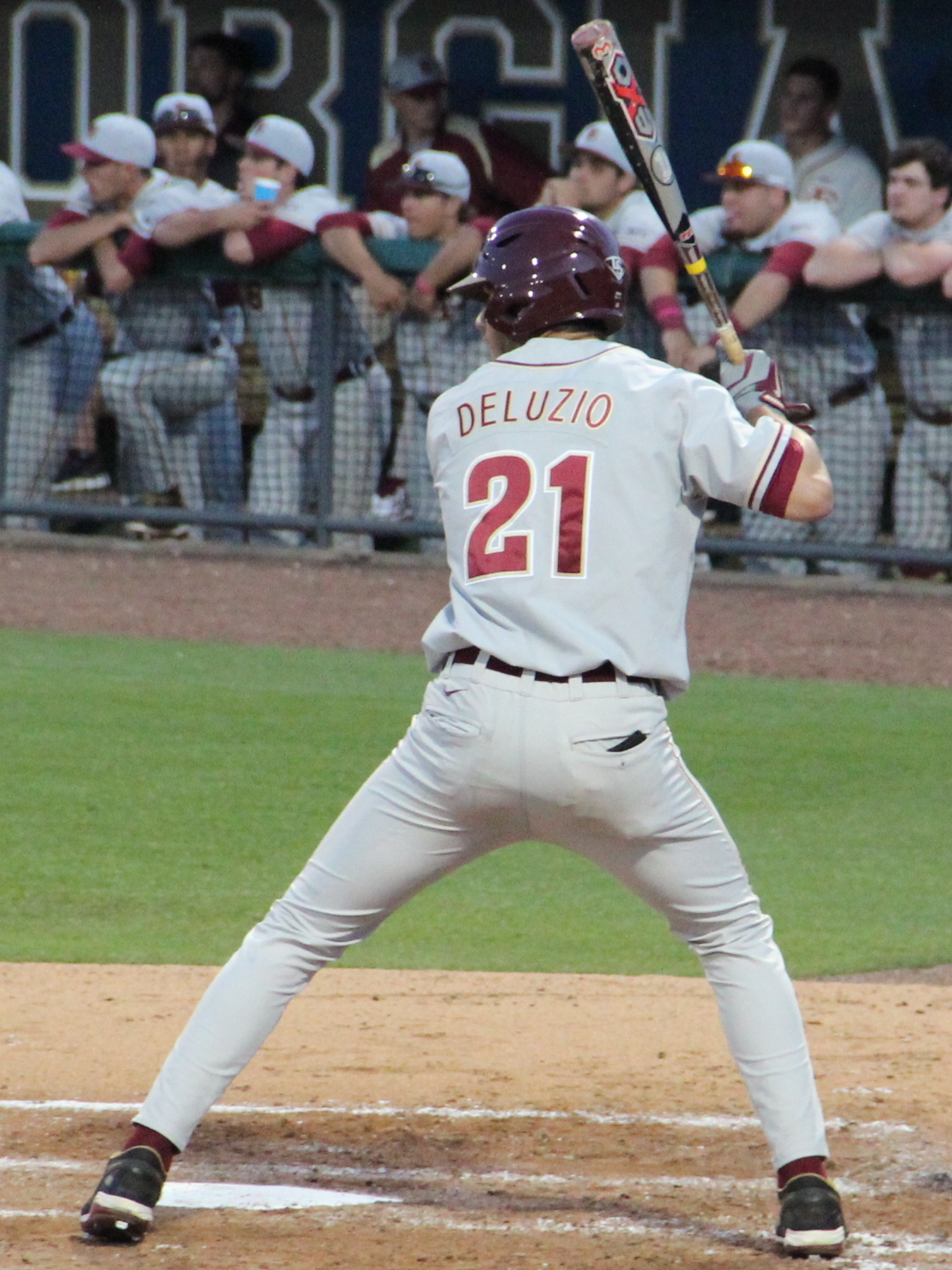
- DeLuzio with Florida State in 2014
- Outfielder
- Born: August 9, 1994 (age 31); St. Louis, Missouri, U.S.
- Batted: Right Threw: Right

MLB debut
- September 2, 2022, for the St. Louis Cardinals

Last MLB appearance
- October 5, 2022, for the St. Louis Cardinals

MLB statistics
- Batting average: .150
- Home runs: 0
- Runs batted in: 0
- Stats at Baseball Reference

Teams
- St. Louis Cardinals (2022)

Benjamin Amadeo DeLuzio (born August 9, 1994) is an American former professional baseball outfielder. He made his Major League Baseball (MLB) debut with the St. Louis Cardinals in 2022.

== Amateur career ==
DeLuzio was born in St. Louis, Missouri, but grew up in Orlando, Florida, where he attended The First Academy and played football and baseball. As a senior in 2013, he hit .424 with 21 RBIs. He was selected by the Miami Marlins in the third round of the 2013 Major League Baseball draft, but did not sign and instead enrolled at Florida State University to play college baseball for the Florida State Seminoles.

DeLuzio was a part of Florida State's starting lineup for all three seasons of his collegiate career. In both 2014 and 2015, he played in the Cape Cod Baseball League for the Hyannis Harbor Hawks.

== Professional career ==
=== Arizona Diamondbacks ===
DeLuzio went unselected in the 2016 Major League Baseball draft following his junior season and signed with the Arizona Diamondbacks as an undrafted free agent on July 17, 2016. He spent his first professional season split between the rookie–level Arizona League Diamondbacks and the Low–A Hillsboro Hops. In 34 games, he slashed .319/.415/.385 with 8 RBI and 14 stolen bases. In 2017, DeLuzio played in 76 games split between the Single–A Kane County Cougars and High–A Visalia Rawhide, batting .330/.373/.416 with 26 RBI and 25 stolen bases. He spent the 2018 season with the Double–A Jackson Generals, hitting .262/.336/.354 with 2 home runs, 14 RBI, and 34 stolen bases in 68 games.

In 2019, DeLuzio played in 118 games for Jackson and the Triple–A Reno Aces, hitting a cumulative .289/.374/.423 with career–highs in home runs (4) and RBI (43), as well as 18 stolen bases. DeLuzio did not play in a game in 2020 due to the cancellation of the minor league season because of the COVID-19 pandemic. He returned to action in 2021, playing in 68 contests between Reno and the Double–A Amarillo Sod Poodles. In aggregate, he hit .282/.343/.444 with 3 home runs, 25 RBI, and 16 stolen bases.

=== St. Louis Cardinals ===
On December 8, 2021, the St. Louis Cardinals selected DeLuzio in the minor league phase of the Rule 5 draft. The Cardinals assigned him to the Triple–A Memphis Redbirds to open the 2022 season. In 94 games for Memphis, he batted .278/.353/.429 with new career-highs in home runs (9) and RBI (39), as well as 30 stolen bases.

On September 1, 2022, the Cardinals selected DeLuzio's contract and promoted him to the major leagues. On September 8, DeLuzio collected his first career hit, a single off of Washington Nationals starter Josiah Gray. In 22 games for St. Louis in his rookie campaign, he went 3-for-25 (.150) with three walks. On November 18, DeLuzio was non–tendered by the Cardinals and became a free agent.

=== Los Angeles Dodgers ===
On December 13, 2022, DeLuzio signed a minor league deal with the Chicago Cubs. DeLuzio was released by the organization on March 29, 2023.

On March 30, 2023, DeLuzio signed a minor league contract with the Los Angeles Dodgers organization and was assigned to the Triple-A Oklahoma City Dodgers. In 25 games for Oklahoma City, he hit .180/.286/.258 with one home run and 15 RBI. DeLuzio was released by the Dodgers organization on May 16.

=== Baltimore Orioles ===
On May 23, 2023, DeLuzio signed a minor league contract with the Baltimore Orioles organization and was assigned to the Triple-A Norfolk Tides. In 18 games for Norfolk, DeLuzio hit .203/.266/.339 with two home runs and five RBI. He was released by the Orioles organization on July 11.

== International career ==
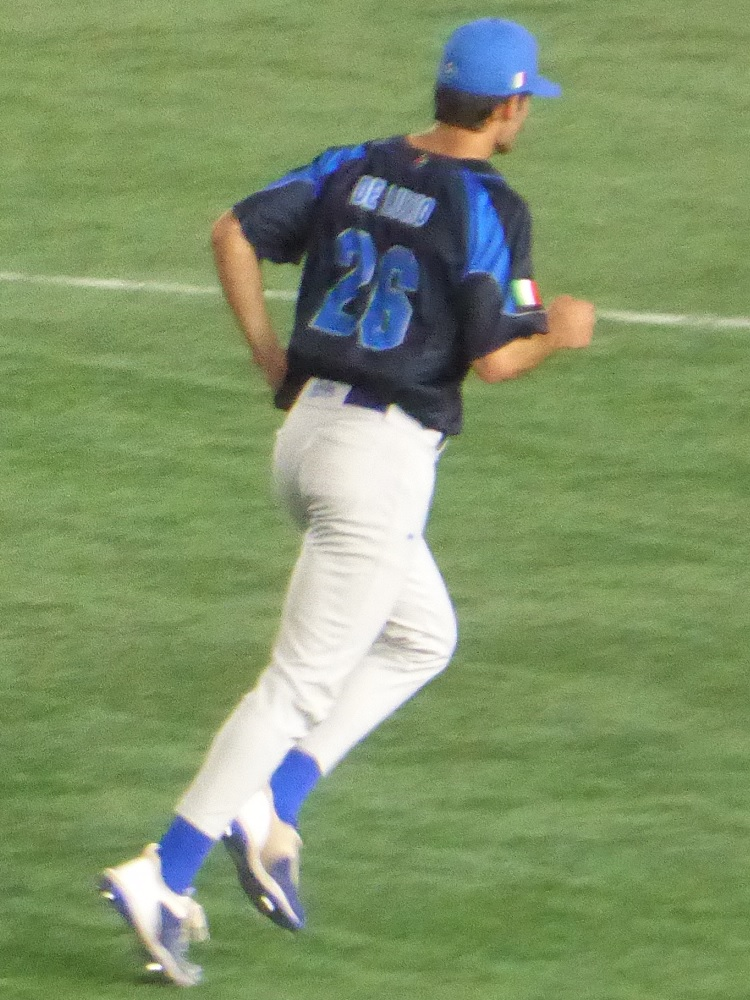
DeLuzio with the WBC Italy national team at Tokyo Dome on March 16, 2023

DeLuzio played for the Italy national baseball team at the 2023 World Baseball Classic.

== See also ==
- Rule 5 draft results
