= Andrew Knizner =

American baseball player (born 1995)

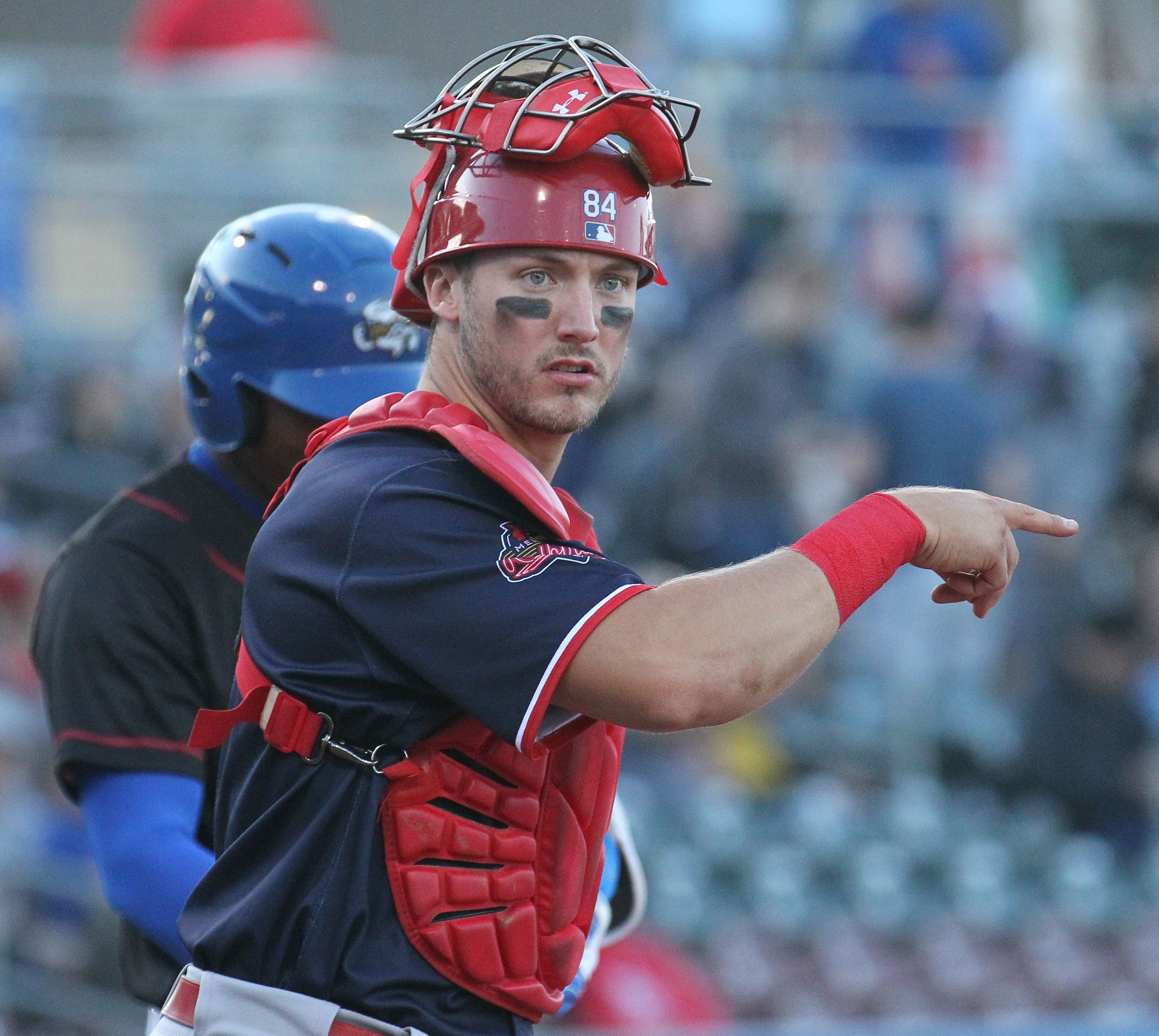
- Knizner with the Memphis Redbirds in 2019

Free agent
- Catcher
- Born: February 3, 1995 (age 31); Glen Allen, Virginia, U.S.
- Bats: Right Throws: Right

MLB debut
- June 2, 2019, for the St. Louis Cardinals

MLB statistics (through 2026 season)
- Batting average: .212
- Home runs: 21
- Runs batted in: 94
- Stats at Baseball Reference

Teams
- St. Louis Cardinals (2019–2023); Texas Rangers (2024); San Francisco Giants (2025–2026)

Andrew Robert Knizner (/ˈkɪznər/ KIZZ-nər; born February 3, 1995) is an American professional baseball catcher who is a free agent. He has previously played in Major League Baseball (MLB) for the St. Louis Cardinals, Texas Rangers, and San Francisco Giants.

== Amateur career ==
Knizner attended Hanover High School in Mechanicsville, Virginia. During his senior year, he captained the school's baseball team while batting .453 with five home runs, leading Hanover to a Class AAA state championship. After graduating, he attended North Carolina State University, where he played college baseball for the NC State Wolfpack. Knizner was named to the Louisville Slugger Freshman All-American team. Prior to his sophomore season, he switched from third base to catcher. In 2014 and 2015, he played collegiate summer baseball in the Cape Cod Baseball League for the Wareham Gatemen. As a junior, he batted .292 with six home runs and 30 runs batted in (RBI), along with a .991 fielding percentage and throwing out 16 of 37 base runners attempting to steal. After his junior year, Knizner was drafted by the St. Louis Cardinals in the seventh round of the 2016 Major League Baseball draft.

== Professional career ==
=== St. Louis Cardinals ===
Knizner signed with St. Louis and made his professional debut with the Johnson City Cardinals and posted a .319 batting average with six home runs and 42 RBI in 53 games. He was named to the Appalachian League postseason All-Star team. He started 2017 with the Peoria Chiefs and was the starting catcher in the Midwest League All-Star Game. In June, he was promoted to the Double-A Springfield Cardinals, skipping the High-A Palm Beach Cardinals.

Knizner finished 2017 with a combined .302 batting average with 12 home runs and 51 RBIs in 95 total games between the two clubs, including a .324 batting average in 51 games with Springfield. After the season, the Cardinals assigned Knizner to the Surprise Saguaros of the Arizona Fall League (AFL). He was named the AFL Hitter of the Week in the league's first week after tallying eight hits, two home runs, and five RBIs in 17 at-bats, and was selected to participate in the Fall Stars Game. Knizner finished the 2017 AFL batting .358 with three home runs, 12 RBIs, and a .940 OPS in 17 games. Knizner was a non-roster invitee to 2018 spring training.

Knizner began 2018 with Springfield and after batting .333/.412/.467 with two home runs and 18 RBIs in 27 games, he was promoted to the Memphis Redbirds. However, he returned to Springfield on June 9 in order to make room for Carson Kelly on the Memphis roster. In July, Knizner was selected to the 2018 All-Star Futures Game. In 94 games between Springfield and Memphis, Knizner slashed .313/.368/.430 with seven home runs and 45 RBIs.

Knizner returned to Memphis to begin 2019. On May 31, his contract was selected and he was called up to the major leagues for the first time. At the time of his call up, he was batting .286 with five home runs and 17 RBIs through 37 games with Memphis. He made his major league debut at Busch Stadium on June 2 versus the Chicago Cubs, going 0-for-3 as the Cardinals won 2–1. He was optioned back to Memphis on June 11 and recalled on July 11. He registered his first major league hit, a double, on July 17 against Chris Archer of the Pittsburgh Pirates as the Cardinals defeated Pittsburgh 6–5. On July 24, he hit his first major league home run, also against the Pittsburgh Pirates, leading St. Louis to a 14–8 win. Knizner finished the 2019 season in St. Louis batting .226 with two home runs and seven RBI over 53 at-bats. In the minors, he was a midseason All-Star and named the best Pacific Coast League defensive catcher by Baseball America.

In 2020, Knizner only received 17 at-bats across eight games for St. Louis, recording four hits and four RBIs. For the 2021 season, Knizner returned as Yadier Molina's backup, making 185 plate appearances over 63 games, slashing .174/.281/.236 with one home run, nine RBI, and seven doubles.

Knizner saw more playing time in 2022—293 plate appearances in 96 games—as Molina dealt with injuries for much of the season, and slashed .215/.301/.300 with four home runs and 25 RBIs.

On January 13, 2023, Knizner agreed to a one-year, $1.1 million contract with the Cardinals, avoiding salary arbitration. On May 6, it was announced that Knizner would take over as the primary catcher as the Cardinals began to shift Willson Contreras to designated hitter. However, the change was short-lived, and Contreras had returned to catching duties by May 15. Knizner appeared in 70 games for the Cardinals and batted .241 with ten home runs and 31 RBI. Knizner was non-tendered by the Cardinals on November 17.

=== Texas Rangers ===
On January 11, 2024, Knizner signed a one-year, major league contract with the Texas Rangers. In 35 games for the Rangers, he batted .167/.183/.211 with one home run and nine RBI. On August 6, Knizner was designated for assignment by Texas.

=== Arizona Diamondbacks ===
On August 8, 2024, Knizner was claimed off waivers by the Arizona Diamondbacks. In 20 games for the Triple-A Reno Aces, he slashed .274/.357/.397 with two home runs and 12 RBI. On September 14, Knizner was designated for assignment by the Diamondbacks. He cleared waivers and was sent outright to Reno on September 18. Knizner elected free agency on October 1.

=== Washington Nationals ===
On January 17, 2025, Knizner signed a minor league contract with the Washington Nationals. In 23 appearances for the Triple-A Rochester Red Wings, he slashed .382/.516/.500 with one home run and 11 RBI. Knizner was released by the Nationals organization on May 17.

=== San Francisco Giants ===
On May 21, 2025, Knizner signed a minor league contract with the San Francisco Giants. In eight games for the Triple-A Sacramento River Cats, he hit .367 with 10 RBI and six walks. On June 4, the Giants selected Knizner's contract, adding him to their active roster. In 33 games for San Francisco, he batted .221/.299/.299 with one home run and five RBI. On November 21, Knizner was designated for assignment by the Giants. He elected free agency the same day.

=== Colorado Rockies ===
On December 16, 2025, Knizner signed a one-year, $1 million contract with the Seattle Mariners. On March 25, 2026, the Mariners removed Knizner from their 40-man roster, after which he elected free agency.

On April 1, 2026, Knizner signed a minor league contract with the Colorado Rockies. He was subsequently assigned to the Triple-A Albuquerque Isotopes with whom he hit .279 with ten home runs across 33 games. On June 18, he was released by the Rockies.

=== Boston Red Sox ===
On June 23, 2026, Knizner signed a minor league contract with the Boston Red Sox. He made 21 appearances for the Triple–A Worcester Red Sox, batting .317/.426/.494 with two home runs, 19 RBI, and one stolen base. On August 8, Knizner was released by Boston after exercising the opt–out clause in his contract.

=== San Francisco Giants (second stint) ===
On August 11, 2026, Knizner signed a major league contract with the San Francisco Giants. Following the season, Knizner cleared waivers and elected free agency.

== Personal life ==
On December 20, 2024, Knizner married former Miami Dolphins cheerleader Ally Rahn in Jupiter, Florida.

Knizner's uncle was a quarterback for the Penn State Nittany Lions, serving as a backup on the 1986 team that won a college football national championship.
