= Ángel Rondón =

Dominican baseball player (born 1997)

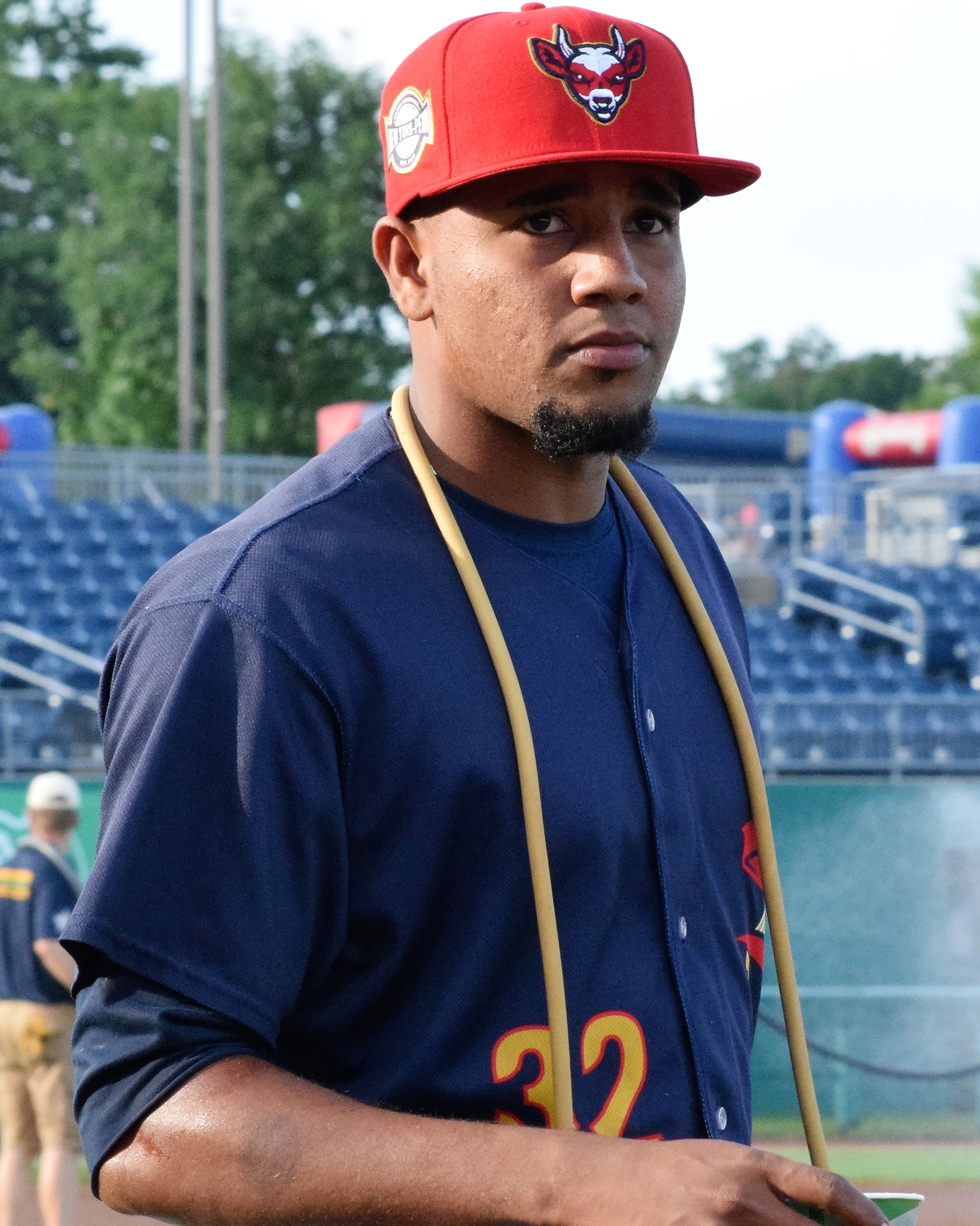
- Rondón with the State College Spikes in 2018

Free agent
- Pitcher
- Born: December 1, 1997 (age 28); Higüey, Dominican Republic
- Bats: Right Throws: Right

MLB debut
- June 6, 2021, for the St. Louis Cardinals

MLB statistics (through 2022 season)
- Win–loss record: 1–0
- Earned run average: 0.00
- Strikeouts: 5
- Stats at Baseball Reference

Teams
- St. Louis Cardinals (2021–2022)

Ángel Miguel Rondón (born December 1, 1997) is a Dominican professional baseball pitcher who is a free agent. He has previously played in Major League Baseball (MLB) for the St. Louis Cardinals.

== Professional career ==
=== St. Louis Cardinals ===
Rondón signed with the St. Louis Cardinals as an international free agent on January 6, 2016. He made his professional debut that year with the Rookie-level Dominican Summer League Cardinals, going 2–2 with a 2.79 ERA over 42 innings.

In 2017, he played with the Dominican League Cardinals, the Rookie-level Gulf Coast League Cardinals, and the Johnson City Cardinals of the Rookie-level Appalachian League, going a combined 3–4 with a 3.14 ERA over 14 games (11 starts) between the three clubs. He spent 2018 with the State College Spikes of the Low-A New York–Penn League and the Peoria Chiefs of the Single-A Midwest League, posting a 3–6 record and a 3.17 ERA over 15 starts with both teams, striking out 80 batters over 88 innings. He played in 2019 with the Palm Beach Cardinals of the High-A Florida State League (where he was named an All-Star) and the Springfield Cardinals of the Double-A Texas League, pitching to an 11–7 record, a 2.93 ERA, and 159 strikeouts over 160 innings and 28 starts with both clubs. Following the season, the Cardinals named Rondón their Minor League Pitcher of the Year.

Rondón did not play a minor league game in 2020 due to the cancellation of the minor league season caused by the COVID-19 pandemic. After the 2020 season, the Cardinals added him to their 40-man roster. To begin the 2021 season, he was assigned to the Memphis Redbirds of the Triple-A East League. On June 5, 2021, Rondón was promoted to the major leagues for the first time. He made his MLB debut the next day, pitching a scoreless inning of relief against the Cincinnati Reds. In the game, he also recorded his first major league strikeout, against Jonathan India. On July 8, 2022, the Cardinals designated him for assignment.

=== San Francisco Giants ===
On July 13, 2022, Rondón was claimed off waivers by the San Francisco Giants. He was designated for assignment on July 26. Rondón cleared waivers and was sent outright to the Triple-A Sacramento River Cats on August 2. He was released by the Giants organization on August 10.

On February 7, 2024, Rondón signed with the Dorados de Chihuahua of the Mexican League. However, he was released prior to the start of the season on April 10.

=== Rieleros de Aguascalientes ===
On April 16, 2026, Rondón signed with the Rieleros de Aguascalientes of the Mexican League. In 12 appearances, he posted a 2–0 record with a 6.75 ERA, eight strikeouts, and nine walks across 16 innings pitched. On May 19, 2026, Rondón was released by Aguascalientes.

=== Sultanes de Monterrey ===
On May 25, 2026, Rondón signed with the Sultanes de Monterrey of the Mexican League. In 12 appearances for the Sultanes, he posted an 0–1 record with a 7.98 ERA, 11 strikeouts, and three walks across 14 2/3 innings pitched. On July 6, Rondón was released by Monterrey.

=== El Águila de Veracruz ===
On July 11, 2026, Rondón signed with El Águila de Veracruz of the Mexican League. In 12 appearances, he registered a 0–3 record with a 3.97 ERA, 11 strikeouts, and six walks over 11 1/3 innings pitched. On September 23, 2026, Rondón was released by Veracruz.
