= Zack Thompson =

American baseball player (born 1997)

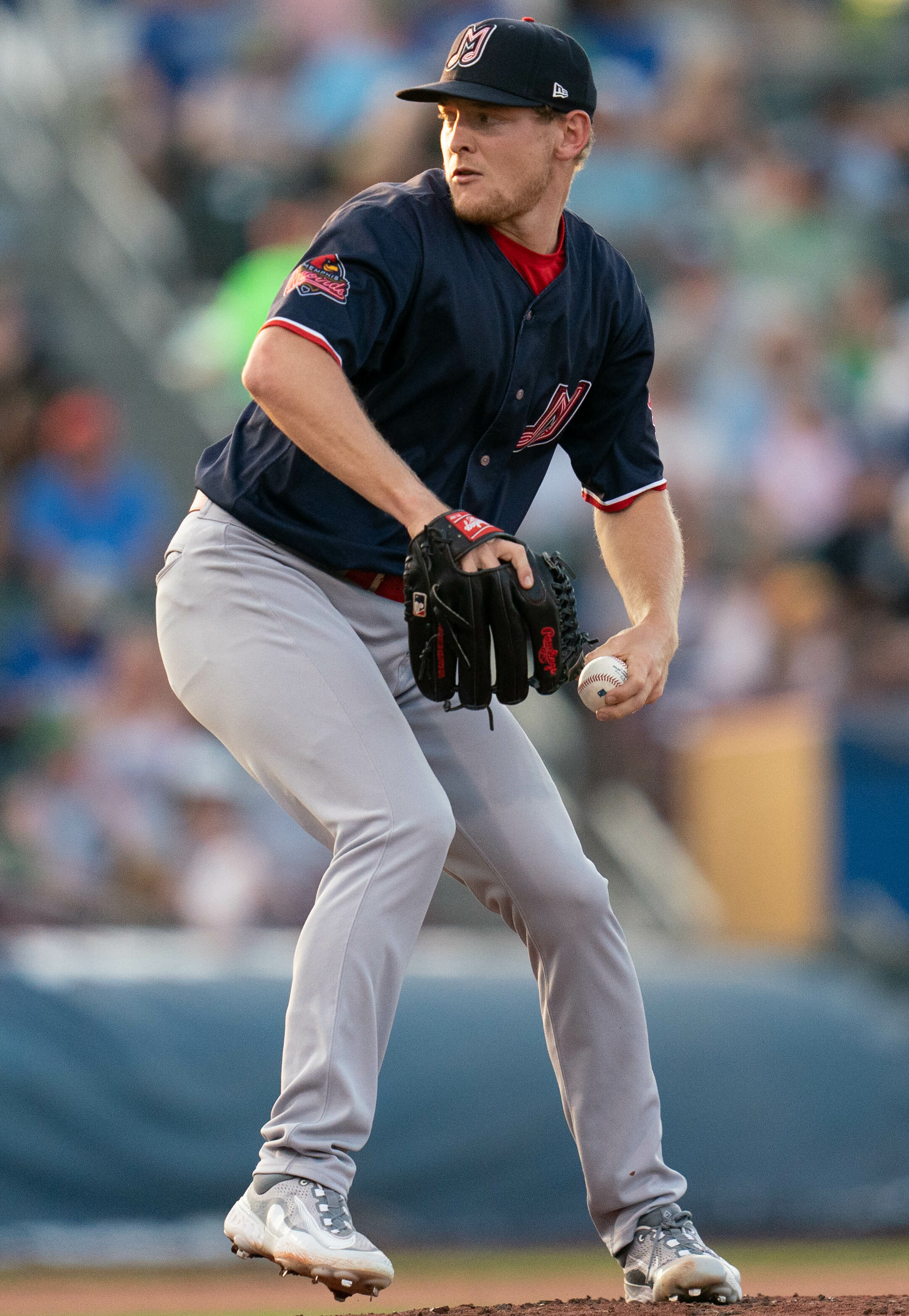
- Thompson with the Memphis Redbirds in 2023

Free agent
- Pitcher
- Born: October 28, 1997 (age 29); Selma, Indiana, U.S.
- Bats: Left Throws: Left

MLB debut
- June 3, 2022, for the St. Louis Cardinals

MLB statistics (through 2024 season)
- Win–loss record: 6–10
- Earned run average: 4.50
- Strikeouts: 119
- Stats at Baseball Reference

Teams
- St. Louis Cardinals (2022–2024)

Zachary David Thompson (born October 28, 1997) is an American professional baseball pitcher who is a free agent. He made his Major League Baseball (MLB) debut in 2022.

== Amateur career ==
Thompson attended Wapahani High School in Selma, Indiana. He pitched to a combined 19–0 record and 0.59 ERA as a sophomore and junior along with going 4–2 with a 1.88 ERA and striking out 119 batters in 56 innings as a senior. After his senior year, he was selected by the Tampa Bay Rays in the 11th round of the 2016 Major League Baseball draft. However, he did not sign and instead chose to enroll at the University of Kentucky to play college baseball for the Kentucky Wildcats.

In 2017, as a freshman at Kentucky, Thompson appeared in twenty games (13 starts) in which he went 8–3 with a 3.45 ERA. As a sophomore in 2018, Thompson missed nearly two months due to an elbow injury. He appeared in nine games, making seven starts, going 2–1 with a 4.94 ERA. That summer, Thompson played in the Cape Cod Baseball League for the Brewster Whitecaps and also played for the USA Baseball Collegiate National Team. Prior to the 2019 season, Thompson was named to the Preseason All-SEC First Team. He was named the SEC Pitcher of the Week on April 1 after throwing a complete-game shutout against the Georgia Bulldogs in which he struck out 13 batters while allowing only two hits. Thompson finished his junior year with a 6–1 record and a 2.40 ERA over 14 starts, striking out 130 batters in ninety innings, earning a spot on the All-SEC Second Team.

== Professional career ==
Thompson was considered one of the top prospects for the 2019 Major League Baseball draft. He was selected by the St. Louis Cardinals with the 19th overall pick. He signed for $3 million and made his professional debut with the Rookie-level Gulf Coast League Cardinals. After two relief appearances, he was promoted to the High-A Palm Beach Cardinals of the Florida State League, with whom he finished the year. Over 13 1/3 innings pitched with Palm Beach, Thompson compiled a 4.05 ERA, striking out 19.

Thompson did not play in a game in 2020 due to the cancellation of the minor league season because of the COVID-19 pandemic. Before the 2021 minor league season began, he participated in spring training with the major league club. Afterwards, Thompson was assigned to the Memphis Redbirds of the Triple-A East, appearing in 22 games (19 starts) in which he went 2–10 with a 7.06 ERA, 82 strikeouts, and 57 walks over 93 innings. Thompson was selected to play in the Arizona Fall League (AFL) for the Glendale Desert Dogs after the season where he was named to the Fall Stars Game. Over 17 1/3 innings pitched during the AFL, Thompson went 3–0 with a 1.56 ERA, 22 strikeouts, and 15 walks.

Thompson returned to Memphis to begin the 2022 season. After starting ten games and going 2–2 with a 4.67 ERA, the Cardinals selected his contract and promoted him to the major leagues on June 3. Thompson became the first Cardinals player to wear uniform number 57 since the death of Darryl Kile during the 2002 season. He made his MLB debut that day at Wrigley Field versus the Chicago Cubs, throwing four innings in relief, giving up one run, three hits, and one walk while striking out three batters and recording a save. In 22 appearances for St. Louis during his rookie campaign, Thompson compiled a 1–1 record and 2.08 ERA with 27 strikeouts and one save across 34 2/3 innings pitched.

Thompson made 25 appearances (nine starts) for the Cardinals in 2023, posting a 5–7 record and 4.48 ERA with 72 strikeouts across 66 1/3 innings pitched. He pitched in five games (two starts) for the club during the 2024 season, struggling to an 0–2 record and 9.53 ERA with 20 strikeouts over 17 innings of work.

Thompson suffered a tear in his lat muscle in spring training, and was transferred to the 60-day injured list on April 7, 2025. He did not appear for the organization during the season as a result of the injury. On November 6, Thompson was removed from the 40-man roster and elected free agency.

On January 26, 2026, Thompson re-signed with the Cardinals organization on a minor league contract. He did not make an appearance in 2026 due to a shoulder injury and an intercostal strain. He elected free agency on November 2.

== Personal life ==
Thompson grew up a fan of the Chicago Cubs.
