= Rainiel Rodríguez =

Dominican baseball player (born 2007)

- Rodríguez with the Leones del Escogido in 2026

St. Louis Cardinals
- Catcher / First baseman
- Born: January 4, 2007 (age 19); Pimentel, Dominican Republic
- Bats: Right Throws: Right
- Stats at Baseball Reference

Rainiel Rodríguez (born January 4, 2007) is a Dominican professional baseball catcher and first baseman in the St. Louis Cardinals organization. Signed as an international free agent in 2024 out of the Dominican Republic, he is the top prospect in the Cardinals system, and one of the top prospects in Major League Baseball.

== Career ==
Rodríguez was born on January 4, 2007, in Pimentel, Dominican Republic. He and his family moved to Philadelphia when he was ten years old, attended high school in the US, but moved back to the Dominican Republic at 16 before being signed. Before signing, he attended tryouts in the Dominican Republic, receiving offers from the Arizona Diamondbacks and the Colorado Rockies, but both were declined.

Rodríguez signed with the St. Louis Cardinals as an international free agent on April 1, 2024, for $300,000. He noted that he signed with the Cardinals due to his fondness for Albert Pujols, with the Cardinals liking him for his power hitting ability. He made his professional debut that year with the Dominican Summer League Cardinals. Rodríguez had a hot start in his first year, becoming one of two DSL Cardinals selected to play in the DSL All-Star Game on July 22. By the end of July, he was first in slugging percentage with .741 and on-base plus slugging (OPS) of 1.184 across the DSL. He ended the year with 42 games played, 10 home runs, 38 runs batted in (RBI), along with a slugging percentage of .683 and an OPS of 1.145, the highest recorded OPS by a DSL catcher since 2006.

Rodríguez started 2025 with the Florida Complex League Cardinals. He was named to the Minor League Baseball (MiLB) Prospect Team of the Week for May 12 to 18, recording four home runs in five games during that stretch. He would later be named the top Cardinals minor league players of the month for May alongside Tekoah Roby. He was promoted to the Single-A Palm Beach Cardinals on June 5, recording seven home runs and 16 RBI with the FCL Cardinals. Following his promotion to Palm Beach, he struggled with hitting initially, with his batting average hovering around .200 for the first weeks, only hitting two home runs in that stretch. Rodríguez ended up regaining his footing, being promoted to the High-A Peoria Chiefs in September and batting four runs in on his High-A debut on September 5. He ended his season with a .276 batting average, 20 home runs, and 63 RBI across 84 games in 2025. Baseball America ranked him as the third-ranked prospect in the Cardinals' system for their end of season rankings, predicting that he could be a top-ten prospect across all baseball within a year, along with MLB.com ranking him as the 55th overall prospect in the MLB.

Rodríguez started with the High-A Peoria Chiefs in 2026. He was promoted to the Double-A Springfield Cardinals on May 11, recording a .311 batting average with four home runs over 28 games in Peoria. Following his hot streak with Peoria, he was promoted to the 12th overall prospect in the MLB. He represented the Cardinals alongside Liam Doyle at the All-Star Futures Game on July 12.
