= Max Rajcic =

American baseball player (born 2001)

Free agent
- Pitcher
- Born: August 3, 2001 (age 25); Orange, California, U.S.
- Bats: Right Throws: Right

MLB debut
- June 18, 2026, for the St. Louis Cardinals

MLB statistics (through 2026 season)
- Win–loss record: 0–0
- Earned run average: 5.00
- Strikeouts: 8
- Stats at Baseball Reference

Teams
- St. Louis Cardinals (2026)
Medals
Men's baseball
Representing United States
18U Baseball World Cup
Silver medal – second place	2019 Gijang	Team

Maxwel Scott Rajcic (born August 3, 2001) is a free agent American professional baseball pitcher who is a free agent. He made his Major League Baseball (MLB) debut with the St. Louis Cardinals in 2026.

== Amateur career ==
Rajcic attended Lutheran High School of Orange County in Orange, California. As a junior in 2019, he had a 8–1 win–loss record with a 0.55 earned run average (ERA) and 78 strikeouts over 63 1/3 innings pitched. That summer, he played in the Under Armour All-America Baseball Game, the High School All-Star Game at Progressive Field, and for the 18U USA Baseball team. During his senior season in 2020, he gave up no runs and struck out 32 batters over 22 2/3 innings before the season was cancelled due to the COVID-19 pandemic.

Rajcic was considered a top prospect for the shortened 2020 Major League Baseball draft but went unselected and enrolled at the University of California, Los Angeles (UCLA) to play college baseball. As a freshman for the UCLA Bruins in 2021, Rajcic served as the Bruins' closer, going 2–1 with a 1.65 ERA and 36 strikeouts over 32 2/3 innings. Over the summer of 2021, he played collegiate summer baseball with the Orleans Firebirds of the Cape Cod Baseball League. As a sophomore in 2022, he moved into the starting rotation and went 8–5 with a 3.28 ERA and 92 strikeouts over 85 innings and 15 starts.

== Professional career ==
After the 2022 collegiate season, Rajcic was selected by the St. Louis Cardinals in the sixth round with the 187th overall pick in the 2022 Major League Baseball draft. He signed with the Cardinals for $600,000.

Rajcic made his professional debut in 2023 with the Palm Beach Cardinals of the Single-A Florida State League. In June, he was promoted to the Peoria Chiefs of the High-A Midwest League. In mid-September, he was promoted to the Springfield Cardinals of the Double-A Texas League. Over 23 starts between the three teams, Rajcic went 9–6 with a 2.48 ERA and 123 strikeouts over 123 1/3 innings. He was named the Florida State League Pitcher of the Year Award for his performance with Palm Beach. Rajcic returned to Springfield for the 2024 season. Over 24 starts, he posted a 10–11 record and 4.33 ERA with 131 strikeouts over 131 innings. Rajcic was assigned to Springfield to open the 2025 season and was promoted to the Memphis Redbirds of the Triple-A International League in July. He started a total of 27 games during the season and went 3–7 with a 4.96 ERA and 100 strikeouts over 118 innings.

Rajcic was assigned to Memphis to open the 2026 season and began pitching out of the bullpen. Across 40 2/3 innings with Memphis to begin the season, he had a 4–2 record, a 2.88 ERA and 46 strikeouts. On June 18, 2026, the Cardinals promoted Rajcic to the major leagues for the first time. He made his MLB that night in relief against the Kansas City Royals, pitching two innings in which he gave up one run, two hits, and recorded his first MLB strikeout against Tyler Tolbert. In six appearances for St. Louis, he recorded a 5.00 ERA with eight strikeouts over nine innings of work. On July 7, Rajcic was placed on the 60-day injured list due to an unspecified right elbow injury. On July 23, Rajcic announced that he had undergone Tommy John surgery, which ended his season prematurely. On November 19, the Cardinals designated him for assignment. The next day, Rajcic was non-tendered by the Cardinals, and became a free agent.
