= Bryan Dobzanski =

American baseball player (born 1995)

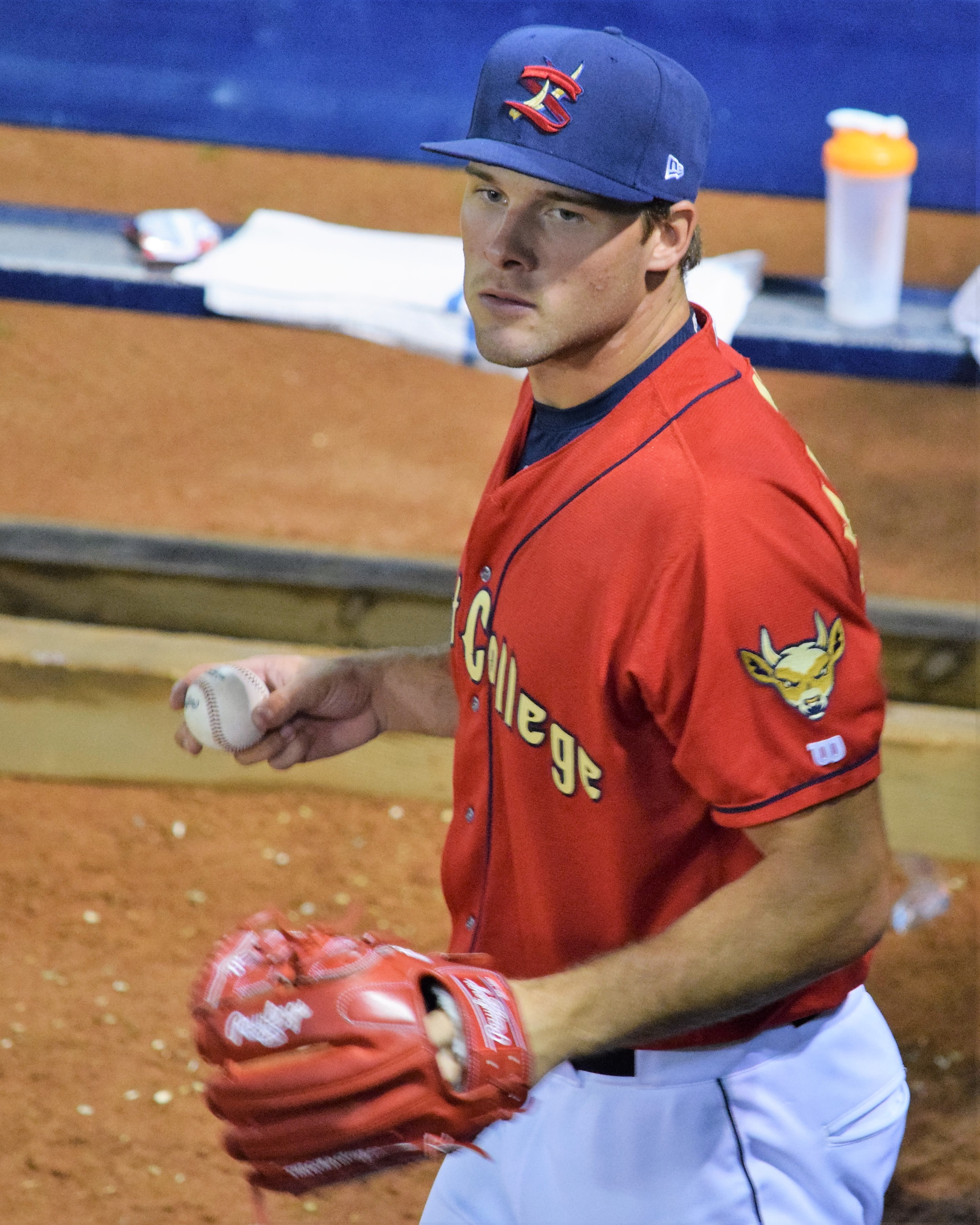
- Dobzanski with the State College Spikes in 2016

Free agent
- Pitcher
- Born: August 31, 1995 (age 31); Franklinville, New Jersey, U.S.
- Bats: Right Throws: Right

Bryan John Dobzanski (born August 31, 1995) is an American professional baseball pitcher who is a free agent.

== Amateur career ==
Dobzanski attended Delsea Regional High School in Franklinville, New Jersey, where he played baseball and wrestled. As a wrestler, he won two state titles and compiled a record of 155-8 for his high school career. In 2014, his senior year, he went 3–0 with a 0.91 ERA and 68 strikeouts over 46 innings.

== Professional career ==
=== St. Louis Cardinals ===
Dobzanski was selected by the St. Louis Cardinals in the 29th round, with the 885th pick, of the 2014 Major League Baseball draft. He signed with the Cardinals, forgoing his commitment to play college baseball at the University of Louisville. He made his professional debut that year with the Rookie-level Gulf Coast League Cardinals, going 2–1 with a 2.67 ERA over 27 innings. In 2015, he pitched for the Johnson City Cardinals of the Rookie-level Appalachian League, compiling a 1–1 record and a 3.94 ERA over 16 innings, and in 2016, he played with the State College Spikes of the Low–A New York–Penn League, going 4–6 with a 3.93 ERA over 14 games (13 starts), striking out 37 batters over 71 innings. In 2017, he spent the season with the Peoria Chiefs of the Single–A Midwest League, going 2–5 with a 3.70 ERA over 31 games (12 starts); he was moved from the starting rotation to the bullpen midway through the year.

Dobzanski began the 2018 season back with Peoria (with whom he was named an All-Star) before being promoted to the Palm Beach Cardinals of the High–A Florida State League in July. Over 42 relief appearances between the two clubs, he compiled an 8–4 record with a 2.41 ERA. In 2019, he split time with Palm Beach (earning Florida State League All-Star honors), the Springfield Cardinals of the Double–A Texas League, and the Memphis Redbirds of the Triple–A Pacific Coast League; over 57 relief innings pitched between the three teams, he went 3–3 with a 2.84 ERA and 66 strikeouts. Dobzanski did not play a minor league game in 2020 due to the cancellation of the minor league season caused by the COVID-19 pandemic. On November 2, 2020, he elected free agency.

=== Washington Nationals ===
On January 12, 2021, Dobzanski signed a minor league contract with the Washington Nationals organization. For the 2021 season, he was assigned to the Harrisburg Senators of the Double-A Northeast with whom he went 1–1 with a 3.47 ERA and 46 strikeouts over 46 2/3 innings. Dobzanski elected free agency following the season on November 7.
