= St. Louis Cardinals minor league players =

Below is a partial list of players in the St. Louis Cardinals minor league organization and rosters of their minor league affiliates. Players individually listed here have not yet played in Major League Baseball (MLB), but have reached an advanced level of achievement or notoriety (most minor league players do not meet these criteria). Some notable players in the minor leagues may have their own profile pages, such as first-round draft picks. Note that anyone with a past MLB appearance has their own profile page, even if they are currently playing in the minor leagues.

== Players ==
=== Jesús Báez ===
Jesús Báez

St. Louis Cardinals
- Infielder
- Born: February 26, 2005 (age 21); Santo Domingo, Dominican Republic
- Bats: Right Throws: Right

Jesús Manuel Báez (born February 26, 2005) is a Dominican professional baseball infielder in the St. Louis Cardinals organization.

Báez signed with the New York Mets as an international free agent in January 2022. He made his professional debut that season with the Dominican Summer League Mets.

Báez played 2023 with the Florida Complex League Mets and 2024 with the St. Lucie Mets and Brooklyn Cyclones. He opened the 2025 season with St. Lucie and was later assigned to Brooklyn.

On July 30, 2025, the Mets traded Báez, Nate Dohm, and Frank Elissalt to the St. Louis Cardinals in exchange for pitcher Ryan Helsley. The Cardinals assigned him to the Peoria Chiefs.

- Career statistics from Baseball Reference (Minors)

=== Ryan Campos ===
Ryan Campos

St. Louis Cardinals
- Catcher
- Born: October 16, 2002 (age 24); Mesa, Arizona, U.S.
- Bats: Right Throws: Right

Ryan William Campos (born October 16, 2002) is an American professional baseball catcher in the St. Louis Cardinals organization.

Campos attended Red Mountain High School in Mesa, Arizona, where he played baseball and hit .453 with 24 hits and 16 RBI in 18 games as a senior in 2021. After graduating, he played three years of college baseball at Arizona State University for the Arizona State Sun Devils. As a freshman at Arizona State in 2022, Campos started 43 games and batted .357 with two home runs and 30 RBI. In 2023, his sophomore season, he played 44 games and hit .388 with eight home runs and 24 RBI. In 2022 and 2023, he played collegiate summer baseball in the Cape Cod Baseball League with the Wareham Gatemen. As a junior in 2024, he played in 58 games and batted .364 with 11 home runs and 56 RBI.

Campos was selected by the St. Louis Cardinals in the fourth round of the 2024 Major League Baseball draft. He signed with the team and made his professional debut with the Low-A Palm Beach Cardinals with whom he batted .319 across 26 games. Campos played the 2025 season with the High-A Peoria Chiefs and hit .235 with three home runs, 47 RBI and 15 stolen bases over 95 games. He was assigned to the Double-A Springfield Cardinals for the 2026 season. Over 111 games, Campos batted .259 with 12 home runs and 60 RBI.

- Career statistics from Baseball Reference (Minors)
- Arizona State Sun Devils bio

=== Won-Bin Cho ===
Won-Bin Cho

St. Louis Cardinals
- Outfielder
- Born: August 20, 2003 (age 23); Seongnam, South Korea
- Bats: Left Throws: Left

Won-Bin Cho (born August 20, 2003) is a South Korean professional baseball outfielder in the St. Louis Cardinals organization.

Cho signed with the St. Louis Cardinals as an international free agent in January 2022. He signed with the Cardinals rather than pursue a career in the KBO League.

Cho made his professional debut that year with the Florida Complex League Cardinals. In 2023, he played with the Palm Beach Cardinals.

- Career statistics from Baseball Reference (Minors)

=== Brandon Clarke ===
Brandon Clarke

St. Louis Cardinals
- Pitcher
- Born: April 10, 2003 (age 23); Leesburg, Virginia, U.S.
- Bats: Left Throws: Left

Brandon Christopher Clarke (born April 10, 2003) is an American professional baseball pitcher in the St. Louis Cardinals organization.

Clarke attended Independence High School in Ashburn, Virginia. He underwent Tommy John surgery in 2020 during his junior year. He enrolled at the University of Alabama to play college baseball but did not appear in a game while dealing with thoracic issues. After his freshman year at Alabama, Clarke transferred to the State College of Florida, Manatee–Sarasota. He pitched sparingly for State College of Florida in 2023 due to a stress fracture in his right shoulder. He signed to transfer to Liberty University, but later rescinded his commitment. Clarke started 14 games for State College of Florida in 2024, going 6–2 with a 4.36 ERA and 107 strikeouts across 74 1/3 innings. In 2022 and 2023, he played collegiate summer baseball with the Bethesda Big Train of the Cal Ripken Baseball League.

Clarke was selected by the Boston Red Sox in the fifth round of the 2024 Major League Baseball draft. He signed with the Red Sox for $400,000. He made his professional in 2025 with the Single-A Salem Red Sox. After three starts, he was promoted to the High-A Greenville Drive. Over 14 starts between the two affiliates, Clarke went 0–3 with a 4.03 ERA, 60 strikeouts, and 27 walks over 38 innings pitched.

On November 25, 2025, the Red Sox traded Clarke, along with Richard Fitts and Patrick Galle, to the St. Louis Cardinals in exchange for Sonny Gray and cash considerations. He began the 2026 season on the 60-day injured list due to an aneurysm in his left arm. He returned to play in July and made one rehab start with the Rookie-level Florida Complex League Cardinals and three with the Single-A Palm Beach Cardinals. Following rehab, he was assigned to the High-A Peoria Chiefs.

- Career statistics from Baseball Reference (Minors)

=== Braden Davis ===
Braden Davis

St. Louis Cardinals
- Pitcher
- Born: April 9, 2003 (age 23); Arlington, Texas, U.S.
- Bats: Left Throws: Left

Braden Michael Davis (born April 9, 2003) is an American professional baseball pitcher in the St. Louis Cardinals organization.

Davis attended Keller High School in Keller, Texas, where he played baseball and earned All-State honors as a senior. He played two years of college baseball at Sam Houston State University. As a freshman in 2022, he pitched to a 1.62 ERA over 11 relief appearances. As a sophomore in 2023, he appeared in 24 games and went 5–4 with a 2.78 ERA over 45 1/3 innings. That summer, he played in the Cape Cod Baseball League with the Falmouth Commodores. He transferred to the University of Oklahoma for the 2024 season, going 9–4 with a 4.30 ERA and 117 strikeouts over 92 innings and 16 starts.

Davis was selected by the St. Louis Cardinals in the fifth round of the 2024 Major League Baseball draft and signed with the team. He made his professional debut in 2025 with the Single-A Palm Beach Cardinals and was promoted to the High-A Peoria Chiefs in July. Over 25 games (22 starts) between the two teams, Davis went 5–3 with a 2.85 ERA and 153 strikeouts over 110 1/3 innings. His 153 strikeouts were most in the Cardinals system and ninth-most across the minor leagues. Davis was assigned to the Double-A Springfield Cardinals for the 2026 season. He made 26 starts for the team and finished the season with a 3–6 record, a 5.15 ERA, and 140 strikeouts across 110 innings.

- Oklahoma Sooners bio
- Career statistics from Baseball Reference (Minors)

=== Nate Dohm ===
Nate Dohm

St. Louis Cardinals
- Pitcher
- Born: January 9, 2003 (age 23); Geneva, Illinois, U.S.
- Bats: Right Throws: Right

Nathaniel Steven Dohm (born January 9, 2003) is an American professional baseball pitcher in the St. Louis Cardinals organization.

Dohm attended Zionsville Community High School in Zionsville, Indiana, where he played baseball. After graduating, he enrolled at Ball State University where he played one season of college baseball, going 4–3 with a 5.71 ERA and 56 strikeouts over 51 innings. After the season, he transferred to Mississippi State University. As a sophomore for Mississippi State in 2023, he appeared in 17 games and went 6–4 with a 4.07 ERA. Dohm missed time as a junior in 2024 due to a forearm strain, but still appeared in eight games (six starts) in 2024, going 4–0 with a 1.23 ERA and 37 strikeouts. After the season, he was selected by the New York Mets in the third round of the 2024 Major League Baseball draft, and signed with the team for $797,500.

Dohm made his professional debut in 2025 with the St. Lucie Mets. In mid-May, he was promoted to the Brooklyn Cyclones.

On July 30, 2025, Dohm (alongside Jesus Baez and Frank Elissalt) was traded to the St. Louis Cardinals in exchange for Ryan Helsley. The Cardinals assigned him to the Peoria Chiefs. Over 23 games (22 starts) between St. Lucie, Brooklyn and Peoria, he went 3–7 with a 3.24 ERA and 90 strikeouts over 75 innings. Dohm returned to Peoria to start the 2026 season and was promoted to the Springfield Cardinals in August. Across 25 games (13 starts), he went 2–7 with a 7.19 ERA and 67 strikeouts over 61 1/3 innings. After the season, he was assigned to play in the Arizona Fall League with the Peoria Javelinas.

- Career statistics from Baseball Reference (Minors)
- Mississippi State Bulldogs bio

=== Daniel Eagen ===
Daniel Eagen

St. Louis Cardinals
- Pitcher
- Born: November 23, 2002 (age 23); Fuquay-Varina, North Carolina, U.S.
- Bats: Right Throws: Right

Daniel James Eagen (born November 23, 2002) is an American professional baseball pitcher in the St. Louis Cardinals organization.

Eagen attended Fuquay-Varina High School in Fuquay-Varina, North Carolina and played college baseball at Presbyterian College in Clinton, South Carolina. As a junior at Presbyterian in 2024, he started 14 games and went 6–2 with a 2.67 ERA and 121 strikeouts over 77 2/3 innings. After his junior year, he was selected by the Arizona Diamondbacks in the third round of the 2024 Major League Baseball draft. He signed for $650,000.

Eagen was assigned to Arizona's Spring Breakout roster during 2025 spring training. After spring training, he was assigned to the High-A Hillsboro Hops to make his professional debut. Over 19 starts with the Hops, Eagen went 7–5 with a 2.49 ERA and 132 strikeouts over 97 2/3 innings. In mid-August, he was promoted to the Double-A Amarillo Sod Poodles. Over four starts with Amarillo to end the season, he went 0–3 with a 5.49 ERA over 19 2/3 innings. After the season, Eagen was named the Northwest League Pitcher of the Year for his performance with Hillsboro. The Diamondbacks also named him their Minor League Pitcher of the Year. Eagen returned to Amarillo to open the 2026 season.

On August 3, 2026, the Diamondbacks traded Eagen, Sandro Santana, and a player to be named later to the St. Louis Cardinals in exchange for Lars Nootbaar. He was assigned the Double-A Springfield Cardinals. Across 26 starts in 2026 with Amarillo and Springfield, Eagen went 8–11 with a 4.72 ERA and 157 strikeouts over 122 innings. His 157 strikeouts were fifth most in the minor leagues.

- Career statistics from Baseball Reference (Minors)
- Presbyterian Blue Hose bio

=== Yhoiker Fajardo ===
Yhoiker Fajardo

St. Louis Cardinals
- Pitcher
- Born: September 27, 2001 (age 25); Villa de Cura, Venezuela
- Bats: Right Throws: Right

Yhoiker Raul Fajardo (born October 3, 2006) is a Venezuelan professional baseball pitcher in the St. Louis Cardinals organization.

Fajardo signed with the Chicago White Sox as an international free agent in February 2024. He made his professional debut that year with the Dominican Summer League White Sox.

On December 21, 2024, the White sox traded Fajardo to the Boston Red Sox for Cam Booser. He pitched that season with the Florida Complex League Red Sox and Salem Red Sox. On December 22, 2025, the Red Sox traded Fajardo along Hunter Dobbins, and Blake Aita to the St. Louis Cardinals for Willson Contreras.

Fajardo started the 2026 season with the Peoria Chiefs.

- Career statistics from Baseball Reference (Minors)

=== Alexander Frias ===
Alexander Frias

St. Louis Cardinals
- Outfielder
- Born: March 10, 2008 (age 18); Río San Juan, Dominican Republic
- Bats: Left Throws: Right

Alexander Frias (born March 10, 2008) is a Dominican professional baseball outfielder in the St. Louis Cardinals organization.

Frias signed with the Milwaukee Brewers as an international free agent in January 2025. He made his professional debut that year with the Dominican Summer League Brewers, batting .316/.411/.400 with one home run and 17 RBI. Frias began the 2026 campaign with the Arizona Complex League Brewers and was promoted to the Wilson Warbirds in June.

On August 3, 2026, the Brewers traded Frias and Josiah Ragsdale to the St. Louis Cardinals in exchange for Dustin May and JoJo Romero.

- Career statistics from Baseball Reference (Minors)

=== Jack Gurevitch ===
Jack Gurevitch

St. Louis Cardinals
- First baseman / Third baseman
- Born: May 9, 2004 (age 22); Santa Monica, California, U.S.
- Bats: Left Throws: Right

Jack Henry Gurevitch (born March 9, 2004) is an American professional baseball first baseman and third baseman in the St. Louis Cardinals organization.

Gurevitch attended Notre Dame High School in Sherman Oaks, California and played college baseball at the University of San Diego (USD). In 2024, he played collegiate summer baseball with the Orleans Firebirds of the Cape Cod Baseball League. As a junior at USD in 2025, he started 56 games and hit .371 with 17 home runs and 56 RBI. After the season, he was selected by the St. Louis Cardinals in the third round of the 2025 Major League Baseball draft.

Gurevtich made his professional debut with the Single-A Palm Beach Cardinals and hit .181 with one home run across 22 games. He returned to Palm Beach to open the 2026 season and was named the Cardinals Minor League Player of the Month for April. In May, Gurevitch was promoted to the High-A Peoria Chiefs. In August, he was promoted once again, to the Double-A Springfield Cardinals. Across 119 games between the three teams, Gurevitch had a .283/.360/.542 slash line with 32 home runs and 96 RBI.

- San Diego Toreros bio
- Career statistics from Baseball Reference (Minors)

=== Skylar Hales ===
Skylar Hales

St. Louis Cardinals
- Pitcher
- Born: October 24, 2001 (age 25); Reno, Nevada, U.S.
- Bats: Right Throws: Right

Skylar Dhiraj Hales (born October 24, 2001) is an American professional baseball pitcher in the St. Louis Cardinals organization.

Hales attended Reno High School in Reno, Nevada. Undrafted out of high school, he attended Santa Clara University to play college baseball for the Broncos. He enjoyed his best collegiate season as a junior in 2023, going 6–5 with a 3.42 ERA and 69 strikeouts over 55 1/3 innings. Hales participated in the 2023 MLB Draft Combine. He was selected by the Texas Rangers in the fourth round of the 2023 MLB draft and signed with them for a $565,000 signing bonus.

Hales split his debut professional season of 2023 between the ACL Rangers of the Rookie-level Arizona Complex League and the Down East Wood Ducks of the Low-A Carolina League, going a combined 0–1 with a 4.22 ERA and 11 strikeouts over 10 2/3 innings. He opened the 2024 season with the Hickory Crawdads of the High-A South Atlantic League, going 1–0 with a 4.39 ERA and 35 strikeouts over 26 2/3 innings. He was promoted in June to the Frisco RoughRiders of the Double-A Texas League. Over 24 relief appearances with Friso, Hales went 3–0 with a 2.10 ERA. He opened the 2025 season with Frisco and was promoted to the Round Rock Express of the Triple-A Pacific Coast League in June.

On July 31, 2025, the Rangers traded Hales, Mason Molina and international bonus pool money to the St. Louis Cardinals in exchange for Phil Maton.

- Career statistics from MLB · Baseball Reference (Minors)
- Santa Clara Broncos bio

=== Ixan Henderson ===
Ixan Henderson

St. Louis Cardinals
- Pitcher
- Born: January 29, 2002 (age 24); Fresno, California, U.S.
- Bats: Left Throws: Left

Philip "Ixan" Henderson (born January 29, 2002) is an American professional baseball pitcher in the St. Louis Cardinals organization.

Henderson attended Clovis West High School in Fresno, California and played college baseball at California State University, Fresno. He was selected by the St. Louis Cardinals in the eighth round of the 2023 Major League Baseball draft.

Henderson made his professional debut in 2023 with the Palm Beach Cardinals. He pitched 2024 with Palm Beach and the Peoria Chiefs and pitched in the Arizona Fall League after the season. Henderson played the 2025 season with the Springfield Cardinals. He was named the Texas League Pitcher of the Year.

- Career statistics from Baseball Reference (Minors)

=== Joseph King ===
Joseph King

St. Louis Cardinals
- Pitcher
- Born: February 23, 2001 (age 25); Redwood City, California, U.S.
- Bats: Right Throws: Right

Joseph Daniel King (born February 23, 2001) is an American professional baseball pitcher in the St. Louis Cardinals organization.

King graduated from Woodside High School in Woodside, California, in 2019. That year, he was named the baseball player of the year in the Peninsula Athletic League's Ocean Division. He attended the University of California, Berkeley and played college baseball for the California Golden Bears. The St. Louis Cardinals selected him in the ninth round of the 2022 MLB draft. He signed with the Cardinals and reported to extended spring training. He pitched for the Great Britain national baseball team in the 2023 World Baseball Classic.

- Career statistics from Baseball Reference (Minors)

=== Zach Levenson ===
Zach Levenson

St. Louis Cardinals
- Outfielder
- Born: March 6, 2002 (age 24); Orlando, Florida, U.S.
- Bats: Right Throws: Right

Zachary Levenson (born March 6, 2002) is an American professional baseball outfielder in the St. Louis Cardinals organization.

Levenson played college baseball at the University of Miami. In 2022 he batted .300/.420/.531 in 130 at bats playing right field for the Hurricanes. In the summer of 2022 he played for Wausau in the Northwoods League and batted .306/.457/.481 in 108 at bats. In 2023 he batted .292/.397/.554 in 233 at bats playing primarily right field for the Hurricanes. He was selected by the St. Louis Cardinals in the fifth round of the 2023 Major League Baseball draft.

In 2023, he played for the Palm Beach Cardinals and batted .268/.331/.480 in 123 at bats playing primarily left field. In 2024 he played for the Peoria Chiefs, and batted .215/.317/.367 in 251 at bats playing primarily left field. In 2025 he played for the Springfield Cardinals and Peoria, and batted .245/.367/.403 with 12 home runs and 57 RBIs in 375 at bats playing all three outfield positions.

Levenson was selected to play for the Israel national baseball team at the 2026 World Baseball Classic.

- Career statistics from Baseball Reference (Minors)

=== Chen-Wei Lin ===
Chen-Wei Lin

St. Louis Cardinals
- Pitcher
- Born: November 22, 2001 (age 24); Tainan, Taiwan
- Bats: Right Throws: Right

Chen-Wei Lin (born November 22, 2001) is a Taiwanese professional baseball pitcher in the St. Louis Cardinals organization.

Lin played college baseball at Chinese Culture University in Taiwan, and played collegiate summer baseball for the Kenosha Kingfish of the Northwoods League and the Frederick Keys of the MLB Draft League. He also played in the Chinese Professional Baseball League with the Fubon Guardians. Lin signed with the St. Louis Cardinals as an international free agent in July 2023.

Lin made his professional debut in 2023 with the Rookie-level Florida Complex League Cardinals and also played with the Single-A Palm Beach Cardinals. Across six starts with both teams, he had a 0–3 record with a 6.06 ERA. In 2024, he played the entirety of the season with Palm Beach with whom he started 22 games and went 10–5 with a 2.79 ERA and 123 strikeouts across 116 innings. He was named the Cardinals Minor League Pitcher of the Month for August. Lin played the 2025 season with Palm Beach, the High-A Peoria Chiefs and the Double-A Springfield Cardinals and had a 0–2 record and a 5.54 ERA over 17 starts between the three teams, although he missed time during the year due to injury. After the season, he played in the Arizona Fall League with the Glendale Desert Dogs. He returned to Springfield for the 2026 season. Lin appeared in 26 games for Springfield and went 6–6 with a 5.00 ERA and 118 strikeouts over 102 2/3 innings.

Lin's uncle, Hong-Chih Kuo, played in MLB for the Los Angeles Dodgers.

- Career statistics from Baseball Reference (Minors)

=== Noah Mendlinger ===
Noah Mendlinger

St. Louis Cardinals
- Utility player
- Born: August 9, 2000 (age 26); Atlanta, Georgia, U.S.
- Bats: Left Throws: Right

Noah Mendlinger (born August 9, 2000) is an American professional baseball utility player in the St. Louis Cardinals organization.

Mendlinger played college baseball for the Georgia College Bobcats from 2019 to 2021.

In July 2021, Mendlinger signed with the St. Louis Cardinals as an undrafted free agent.

On May 30, 2023, while playing for the Springfield Cardinals, he was named the Texas League Player of the Week.

He has Jewish heritage on his father's side, and represented the Israel national baseball team in the 2023 World Baseball Classic and 2026 World Baseball Classic.

- Career statistics from Baseball Reference (Minors)

=== Mason Molina ===
Mason Molina

St. Louis Cardinals
- Pitcher
- Born: July 8, 2003 (age 23); Irvine, California, U.S.
- Bats: Right Throws: Left

Mason Joseph Molina (born July 8, 2003) is an American professional baseball pitcher in the St. Louis Cardinals organization.

Molina attended Trabuco Hills High School in Mission Viejo, California and played college baseball at Texas Tech University for two years and the University of Arkansas for a year. He was selected by the Milwaukee Brewers in the seventh round of the 2024 Major League Baseball draft.

Molina made his professional debut with the Carolina Mudcats. On January 2, 2025, the Brewers traded Molina to the Texas Rangers for Grant Anderson. He opened the 2025 season with the Hickory Crawdads and was promoted to the Hub City Spartanburgers during the season.

On July 31, 2025, the Rangers traded Molina, Skylar Hales and international bonus pool money to the St. Louis Cardinals for Phil Maton. He started his Cardinals career with the Peoria Chiefs. Molina opened the 2026 season with the Springfield Cardinals.

- Career statistics from Baseball Reference (Minors)

=== Jacob Odle ===
Jacob Odle

St. Louis Cardinals
- Pitcher
- Born: November 30, 2003 (age 22); San Diego, California, U.S.
- Bats: Right Throws: Right

Jacob Edgar Odle (born November 30, 2003) is an American professional baseball pitcher in the St. Louis Cardinals organization.

Odle attended St. Augustine High School in San Diego. He enrolled at the University of California, Irvine, redshirted his freshman year in 2022, and did not appear in a game. He then transferred to Orange Coast College for the 2023 season where he pitched 14 1/3 innings. After the 2023 season, he played in the MLB Draft League with the State College Spikes and had a 2.03 ERA with 29 strikeouts across 13 1/3 innings.

Odle was selected by the St. Louis Cardinals in the 14th round with the 425th overall pick in the 2023 Major League Baseball draft. He signed with the team for $150,000. Odle made his professional debut after signing with the rookie-level Florida Complex League Cardinals, appearing in two games. He missed the 2024 season after undergoing Tommy John surgery. Odle returned to play in 2025 and pitched 8 2/3 innings with the Florida Complex League Cardinals before he was assigned to the Single-A Palm Beach Cardinals. Across 13 starts with Palm Beach, he had a 0–5 record, a 6.28 ERA, 35 walks, and 54 strikeouts over 43 innings.

Odle was assigned back to Palm Beach to open the 2026 season. In late May, he was promoted to the High-A Peoria Chiefs. Odle pitched in 24 games (22 starts) with the two teams and had a 5–7 record, a 3.19 ERA, and 143 strikeouts over 96 innings pitched. After the season, the Cardinals added him to their 40-man roster to protect him from the Rule 5 draft.

- Career statistics from Baseball Reference (Minors)
- Orange Coast College bio

=== Deniel Ortiz ===
Deniel Ortiz

St. Louis Cardinals
- Third baseman / First baseman
- Born: August 24, 2004 (age 22); Caguas, Puerto Rico
- Bats: Right Throws: Right

Deniel Oneil Ortiz (born August 24, 2004) is a Puerto Rican professional baseball third baseman and first baseman in the St. Louis Cardinals organization.

Born in Caguas, Puerto Rico, Ortiz moved to Lynn, Massachusetts when he was 12 and attended Lynn Classical High School and St. Mary's High School. He attended Redan High School in Redan, Georgia, as a senior in 2022 and hit a home run in the state championship. Ortiz played two seasons of college baseball at Walters State Community College, hitting .383 with 16 home runs and 55 RBIs as a freshman in 2023. During the summer of 2023, he played in the Appalachian League for the Kingsport Axmen. In 2024, he played in the MLB Draft League for the State College Spikes.

Ortiz was selected by the St. Louis Cardinals in the 16th round of the 2024 Major League Baseball draft. He did not play a minor league game after being drafted and played for the Gigantes de Carolina of the Puerto Rican Professional Baseball League (PRBL). He made his debut with the Cardinals organization in 2025 with the Palm Beach Cardinals and was promoted to the Peoria Chiefs during the season. He was named the Cardinals Minor League Player of the Month for June. Over 107 games between the two teams, Ortiz hit .300 with 13 home runs, 51 RBIs, and 39 stolen bases. He returned to play in the PRBL for Carolina over the winter. Ortiz was assigned to the Springfield Cardinals to open the 2026 season, but appeared in only one game before being placed on the injured list with a wrist injury in early April. He began a rehab assignment with the Florida Complex League Cardinals in June and also rehabbed with Palm Beach before he was assigned back to Springfield. Across 62 games with Springfield, Ortiz batted .279 with 10 home runs and 41 RBIs.

- Career statistics from Baseball Reference (Minors)

=== Josiah Ragsdale ===
Josiah Ragsdale

St. Louis Cardinals
- Outfielder
- Born: December 21, 2003 (age 22); Vineland, New Jersey, U.S.
- Bats: Left Throws: Left

Josiah Nasir Ragsdale (born December 21, 2003) is an American professional baseball outfielder in St. Louis Cardinals organization.

Ragsdale attended St. Augustine Preparatory School in Richland, New Jersey and played college baseball at Iona University for two years and Boston College for one. In 2025, he played collegiate summer baseball with the Brewster Whitecaps of the Cape Cod Baseball League. He was selected by the Milwaukee Brewers in the seventh round of the 2025 Major League Baseball draft.

Ragsdale made his professional debut with the Carolina Mudcats. He started 2026 with the Wisconsin Timber Rattlers before being promoted to the Biloxi Shuckers.

On August 3, 2026, the Brewers traded Ragsdale and Alexander Frias to the St. Louis Cardinals for Dustin May and JoJo Romero. St. Louis assigned him to the Springfield Cardinals.

- Career statistics from Baseball Reference (Minors)

=== Sem Robberse ===
Sem Robberse

Free agent
- Pitcher
- Born: October 12, 2001 (age 25); Zeist, Netherlands
- Bats: Right Throws: Right

Sem Robberse (robber-sa; born October 12, 2001) is a Dutch professional baseball pitcher who is a free agent.

Robberse was born in Zeist, Netherlands. In 2018, he played for HCAW of the Honkbal Hoofdklasse, the top Dutch league, and posted a 1–3 win–loss record, 1.80 earned run average (ERA), and 12 strikeouts in 20 innings pitched. The following season he played for BSC Quick Amersfoort, and in nine starts totalling 64 innings pitched, Robberse went 6–3 with a 1.83 ERA and 62 strikeouts. At an international tournament in Barcelona, Robberse was approached by scouts from several teams, including the Toronto Blue Jays and Kansas City Royals. He ultimately signed with the Blue Jays and was assigned to the Rookie-level Gulf Coast League Blue Jays. Robberse made five appearances for the Blue Jays in 2019 and went 2–0 with a 0.87 ERA and nine strikeouts in 10 1/3 innings.

The 2020 minor league season was canceled due to the COVID-19 pandemic. Due to travel restrictions Robberse was unable to return home to the Netherlands, and instead remained in Clearwater, Florida. He began the 2021 season with the Low-A Dunedin Blue Jays and was later promoted to the High-A Vancouver Canadians. In a combined 88 2/3 innings, he posted a 5–7 record with a 4.36 ERA and 90 strikeouts.

On July 30, 2023, Robberse and Adam Kloffenstein were traded to the St. Louis Cardinals in exchange for pitcher Jordan Hicks.

On November 14, 2023, the Cardinals added Robberse to their 40-man roster to protect him from the Rule 5 draft. He was optioned to the Triple&A Memphis Redbirds to begin the 2024 season. In 19 games (17 starts) split between Memphis and the Single-A Palm Beach Cardinals, Robberse compiled a 5–5 record and 4.38 ERA with 80 strikeouts across 90 1/3 innings pitched.

Robberse was optioned to Triple-A Memphis to begin the 2025 season. On May 14, 2025, it was announced that Robberse would miss the remainder of the season after undergoing Tommy John surgery. On November 21, he was non-tendered by the Cardinals and became a free agent.

On November 24, 2025, Robberse re-signed with the Cardinals on a minor league contract. Across five starts between Single-A Palm Beach and the Rookie-level Florida Complex League Cardinals he pitched nine innings in which he went 0–1 with a 6.00 ERA and nine strikeouts. He elected free agency on November 2.

- Career statistics from MLB · Fangraphs · Baseball Reference (Minors)

=== Tekoah Roby ===
Tekoah Roby

St. Louis Cardinals – No. 38
- Pitcher
- Born: September 18, 2001 (age 25); Asheville, North Carolina, U.S.
- Bats: Right Throws: Right

Tekoah Clark Roby (tuh-KOH-uh; born September 18, 2001) is an American professional baseball pitcher for the St. Louis Cardinals of Major League Baseball (MLB).

Roby attended Pine Forest High School in Pensacola, Florida. He had committed to play college baseball for Troy University. He was drafted by the Texas Rangers in the third round of the 2020 Major League Baseball draft.

He spent his professional debut season of 2021 with the Down East Wood Ducks of the Low-A East, going 2–2 with a 2.45 ERA and 35 strikeouts over 22 innings. Roby missed the majority of that season with a strain of his right elbow but did not require surgery. Roby spent the 2022 season with the Hickory Crawdads of the High-A South Atlantic League, going 3–11 with a 4.64 ERA and 126 strikeouts over 104 2/3 innings. He opened the 2023 season with the Frisco RoughRiders of the Double-A Texas League.

On July 30, 2023, Roby, John King, and Thomas Saggese were traded to the St. Louis Cardinals in exchange for Jordan Montgomery and Chris Stratton.

Roby split the 2024 campaign between the Single–A Palm Beach Cardinals and Double–A Springfield Cardinals, making 10 starts and working to a 2–3 record and 6.57 ERA with 39 strikeouts across 38 1/3 innings pitched. Following the season, the Cardinals added Roby to their 40-man roster to protect him from the Rule 5 draft.

Roby was optioned to Double-A Springfield to begin the 2025 season. In 16 starts split between Springfield and the Triple-A Memphis Redbirds, he accumulated a 7–4 record and 3.10 ERA with 87 strikeouts across 78 1/3 innings pitched. On July 18, 2025, Roby underwent Tommy John surgery, and is not expected to return to pitching until the 2027 season.

Roby was optioned to Triple-A Memphis prior to the 2026 season as he continued his rehabilitation from surgery.

- Career statistics from MLB · Baseball Reference (Minors)

=== Sandro Santana ===
Sandro Santana

St. Louis Cardinals
- Pitcher
- Born: March 7, 2005 (age 21); Barahona, Dominican Republic
- Bats: Left Throws: Left

Sandro Santana (born March 7, 2005) is a Dominican professional baseball pitcher in the St. Louis Cardinals organization.

Santana signed with the Arizona Diamondbacks as an international free agent in January 2023. He made his professional debut that year with the Dominican Summer League Diamondbacks. He pitched 2024 with the Arizona Complex League Diamondbacks and started 2025 with them before being promoted to the Visalia Rawhide. Santana started 2026 with the Hillsboro Hops and was promoted to the Amarillo Sod Poodles.

On August 3, 2026, the Diamondbacks traded Santana and Daniel Eagen to the St. Louis Cardinals in exchange for Lars Nootbaar. He started his Cardinals career with the Springfield Cardinals.

- Career statistics from Baseball Reference (Minors)

== Full Triple-A to Rookie League rosters ==
=== Triple-A ===
Memphis Redbirds roster
Players		Coaches/Other
Pitchers: 50 Jurrangelo Cijntje; -- Alex Cornwell; 38 Josh Fleming; 35 Skylar Hales; 73 Pete Hansen; 21 Ixan Henderson; 51 Austin Love; 44 Mason Molina; 68 Bobby Olsen; 43 Sandro Santana; 30 Andrew Schultz; 8 Brandt Thompson	Catchers: 7 Graysen Tarlow; Infielders: 16 Dakota Harris; 75 Noah Mendlinger; 11 Ramon Mendoza; 19 Brody Moore; 27 Trey Paige; Outfielders: 5 Chase Davis; 12 Colton Ledbetter; 15 Zach Levenson	Manager: 34 Ben Johnson; Coaches: 56 Howie Clark (hitting); -- Ollie Kadey (pitching); 36 Darwin Marrero (pitching); 32 Peter Mooney (bench); 7-day injured list; * On St. Louis Cardinals 40-man roster; ~ Development list; # Rehab assignment; ∞ Reserve list; ‡ Restricted list; § Suspended list; † Temporarily inactive list; Roster updated November 2, 2026; Transactions; → More rosters: MiLB • International League; → St. Louis Cardinals minor league players

=== Double-A ===
Ozarks Springbirds roster
Players		Coaches/Other
Pitchers: 30 Blake Aita; -- Tyler Bradt; -- Mason Burns; 47 Randel Clemente; -- Brian Curley; 48 Braden Davis; 44 Nate Dohm; 19 Liam Doyle; 27 Daniel Eagen; 18 Yhoiker Fajardo; 41 Jack Findlay; 15 Tanner Franklin; 35 Joseph King; 46 Chen-Wei Lin; 28 Domenic Picone; 43 Nolan Sparks; 33 Michael Watson; 11 Christian Worley	Catchers: 52 Ryan Campos; 40 Chase Heath; 5 Cade McGee; 31 Rainiel Rodríguez; Infielders: 26 Jesús Báez; 29 Jon Jon Gazdar; 34 Jack Gurevitch; 16 Deniel Ortiz; 8 Tre Richardson III; Outfielders: 4 Won-Bin Cho; 12 Travis Honeyman; 21 Tai Peete; 50 Ian Petrutz; 7 Luis Pino; 3 Josiah Ragsdale	Manager: 22 Patrick Anderson; Coaches: 32 Luis Arenado (assistant); 36 Danny Black (bench); 39 Eric Peterson (pitching); 25 Elvis Rodriguez (hitting); 7-day injured list; * On St. Louis Cardinals 40-man roster; ~ Development list; # Rehab assignment; ∞ Reserve list; ‡ Restricted list; § Suspended list; † Temporarily inactive list; Roster updated November 2, 2026; Transactions; → More rosters: MiLB • Texas League; → St. Louis Cardinals minor league players

=== High-A ===
Peoria Chiefs roster
Players		Coaches/Other
Pitchers: 28 Liam Best; 21 Cade Crossland; 16 Dylan Driessen; -- Frank Elissalt; 15 Patrick Galle; 47 Brian Holiday; 8 Jack Martinez; 53 Rubén Menes; 25 Jacob Odle; 11 Trey Pooser; -- Leonel Sequera; 22 Ty Van Dyke; 34 Zeke Wood; 27 Nelfy Ynfante	Catchers: 35 Alex Birge; 12 Sammy Hernandez; Infielders: 5 Michael Dattalo; 7 Anyelo Encarnación; 29 Jalin Flores; -- Josh Kross; 54 Brayden Smith; 4 Ryan Weingartner; Outfielders: 32 Tristan Bisseta; 51 Caleb Ferraro; 26 Yordalin Peña; 37 José Suárez; 52 Andrew Williamson; Designated hitters: 36 Yairo Padilla	Manager: 18 Roberto Espinoza; Coaches: 55 Jason Eary (bench); 46 Mike Habas (hitting); 47 Michael Oh (pitching); 43 Wade Stauss (assistant); 7-day injured list; * On St. Louis Cardinals 40-man roster; ~ Development list; # Rehab assignment; ∞ Reserve list; ‡ Restricted list; § Suspended list; † Temporarily inactive list; Roster updated November 2, 2026; Transactions; → More rosters: MiLB • Midwest League; → St. Louis Cardinals minor league players

=== Single-A ===
Palm Beach Cardinals roster
Players		Coaches/Other
Pitchers: 47 Jaden Alba; 39 Yadiel Batista; -- Alex Breckheimer; 43 Jan Cabrera; 33 Gabriel Chinchilla; 15 Andrew Dutkanych IV; 26 Kaden Echeman; 18 JR Fordham; 30 Branneli Franco; -- Jovi Gálvez; 28 Jesús García; 32 Brian Garmon; 34 Payton Graham; 31 Jacob Haley; -- Robbie Knowles; 46 Justin Militello; 40 Dallis Moran; 50 Jefferson Moran; 41 Keiverson Ramírez; 29 Alan Reyes; 36 Jake Shelagowski; 37 Nathan Shinn; 48 Ethan Young; 29 Earle Zulueta	Catchers: 49 J.P. Cabrera; 13 Jayden Lobliner; Infielders: 51 Heriberto Caraballo; 22 Sebastian Dos Santos; 8 Trevor Haskins; 16 Owen Henne; 3 Miguel Hernández; 4 Dee Kennedy; 35 Cristofer Lebrón; Outfielders: 25 Gabe Camacho; 11 Trevor Condon; 5 Alexander Frias; 27 Kenly Hunter; 19 Ryan Mitchell; 12 Matthew Miura	Manager: 44 Rich Benjamin; Coaches: 7 Yucary De La Cruz (bench); 27 Evan Johnson (pitching); 21 Rodrigo Vigil (assistant); 7-day injured list; * On St. Louis Cardinals 40-man roster; ~ Development list; # Rehab assignment; ∞ Reserve list; ‡ Restricted list; § Suspended list; † Temporarily inactive list; Roster updated November 7, 2026; Transactions; → More rosters: MiLB • Florida State League; → St. Louis Cardinals minor league players

=== Rookie ===
Florida Complex League Cardinals roster
Players		Coaches/Other
Pitchers: 48 Jarol Baéz; -- Hunter Baynes; 16 Andrew Bolívar; -- Nick Bonn; -- Hendrick Caña; -- Brandon Clarke; -- Luke Harrison; -- Drew Horn; -- Tegan Kuhns; 99 Reiner López; -- Dawson Montesa; 26 Brailyn Paulino; -- Cal Randall; -- Derek Schaefer; -- Giovanni Vargas; -- Anthony Watts	Catchers: -- Paulo Asprilla; -- John Lemm; -- Chris Lopez; Infielders: -- Jacob Johnson; -- Rocco Maniscalco; -- Jonathan Mejía; 12 Yeferson Portolatin; -- Daniel Rojas; 39 Juan Rujano; -- Bracewell Taveras; Outfielders: 36 Edward Guribe; 32 Yaxson Lucena; 46 Royelny Strop; -- Matthew Thomas; 40 Facundo Velásquez	Manager: 25 Willi Martin; Coaches: 50 Erick Almonte (hitting); 3 Luis Cruz (assistant); 8 Jordan Hara (hitting); 35 Gary Kendall (bench); 62 Dernier Orozco (pitching); 7-day injured list; * On St. Louis Cardinals 40-man roster; ~ Development list; # Rehab assignment; ∞ Reserve list; ‡ Restricted list; § Suspended list; † Temporarily inactive list; Roster updated November 2, 2026; Transactions; → More rosters: MiLB • Florida Complex League; → St. Louis Cardinals minor league players

=== Foreign Rookie ===
Dominican Summer League Cardinals roster
Players		Coaches/Other
Pitchers: 44 Efrén Álvarez; 34 Brayan Amoroso; 46 Jordan Beltrán; 52 Jhon Cabrera; 35 Leonil De Leon; 49 Ricardo Fernández; 33 Saúl Figuereo; 41 Juan García; -- Yonewris Garcia; 47 Andey Garrido; 16 Daniel Gómez; 30 Emilio Jiménez; 31 Javier Martínez; 51 Domingo Mejía; 58 Rafeli Moronta; 26 Kriscol Peralta; -- Briam Reyes ‡; 7 Rayner Reyes; -- Keddy Roa; 36 Beiker Rodríguez; 61 Juan Santillán; 56 Jose Vega	Catchers: 57 Héctor Cabrera; 55 Jhonny Chaparro; 38 Eduardo Mirabal; 40 Sebastian Rojas; Infielders: 12 Carlos Carrión; 25 Roberth Castillo; 18 Diego Conseción; 48 Michael Cordero; 8 Jesús Pérez; Outfielders: 21 Luis Estrella; 13 Jhon Franganten; 27 Emanuel Luna; 3 Misael Sánchez; 43 Lucas Takahashi; 19 Christopher Vargas	Manager: 11 Fray Peniche; Coaches: 28 Paul Benoit (assistant); 87 Wesslye Cuas (hitting); 89 Wilman Madera (pitching); 90 Luis Reynoso (hitting); 60 Kelvyn Rodriguez (assistant); 54 Bill Villanueva (pitching); 7-day injured list; * On St. Louis Cardinals 40-man roster; ~ Development list; # Rehab assignment; ∞ Reserve list; ‡ Restricted list; § Suspended list; † Temporarily inactive list; Roster updated November 12, 2026; Transactions; → More rosters: MiLB • Dominican Summer League; → St. Louis Cardinals minor league players
