= Ryan Helsley =

Native American baseball player (born 1994)

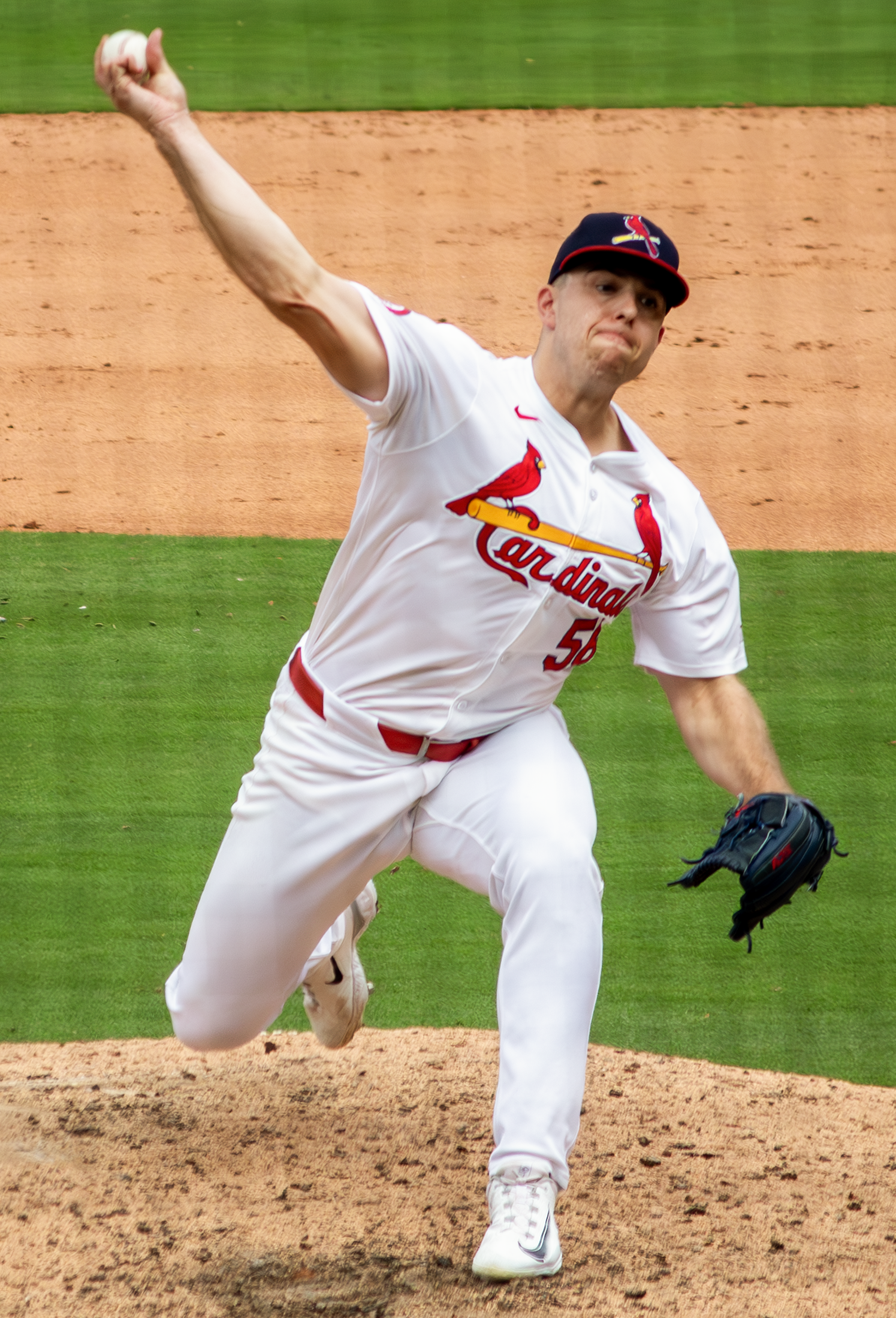
- Helsley with the Cardinals in 2024

Baltimore Orioles – No. 21
- Pitcher
- Born: July 18, 1994 (age 32); Tahlequah, Oklahoma, U.S.
- Bats: Right Throws: Right

MLB debut
- April 16, 2019, for the St. Louis Cardinals

MLB statistics (through 2026 season)
- Win–loss record: 31–22
- Earned run average: 3.01
- Strikeouts: 398
- Saves: 113
- Stats at Baseball Reference

Teams
- St. Louis Cardinals (2019–2025); New York Mets (2025); Baltimore Orioles (2026–present)

Career highlights and awards
- 2× All-Star (2022, 2024); All-MLB First Team (2024); NL Reliever of the Year (2024); MLB saves leader (2024)

Ryan Dalton Helsley (born July 18, 1994) is a Native American professional baseball pitcher for the Baltimore Orioles of Major League Baseball (MLB). He has previously played in MLB for the St. Louis Cardinals and New York Mets.

Helsley played college baseball at Northeastern State University. He was selected by the Cardinals in the fifth round of the 2015 MLB draft and made his MLB debut in 2019. Helsley broke out in 2022 while serving as the team's closer and was named an All-Star. After the 2024 season, he was named NL Reliever of the Year for the first time in his career. In 2025, the Cardinals traded Helsley to the Mets. He signed with the Orioles before the 2026 season.

== Amateur career ==
Helsley attended Sequoyah High School in Tahlequah, Oklahoma, where he played baseball, basketball, and football along with running track. Undrafted out of high school in the 2013 MLB draft, he enrolled at Northeastern State University where he played college baseball. In 2014, as a freshman, he went 7–4 with a 4.60 ERA in 14 games (nine starts) and was named the MIAA Freshman of the Year. As a sophomore, he pitched to a 14–8 record and 4.06 ERA in 126 1/3 innings pitched. After his sophomore season, he was drafted by the St. Louis Cardinals in the fifth round of the 2015 MLB draft and he signed.

== Professional career ==
=== St. Louis Cardinals (2019–2025) ===
After signing, Helsley made his professional debut with the Johnson City Cardinals and spent all of 2015 there, posting a 2.01 ERA in 40 1/3 innings. In 2016, he pitched for the Peoria Chiefs, where he posted a 10–2 record with a 1.61 ERA in 17 starts and was named a Midwest League All-Star. Helsley started 2017 with the Palm Beach Cardinals and after going 8–2 with a 2.69 ERA in 17 games (16 starts), he was promoted to the Springfield Cardinals in July. In six starts for Springfield, he was 3–1 with a 2.67 ERA. He also made one start for the Memphis Redbirds at the end of the season. Following the season, he was named the Florida State League Pitcher of the Year. Helsley began 2018 with Springfield and was promoted to Memphis during the season. However, shoulder fatigue ended his season in June. In seven starts for Springfield, he was 3–2 with a 4.39 ERA, and in five starts for Memphis he pitched to a 2–1 record and a 3.71 ERA. The Cardinals added Helsley to their 40-man roster after the 2018 season.

Helsley began 2019 back with Memphis. On April 16, he was called up to the major leagues for the first time. He made his debut that night, throwing two and a third innings in relief and recording a single in his first major league at-bat. Helsley was placed on the injured list on June 13 with right shoulder impingement, and was reassigned to Memphis following his activation on July 3. Helsley was recalled for the final time on August 4, spending the remainder of his 2019 season in the St. Louis bullpen. Over 36 2/3 relief innings with the Cardinals, Helsley went 2–0 with a 2.95 ERA, striking out 32. In that year's postseason, he pitched 5 1/3 innings with no earned runs and 8 strikeouts.

Helsley with the Cardinals in 2025

Helsley began the 2020 season with St. Louis. On August 7, it was announced he had tested positive for COVID-19. Helsley finished the pandemic-shortened season with a 1–1 record, 5.25 ERA and one save in 12 innings of work. In 2021, Helsley appeared in 51 games with the Cardinals in which he went 6-4 with a 4.56 ERA and 47 strikeouts over 47 1/3 innings before he was shut down in mid-August with knee and elbow injures.

In 2022, Helsley compiled a first-half 5–1 record with a 0.73 ERA, 54 strikeouts, and seven saves over 37 innings, and was consequently selected to represent the Cardinals at the All-Star Game in Los Angeles. On September 16, Helsley pitched an immaculate inning against the Cincinnati Reds striking out Kyle Farmer, Jake Fraley, and Donovan Solano in the 9th inning. Helsley finished the 2022 season with 54 relief appearances in which he went 9–1 with a 1.25 ERA, 94 strikeouts, and 19 saves over 64 2/3 innings. In the postseason, Helsley, who had jammed fingers on his throwing hand in his final regular-season appearance, was the loser in Game 1 of the 2022 National League Wild Card Series, allowing a single, two walks, and a hit batter in successive 9th inning plate appearances for four earned runs in a game the Philadelphia Phillies won 6–3.

Helsley began the 2023 season in the St. Louis bullpen, and logged a 3.24 ERA in 22 appearances before he was placed on the injured list with a right forearm strain on June 12, 2023. He was transferred to the 60-day injured list on July 24. Helsley was activated on September 1.

He was named NL Reliever of the Month for April 2024, with his 16 appearances, 10 saves, a 1.69 ERA, and 9.5-to-1 strikeout-to-walk ratio (19 strikeouts, two walks). He recorded a Cardinals record 49th save on September 27, 2024.

In 65 appearances for St. Louis in 2024, Helsley posted a 2.04 ERA with a 7–4 record along with 49 saves and 79 strikeouts. After the season, he was named NL Reliever of the Year for the first time in his career.

On June 28, 2025, Helsley recorded his 100th career save against the Cleveland Guardians. Across 36 games for the Cardinals in 2025, he was 3–1 with a 3.00 ERA and 41 strikeouts in 36 innings pitched.

=== New York Mets (2025) ===
On July 30, 2025, the Cardinals traded Helsley to the New York Mets in exchange for prospects Jesús Báez, Nate Dohm, and Frank Elissalt. Helsley immediately made an impact on the Mets, blowing four saves and recording a 10.38 ERA across 9 2/3 innings pitched in August. He improved in September, giving up no runs across his last seven innings of the season.

Across 22 games for the Mets in 2025, he was 0–3 with a 7.20 ERA, giving up 20 runs (16 earned) in 20 innings pitched.

=== Baltimore Orioles (2026–present) ===
On December 1, 2025, Helsley signed a two-year, $28 million contract with the Baltimore Orioles. On July 3, 2026, Helsley was placed on the injured list due to right elbow discomfort. He was transferred to the 60-day injured list on July 19. Helsley was shut down for the remainder of the 2026 season on September 19, with Orioles president of baseball operations Mike Elias saying the team decided against contracting his buildup to prioritize the next season. For the 2026 season, Helsley made 17 relief appearances and had a 0–4 record, a 4.11 ERA, 21 strikeouts, and eight saves across 15 1/3 innings.

On October 29, 2026, Helsley exercised his player option with the Orioles for the 2027 season.

== Personal life ==
Helsley is a Christian. Helsley and his wife, Alex, married in July 2021. Their first child, a daughter, was born in August 2022.

Helsley is a citizen of the Cherokee Nation and has some ability to speak the Cherokee language.

During the 2019 National League Division Series against the Atlanta Braves, Helsley was asked about the Braves' rallying cry "The Tomahawk Chop". Helsley said he found the fans' chanting and arm motions insulting and that the chop depicts natives "in this kind of caveman-type people way who aren't intellectual". Helsley's comments prompted the Braves to stop handing out foam tomahawks, playing the chop music, or showing the chop graphic when the series returned to Atlanta for game 5. The Braves released a statement saying they would "continue to evaluate how we activate elements of our brand, as well as the overall in-game experience" and that they would continue a "dialogue with those in the Native American community after the postseason concludes".

He grew up a St. Louis Cardinals fan.
