= Lars Nootbaar =

American baseball player (born 1997)

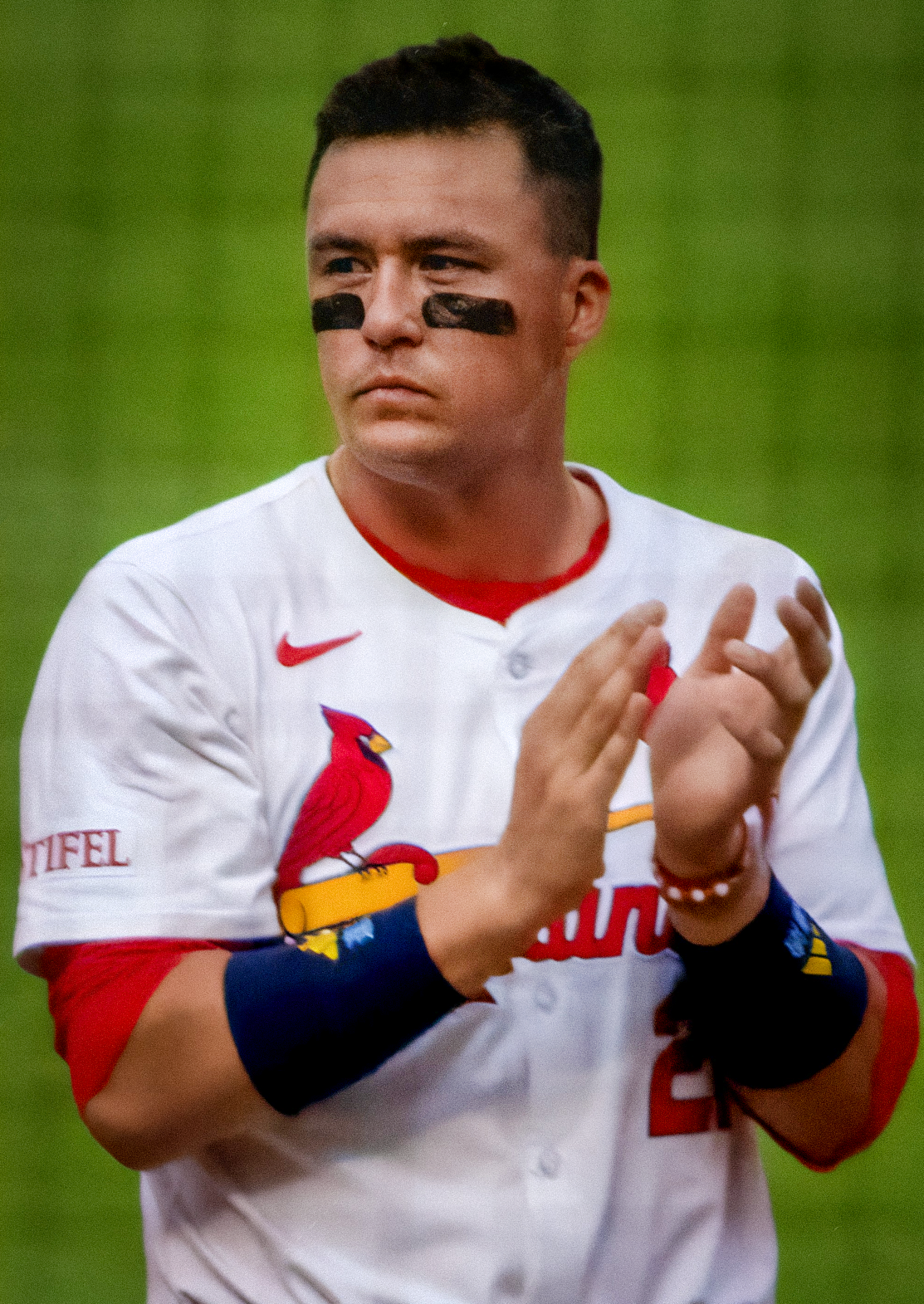
- Nootbaar with the Cardinals in 2025

Arizona Diamondbacks – No. 21
- Outfielder
- Born: September 8, 1997 (age 29); El Segundo, California, U.S.
- Bats: Left Throws: Right

MLB debut
- June 22, 2021, for the St. Louis Cardinals

MLB statistics (through 2026 season)
- Batting average: .241
- Home runs: 66
- Runs batted in: 227
- Stats at Baseball Reference

Teams
- St. Louis Cardinals (2021–2026); Arizona Diamondbacks (2026–present)
Medals
Men's baseball
Representing Japan
World Baseball Classic
Gold medal – first place	2023 Miami	Team

Lars Taylor-Tatsuji Nootbaar (Japanese: 榎田 達治, Hepburn: Enokida Tatsuji; born September 8, 1997) is an American professional baseball outfielder for the Arizona Diamondbacks of Major League Baseball (MLB). He has previously played in MLB for the St. Louis Cardinals. On the international level, he represents the Japan national baseball team.

Born and raised in El Segundo, California, Nootbaar played three seasons of college baseball at the University of Southern California. The Cardinals selected him in the eighth round of the 2018 MLB draft, and he made his MLB debut in 2021.

== Early life and amateur career ==
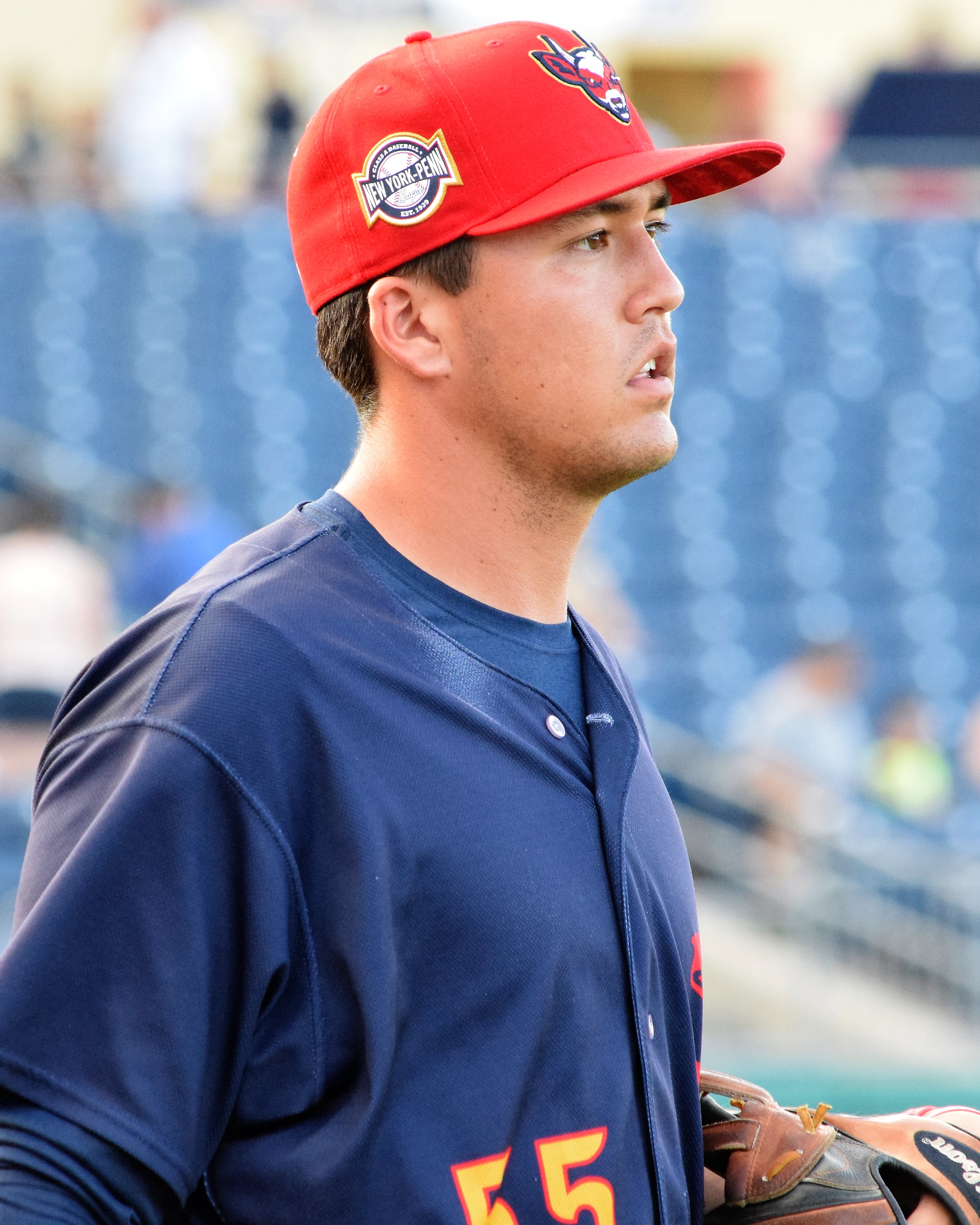
Nootbaar with the State College Spikes in 2018

Nootbaar was born to an American father of Dutch descent, Charlie Nootbaar, and a Japanese mother, Kumiko Enokida. Nootbaar grew up in El Segundo, California.

He later attended El Segundo High School, where he played baseball and football. He was a three-time league MVP in baseball and twice in football as the Eagles' starting quarterback. He committed to play college baseball at the University of Southern California (USC) and was recruited to play college football by UC Davis and Fordham.

Nootbaar was a three-year starter for the USC Trojans, where his older brother Nigel had played. After his freshman year, he played summer league baseball for the La Crosse Loggers of the Northwoods League. As a sophomore with the Trojans, he was named All-Pac-12 Conference after hitting .313 with 34 RBIs, 33 runs scored, and seven home runs. Following the season, he again played summer wood-bat ball, this time with the Orleans Firebirds of the Cape Cod Baseball League. As a junior, Nootbaar had a .249 batting average with six home runs and 24 runs batted in (RBIs).

== Professional career ==
=== St. Louis Cardinals ===
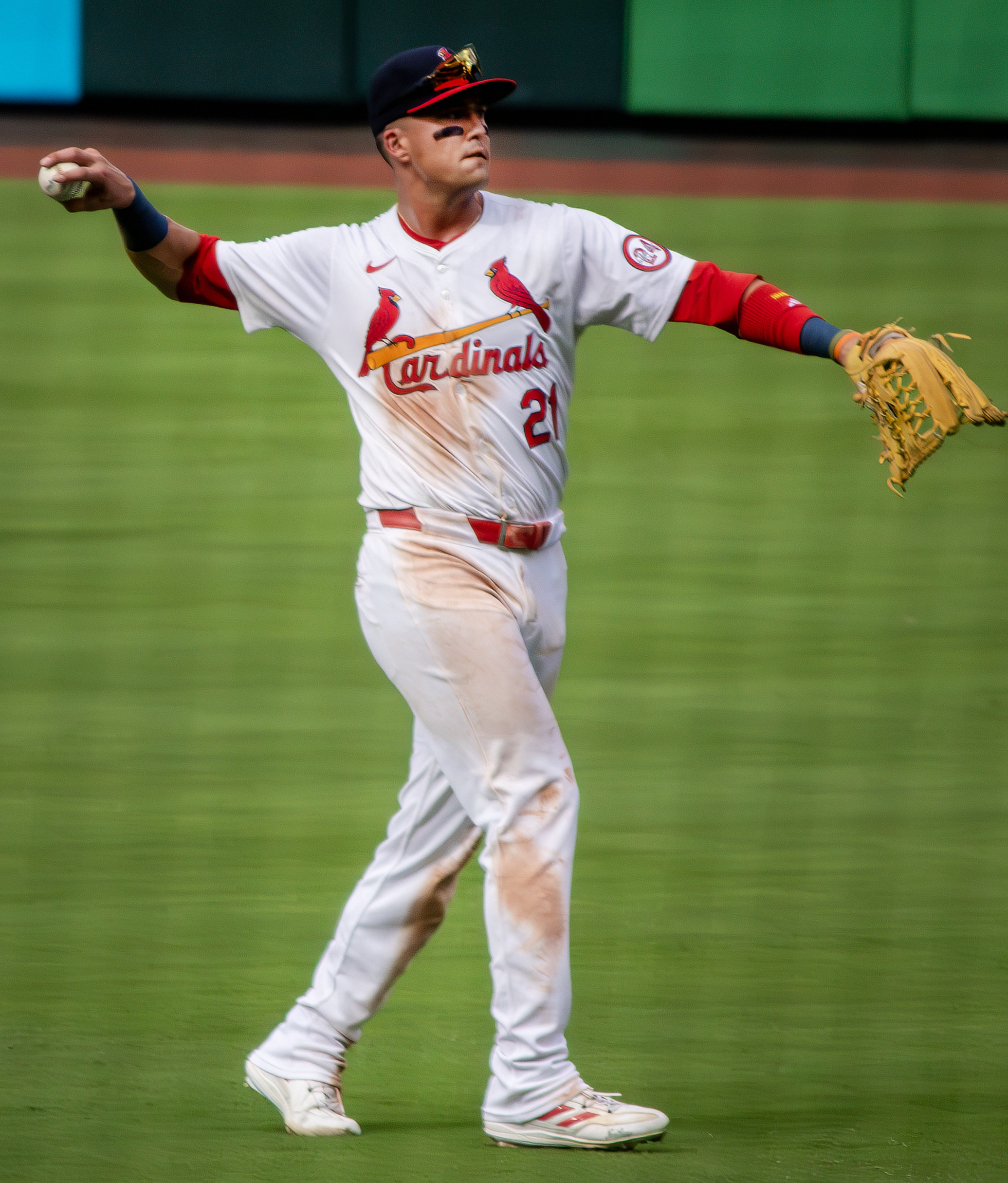
Nootbaar with St. Louis in 2024.

The St. Louis Cardinals selected Nootbaar in the eighth round of the 2018 Major League Baseball draft. After signing with the team, he was assigned to the State College Spikes of the Low-A New York–Penn League, where he set a team record with seven RBI in one game. For the season, he hit .227 with two home runs and 26 RBI in 56 games. Nootbaar began the 2019 season with the Single-A Peoria Chiefs of the Midwest League before being promoted to the High-A Palm Beach Cardinals of the Florida State League. He was promoted a second time to the Springfield Cardinals of the Double-A Texas League. Over 101 games between the three clubs, he batted .264 with seven home runs and 38 RBI. In 2020, the minor league season was canceled by the COVID-19 pandemic.

Nootbaar began the 2021 season at the Cardinals' alternate training site before being reassigned to the Triple-A East Memphis Redbirds. He was placed on the injured list with a hand injury on May 28 and was activated on June 14.

On June 22, 2021, Nootbaar was selected to the 40-man roster and promoted to the major leagues for the first time. At the time of his promotion, he had a .329/.430/.557 slash line with five home runs and 17 RBI over 22 games. He made his MLB debut that day as the starting left fielder against the Detroit Tigers. The following day, Nootbaar recorded his first MLB hit, a triple. He hit his first MLB home run as a pinch hitter off JT Brubaker in a 7–6 win over the Pittsburgh Pirates on August 12. Nootbaar hit another pinch-hit home run the next day in a 6–0 victory over the Kansas City Royals. On August 25, Nootbaar got his first career walk-off hit, a single in the 10th inning against Detroit Tigers reliever Michael Fulmer. Nootbaar finished 2021 slashing .239/.317/.422 with five home runs and 15 RBI over 124 plate appearances in the majors. He played in the Arizona Fall League for the Glendale Desert Dogs after the season.

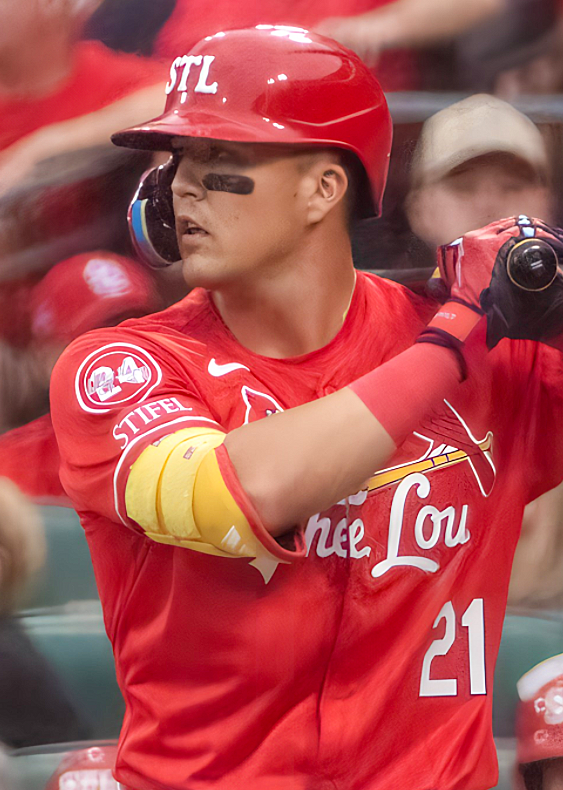
Nootbaar in 2024

Nootbaar entered the 2022 season as the Cardinals' fourth outfielder before eventually moving into a starting role after others' injuries and his strong play. Over 108 games for St. Louis, he hit .228/.340/.448 with 14 home runs, 40 RBIs, and 16 doubles. Nootbaar mainly played in center field for the Cardinals in 2023, also spending time in left and right field. Over 117 games, he batted .261 with 14 home runs and 46 RBIs. He suffered rib fractures before the 2024 season. His performance and playing time dipped in 2024, as he batted .244 with 12 home runs in 109 games.

In 2025, Nootbaar made 135 appearances for St. Louis, hitting .234/.325/.361 with 13 home runs and 48 RBI. On October 17, 2025, the Cardinals announced that Nootbaar had undergone surgeries on both heels ten days prior to remove Haglund's deformities. On October 26, Chaim Bloom announced that Nootbaar could begin the 2026 season on the injured list as a result of the surgeries.

Nootbaar was placed on the 60-day injured list to begin the regular season on March 25, 2026. On June 5, Nootbaar was activated from the injured list. He made his season debut the same day, going 2-for-6 with one double, one run, and one RBI. Nootbaar played in 48 games for St. Louis, hitting .234 with three home runs and 16 RBI.

=== Arizona Diamondbacks ===
On August 3, 2026, the Cardinals traded Nootbaar to the Arizona Diamondbacks in exchange for Daniel Eagen, Sandro Santana, and a player to be named later.

== International career ==
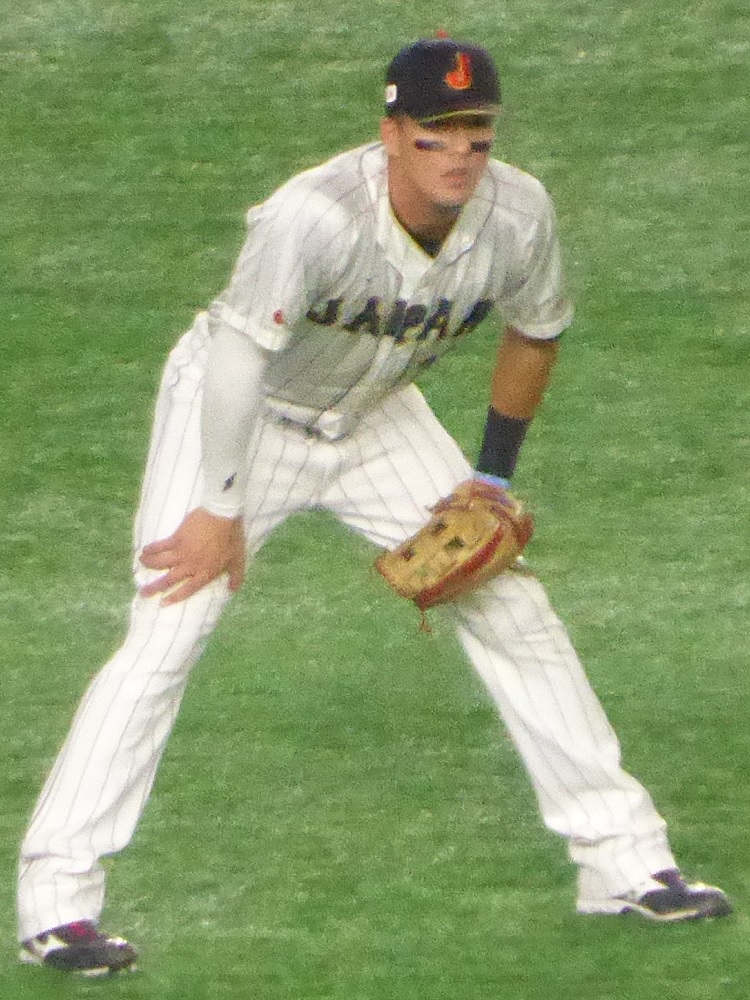
Nootbaar with Japan at Tokyo Dome on March 16, 2023

In 2006, a Japanese national youth team toured the US, including future MLB pitcher Masahiro Tanaka and Japanese high school pitching phenom Yuki Saito. The nine-year-old Nootbaar served as a batboy and interacted with the team, including stretching and playing catch, and some of the players stayed at his house and ate with the family. According to his mother, this experience later led Nootbaar to accept an offer to join the Japanese national team for the 2023 World Baseball Classic. Japan won the tournament, with Nootbaar batting leadoff and recording an RBI in the championship game against the United States. Nootbaar was the first player not born in Japan to represent the country in a World Baseball Classic. Nootbaar was unable to compete in the 2026 WBC due to recovering from a recent surgery.

== Personal life ==
Nootbaar's parents met while they were students at Cal Poly San Luis Obispo. Nootbaar's older brother, Nigel, pitched at USC and then played professionally in the Baltimore Orioles minor league system from 2012 to 2015. Nootbaar also has a sister. Nootbaar was a Los Angeles Dodgers fan growing up.

Nootbaar has one of his middle names "Tatsuji," also his grandfather's name, printed on some of his baseball equipment.

During the 2022 season, Nootbaar became a Cardinals fan favorite, often being greeted with "Nooooot!" when batting or making a defensive play.
