= Tanner Franklin =

American baseball player (born 2004)

St. Louis Cardinals
- Pitcher
- Born: May 25, 2004 (age 22); Jefferson City, Tennessee, U.S.
- Bats: Right Throws: Right

William Tanner Franklin (born May 25, 2004) is an American professional baseball pitcher in the St. Louis Cardinals organization.

== Amateur career ==
Franklin attended Jefferson County High School in Dandridge, Tennessee. In Franklin's senior season, he was named an all-state, all-region, all-district, and MVP Pitcher. He committed to play college baseball at Kennesaw State University for the Owls.

Franklin saw limited action as a freshman at Kennesaw State, playing in 13 games with two starts on the mound, throwing 11 total innings with 18 strikeouts. As a sophomore in 2024 with the Owls, Franklin tied for the team lead with 21 appearances, posting a 4-1 record and five saves in 27 1/3 innings of work while striking out 43 batters. Following the season, he transferred to the University of Tennessee to play for the Volunteers. For the 2025 season with Tennessee, he made one start and 27 total appearances, setting career highs in appearances with 27, strikeouts with 52, and ERA with 4.89 ERA across 38 2/3 innings.

== Professional career ==
Franklin entered the 2025 Major League Baseball draft as a top pitching prospect. He was selected by the St. Louis Cardinals with the 72nd overall pick. Franklin signed with the team for $1.1 million.

Franklin made his professional debut after signing with the Single-A Palm Beach Cardinals and also played with the High-A Peoria Chiefs, pitching a total of six innings between the two teams with nine strikeouts. He returned to Peoria to begin the 2026 season. In August, he was promoted to the Double-A Springfield Cardinals.
