= Florida State League Pitcher of the Year Award =

- Sport: Baseball
- League: Florida State League
- Awarded for: Best regular season pitcher in the Florida State League
- Country: United States
- Presented by: Florida State League

History
- First award: Ismael Ramirez (2004)
- Most recent: Henry Lalane (2026)

The Florida State League Pitcher of the Year Award is an annual award given to the best pitcher in minor league baseball's Florida State League.

Three players from the Palm Beach Cardinals and Tampa Yankees have been selected for the Pitcher of the Year Award, more than any other teams in the league, followed by the Bradenton Marauders, Charlotte Stone Crabs, Clearwater Threshers, Daytona Tortugas, Dunedin Blue Jays, Jupiter Hammerheads, Lakeland Flying Tigers, and St. Lucie Mets (2); and the Fort Myers Miracle (1).

Three players from the New York Yankees and St. Louis Cardinals Major League Baseball (MLB) organizations have won the Pitcher of the Year Award, more than any others, followed by the Cincinnati Reds, Detroit Tigers, New York Mets, Philadelphia Phillies, Pittsburgh Pirates, Tampa Bay Rays, and Toronto Blue Jays (2); and the Florida Marlins, Miami Marlins, and Minnesota Twins organizations (1).

== Key ==
*	Indicates multiple award winners in the same year

== Winners ==
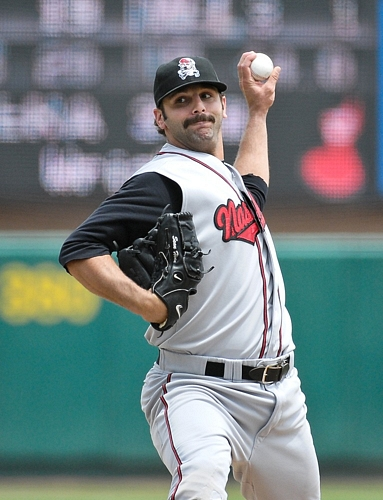
Chase Wright, 2006 Florida State League Pitcher of the Year

Year	Winner	Team	Organization	Record	Saves	ERA	Ks	Ref(s).
2004	Ismael Ramirez	Dunedin Blue Jays	Toronto Blue Jays	15–6	0	2.72	131	
2005	Jordan Tata	Lakeland Tigers	Detroit Tigers	13–2	0	2.79	134	
2006	Chase Wright	Tampa Yankees	New York Yankees	12–3	0	1.88	100	
2007	Eric Wordekemper	Tampa Yankees	New York Yankees	2–0	33	0.57	34	
2008	Dylan Owen	St. Lucie Mets	New York Mets	12–6	0	3.43	116	
2009	David Bromberg	Fort Myers Miracle	Minnesota Twins	13–4	0	2.70	148	
2010	Austin Hyatt	Clearwater Threshers	Philadelphia Phillies	11–5	0	3.04	156	
2011	Darin Gorski	St. Lucie Mets	New York Mets	11–3	1	2.08	140	
2012	Austin Wright	Clearwater Threshers	Philadelphia Phillies	11–5	0	3.47	133	
2013	Justin Nicolino	Jupiter Hammerheads	Florida Marlins	5–2	0	2.23	64	
2014	Tyler Glasnow	Bradenton Marauders	Pittsburgh Pirates	12–5	0	1.74	157	
2015^{*}	Jacob Faria	Charlotte Stone Crabs	Tampa Bay Rays	10–1	0	1.33	63	
2015^{*}	Amir Garrett	Daytona Tortugas	Cincinnati Reds	9–7	0	2.44	133	
2016	Luis Castillo	Jupiter Hammerheads	Miami Marlins	8–4	0	2.07	91	
2017	Ryan Helsley	Palm Beach Cardinals	St. Louis Cardinals	8–2	0	2.69	91	
2018	Patrick Murphy	Dunedin Blue Jays	Toronto Blue Jays	10–5	0	2.64	135	
2019	Tommy Romero	Charlotte Stone Crabs	Tampa Bay Rays	12–4	0	1.89	103	
2020	None selected (season cancelled due to COVID-19 pandemic)							
2021	Adrian Florencio	Bradenton Marauders	Pittsburgh Pirates	6–4	0	2.46	117	
2022	Tink Hence	Palm Beach Cardinals	St. Louis Cardinals	0–1	0	1.38	81	
2023	Max Rajcic	Palm Beach Cardinals	St. Louis Cardinals	6–3	0	1.89	68	
2024	Nestor Lorant	Daytona Tortugas	Cincinnati Reds	8–3	3	1.44	99	
2025	Lucas Elissalt	Lakeland Flying Tigers	Detroit Tigers	4–1	0	2.48	77	
2026	Henry Lalane	Tampa Yankees	New York Yankees	4–1	0	2.74	81	
