= Jordan Tata =

American baseball player (born 1981)

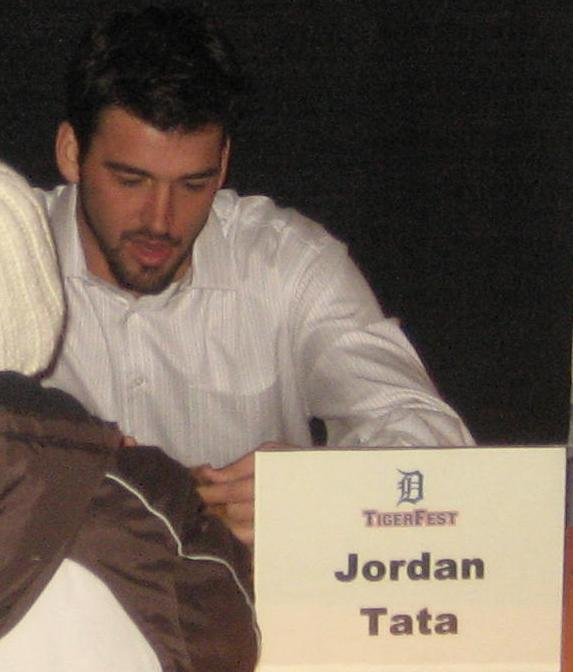
- Pitcher
- Born: September 20, 1981 (age 43); Plano, Texas, U.S.
- Batted: Right Threw: Right

MLB debut
- April 6, 2006, for the Detroit Tigers

Last MLB appearance
- August 10, 2007, for the Detroit Tigers

MLB statistics
- Win–loss record: 1–1
- Earned run average: 6.91
- Strikeouts: 14
- Stats at Baseball Reference

Teams
- Detroit Tigers (2006–2007)

Jordan Arthur Tata (TAY-ta) (born September 20, 1981) is an American former professional baseball pitcher. He played in Major League Baseball (MLB) for the Detroit Tigers from 2006 to 2007. He played college baseball at Sam Houston State. He is 6 feet 6 inches (1.98 m) tall and weighs 220 pounds (100 kg). Tata bats and throws right-handed.

== Career ==
=== Detroit Tigers ===
While pitching for the High–A Lakeland Tigers in 2005, Tata made the Florida State League All-Star team as a starting pitcher, and at the season's end he was named the league's Pitcher of the Year.

Tata made his major league debut on April 6, 2006 against the Texas Rangers in a 10-6 win.

Tata picked up his first big league win on July 30, 2007 while pitching in place of the injured Kenny Rogers. The Tigers beat the Oakland Athletics by a score of 5-2. Tata struck out 5, walked 2 and allowed 6 hits and 2 earned runs. Todd Jones gave Tata the customary shaving cream-pie to the face during a post game interview. Tata's second start at Comerica Park August 3 resulted in a 3-1 loss. He gave up all three runs in 5 innings pitched.

Tata spent the 2008 baseball season pitching for the Lakeland Flying Tigers of the Florida State League and the Gulf Coast Tigers of the Rookie League.

After a rough spring, the Tigers released Tata on April 1, 2009.

=== Grand Prairie AirHogs ===
On April 15, 2009, Tata signed with the Grand Prairie AirHogs of the American Association of Independent Professional Baseball. In 3 starts for the team, he struggled to a 7.20 ERA with 7 strikeouts over 10 innings of work. The AirHogs released Tata on July 1.
