= Liam Doyle (baseball) =

American baseball player (born 2004)

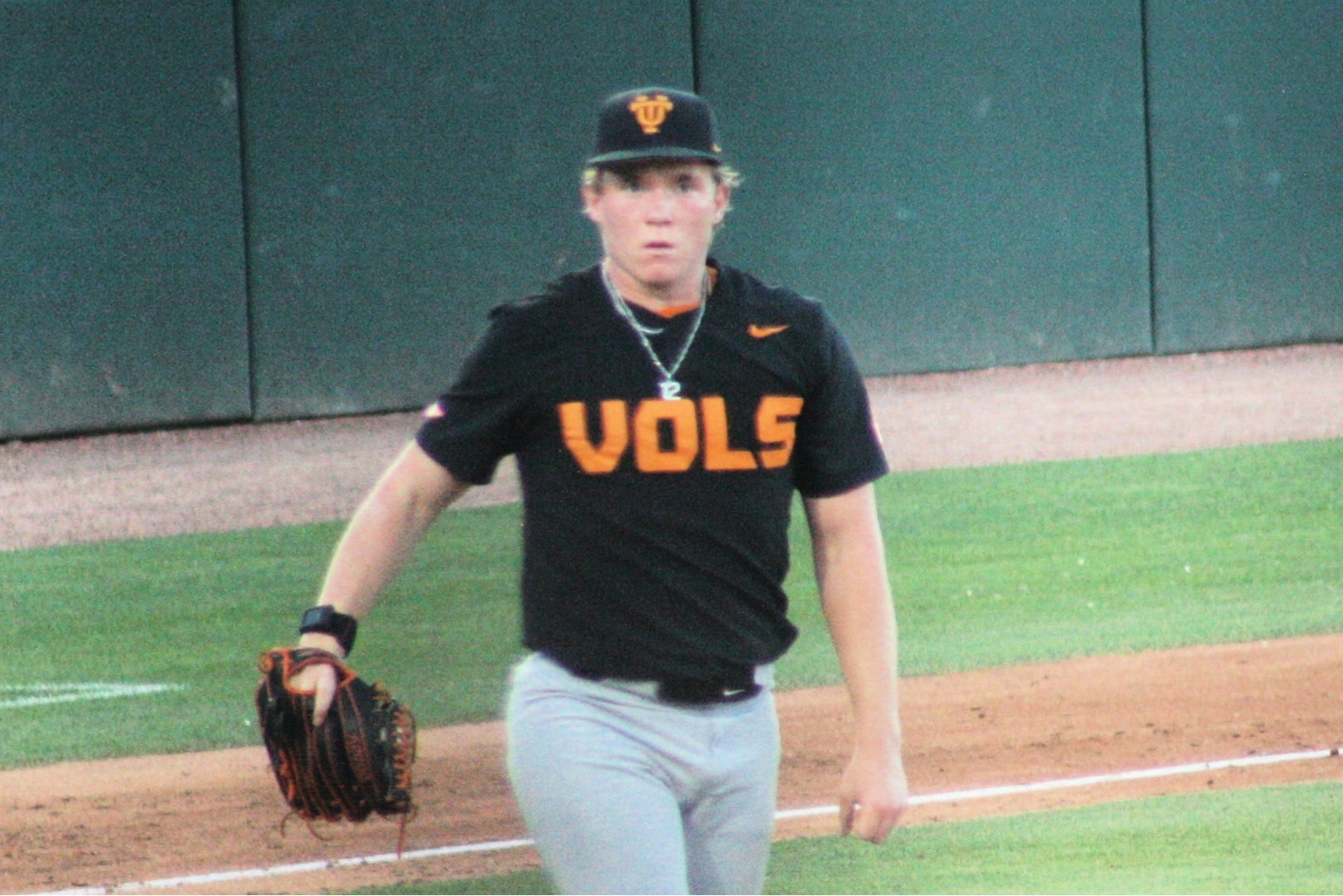
- Doyle with Tennessee in 2025

St. Louis Cardinals
- Pitcher
- Born: June 3, 2004 (age 22); Boston, Massachusetts, U.S.
- Bats: Right Throws: Left
- Stats at Baseball Reference

Teams
- SEC Pitcher of the Year (2025)

Liam Shannon Doyle (born June 3, 2004) is an American professional baseball pitcher in the St. Louis Cardinals organization.

== Amateur career ==
Doyle was born in Boston but grew up in New Hampshire. He attended Pinkerton Academy in Derry, New Hampshire. Over his junior and senior seasons in high school he combined to go 15–2 with a 0.68 earned run average (ERA) with 226 strikeouts in 113 innings.

Doyle started his college baseball career with Coastal Carolina University in 2023. He appeared in 23 games with seven starts and went 3–1 with a 4.15 ERA and 69 strikeouts in 56 1/3 innings. After the season, Doyle played collegiate summer baseball with the Bourne Braves of the Cape Cod Baseball League, and entered the transfer portal and transferred to the University of Mississippi (Ole Miss). In his lone season at Ole Miss in 2024, he started 11 of 16 games, going 3–4 with 5.73 ERA and 84 strikeouts in 55 innings. Doyle entered the transfer portal after his lone season with Ole Miss, and transferred to the University of Tennessee.

Doyle entered the 2025 season as Tennessee's number one starter. In March 2025, Doyle was ranked by Keith Law of The Athletic as the top prospect in the 2025 Major League Baseball draft. Against the St. Bonaventure Bonnies, he combined with four other pitchers to throw the first no-hitter for Tennessee since 2002. Doyle appeared in 19 games (with 17 starts) for Tennessee, going 10-4 with a 3.20 ERA and 164 strikeouts and was named the Southeastern Conference Baseball Pitcher of the Year.

== Professional career ==
The St. Louis Cardinals selected Doyle in the first round, with the fifth overall pick, in the 2025 Major League Baseball draft. On July 17, 2025, Doyle signed with the Cardinals for a $7.25 million signing bonus.

Doyle made his professional debut after signing on September 6, 2025, with the Single-A Palm Beach Cardinals, giving up one run and recording three strikeouts over 1 2/3 innings. He was then promoted to the Double-A Springfield Cardinals, with whom he pitched two scoreless innings. Doyle returned to Springfield for the 2026 season. He made 23 starts and ended the season with a 7–7 record, a 3.76 ERA, and 130 strikeouts across 103 innings.
