= Ozarks Springbirds =

- Founded in 2005; Springfield, Missouri
Team logo
Cap insignia

Minor league affiliations
- Class: Double-A (2005–present)
- League: Texas League (2005–present)
- Division: North Division

Major league affiliations
- Team: St. Louis Cardinals (2005–present)

Minor league titles
- League titles (2): 2012; 2025
- Division titles (4): 2007; 2012; 2025; 2026
- First-half titles (5): 2007; 2009; 2016; 2024; 2025
- Second-half titles (5): 2007; 2012; 2023; 2025; 2026
- Wild card berths (1): 2010

Team data
- Name: Ozarks Springbirds (2027–present)
- Previous names: Springfield Cardinals (2005–2026)
- Colors: Cardinal red, midnight navy blue, yellow, light blue, green, white
- Ballpark: Route 66 Stadium (2005–present)
- Owner/ Operator: Diamond Baseball Holdings
- General manager: Dan Reiter
- Manager: Patrick Anderson
- Media: Springfield Daily Citizen (online newspaper) KRVI 106.7 FM (radio); KYTV NBC 3/KYCW CW 24 (television) Bally Sports Live (internet)
- Website: mlb.com/milb/springfield

The Ozarks Springbirds are a Minor League Baseball team based in Springfield, Missouri. They are members of the Texas League's North Division and serve as the Double-A affiliate of the St. Louis Cardinals. The team plays their home games at Route 66 Stadium (formerly Hammons Field), which opened in 2004.

The Springbirds were established in 2005 as the Springfield Cardinals after the El Paso Diablos relocated to Springfield following the 2004 season. Following the 2026 season, the Cardinals rebranded as the Springbirds. Ozarks has won five first-half titles, five second-half titles, three division titles, and two Texas League championships (2012 and 2025).

== History ==
=== Prior professional baseball in Springfield ===
Springfield, Missouri, has hosted professional baseball teams since as early as 1887, with the Southwestern League's Springfield Indians being the first to represent the city. Several other minor league baseball clubs followed, including the Reds (1902), Midgets (1903–1904, 1906–1909), Highlanders (1905), Jobbers (1911), Merchants (1920), and Red Wings (1931, 1934). These teams were generally Class C ball clubs in the Western Association. There were also several years when no team existed at all.

In 1931, the St. Louis Cardinals purchased a minor league team, renamed it the Cardinals, and relocated it in Springfield. That year, the team won the first of several Western Association championships. With a front office led by future Hall of Famer Branch Rickey, Springfield also went to the playoffs in 1931, 1932, 1934, 1935, 1937, 1938, 1939, and 1941, and won league titles in 1931, 1932, 1934, 1937, and 1939.

Following the 1946 season, St. Louis moved the team to St. Joseph, Missouri, where it remained until 1953. The city of Springfield saw a brief re-emergence of minor league baseball when the rival Chicago Cubs moved its affiliate to Springfield for one season as the Springfield Cubs.

=== Springfield Cardinals (2005–2026) ===
The current team was established in 2005 as the Springfield Cardinals. The Texas League franchise was previously located in El Paso, Texas, where they were known as the El Paso Diablos. That team's owners sold the club to the St. Louis Cardinals and were then moved to Springfield as part of their minor league system, replacing the Tennessee Smokies, who had been St. Louis' Double-A affiliate from 2003 and 2004.

In 2012, the Cardinals qualified for the playoffs by finishing the second half of the season in first place in the Northern Division on the way to posting a division-best and franchise-high 77–61 record over the entire campaign. They went on to defeat the Tulsa Drillers, 3–2, in the best-of-five divisional playoff series, advancing to the championship series. Springfield defeated the Frisco RoughRiders, 3–2, best-of-five finals to win their first Texas League championship. Key players included Kolten Wong, Jermaine Curtis, Carlos Martinez, Trevor Rosenthal, Vance Albitz, Oscar Taveras, and Xavier Scruggs.

In conjunction with Major League Baseball's restructuring of Minor League Baseball in 2021, the Cardinals were organized into the Double-A Central. In 2022, the Double-A Central became known as the Texas League, the name historically used by the regional circuit prior to the 2021 reorganization.

On May 1, 2023, the Springfield Cardinals were sold by the St. Louis Cardinals to Diamond Baseball Holdings.

Springfield won a second Texas League championship in 2025.

=== Ozarks Springbirds (2027–present) ===
After playing as the Cardinals for 22 seasons, the team rebranded for the 2027 season as the Ozarks Springbirds.

== Route 66 Stadium ==
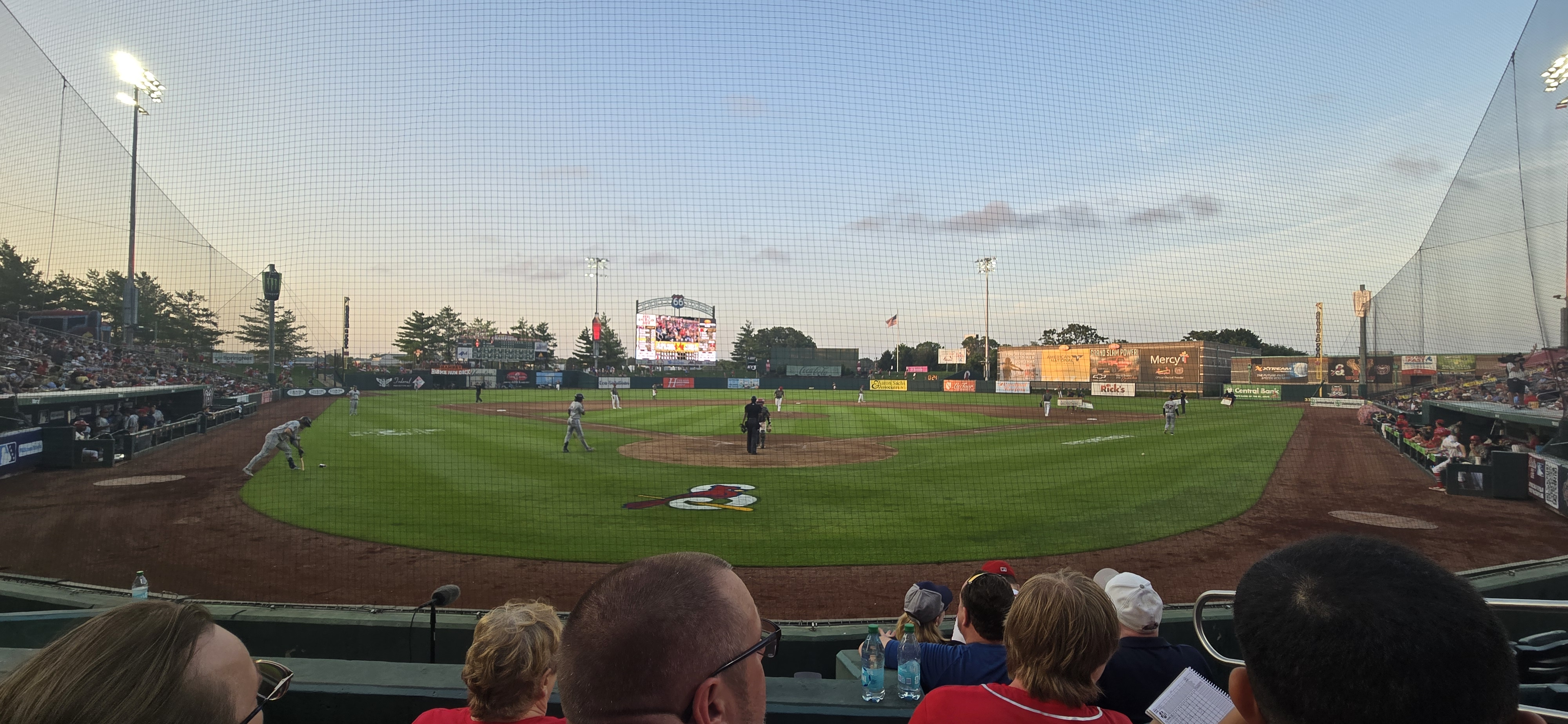
Route 66 Stadium in 2026

The Ozarks Springbirds play at Route 66 Stadium, which has a capacity of 7,986 people plus approximately 2,500 more in general admission seating.

== Mascots ==
The Ozarks Springbirds have two mascots. Their first and main mascot is a brightly colored red bird named Louie. He has been a mascot for the team since its formation as the Cardinals in 2005. He is the "little brother" of Fredbird, mascot of the St. Louis Cardinals. Their second mascot is a fluffy dog named Fetch. He is a fluffy beagle received by Louie as a birthday gift on Opening Day in 2006. During home games they can be found entertaining fans by tossing t-shirts and taking photos. Louie and Fetch also attend local events in the community. The mascots remained unchanged with the rebranding to the Springbirds.

== Roster ==
Ozarks Springbirds roster
Players	Coaches/Other
Pitchers: 30 Blake Aita; 47 Randel Clemente; 37 José Davila; 48 Braden Davis; 44 Nate Dohm; 19 Liam Doyle; 27 Daniel Eagen; 18 Yhoiker Fajardo; 41 Jack Findlay; 15 Tanner Franklin; 35 Joseph King; 46 Chen-Wei Lin; 28 Domenic Picone; 38 Darlin Saladin; 43 Nolan Sparks; 33 Michael Watson; 11 Christian Worley; Catchers: 52 Ryan Campos; 40 Chase Heath; 5 Cade McGee; 31 Rainiel Rodríguez; Infielders: 26 Jesús Báez; 29 Jon Jon Gazdar; 34 Jack Gurevitch; 16 Deniel Ortiz; 8 Tre Richardson III; Outfielders: 4 Won-Bin Cho; 12 Travis Honeyman; 21 Tai Peete; 50 Ian Petrutz; 7 Luis Pino; 3 Josiah Ragsdale	Manager: 22 Patrick Anderson; Coaches: 32 Luis Arenado (assistant); 36 Danny Black (bench); 39 Eric Peterson (pitching); 25 Elvis Rodriguez (hitting); 60-day injured list: -- Tyler Bradt; -- Mason Burns (full season); 7-day injured list; * On St. Louis Cardinals 40-man roster; ~ Development list; # Rehab assignment; ∞ Reserve list; ‡ Restricted list; § Suspended list; † Temporarily inactive list; Roster updated September 27, 2026; Transactions; → More rosters: MiLB • Texas League; → St. Louis Cardinals minor league players
