= Peoria Chiefs =

American Minor League baseball team

- Founded in 1983; Peoria, Illinois
Team logo
Cap insignia

Minor league affiliations
- Class: High-A (2021–present)
- Previous classes: Class A (1983–2020)
- League: Midwest League (1983–present)
- Division: West Division

Major league affiliations
- Team: St. Louis Cardinals (2013–present)
- Previous teams: Chicago Cubs (2005–2012); St. Louis Cardinals (1995–2004); Chicago Cubs (1985–1994); California Angels (1983–1984)

Minor league titles
- League titles (1): 2002
- Division titles (4): 1985; 1986; 2002; 2018
- First-half titles (3): 2002; 2006; 2016
- Second-half titles (2): 1996; 2009
- Wild card berths (8): 1985; 1986; 1998; 2004; 2015; 2017; 2018; 2023

Team data
- Name: Peoria Chiefs (1984–present)
- Previous names: Peoria Suns (1983)
- Colors: Red, navy, white
- Mascot: Homer
- Ballpark: Dozer Park (2002–present)
- Previous parks: Vonachen Stadium (1983–2001)
- Owner/ Operator: Peoria Chiefs Community Baseball LLC
- General manager: Jason Mott
- Manager: Roberto Espinoza
- Website: milb.com/peoria

The Peoria Chiefs are a Minor League Baseball team of the Midwest League and the High-A affiliate of the St. Louis Cardinals. The team was established in 1983 as the Peoria Suns. They are located in Peoria, Illinois, and were named for the Peoria Indian tribe for which the city was named. In 2002, the team replaced the Native American logo associated with the "Chiefs" name with a logo of a cardinal. The logo was changed again in 2005 to a dalmatian depicted as a fire chief. The Chiefs play their home games at Dozer Park, which opened in 2002. They previously played at Vonachen Stadium near Bradley University from 1983 through 2001. The Chiefs have made the playoffs a total of 13 times, through eight wild-card berths, three first-half titles, and two second-half titles.

== History ==
=== Earlier professional baseball in Peoria ===
The history of professional baseball in Peoria dates to the late 19th century. The Peoria Reds, Peoria Canaries, and Peoria Blackbirds played in several early leagues during parts of 1878 to 1895. The first ballpark used by these teams was reportedly called Sylvan Park and was located at the corner of Northeast Glendale Avenue and Spring Street on the location of the present-day St. Augustine Manor. In 1883, the club moved a few blocks toward Peoria Lake, to a facility called Lake View Park, on the southeast corner of Northeast Adams Street and Grant Street, which would remain the home of various Peoria clubs for the next four decades.

The 1895 club was dubbed the Peoria Distillers, referencing the Hiram Walker plant. From 1891 to 1911, Frank E. Murphy from Green Bay, Wisconsin, became involved with baseball, beginning with the purchase of the Peoria team of the Midwest League, which he later renamed the Peoria Hoosiers. That nickname would stick with the various Peoria clubs for the next couple of decades, including their first stretch with the Three-I League from 1905 to 1917. After the resumption of following the peak of American involvement in World War I, the Peoria Tractors name gained favor in 1919, with the growth of the nearby branch of the company later called Caterpillar Inc.

In 1923, the team opened a new ballpark called Woodruff Field in honor of a long-time mayor of Peoria. The new park was just across Grant Street from Lake View Park. The Tractors continued to play in several leagues before folding after the 1937 season. The city was then without professional baseball for the next 15 years. The name Peoria Chiefs first appeared with a new franchise in the Three-I League in 1953. This club disbanded after 1957, and Peoria was again without professional ball, for the next 25 years until the current Chiefs set up shop. The Woodruff Field site is now a softball facility called Woodruff Park.

=== Current franchise ===
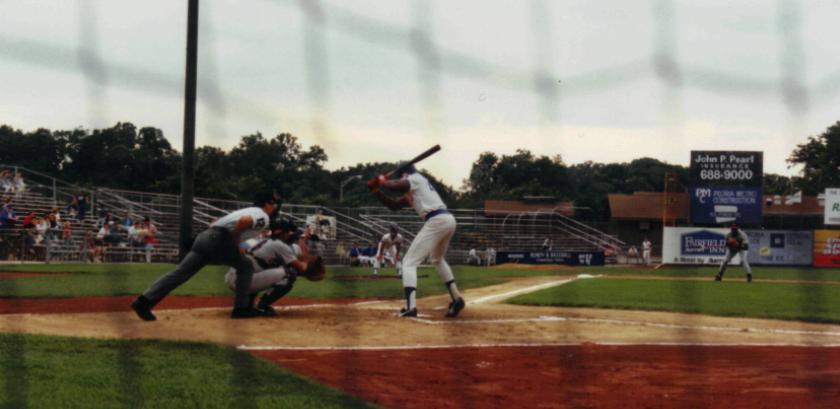
The Chiefs in action in 1990

The Peoria Suns began play in 1983 when the Danville Suns relocated to Peoria from Danville, Illinois. They played their home games at Meinen Field, built in 1968, near the Bradley University campus. The team's name was changed to the Chiefs in 1984. The 1984 team was managed by future Major League Baseball manager Joe Maddon.

The 1988 team, managed by future major league manager Jim Tracy, was the subject of Joseph Bosco's book The Boys Who Would Be Cubs.

Meinen Field was renovated before the 1992 season and renamed Vonachen Stadium in honor of Chiefs owner Pete Vonachen. The team moved to Dozer Park in downtown Peoria on May 24, 2002. During the new park's first year, the team set a franchise attendance record of 254,407 and won the Midwest League championship.

Former Cubs catcher Jody Davis managed the 2006 team.

Baseball Hall of Famer Ryne Sandberg was hired to manage the 2007 Chiefs, which went 71–68 and finished the second half 40–30 in a tie for the division title, but missed the playoff on a tiebreaker. The team set a new season attendance record of 259,794, an average of 3,800 per game. Sandberg returned to manage the Chiefs in 2008. The team set a Midwest League single-game attendance record on July 29, 2008, when the Chiefs drew a crowd of 32,103 to Wrigley Field in Chicago for a game against the Kane County Cougars.

The Chiefs' affiliation with the Cubs ended after the 2012 season, and they entered into a player-development contract with the St. Louis Cardinals.

Under Major League Baseball's restructuring of Minor League Baseball in 2021, the Chiefs were organized into the High-A Central. In 2022, the High-A Central became known as the Midwest League, the name used by the regional circuit before the 2021 reorganization.

The team is owned by Peoria Chiefs Community Baseball LLC.

=== 2008 brawl ===
During a game on July 23, 2008, Dayton Dragons hit three Chiefs batters. The teams played again the following day, and in the first inning, Chiefs pitcher Julio Castillo hit Dragons batter Zack Cozart in the head. Two batters later, Castillo hit Angel Cabrera in the arm, and nearly hit another Dragon player in the head after that. Cabrera then spiked the Chiefs shortstop at second base on a slide. At that point, Chiefs fill-in manager Carmelo Martinez began arguing with the umpire. This brought out the Dragons manager, Donnie Scott, and the two argued for a few minutes before the umpires broke it up.

During the coaches' argument, pitcher Castillo fired a ball at the Dragons' dugout. The ball struck a fan, who was taken to the hospital. Brandon Menchaca proceeded to tackle Castillo from behind as both benches cleared, delaying the game for 69 minutes. After the game, Castillo was arrested for felonious assault. The injured fan, Chris McCarthy, suffered a concussion but recovered.

On August 8, 2009, Castillo was convicted of felonious assault causing serious physical injury and was sentenced to 30 days in jail. In April 2010, a judge released Castillo from probation "on the condition that he leave the United States and not return for a minimum of three years."

== Season-by-season records ==
Season	League	Division	Finish^{[d]}	Wins^{[d]}	Losses^{[d]}	Win%	GB^{[e]}	Postseason	MLB affiliate
Peoria Suns
1983	Midwest League	South	4th	54	85	.388	26	—	California Angels
Peoria Chiefs
1984	Midwest League	South	2nd	66	73	.475	4	—	California Angels
1985	Midwest League	South	1st	75	65	.536	—	Wild Card Berth; Won South Division title vs. Beloit, 2–1; Lost MWL championship vs. Kenosha, 3-1	Chicago Cubs
1986	Midwest League	South	2nd	77	63	.550	10	Wild Card Berth; Won South Division title vs. Springfield, 2–0; Lost MWL championship vs. Waterloo, 2-0	Chicago Cubs
1987	Midwest League	South	2nd	71	69	.507	23	—	Chicago Cubs
1988	Midwest League	South	5th	70	70	.500	17	—	Chicago Cubs
1989	Midwest League	South	2nd	80	59	.576	1	—	Chicago Cubs
1990	Midwest League	South	7th	55	82	.401	34.5	—	Chicago Cubs
1991	Midwest League	South	6th	62	76	.449	18.5	—	Chicago Cubs
1992	Midwest League	South	4th	62	74	.456	28.5	—	Chicago Cubs
1993	Midwest League	South	5th	59	79	.428	23	—	Chicago Cubs
1994	Midwest League	South	2nd	68	70	.493	8.5	—	Chicago Cubs
1995	Midwest League	West	4th	62	72	.463	12.5	—	St. Louis Cardinals
1996	Midwest League	Central	1st	79	57	.581	—	Won Second Half Central Division title Lost quarterfinals vs. Wisconsin, 2-1	St. Louis Cardinals
1997	Midwest League	Central	3rd	70	69	.504	6	—	St. Louis Cardinals
1998	Midwest League	Central	2nd	72	68	.514	1.5	Wild Card Berth; Lost quarterfinals vs. Fort Wayne, 2-1	St. Louis Cardinals
1999	Midwest League	Central	4th	63	76	.453	16	—	St. Louis Cardinals
2000	Midwest League	West	5th	63	74	.460	14.5	—	St. Louis Cardinals
2001	Midwest League	West	6th	57	81	.413	31	—	St. Louis Cardinals
2002	Midwest League	West	1st	85	53	.616	—	Won First Half West Division title Won quarterfinals vs. Burlington, 2–0; Won West Division title vs. Cedar Rapids, 2–0; Won MWL championship vs. Lansing, 3–1	St. Louis Cardinals
2003	Midwest League	West	6th	65	73	.471	14.5	—	St. Louis Cardinals
2004	Midwest League	West	2nd	75	64	.540	8	Wild Card Berth; Lost quarterfinals vs. Kane County, 2-1	St. Louis Cardinals
2005	Midwest League	West	5th	68	72	.486	8.5	—	Chicago Cubs
2006	Midwest League	West	3rd	75	64	.540	4	Won First Half West Division title Lost quarterfinals vs. Beloit, 2-1	Chicago Cubs
2007	Midwest League	West	4th	71	68	.511	7.5	—	Chicago Cubs
2008	Midwest League	West	7th	60	78	.435	18.5	—	Chicago Cubs
2009	Midwest League	West	1st	81	57	.587	—	Won Second Half Central Division title Lost quarterfinals vs. Cedar Rapids, 2–0	Chicago Cubs
2010	Midwest League	West	5th	71	66	.518	11.5	—	Chicago Cubs
2011	Midwest League	West	8th	60	79	.432	22	—	Chicago Cubs
2012	Midwest League	West	7th	63	75	.457	14.5	—	Chicago Cubs
2013	Midwest League	West	4th	68	69	.496	19.5	—	St. Louis Cardinals
2014	Midwest League	West	3rd	72	67	.518	18.5	—	St. Louis Cardinals
2015	Midwest League	West	4th	75	63	.543	13	Wild Card Berth; Won quarterfinals vs. Kane County, 2–0; Lost West Division title vs. Cedar Rapids, 2-0	St. Louis Cardinals
2016	Midwest League	West	3rd	73	66	.525	12.5	Won First Half West Division title Lost quarterfinals vs. Clinton, 2-0	St. Louis Cardinals
2017	Midwest League	West	4th	69	70	.496	10.5	Wild Card Berth; Lost quarterfinals vs. Quad Cities, 2-1	St. Louis Cardinals
2018	Midwest League	West	3rd	76	63	.547	4.5	Wild Card Berth; Won quarterfinals vs. Quad Cities, 2–0; Won West Division title vs. Cedar Rapids, 2–0; Lost MWL championship vs. Bowling Green, 3-1	St. Louis Cardinals
2019	Midwest League	West	8th	54	85	.388	27	—	St. Louis Cardinals
2020	Midwest League	Season cancelled (COVID-19 pandemic)							St. Louis Cardinals
2021	High-A Central	West	6th	45	75	.375	33	—	St. Louis Cardinals
2022	Midwest League	West	5th	56	76	.424	17.5	—	St. Louis Cardinals
2023	Midwest League	West	2nd	69	63	.523	13	Wild Card Berth; Lost West Division Title vs. Cedar Rapids, 2-1	St. Louis Cardinals
2024	Midwest League	West	5th	59	72	.450	18	—	St. Louis Cardinals
2025	Midwest League	West	6th	51	79	.392	22	—	St. Louis Cardinals
Totals	—	—	—	2,806	2,959	.487	—	—	—

== Roster ==
Peoria Chiefs roster
Players	Coaches/Other
Pitchers: 28 Liam Best; 33 Brandon Clarke; 21 Cade Crossland ~; 13 Nate Dohm; 16 Dylan Driessen; 15 Patrick Galle; 47 Brian Holiday; 8 Jack Martinez; 53 Rubén Menes; 25 Jacob Odle; 50 Bobby Olsen; 11 Trey Pooser; 49 Gerardo Salas; 22 Ty Van Dyke; 34 Zeke Wood; 19 Christian Worley; 27 Nelfy Ynfante; Catchers: 35 Alex Birge; 12 Sammy Hernandez; Infielders: 5 Michael Dattalo; 7 Anyelo Encarnación; 29 Jalin Flores; 30 Cade McGee; 36 Yairo Padilla; 54 Brayden Smith; 4 Ryan Weingartner; Outfielders: 32 Tristan Bisseta; 51 Caleb Ferraro; 26 Yordalin Peña; 3 Ian Petrutz; 37 José Suárez; 52 Andrew Williamson	Manager: 18 Roberto Espinoza; Coaches: 55 Jason Eary (bench); 46 Mike Habas (hitting); 47 Michael Oh (pitching); 43 Wade Stauss (assistant); 60-day injured list: -- Frank Elissalt; -- Joseph King; 41 Josh Kross; -- Bruno López; 36 Leonel Sequera; 7-day injured list; * On St. Louis Cardinals 40-man roster; ~ Development list; # Rehab assignment; ∞ Reserve list; ‡ Restricted list; § Suspended list; † Temporarily inactive list; Roster updated August 30, 2026; Transactions; → More rosters: MiLB • Midwest League; → St. Louis Cardinals minor league players

== Notable alumni ==
Baseball Hall of Fame alumni

- Greg Maddux (1985) Inducted, 2013
- Ryne Sandberg (2007–08, MGR) Inducted, 2005

Notable award winning alumni

- Jerome Walton (1987) 1989 NL Rookie of the Year
- Rick Sutcliffe (1991) 1979 NL Rookie of the Year; 1984 NL Cy Young Award (Peoria Chiefs MLB rehab)
- Albert Pujols (2000) 2001 NL Rookie of the Year; 3× NL Most Valuable Player (2005, 2008–2009)
- Yadier Molina (2002) 9× Gold Glove; 10× MLB All-Star
- Nomar Garciaparra (2005) 1997 AL Rookie of the Year (Peoria Chiefs MLB Rehab)
- Kerry Wood (2005, 2007) 1998 NL Rookie of the Year (Peoria Chiefs MLB Rehab)
- Scott Williamson (2006) 1999 NL Rookie of the Year (Peoria Chiefs MLB Rehab)
- Josh Donaldson (2008) 2015 AL Most Valuable Player

Notable alumni

- Wally Joyner (1983) 4× MLB All-Star
- Mark McLemore (1983)
- Devon White (1983) 7× Gold Glove; 3× MLB All-Star
- Joe Maddon (MGR: 1984) 3× Manager of the Year (2008, 2011, 2015); Manager: 2016 World Series Champion Chicago Cubs
- Rafael Palmeiro (1985) 3× Gold Glove; 4× MLB All-Star
- Mark Grace (1986) 3× MLB All-Star
- Joe Girardi (1986) MLB All-Star; Manager: 2009 World Series Champion New York Yankees
- Dwight Smith (1986)
- Derrick May (1987)
- Heathcliff Slocumb (1987, 1989) MLB All-Star
- Steve Trout (1987) (Peoria Chiefs MLB Rehab)
- Rick Wilkins (1988)
- Scott Sanderson (1988) MLB All-Star
- Plácido Polanco (1995) 3× Gold Glove; 2× MLB All-Star
- Cliff Politte (1996)
- Tom Pagnozzi (1998) 2× MLB All-Star (Peoria Chiefs MLB Rehab)
- Rick Ankiel (1998)
- Coco Crisp (2000) 2011 AL Stolen Base Leader
- Jesse Orosco (2000) 2× MLB All-Star; (Peoria Chiefs MLB Rehab)
- JD Drew (2001) MLB All-Star (Peoria Chiefs MLB Rehab)
- Dan Haren (2002) 3× MLB All-Star
- Steve Kline (2002) (Peoria Chiefs MLB Rehab)
- Jason Motte (2003) 2012 NL Saves Leader
- Brendan Ryan (2003)
- Sam Fuld (2005)
- Rich Hill (2005)
- Jody Davis (MGR: 2006) 2× MLB All-Star
- Mark Prior (2006) MLB All-Star (Peoria Chiefs MLB Rehab)
- Jeff Samardzija (2006) MLB All-Star
- Darwin Barney (2007)
- Henry Blanco (2007) (Peoria Chiefs MLB Rehab)
- Welington Castillo (2007)
- Wade Miller (2007) (Peoria Chiefs MLB Rehab)
- Scott Eyre (2008) (Peoria Chiefs MLB Rehab)
- Josh Harrison (2008) 2× MLB All-Star
- Jon Lieber (2008) MLB All-Star
- Chris Archer (2009) 2× MLB All-Star
- Reed Johnson (2009) (Peoria Chiefs MLB Rehab)
- DJ LeMahieu (2009) 3× Gold Glove; 3 MLB All-Star
- Ted Lilly (2009–10) 2× MLB All-Star (Peoria Chiefs MLB Rehab)
- Aramis Ramírez (2009) 3× MLB All-Star (Peoria Chiefs MLB Rehab)
- Carlos Zambrano (2009) 3× MLB All-Star (Peoria Chiefs MLB Rehab)
- Carlos Silva (2010) (Peoria Chiefs MLB Rehab)
- Jake Westbrook (2013) MLB All-Star (Peoria Chiefs MLB Rehab)
- Jon Jay (2015) (Peoria Chiefs MLB Rehab)
- Javier Baez (2012) 2× MLB All-Star
- Patrick Wisdom (2013)
- Alex Reyes (2014) MLB All-Star
- Carson Kelly (2013–14)
- Harrison Bader (2015) Gold Glove Award winner
- Paul DeJong (2015) MLB All-Star
- Jack Flaherty (2015)
- Sandy Alcantara (2016) 2× MLB All-Star, NL Cy Young Award
- Ryan Helsley (2016) MLB All-Star
- Jhonny Peralta (2016) 3× MLB All-Star (Peoria Chiefs MLB Rehab)
- Jordan Hicks (2017)
- Andrew Knizner (2017)
- Dylan Carlson (2017)
- Juan Yepez (2017)
- Tommy Edman (2017) Gold Glove Award winner
- Nolan Gorman (2018–19)
- Lars Nootbaar (2019)
- Brendan Donovan (2019) Gold Glove Award winner
- Alec Burleson (2021)
- Jordan Walker (2021) MLB All-Star
- Masyn Winn (2021-22) Gold Glove Award winner
- Miles Mikolas (2021) 2× MLB All-Star (Peoria Chiefs MLB Rehab)
- Iván Herrera (2021) MLB All-Star
- Pedro Pagés (2021)
- Gordon Graceffo (2022)
- Michael McGreevy (2022)
- Nathan Church (2023)
- Jimmy Crooks (2023)
- Victor Scott II (2023)

== Sources ==
- Benson, Michael (1989). Baseball Parks of North America. Jefferson, North Carolina: McFarland & Co.
- Dinda, J. (2003), Peoria, Illinois, in the Midwest League
- Filichia, Peter (1993). Professional Baseball Franchises. New York: Facts on File Books.
