= Palm Beach Cardinals =

- Founded in 2003; Jupiter, Florida
Team logo
Cap insignia

Minor league affiliations
- Class: Single-A (2021–present)
- Previous classes: Class A-Advanced (2003–2020)
- League: Florida State League (2003–present)
- Division: East Division

Major league affiliations
- Team: St. Louis Cardinals (2003–present)

Minor league titles
- League titles (3): 2005; 2017; 2024
- Division titles (3): 2005; 2017; 2024
- First-half titles (2): 2023; 2024
- Second-half titles (2): 2022; 2024

Team data
- Name: Palm Beach Cardinals (2003–present)
- Colors: Red, navy, white
- Ballpark: Roger Dean Chevrolet Stadium (2003–present)
- Owner(s)/ Operator(s): St. Louis Cardinals / Jupiter Stadium, LTD.
- General manager: Andrew Seymour
- Manager: Rich Benjamin
- Website: milb.com/palm-beach

The Palm Beach Cardinals are a Minor League Baseball team of the Florida State League and the Single-A affiliate of the St. Louis Cardinals. They are located in the town of Jupiter in Palm Beach County, Florida, and play their home games at Roger Dean Chevrolet Stadium. Opened in 1998, the park seats 6,871 people. They share the facility with the Jupiter Hammerheads, also of the Florida State League.

In conjunction with Major League Baseball's restructuring of Minor League Baseball in 2021, the Cardinals were organized into the Low-A Southeast at the Low-A classification. In 2022, the Low-A Southeast became known as the Florida State League, the name historically used by the regional circuit prior to the 2021 reorganization, and was reclassified as a Single-A circuit.

== Season-by-season results ==
| League champions † | Finals appearance * | Division winner ^ | Wild card berth ¤ |

| Year | League | Division | Regular season | | | | | | | | | | Postseason |
| Year | League | Division | 1st half | | | | | 2nd half | | | | | Postseason |
| Year | League | Division | Finish | Wins | Losses | Win% | GB | Finish | Wins | Losses | Win% | GB | Postseason |
|---|---|---|---|---|---|---|---|---|---|---|---|---|---|
| 2003 | FSL | East | 6th | 25 | 43 | .368 | 16 | 5th | 29 | 41 | .414 | 15.5 | |
| 2004 | FSL | East | 3rd | 37 | 32 | .536 | 3 | 2nd | 36 | 29 | .554 | 5.5 | |
| 2005 | FSL | East | 5th | 30 | 40 | .429 | 12 | 1st ^ | 39 | 31 | .557 | — | Won semifinals (Vero Beach) 2–1; Won finals (Lakeland) 3–2 † |
| 2006 | FSL | East | 2nd | 39 | 31 | .557 | 1 | 1st ^ | 36 | 29 | .554 | — | Lost semifinals (St. Lucie) 0–2 |
| 2007 | FSL | East | 2nd | 36 | 34 | .514 | 5.5 | 2nd | 35 | 35 | .500 | 2.5 | |
| 2008 | FSL | East | 1st ^ | 42 | 28 | .600 | — | 4th | 33 | 34 | .493 | 7.5 | Lost semifinals (Daytona) 1–2 |
| 2009 | FSL | South | 5th | 29 | 41 | .414 | 14.5 | 5th | 32 | 36 | .471 | 4.5 | |
| 2010 | FSL | South | 3rd | 39 | 31 | .557 | 4.5 | 4th | 36 | 34 | .514 | 2 | |
| 2011 | FSL | South | 6th | 29 | 40 | .420 | 8.5 | 2nd | 39 | 30 | .565 | 6 | |
| 2012 | FSL | South | 3rd | 31 | 36 | .463 | 17.5 | 3rd | 33 | 36 | .478 | 6.5 | |
| 2013 | FSL | South | 5th | 29 | 39 | .426 | 16.5 | 3rd | 35 | 32 | .522 | 4 | |
| 2014 | FSL | South | 3rd | 36 | 33 | .522 | 5 | 3rd | 40 | 30 | .571 | 3 | |
| 2015 | FSL | South | 6th | 32 | 38 | .457 | 13 | 1st ^ | 43 | 25 | .632 | — | Lost semifinals (Charlotte) 0–2 |
| 2016 | FSL | South | 5th | 32 | 36 | .471 | 6 | 6th | 26 | 43 | .377 | 13.5 | |
| 2017 | FSL | South | 1st ^ | 40 | 27 | .597 | — | 4th | 34 | 33 | .507 | 8 | Won semifinals (Fort Myers) 2–0 †; Co-champions with Dunedin Blue Jays^{[a]} |
| 2018 | FSL | South | 1st ^ | 39 | 25 | .609 | — | 3rd | 36 | 33 | .522 | 4 | Lost semifinals (Fort Myers) 0–2 |
| 2019 | FSL | South | 2nd | 35 | 29 | .547 | 3 | 6th | 22 | 44 | .333 | 23.5 | Postseason canceled due to Hurricane Dorian |
| 2020 | Season cancelled due to the COVID-19 pandemic. | | | | | | | | | | | | |
| 2021 | Low-A Southeast | East | 4th | 37 | 80 | .316 | 24 | In 2021, there was one combined season | | | | | |
| 2022 | FSL | East | 3rd | 30 | 34 | .469 | 9.5 | 1st | 37 | 27 | .578 | — | Lost Semifinal (St. Lucie) 0-2 |
| 2023 | FSL | East | 1st | 37 | 28 | .569 | — | 2nd | 27 | 36 | .435 | 6.0 | Lost Semifinal (Jupiter) 0-2 |
| 2024 | FSL | East | 1st | 37 | 29 | .561 | — | 1st | 46 | 18 | .719 | — | Won semifinals (Daytona) 2–0; Won finals (Lakeland) 2-1 † |
| 2025 | FSL | East | 2nd | 32 | 33 | .492 | 2.0 | 3rd | 31 | 34 | .477 | 12.0 | |

- ^{a} The championship series was canceled due to the impending threat from Hurricane Irma.

| Statistic | Wins | Losses | Win % |
|---|---|---|---|
| All-time regular season record (2003–2021) | 1,478 | 1,477 | .500 |
| Postseason record (2003–2021) | 8 | 15 | .348 |
| All-time regular and postseason record | 1,486 | 1,492 | .499 |

== Roster ==
Palm Beach Cardinals roster
| Players | Coaches/Other |
|---|---|
| Pitchers: 39 Yadiel Batista; 33 Alex Breckheimer; 47 Sam Broderson; 18 Andrew Dutkanych IV; -- Yhoiker Fajardo; 31 Jovi Galvez; 12 Charles Harrison; 28 Yordy Herrera; 44 Hunter Kublick; 11 Bruno Lopez; 32 Bernard Mack; 36 Jacob Odle; 40 Bobby Olsen; 29 Alan Reyes; 46 Leonel Sequera; 15 Nolan Sparks; 38 Tyler Van Dyke; 19 Anthony Watts; 43 Nelfy Ynfante; Catchers: 4 Alex Birge; 41 Heriberto Caraballo; 49 Chase Heath; Infielders: 21 Michael Dattalo; 34 Jalin Flores; 37 Jack Gurevitch; 3 Trevor Haskins; 8 Cade McGee; 13 Jonathan Mejia; 16 Ryan Weingartner; Outfielders: 48 Matthew Miura; 27 Cameron Nickens; 25 Yordalin Pena; 22 Luis Pino; 5 Jose Suarez | Manager: -- Rich Benjamin; Coaches: 7 Yucary De La Cruz (bench); -- Evan Johnson (pitching); -- Rodrigo Vigil (assistant); 7-day injured list; * On St. Louis Cardinals 40-man roster; ~ Development list; # Rehab assignment; ∞ Reserve list; ‡ Restricted list; § Suspended list; † Temporarily inactive list; Roster updated December 22, 2025; Transactions; → More rosters: MiLB • Florida State League; → St. Louis Cardinals minor league players |
