= 2023 St. Louis Cardinals season =

Major League Baseball season

2023 St. Louis Cardinals
- League: National League
- Division: Central
- Ballpark: Busch Stadium
- City: St. Louis, Missouri
- Record: 71–91 (.438)
- Divisional place: 5th
- Owners: William DeWitt Jr.
- General managers: Mike Girsch
- Managers: Oliver Marmol
- Television: Bally Sports Midwest (Chip Caray, Jim Edmonds, Brad Thompson)
- Radio: KMOX NewsRadio 1120; St. Louis Cardinals Radio Network (John Rooney, Rick Horton, Mike Claiborne)
- Stats: ESPN.com; Baseball Reference

The 2023 St. Louis Cardinals season was the 142nd season for the St. Louis Cardinals, a Major League Baseball franchise in St. Louis, Missouri. It was the 132nd season for the Cardinals in the National League and their 18th at Busch Stadium III. They entered the season as the defending NL Central champions. The Cardinals drew an average home attendance of 40,013 in 81 home games in the 2023 MLB season, the 4th highest in the league.

Their 82nd loss on September 15 (65–82) guaranteed their first losing season since 2007 (78–84), after 15 consecutive winning seasons and only their third losing season since 1999 (75–86).

After their 89th loss on September 27, they secured their first last-place finish since 1990 (70–92), with the Pittsburgh Pirates finishing above them in fourth place.

== Previous season ==
The Cardinals finished the 2022 season 93–69, to win the National League Central division title for the first time since 2019. They lost in the Wild Card round to the Philadelphia Phillies. The season also marked the final season for Cardinal legends Albert Pujols and Yadier Molina as both had announced their retirements prior to the season beginning.

== Offseason ==
=== Rule changes ===
Pursuant to the CBA, new rule changes will be in place for the 2023 season:

- institution of a pitch clock between pitches, 15 seconds with no runners on base and 20 seconds with runners;
- limits of two pickoff attempts per plate appearance;
- limits on defensive shifts requiring two infielders to be on either side of second and be within the boundary of the infield; and
- larger bases (increased to 18-inch squares from 15-inch squares);

== Regular season ==
=== Opening Day ===
Opening Day starting lineup
No.	Player	Pos.
Batters
33	Brendan Donovan	2B
21	Lars Nootbaar	LF
46	Paul Goldschmidt	1B
28	Nolan Arenado	3B
40	Willson Contreras	C
27	Tyler O'Neill	CF
16	Nolan Gorman	DH
18	Jordan Walker	RF
19	Tommy Edman	SS
Starting pitcher
39	Miles Mikolas	

=== Summary ===
==== April ====
The Cardinals won the opening series of the season, winning two out of three from the Toronto Blue Jays. However, the Cardinals went on to only win one more series against the Colorado Rockies, and they were swept twice by the Atlanta Braves and Los Angeles Dodgers. On April 4, drama ensued as outfielder Tyler O'Neill was thrown out by Ronald Acuña Jr. at home in a 4–1 loss to Atlanta. After the game, manager Oliver Marmol sharply criticized O'Neill's perceived lack of effort while rounding third base, calling it "unacceptable." Following the public criticism, it was considered that O'Neill might have been trying to avoid injury, as he had dealt with two hamstring injuries in 2022 and at the time of the incident it was drizzling. O'Neill criticized Marmol subtlety, telling media that he did not need to take the issue public and it could have been dealt with behind closed doors. As punishment, Marmol benched O'Neill for the following game.

Highly touted rookie Jordan Walker started his career off with a twelve game hit streak, which tied an MLB record for the longest by a player age 20 or younger to begin his career. Following the end of his hit streak against the Pirates on April 13, Walker cooled down at the plate and with his subpar defensive ability in his new outfield position, he was optioned back to AAA Memphis on April 26.

==== May ====
To start May, the Cardinals were swept at home by the Los Angeles Angels followed by dropping a series against the Detroit Tigers. Following the back-to-back series losses to start the month, the Cardinals announced that first-year catcher Willson Contreras would be removed from the catching role and be exclusively used as a designated hitter. The reason given for this move was to allow Contreras to communicate with the pitching staff and figure out how to work better together.

The Cardinals then started a successful run of baseball, where they won a series against the rival Chicago Cubs at Wrigley Field, followed by a three-game sweep of the Boston Red Sox at Fenway Park. Following the sweep of the Red Sox, the Cardinals announced that Contreras would return to catching duties to start the upcoming home stand. They then returned home to win back to back series, starting with a three-game series against the Milwaukee Brewers and then a four-game series against the Los Angeles Dodgers.

To finish the month, the Cardinals cooled off with a split of a four-game series against the Reds in Cincinnati, followed by dropping a three-game series against the Cleveland Guardians, which was also the Cardinals' first series loss since May 6. The Cardinals ended the month by splitting a two-game series with the Kansas City Royals at home, which involved a Game One loss where Royals pitchers Josh Staumont and Mike Mayers took a perfect game into the 8th inning before being broken up by a Nolan Arenado single.

==== June ====
In June, the Cardinals dropped their first four series, which included falling victim to sweeps by the Pittsburgh Pirates on the road and the San Francisco Giants at home. During this stretch, 2022 All-Star closer Ryan Helsley was also placed on the 15-Day IL with a right forearm strain on June 12, which was followed with the decision to assign Jordan Hicks the closer role. Hicks was one of the few bright spots of the team in June, earning 5 saves in the second half of the month which involved earning saves on three straight days against the New York Mets and Washington Nationals and hitting 104.3 miles per hour. These saves were also the first earned by Hicks since he earned 14 in the 2019 season.

The Cardinals also played the Chicago Cubs in the 2023 London Series as the home team, which involved a two-game series split where the Cubs took game one by a score of 9–1 that involved outfielder Ian Happ hitting two home runs off of starter Adam Wainwright, followed by the Cardinals winning game two by a score of 7–5.

==== July ====
The Cardinals won two of three series before the All-Star Break, in which Nolan Arenado was the sole Cardinal All-Star selection, starting at third base for the National League. Coming out of the All-Star Break, the Cardinals pulled off a six-game win streak which included a sweep of the Miami Marlins at home, their best win streak of the season, before fading at the end of the month and losing the final two of three series of July, both to the Chicago Cubs.

A positive turn for the Cardinals in the month of July however as they fell further out of contention was starting pitcher Steven Matz, who had started the season with a 0–7 record and an ERA around five. In July however Matz found his stride, as he went 5.1 innings scoreless against the Chicago White Sox on July 9 before the All-Star Break. Matz then picked up his first win of the season on July 20 against the Chicago Cubs after going 5.0 innings and surrendering one earned run. Matz followed that start with two consecutive quality starts, going 6.0 innings scoreless against both the Arizona Diamondbacks and Chicago Cubs again, picking up his second win of the year in the start against Chicago. Matz finished the month of July with a 2–0 record and a 2.17 ERA in 29.0 IP in the month.

==== September ====
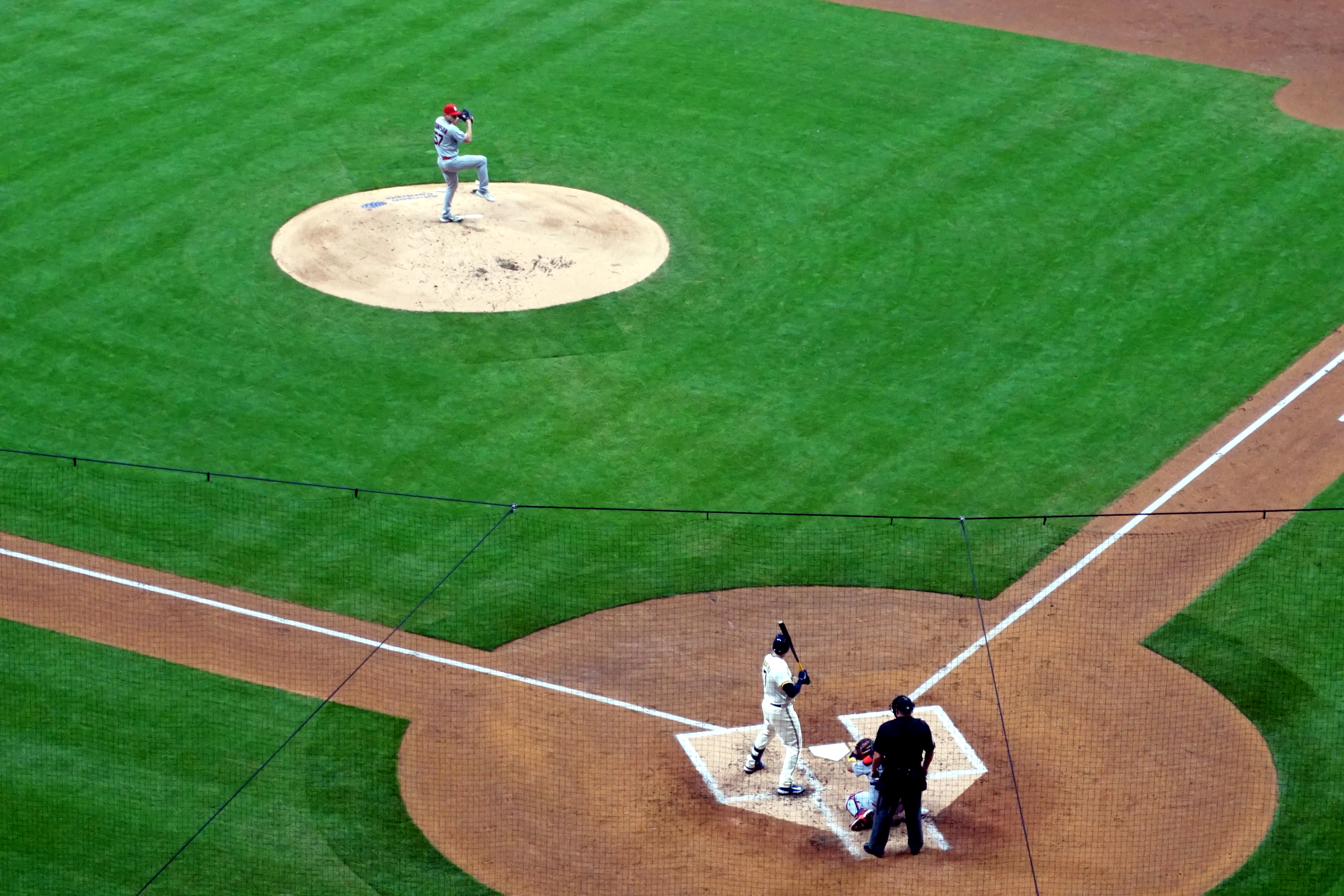
The Cardinals in action at Milwaukee on September 27

On September 18, Adam Wainwright, 42, pitching at home against the division-leading Milwaukee Brewers, won his 200th game, 1-0, pitching seven scoreless innings, giving up only four hits, walking two, striking out three. His 2,202 career strikeouts make him the 66th pitcher to have at least 2,200 strikeouts. His 200 wins make him the 122nd pitcher in baseball history to reach that milestone. His 200 wins, all with the Cardinals, rank him third in the team's history, joining Bob Gibson (251) and Jesse Haines (210).

At home on September 29, Wainwright batted for the first time since October 6, 2021. In the sixth inning with the team trailing 14-2, he pinch-hit for designated hitter Luken Baker. On the second pitch, he grounded out sharply to second base. It was his only at-bat that night. Over his career, he has 10 home runs, 75 RBIs, and a .193 batting average. He has five seasons batting over .200.

In his final game and the team for the season on October 1, Wainwright struck out swinging in the eighth inning, with the team leading 4-3, the final score. Wainwright was 0-for-2 for the season.

=== Game log ===
Legend
Cardinals Win	Cardinals Loss	Game postponed	Eliminated from playoff race
Boldface text denotes a Cardinals pitcher

2023 St. Louis Cardinals Game Log: 71–91 (Home: 35–46; Away: 36–45)
March/April: 10–19 (Home: 5–8; Away: 5–11)

#	Date	Opponent	Score	Win	Loss	Save	Attendance	Record	Box / Streak
1	March 30	Blue Jays	9–10	García (1–0)	**Helsley** (0–1)	Romano (1)	47,649	0–1	L1
2	April 1	Blue Jays	4–1	**Flaherty** (1–0)	Gausman (0–1)	**Helsley** (1)	44,461	1–1	W1
3	April 2	Blue Jays	9–4	**Montgomery** (1–0)	Bassitt (0–1)	—	45,525	2–1	W2
4	April 3	Braves	4–8	Morton (1–0)	**Woodford** (0–1)	—	37,689	2–2	L1
5	April 4	Braves	1–4	Dodd (1–0)	**Matz** (0–1)	Minter (1)	36,501	2–3	L2
6	April 5	Braves	2–5	Elder (1–0)	**Mikolas** (0–1)	Chavez (1)	36,300	2–4	L3
7	April 7	@ Brewers	0–4	Woodruff (1–0)	**Flaherty** (1–1)	—	28,459	2–5	L4
8	April 8	@ Brewers	6–0	**Montgomery** (2–0)	Lauer (1–1)	—	43,077	3–5	W1
9	April 9	@ Brewers	1–6	Peralta (2–0)	**Woodford** (0–2)	—	27,701	3–6	L1
10	April 10	@ Rockies	4–7	Márquez (2–1)	**Matz** (0–2)	—	24,092	3–7	L2
11	April 11	@ Rockies	9–6	**Gallegos** (1–0)	Johnson (0–1)	**Helsley** (2)	25,399	4–7	W1
12	April 12	@ Rockies	7–4	**Pallante** (1–0)	Lawrence (0–1)	**Helsley** (3)	22,250	5–7	W2
13	April 13	Pirates	0–5	Velasquez (1–0)	**Montgomery** (2–1)	—	37,805	5–8	L1
14	April 14	Pirates	3–0	**Thompson** (1–0)	Oviedo (1–1)	**Gallegos** (1)	40,637	6–8	W1
15	April 15	Pirates	3–6 (10)	Bednar (2–0)	**Hicks** (0–1)	Moreta (1)	40,042	6–9	L1
16	April 16	Pirates	5–4 (10)	**VerHagen** (1–0)	Crowe (0–1)	—	40,346	7–9	W1
17	April 17	Diamondbacks	3–6	Kelly (1–2)	**Flaherty** (1–2)	Chafin (3)	36,405	7–10	L1
18	April 18	Diamondbacks	7–8	Nelson (3–0)	**Montgomery** (2–2)	Castro (1)	36,028	7–11	L2
19	April 19	Diamondbacks	14–5	**Woodford** (1–2)	Bumgarner (0–3)	—	39,068	8–11	W1
20	April 21	@ Mariners	2–5	Kirby (2–1)	**Matz** (0–3)	Sewald (5)	29,633	8–12	L1
21	April 22	@ Mariners	4–5	Brash (2–2)	**Thompson** (1–1)	Sewald (6)	38,732	8–13	L2
22	April 23	@ Mariners	7–3	**Flaherty** (2–2)	Flexen (0–4)	—	36,249	9–13	W1
23	April 24	@ Giants	0–4	Cobb (1–1)	**Montgomery** (2–3)	—	20,203	9–14	L1
24	April 25	@ Giants	4–5	Hjelle (1–0)	**Helsley** (0–2)	—	20,797	9–15	L2
25	April 26	@ Giants	3–7	DeSclafani (2–1)	**Hicks** (0–2)	Doval (3)	21,748	9–16	L3
26	April 27	@ Giants	6–0	**Mikolas** (1–1)	Webb (1–5)	—	23,397	10–16	W1
27	April 28	@ Dodgers	3–7	May (3–1)	**Flaherty** (2–3)	—	48,138	10–17	L1
28	April 29	@ Dodgers	0–1	Kershaw (5–1)	**Montgomery** (2–4)	Graterol (2)	48,763	10–18	L2
29	April 30	@ Dodgers	3–6	Syndergaard (1–3)	**Thompson** (1–2)	Phillips (3)	52,304	10–19	L3

May: 15–13 (Home: 7–8; Away: 8–5)

#	Date	Opponent	Score	Win	Loss	Save	Attendance	Record	Box / Streak
30	May 2	Angels	1–5	Sandoval (3–1)	**Matz** (0–4)	—	37,048	10–20	L4
31	May 3	Angels	4–6	Tepera (2–1)	**Gallegos** (1–1)	Estévez (7)	42,148	10–21	L5
32	May 4	Angels	7–11	Canning (2–0)	**Flaherty** (2–4)	—	40,508	10–22	L6
33	May 5	Tigers	4–5	Boyd (2–2)	**Hicks** (0–3)	Lange (6)	36,359	10–23	L7
34	May 6	Tigers	5–6 (10)	Cisnero (2–0)	**Gallegos** (1–2)	—	39,512	10–24	L8
35	May 7	Tigers	12–6	**VerHagen** (2–0)	Englert (1–2)	—	44,465	11–24	W1
36	May 8	@ Cubs	3–1	**Cabrera** (1–0)	Stroman (2–3)	**Helsley** (4)	30,937	12–24	W2
37	May 9	@ Cubs	6–4	**Stratton** (1–0)	Assad (0–2)	**Gallegos** (2)	32,693	13–24	W3
38	May 10	@ Cubs	4–10	Steele (6–0)	**Montgomery** (2–5)	—	36,413	13–25	L1
39	May 12	@ Red Sox	8–6	**Helsley** (1–2)	Jansen (1–1)	—	34,553	14–25	W1
40	May 13	@ Red Sox	4–3	**Pallante** (2–0)	Jansen (1–2)	**Gallegos** (3)	35,935	15–25	W2
41	May 14	@ Red Sox	9–1	**Mikolas** (2–1)	Kluber (2–5)	—	27,732	16–25	W3
42	May 15	Brewers	18–1	**Flaherty** (3–4)	Peralta (4–3)	—	34,548	17–25	W4
43	May 16	Brewers	2–3	Payamps (2–0)	**Montgomery** (2–6)	Williams (6)	34,655	17–26	L1
44	May 17	Brewers	3–0	**Liberatore** (1–0)	Burnes (4–3)	**Helsley** (5)	35,433	18–26	W1
45	May 18	Dodgers	16–8	**Wainwright** (1–0)	Urías (5–4)	—	36,982	19–26	W2
46	May 19	Dodgers	0–5	Gonsolin (2–1)	**Matz** (0–5)	—	44,774	19–27	L1
47	May 20	Dodgers	6–5	**Helsley** (2–2)	González (1–1)	**Gallegos** (4)	45,177	20–27	W1
48	May 21	Dodgers	10–5	**VerHagen** (3–0)	Kershaw (6–4)	—	44,721	21–27	W2
49	May 22	@ Reds	5–6 (10)	Gibaut (4–1)	**Helsley** (2–3)	—	9,194	21–28	L1
50	May 23	@ Reds	8–5	**Wainwright** (2–0)	Ashcraft (2–3)	**Helsley** (6)	14,159	22–28	W1
51	May 24	@ Reds	3–10	Lively (2–2)	**Matz** (0–6)	—	12,626	22–29	L1
52	May 25	@ Reds	2–1	**Mikolas** (3–1)	Sims (1–1)	**Gallegos** (5)	15,978	23–29	W1
53	May 26	@ Guardians	3–4	Bieber (4–3)	**Liberatore** (1–1)	Clase (17)	31,303	23–30	L1
54	May 27	@ Guardians	2–1 (10)	**Helsley** (3–3)	Sandlin (2–2)	**Gallegos** (6)	32,224	24–30	W1
55	May 28	@ Guardians	3–4	Curry (1–0)	**Helsley** (3–4)	—	27,398	24–31	L1
56	May 29	Royals	0–7	Mayers (1–0)	**Wainwright** (2–1)	—	45,911	24–32	L2
57	May 30	Royals	2–1	**Mikolas** (4–1)	Hernández (0–2)	**Gallegos** (7)	38,406	25–32	W1

June: 8–15 (Home: 3–8; Away: 5–7)

#	Date	Opponent	Score	Win	Loss	Save	Attendance	Record	Box / Streak
58	June 2	@ Pirates	5–7	Ramírez (1–0)	**Gallegos** (1–3)	Bednar (11)	24,388	25–33	L1
59	June 3	@ Pirates	3–4	Moreta (3–1)	**Montgomery** (2–7)	Bednar (12)	29,161	25–34	L2
60	June 4	@ Pirates	1–2	Hill (5–5)	**Mikolas** (4–2)	Bednar (13)	22,947	25–35	L3
61	June 5	@ Rangers	3–4	Smith (1–2)	**Cabrera** (1–1)	—	25,161	25–36	L4
62	June 6	@ Rangers	4–6	Dunning (5–1)	**Liberatore** (1–2)	Smith (11)	28,151	25–37	L5
63	June 7	@ Rangers	1–0	**Hicks** (1–3)	Gray (6–2)	**Helsley** (7)	30,251	26–37	W1
64	June 9	Reds	7–4	**Montgomery** (3–7)	Lively (3–4)	**Gallegos** (8)	43,238	27–37	W2
65	June 10	Reds	4–8	Abbott (2–0)	**Mikolas** (4–3)	—	45,246	27–38	L1
66	June 11	Reds	3–4	Gibaut (6–1)	**Hicks** (1–4)	Díaz (15)	42,445	27–39	L2
67	June 12	Giants	3–4	Webb (5–6)	**Stratton** (1–1)	Doval (17)	40,886	27–40	L3
68	June 13	Giants	3–11	Jackson (1–0)	**Flaherty** (3–5)	Winn (1)	40,917	27–41	L4
69	June 14	Giants	5–8 (10)	Rogers (1–4)	**Matz** (0–7)	Doval (18)	39,165	27–42	L5
70	June 16	@ Mets	1–6	Megill (6–4)	**Mikolas** (4–4)	—	33,948	27–43	L6
71	June 17	@ Mets	5–3	**Wainwright** (3–1)	Senga (6–4)	**Hicks** (1)	39,143	28–43	W1
72	June 18	@ Mets	8–7	**VerHagen** (4–0)	Ottavino (0–3)	**Hicks** (2)	43,110	29–43	W2
73	June 19	@ Nationals	8–6	**Flaherty** (4–5)	Gray (4–6)	**Hicks** (3)	19,997	30–43	W3
74	June 20	@ Nationals	9–3	**Montgomery** (4–7)	Gore (3–6)	—	22,223	31–43	W4
75	June 21	@ Nationals	0–3	Williams (4–4)	**Mikolas** (4–5)	Harvey (4)	16,191	31–44	L1
76	June 24†	Cubs	1–9	Steele (8–2)	**Wainwright** (3–2)	—	54,662	31–45	L2
77	June 25†	Cubs	7–5	**Woodford** (2–2)	Stroman (9–5)	**Hicks** (4)	55,565	32–45	W1
78	June 27	Astros	4–2	**Montgomery** (5–7)	Valdez (7–6)	**Hicks** (5)	41,512	33–45	W2
79	June 28	Astros	7–10	Martinez (2–3)	**Gallegos** (1–4)	Pressly (15)	41,452	33–46	L1
80	June 29	Astros	0–14	France (3–3)	**Wainwright** (3–3)	—	42,504	33–47	L2
—	June 30	Yankees	Postponed (inclement weather); Makeup: July 1						
†The Cardinals were the home team against the Cubs in a two-game series at London Stadium in the 2023 MLB London Series.

July: 14–13 (Home: 8–5; Away: 6–8)

#	Date	Opponent	Score	Win	Loss	Save	Attendance	Record	Box / Streak
81	July 1 (1)	Yankees	11–4	**Flaherty** (5–5)	Severino (1–3)	—	44,237	34–47	W1
82	July 1 (2)	Yankees	2–6	King (2–4)	**Liberatore** (1–3)	—	44,846	34–48	L1
83	July 2	Yankees	5–1	**Montgomery** (6–7)	Cole (8–2)	—	44,676	35–48	W1
84	July 3	@ Marlins	4–5	Brazobán (3–1)	**Pallante** (2–1)	Puk (14)	19,638	35–49	L1
85	July 4	@ Marlins	2–15	Luzardo (7–5)	**Wainwright** (3–4)	—	16,437	35–50	L2
86	July 5	@ Marlins	9–10	Puk (4–2)	**Hicks** (1–5)	—	9,911	35–51	L3
87	July 6	@ Marlins	3–0	**Flaherty** (6–5)	Pérez (5–3)	**Hicks** (6)	8,763	36–51	W1
88	July 7	@ White Sox	7–8	Middleton (2–0)	**Leahy** (0–1)	Graveman (7)	27,569	36–52	L1
89	July 8	@ White Sox	3–0	**Mikolas** (5–5)	Toussaint (0–2)	**Hicks** (7)	26,560	37–52	W1
90	July 9	@ White Sox	4–3 (10)	**Romero** (1–0)	Middleton (2–1)	—	29,769	38–52	W2
**93rd All-Star Game in Seattle, Washington**
—	July 14	Nationals	Suspended (rain); Resuming: July 15th						
91	July 15 (1)	Nationals	5–7 (10)	Finnegan (4–3)	**Hicks** (1–6)	Harvey (9)	42,042	38–53	L1
92	July 15 (2)	Nationals	9–6	**Hudson** (1–0)	Willingham (0–1)	—	41,900	39–53	W1
93	July 16	Nationals	8–4	**Flaherty** (7–5)	Gray (6–8)	—	42,626	40–53	W2
94	July 17	Marlins	6–4	**Mikolas** (6–5)	Floro (3–5)	**Hicks** (8)	35,619	41–53	W3
95	July 18	Marlins	5–2 (10)	**Romero** (2–0)	Puk (4–4)	—	38,490	42–53	W4
96	July 19	Marlins	6–4	**Thompson** (2–2)	Alcántara (3–9)	**Stratton** (1)	35,906	43–53	W5
97	July 20	@ Cubs	7–2	**Matz** (1–7)	Stroman (10–7)	—	34,251	44–53	W6
98	July 21	@ Cubs	3–4	Steele (10–3)	**Flaherty** (7–6)	Alzolay (8)	38,819	44–54	L1
99	July 22	@ Cubs	6–8	Palencia (2–0)	**Thompson** (2–3)	Alzolay (9)	40,425	44–55	L2
100	July 23	@ Cubs	2–7	Taillon (4–6)	**Montgomery** (6–8)	—	38,223	44–56	L3
101	July 24	@ Diamondbacks	10–6	**Gallegos** (2–4)	Chafin (2–3)	—	23,184	45–56	W1
102	July 25	@ Diamondbacks	1–3	Nelson (5–2)	**Romero** (2–1)	Ginkel (3)	23,572	45–57	L1
103	July 26	@ Diamondbacks	11–7	**Pallante** (3–1)	Gallen (11–5)	—	22,457	46–57	W1
104	July 27	Cubs	3–10	Steele (11–3)	**Mikolas** (6–6)	—	44,584	46–58	L1
105	July 28	Cubs	2–3	Smyly (8–7)	**Montgomery** (6–9)	Alzolay (12)	43,424	46–59	L2
106	July 29	Cubs	1–5	Taillon (5–6)	**Wainwright** (3–5)	—	44,877	46–60	L3
107	July 30	Cubs	3–0	**Matz** (2–7)	Hendricks (4–5)	**Romero** (1)	43,670	47–60	W1

August: 11–16 (Home: 7–9; Away: 4–7)

#	Date	Opponent	Score	Win	Loss	Save	Attendance	Record	Box / Streak
108	August 1	Twins	2–3	López (6–6)	**Mikolas** (6–7)	Durán (18)	37,162	47–61	L1
109	August 2	Twins	7–3	**Hudson** (2–0)	Ryan (9–8)	—	34,332	48–61	W1
110	August 3	Twins	3–5	Gray (5–4)	**Liberatore** (1–4)	Durán (19)	36,949	48–62	L1
111	August 4	Rockies	4–9	Flexen (1–5)	**Wainwright** (3–6)	—	38,559	48–63	L2
112	August 5	Rockies	6–2	**Matz** (3–7)	Blach (1–1)	—	38,121	49–63	W1
113	August 6	Rockies	0–1	Gomber (9–8)	**Thompson** (2–4)	Lawrence (9)	40,051	49–64	L1
114	August 8	@ Rays	2–4	Adam (3–2)	**Mikolas** (6–8)	Fairbanks (15)	15,522	49–65	L2
115	August 9	@ Rays	6–4	**Hudson** (3–0)	Kelly (4–2)	**Gallegos** (9)	11,203	50–65	W1
116	August 10	@ Rays	5–2	**Liberatore** (2–4)	Littell (2–3)	—	11,990	51–65	W2
117	August 11	@ Royals	8–12	Zerpa (1–1)	**Wainwright** (3–7)	—	26,271	51–66	L1
118	August 12	@ Royals	5–4	**Matz** (4–7)	Ragans (3–4)	**Romero** (2)	37,016	52–66	W1
119	August 14	Athletics	7–5	**Romero** (3–1)	Felipe (1–1)	—	34,793	53–66	W2
120	August 15	Athletics	6–2	**Hudson** (4–0)	Watkins (0–1)	—	32,528	54–66	W3
121	August 16	Athletics	0–8	Blackburn (3–3)	**Liberatore** (2–5)	—	33,146	54–67	L1
122	August 17	Mets	2–4	Quintana (1–4)	**Wainwright** (3–8)	Gott (1)	36,155	54–68	L2
123	August 18	Mets	1–7	Lucchesi (2–0)	**Thompson** (2–5)	—	42,076	54–69	L3
124	August 19	Mets	2–13	Senga (10–6)	**Mikolas** (6–9)	—	40,303	54–70	L4
125	August 20	Mets	7–3	**Hudson** (5–0)	Carrasco (3–7)	—	37,470	55–70	W1
126	August 21	@ Pirates	1–11	Falter (1–7)	**Rom** (0–1)	—	12,270	55–71	L1
127	August 22	@ Pirates	3–6	Oviedo (7–13)	**Wainwright** (3–9)	Bednar (27)	11,823	55–72	L2
128	August 23	@ Pirates	6–4	**Thompson** (3–5)	Ortiz (2–4)	**Romero** (3)	11,504	56–72	W1
129	August 25	@ Phillies	2–7	Sánchez (2–3)	**Mikolas** (6–10)	—	34,118	56–73	L1
130	August 26	@ Phillies	1–12	Wheeler (10–6)	**Hudson** (5–1)	—	44,097	56–74	L2
131	August 27	@ Phillies	0–3	Nola (12–8)	**Rom** (0–2)	Kimbrel (20)	41,141	56–75	L3
132	August 28	Padres	1–4	Snell (11–9)	**Wainwright** (3–10)	Hader (28)	35,917	56–76	L4
133	August 29	Padres	6–5 (10)	**Romero** (4–1)	Hader (0–2)	—	36,851	57–76	W1
134	August 30	Padres	5–4	**Pallante** (4–1)	Hader (0–3)	—	32,583	58–76	W2

September/October: 13–15 (Home: 5–8; Away: 8–7)

#	Date	Opponent	Score	Win	Loss	Save	Attendance	Record	Box / Streak
135	September 1	Pirates	2–4 (10)	Selby (2–0)	**Romero** (4–2)	Bednar (30)	33,842	58–77	L1
136	September 2	Pirates	6–7	Bolton (1–0)	**VerHagen** (4–1)	Bednar (31)	38,276	58–78	L2
137	September 3	Pirates	6–4	**Thompson** (4–5)	Oviedo (8–14)	**Gallegos** (10)	35,856	59–78	W1
138	September 5	@ Braves	10–6	**Mikolas** (7–10)	Soroka (2–2)	—	33,553	60–78	W2
139	September 6	@ Braves	11–6	**Hudson** (6–1)	Strider (16–5)	—	35,514	61–78	W3
140	September 7	@ Braves	5–8	Fried (7–1)	**Wainwright** (3–11)	—	34,349	61–79	L1
141	September 8	@ Reds	9–4	**Liberatore** (3–5)	Abbott (8–5)	—	29,870	62–79	W1
142	September 9	@ Reds	4–3	**Thompson** (5–5)	Moll (1–4)	**Helsley** (8)	40,810	63–79	W2
143	September 10	@ Reds	1–7	Greene (4–6)	**Mikolas** (7–11)	—	31,190	63–80	L1
144	September 11	@ Orioles	5–11	Hall (1–0)	**Hudson** (6–2)	—	15,485	63–81	L2
145	September 12	@ Orioles	5–2	**Wainwright** (4–11)	Means (0–1)	**Helsley** (9)	15,526	64–81	W1
146	September 13	@ Orioles	1–0	**Rom** (1–2)	Gibson (14–9)	**Helsley** (10)	14,442	65–81	W2
147	September 15	Phillies	4–5	Strahm (9–4)	**Thompson** (5–6)	Alvarado (8)	42,166	65–82	L1
148	September 16	Phillies	1–6	Suárez (3–6)	**Mikolas** (7–12)	—	42,817	65–83	L2
149	September 17	Phillies	6–5	**King** (2–1)	Domínguez (4–5)	**Helsley** (11)	40,996	66–83	W1
150	September 18	Brewers	1–0	**Wainwright** (5–11)	Peralta (12–9)	**Helsley** (12)	33,176	67–83	W2
151	September 19	Brewers	3–7	Rea (6–6)	**Rom** (1–3)	—	35,760	67–84	L1
152	September 20	Brewers	2–8	Houser (7–4)	**Thompson** (5–7)	—	37,008	67–85	L2
153	September 21	Brewers	0–6	Miley (9–4)	**Mikolas** (7–13)	—	37,105	67–86	L3
154	September 22	@ Padres	2–4	Suárez (4–2)	**Liberatore** (3–6)	—	42,983	67–87	L4
155	September 23	@ Padres	5–2 (11)	**Lawrence** (1–0)	Barlow (2–5)	—	42,525	68–87	W1
156	September 24	@ Padres	2–12	Wacha (13–4)	**Rom** (1–4)	—	42,505	68–88	L1
157	September 26	@ Brewers	4–1	**Mikolas** (8–13)	Houser (7–5)	**Helsley** (13)	36,755	69–88	W1
158	September 27	@ Brewers	2–3	Payamps (7–5)	**Barnes** (0–1)	Williams (36)	31,256	69–89	L1
159	September 28	@ Brewers	0–3	Teherán (3–5)	**Hudson** (6–3)	Small (1)	29,185	69–90	L2
160	September 29	Reds	2–19	Williamson (5–5)	**Woodford** (2–3)	Spiers (1)	38,964	69–91	L3
161	September 30	Reds	15–6	**VerHagen** (5–1)	Phillips (1–1)	—	39,923	70–91	W1
162	October 1	Reds	4–3	**Mikolas** (9–13)	Greene (4–7)	**Helsley** (14)	44,614	71–91	W2

== Season standings ==
=== National League Central ===
NL Central
Team	W	L	Pct.	GB	Home	Road
Milwaukee Brewers	92	70	.568	—	49‍–‍32	43‍–‍38
Chicago Cubs	83	79	.512	9	45‍–‍36	38‍–‍43
Cincinnati Reds	82	80	.506	10	38‍–‍43	44‍–‍37
Pittsburgh Pirates	76	86	.469	16	39‍–‍42	37‍–‍44
St. Louis Cardinals	71	91	.438	21	35‍–‍46	36‍–‍45

=== National League Wild Card ===
Division leaders
Team	W	L	Pct.
Atlanta Braves	104	58	.642
Los Angeles Dodgers	100	62	.617
Milwaukee Brewers	92	70	.568

Wild Card teams (Top 3 teams qualify for postseason)
Team	W	L	Pct.	GB
Philadelphia Phillies	90	72	.556	+6
Miami Marlins	84	78	.519	—
Arizona Diamondbacks	84	78	.519	—
Chicago Cubs	83	79	.512	1
San Diego Padres	82	80	.506	2
Cincinnati Reds	82	80	.506	2
San Francisco Giants	79	83	.488	5
Pittsburgh Pirates	76	86	.469	8
New York Mets	75	87	.463	9
St. Louis Cardinals	71	91	.438	13
Washington Nationals	71	91	.438	13
Colorado Rockies	59	103	.364	25

=== Record vs. opponents ===
==== Record vs. National League ====
2023 National League record Source: MLB Standings Grid – 2023
Team	AZ	ATL	CHC	CIN	COL	LAD	MIA	MIL	NYM	PHI	PIT	SD	SF	STL	WSH	AL
Arizona	—	3–3	6–1	3–4	10–3	5–8	2–4	4–2	1–6	3–4	4–2	7–6	7–6	3–3	5–1	21–25
Atlanta	3–3	—	4–2	5–1	7–0	4–3	9–4	5–1	10–3	8–5	4–3	3–4	4–2	4–2	8–5	26–20
Chicago	1–6	2–4	—	6–7	4–2	3–4	2–4	6–7	3–3	1–5	10–3	4–3	5–1	8–5	3–4	25–21
Cincinnati	4–3	1–5	7–6	—	4–2	4–2	3–3	3–10	4–2	3–4	5–8	3–3	3–4	6–7	4–3	28–18
Colorado	3–10	0–7	2–4	2–4	—	3–10	5–2	4–2	4–2	2–5	2–4	4–9	4–9	3–3	3–4	18–28
Los Angeles	8–5	3–4	4–3	2–4	10–3	—	3–3	5–1	3–3	4–2	4–3	9–4	7–6	4–3	4–2	30–16
Miami	4–2	4–9	4–2	3–3	2–5	3–3	—	3–4	4–8	7–6	5–2	2–4	3–3	3–4	11–2	26–20
Milwaukee	2–4	1–5	7–6	10–3	2–4	1–5	4–3	—	6–1	4–2	8–5	6–1	2–5	8–5	3–3	28–18
New York	6–1	3–10	3–3	2–4	2–4	3–3	8–4	1–6	—	6–7	3–3	3–3	4–3	4–3	7–6	19–27
Philadelphia	4–3	5–8	5–1	4–3	5–2	2–4	6–7	2–4	7–6	—	3–3	5–2	2–4	5–1	7–6	28–18
Pittsburgh	2–4	3–4	3–10	8–5	4–2	3–4	2–5	5–8	3–3	3–3	—	5–1	2–4	9–4	5–2	19–27
San Diego	6–7	4–3	3–4	3–3	9–4	4–9	4–2	1–6	3–3	2–5	1–5	—	8–5	3–3	3–3	28–18
San Francisco	6–7	2–4	1–5	4–3	9–4	6–7	3–3	5–2	3–4	4–2	4–2	5–8	—	6–1	1–5	20–26
St. Louis	3–3	2–4	5–8	7–6	3–3	3–4	4–3	5–8	3–4	1–5	4–9	3–3	1–6	—	4–2	23–23
Washington	1–5	5–8	4–3	3–4	4–3	2–4	2–11	3–3	6–7	6–7	2–5	3–3	5–1	2–4	—	23–23

Updated with the results of all games through October 1, 2023.

==== Record vs. American League ====
2023 National League record vs. American League Source: MLB Standings
Team	BAL	BOS	CWS	CLE	DET	HOU	KC	LAA	MIN	NYY	OAK	SEA	TB	TEX	TOR
Arizona	1–2	1–2	2–1	2–1	3–0	0–3	2–1	2–1	0–3	1–2	2–1	1–2	1–2	3–1	0–3
Atlanta	2–1	1–3	1–2	2–1	2–1	0–3	3–0	2–1	3–0	3–0	1–2	2–1	2–1	2–1	0–3
Chicago	2–1	1–2	3–1	1–2	2–1	0–3	2–1	0–3	1–2	2–1	3–0	2–1	2–1	2–1	2–1
Cincinnati	2–1	2–1	1–2	2–2	2–1	3–0	3–0	3–0	1–2	0–3	2–1	2–1	1–2	3–0	1–2
Colorado	1–2	2–1	2–1	2–1	1–2	1–3	2–1	2–1	1–2	2–1	1–2	0–3	0–3	0–3	1–2
Los Angeles	2–1	2–1	2–1	2–1	2–1	2–1	1–2	4–0	2–1	1–2	3–0	3–0	1–2	2–1	1–2
Miami	0–3	3–0	2–1	2–1	2–1	1–2	3–0	3–0	2–1	2–1	3–0	1–2	1–3	0–3	1–2
Milwaukee	2–1	1–2	3–0	2–1	1–2	2–1	3–0	2–1	2–2	2–1	0–3	3–0	1–2	3–0	1–2
New York	0–3	1–2	2–1	3–0	0–3	1–2	0–3	1–2	1–2	2–2	3–0	2–1	2–1	1–2	0–3
Philadelphia	2–1	1–2	2–1	1–2	3–0	2–1	2–1	2–1	1–2	1–2	3–0	2–1	3–0	0–3	3–1
Pittsburgh	1–2	3–0	2–1	1–2	2–2	1–2	3–0	1–2	1–2	1–2	1–2	1–2	0–3	1–2	0–3
San Diego	2–1	1–2	3–0	2–1	2–1	1–2	1–2	3–0	1–2	1–2	3–0	1–3	2–1	3–0	2–1
San Francisco	1–2	2–1	2–1	2–1	0–3	2–1	1–2	1–2	2–1	1–2	2–2	1–2	1–2	1–2	1–2
St. Louis	2–1	3–0	2–1	1–2	1–2	1–2	2–2	0–3	1–2	2–1	2–1	1–2	2–1	1–2	2–1
Washington	0–4	2–1	2–1	1–2	2–1	1–2	2–1	1–2	2–1	2–1	3–0	2–1	0–3	2–1	1–2

Updated with the results of all games through October 1, 2023.

== Roster ==
2023 St. Louis Cardinals
Roster
Pitchers: 61 Jacob Barnes; 92 Génesis Cabrera; 22 Jack Flaherty; 65 Giovanny Gallegos; 56 Ryan Helsley; 12 Jordan Hicks; 43 Dakota Hudson; 47 John King; 72 Casey Lawrence; 64 Kyle Leahy; 52 Matthew Liberatore; 32 Steven Matz; 39 Miles Mikolas; 47 Jordan Montgomery; 68 James Naile; 70 Packy Naughton; 53 Andre Pallante; 38 Drew Rom; 59 JoJo Romero; 30 Chris Stratton; 31 Andrew Suárez; 38 Ryan Tepera; 57 Zack Thompson; 34 Drew VerHagen; 50 Adam Wainwright; 44 Jake Woodford; 60 Guillermo Zuñiga	Catchers: 63 Tres Barrera; 40 Willson Contreras; 48 Iván Herrera; 7 Andrew Knizner; Infielders: 28 Nolan Arenado; 26 Luken Baker; 11 Paul DeJong; 33 Brendan Donovan; 19 Tommy Edman; 35 José Fermín; 46 Paul Goldschmidt; 16 Nolan Gorman; 55 Irving Lopez; 55 Taylor Motter; 62 Juniel Querecuto; 0 Masyn Winn	Outfielders: 41 Alec Burleson; 3 Dylan Carlson; 54 Óscar Mercado; 21 Lars Nootbaar; 27 Tyler O'Neill; 67 Richie Palacios; 63 Michael Siani; 18 Jordan Walker; 13 Juan Yepez	Manager: 37 Oliver Marmol; Coaches: 87 Brandon Allen (assistant hitting); 90 Dusty Blake (pitching); 82 Stubby Clapp (first base); 88 Packy Elkins (game planning); 77 Joe McEwing (bench); 51 Willie McGee (assistant coach); 94 Jamie Pogue (bullpen catcher/assistant coach/bullpen); 74 Julio Rangel (assistant pitching/bullpen); 76 Kleininger Teran (bullpen catcher); 49 Turner Ward (hitting); 75 Ron 'Pop' Warner (third base)

== Player statistics ==
= Indicates team leader

= Indicates league leader

=== Batting ===
Note: G = Games played; AB = At bats; R = Runs; H = Hits; 2B = Doubles; 3B = Triples; HR = Home runs; RBI = Runs batted in; SB = Stolen bases; BB = Walks; SO = Strikeouts; AVG = Batting average; OBP = On-base percentage; SLG = Slugging percentage
* = bats left-handed
# = bats both (switch-hitter)
TEAM .742 OPS (On-base + Slugging percentages; 6th of 15 NL teams), 101 OPS+ (adjusted for the team's ballpark)

Player	G	AB	R	H	2B	3B	HR	RBI	SB	BB	SO	AVG	OBP	SLG
Paul Goldschmidt	154	593	89	159	31	0	25	80	11	87	161	.268	.363	.447
Nolan Arenado	144	560	71	149	26	2	26	93	3	41	101	.266	.315	.459
Tommy Edman#	137	479	69	119	25	4	13	47	27	35	84	.248	.307	.399
Willson Contreras	125	428	55	113	27	0	20	67	6	51	111	.264	.358	.467
Lars Nootbaar*	117	426	74	111	23	1	14	46	11	72	99	.261	.367	.418
Jordan Walker	117	420	51	116	19	2	16	51	7	37	104	.276	.342	.445
Nolan Gorman*	119	406	59	96	17	0	27	76	7	53	148	.236	.328	.478
Brendan Donovan*	95	327	48	93	10	1	11	34	5	33	53	.284	.365	.422
Alec Burleson*	107	315	34	77	20	1	8	36	3	23	45	.244	.300	.390
Paul DeJong	81	279	38	65	11	0	13	32	4	21	87	.233	.297	.412
Tyler O'Neill	72	238	27	55	14	0	9	21	5	28	67	.231	.312	.403
Andrew Knizner	70	224	30	54	11	0	10	31	2	12	62	.241	.288	.424
Dylan Carlson#	76	219	27	48	8	1	5	27	3	26	49	.219	.318	.333
Masyn Winn	37	122	8	21	2	0	2	12	2	10	26	.172	.230	.238
Richie Palacios*	32	93	9	24	6	0	6	16	2	6	11	.258	.307	.516
Luken Baker	33	86	9	18	3	0	2	10	0	13	31	.209	.313	.314
Taylor Motter	29	76	3	13	3	0	0	2	0	5	31	.171	.232	.211
Juan Yepez	28	60	5	11	1	0	2	2	0	4	20	.183	.246	.300
José Fermín	21	51	5	12	1	0	0	4	0	6	8	.235	.339	.255
Iván Herrera	13	37	6	11	2	0	0	4	0	5	11	.297	.409	.351
Óscar Mercado	20	31	3	9	3	0	0	5	2	1	4	.290	.313	.387
Juniel Querecuto#	9	20	2	2	1	0	0	0	0	1	6	.100	.143	.150
Irving Lopez*	5	11	0	0	0	0	0	1	0	0	5	.000	.000	.000
Michael Siani*	5	5	0	0	0	0	0	0	1	0	1	.000	.000	.000
Tres Barrera	6	2	0	0	0	0	0	0	0	0	0	.000	.000	.000
Adam Wainright	2	2	0	0	0	0	0	0	0	0	1	.000	.000	.000
Player	G	AB	R	H	2B	3B	HR	RBI	SB	BB	SO	AVG	OBP	SLG
Totals	162	5,510	719	1,376	264	12	209	697	101	570	1,326	.250	.326	.416
Rank in NL	—	5	10	7	11	15	5	8	12	4	6	7	7	6

=== Pitching ===
Note: W = Wins; L = Losses; ERA = Earned run average; G = Games pitched; GS = Games started; SV = Saves; IP = Innings pitched; H = Hits allowed; R = Runs allowed; ER = Earned runs allowed; HR = Home runs allowed; BB = Walks allowed; SO = Strikeouts; WHIP = Walks plus hits per inning pitched
* = throws left-handed
TEAM BF = 6,273; ERA+ = 90

Player	W	L	ERA	G	GS	SV	IP	H	R	ER	HR	BB	SO	WHIP
Miles Mikolas	9	13	4.78	35	35	0	201.1	226	110	107	26	39	137	1.32
Jordan Montgomery*	6	9	3.42	21	21	0	121.0	116	54	46	12	35	108	1.25
Jack Flaherty	7	6	4.43	20	20	0	109.2	116	56	54	10	54	106	1.55
Steven Matz*	4	7	3.86	25	17	0	105.0	108	48	45	9	32	98	1.33
Adam Wainwright	5	11	7.40	21	21	0	101.0	151	89	83	20	41	55	1.90
Dakota Hudson	6	3	4.98	18	12	0	81.1	88	46	45	9	34	45	1.50
Andre Pallante	4	1	4.76	62	0	0	68.0	76	37	36	6	30	43	1.56
Zack Thompson*	5	7	4.48	25	9	0	66.1	69	35	33	8	25	72	1.42
Matthew Liberatore*	3	6	5.25	22	11	0	61.2	66	42	36	5	25	46	1.48
Drew VerHagen	5	1	3.98	60	0	0	61.0	52	30	27	9	26	60	1.28
Giovanny Gallegos	2	4	4.42	56	0	10	55.0	54	28	27	11	12	59	1.20
Chris Stratton	1	1	4.19	42	0	1	53.2	45	28	25	4	17	59	1.16
Jake Woodford	2	3	6.23	15	8	0	47.2	61	34	33	11	22	29	1.74
Jordan Hicks	1	6	3.67	40	0	8	41.2	39	21	17	2	24	59	1.51
Ryan Helsley	3	4	2.45	33	0	14	36.2	22	11	10	1	17	52	1.06
JoJo Romero*	4	2	3.68	27	0	3	36.2	29	17	15	1	10	42	1.06
Drew Rom*	1	4	8.02	8	8	0	33.2	51	34	30	7	19	32	2.08
Génesis Cabrera*	1	1	5.06	32	0	0	32.0	32	18	18	6	18	38	1.56
Andrew Suárez*	0	0	7.16	13	0	0	27.2	33	27	22	7	15	17	1.74
Casey Lawrence	1	0	6.59	15	0	0	27.1	32	20	20	7	10	20	1.54
John King*	1	0	1.45	20	0	0	18.2	19	3	3	1	6	10	1.34
James Naile	0	0	8.80	10	0	0	15.1	27	19	15	1	9	7	2.35
Jacob Barnes	0	1	5.93	13	0	0	13.2	18	11	9	1	3	8	1.54
Packy Naughton*	0	0	0.00	4	0	0	5.0	2	0	0	0	1	5	0.60
Ryan Tepera	0	0	9.00	2	0	0	2.0	3	2	2	1	1	1	2.00
Guillermo Zuñiga	0	0	4.50	2	0	0	2.0	2	1	1	0	0	4	1.00
Alec Burleson*	0	0	21.60	2	0	0	1.2	8	4	4	1	0	1	4.80
Kyle Leahy	0	1	21.60	3	0	0	1.2	4	4	4	1	5	2	5.40
Player	W	L	ERA	G	GS	SV	IP	H	R	ER	HR	BB	SO	WHIP
Totals	71	91	4.79	162	162	36	1,428.1	1,549	829	760	179	530	1,215	1.456
Rank in NL	13	2	12	—	—	11	12	14	13	12	3	8	14	—

== Minor league system and first-year player draft ==
=== Teams ===
Level	Team	League	Division	Manager	W–L/Stats	Standing	Refs
Triple-A	Memphis Redbirds	International League	West	Ben Johnson	7–8		
Double-A	Springfield Cardinals	Texas League	North	José Leger	9–0		
High-A	Peoria Chiefs	Midwest League	West	Patrick Anderson	5–4		
Single-A	Palm Beach Cardinals	Florida State League	East	Gary Kendall	64–63		
Rookie	FCL Cardinals	Florida Complex League	East	Roberto Espinoza	17–33		
Foreign Rookie	DSL Cardinals	Dominican Summer League	South	Fray Peniche	17–36		

=== Major League Baseball draft ===
The 2023 Major League Baseball (MLB) First-Year Player Draft took place on July 9–11, 2023, in Seattle. The draft assigned amateur baseball players to MLB teams.

2023 St. Louis Cardinals complete draft list
Round	Pick	Name, Age	Pos / Bats (P throws)	School (State)	Signing bonus
1	21	Chase Davis, 21	OF / L	University of Arizona (AZ)	$6.3 million
2	No pick due to the signing of Willson Contreras				
3	90	Travis Honeyman, 21	OF / R	Boston College (MA)	$700,000
4	122	Quinn Mathews, 22	P / L	Stanford University (CA)	$600,000
5	158	Zach Levenson, 21	OF / R	University of Miami (FL)	$381,300
6	185	Jason Savacool, 21	P / R	University of Maryland (MD)	$302,300
7	215	Charles Harrison, 21	P / R	UCLA (CA)	$236,700
8	245	Ixan Henderson, 21	P / L	Fresno State University (CA)	$230,000
9	275	Christian Worley, 21	P / R	Virginia Tech (VA)	$200,000
10	305	Caden Kendle, 21	OF / R	University of California-Irvine (CA)	Did not sign
11	335	Dakota Harris, 21	SS / S	University of Oklahoma (OK)	$150,000
12	365	Brayden Jobert, 22	OF / L	LSU (LA)	$150,000
13	395	William Sullivan, 22	1B / L	Troy University (AL)	$150,000
14	425	Jacob Odle, 19	P / R	Orange Coast College (CA)	$150,000
15	455	Tre Richardson, 21	SS / R	Texas Christian University (TX)	$150,000
16	485	Tyler Bradt, 22	P / R	East Carolina University (NC)	$75,000
17	515	Trey Paige, 22	3B / L	Delaware State University (DE)	$150,000
18	545	Hunter Kublick, 20	P / R	Umpqua Community College (OR)	$150,000
19	575	Graysen Tarlow, 22	C / R	California State-Northridge (CA)	$125,000
20	605	Cameron Johnson, 18	P / L	IMG Academy HS (FL)	Did not sign
