= César Prieto =

Cuban baseball player (born 1999)

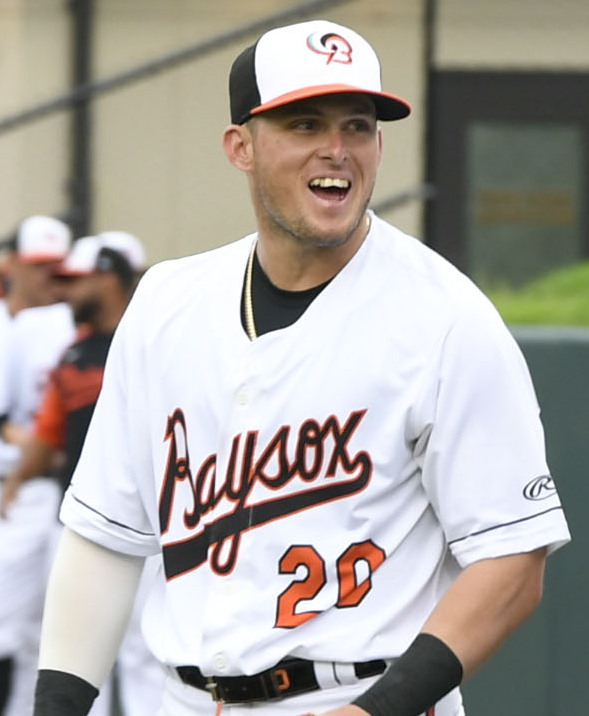
- Prieto with the Bowie Baysox in 2022

St. Louis Cardinals – No. 31
- Infielder
- Born: May 10, 1999 (age 27); Cienfuegos, Cuba
- Bats: Left Throws: Right

MLB debut
- August 29, 2025, for the St. Louis Cardinals

MLB statistics (through 2026 season)
- Batting average: .091
- Home runs: 0
- Runs batted in: 0
- Stats at Baseball Reference

Teams
- St. Louis Cardinals (2025–present)

César Prieto (born May 10, 1999) is a Cuban professional baseball infielder for the St. Louis Cardinals of Major League Baseball (MLB). He made his MLB debut in 2025.

== Career ==
Prieto was a member of the Cuba national baseball team. He also joined the Elefantes de Cienfuegos in 2017. His performance as an infielder and batter was considered one of the best in Cuba, and he won the Rookie of the Year Award in the 2018–19 season. Prieto defected to the United States in 2021 while in Florida for the qualifying tournament for the 2020 Summer Olympics.

=== Baltimore Orioles ===
On January 16, 2022, Prieto signed with the Baltimore Orioles as an international free agent for a bonus of $650,000. He split the season between the High–A Aberdeen IronBirds and Double–A Bowie Baysox. In 115 total contests, Prieto batted .273/.314/.404 with 11 home runs and 57 RBI.

In 2023, Prieto played in 58 games for Bowie, hitting .364 with 4 home runs and 29 RBI before he was promoted to the Triple–A Norfolk Tides. In 27 games for Norfolk, he slashed .317/.365/.471 with 2 home runs and 20 RBI.

=== St. Louis Cardinals ===
On August 1, 2023, Prieto, Drew Rom, and Zack Showalter were traded to the St. Louis Cardinals in exchange for pitcher Jack Flaherty. He made 38 appearances down the stretch for the Triple-A Memphis Redbirds, batting .270/.314/.387 with four home runs, 20 RBI, and two stolen bases. Prieto made 129 appearances for Memphis during the 2024 campaign, slashing .279/.318/.445 with 14 home runs and 56 RBI.

Prieto began the 2025 season back with Triple-A Memphis, batting .295/.359/.448 with nine home runs, 62 RBI, and 11 stolen bases across 107 appearances. On August 29, 2025, Prieto was selected to the 40-man roster and promoted to the major leagues for the first time. He made his major league debut that day the Cincinnati Reds, a game which the Cardinals won 7-5 in 10 innings. Prieto made three appearances for the Cardinals during his rookie campaign, going 1-for-6 (.167).

Prieto was optioned to Triple-A Memphis to begin the 2026 season.
