= Oliver Marmol =

American baseball manager (born 1986)

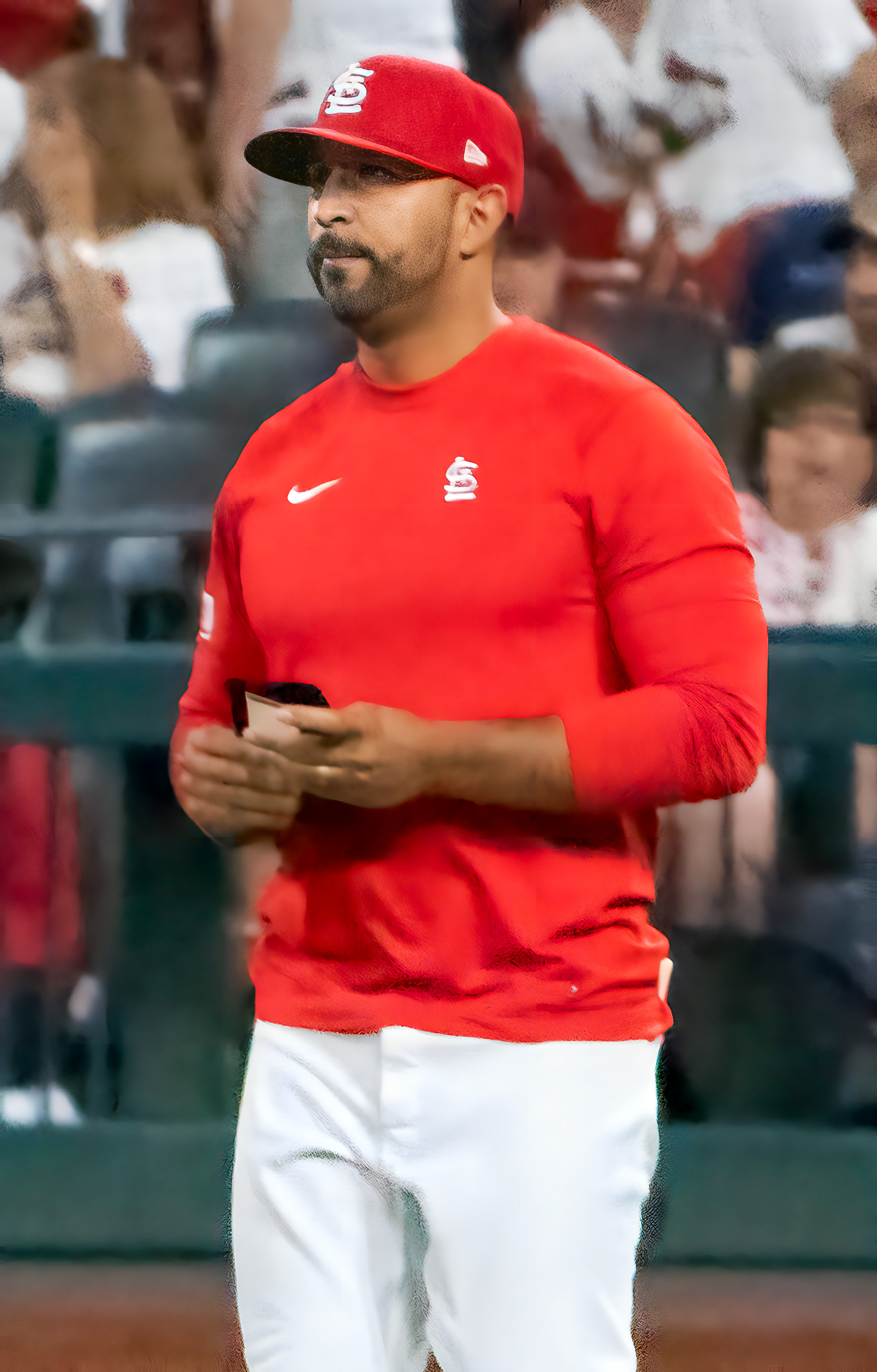
- Marmol with the St. Louis Cardinals in 2023.

St. Louis Cardinals – No. 37
- Manager
- Born: July 2, 1986 (age 40); Orlando, Florida, U.S.
- Bats: Right Throws: Right

MLB statistics (through September 4, 2026)
- Managerial record: 402-408
- Winning %: .496
- Stats at Baseball Reference
- Managerial record at Baseball Reference

Teams
- As manager: St. Louis Cardinals (2022–present); As coach: St. Louis Cardinals (2017–2021)

Oliver Jose "Oli" Marmol (born July 2, 1986) is an American professional baseball manager who is the manager of the St. Louis Cardinals of Major League Baseball (MLB).

== Early Life ==
Marmol was born to parents who both hailed from the Dominican Republic, and as the youngest of four sons in the family, ended up being the only son born in the United States. At the age of six, Marmol and his family, including his grandparents, endured the devastating impact of Hurricane Andrew, as it destroyed the family house in Miami, Florida, and subsequently as Marmol described, "...we lived in the front yard in a trailer for a little bit". Subsequently, Marmol & his family moved back to the Dominican Republic, where as Marmol describes, one of his brothers was then "being sought after for baseball", and his parents decided to give up a successful business in their home country after a time period to provide Marmol's brother the opportunity to play baseball and receive an education at the same time, while also providing the best for all members of the family. The nature of Marmol's chilhood led to him becoming bi-lingual in English and Spanish, which he later noted was a tremendous help in his future baseball career.

== Career ==
Marmol attended Dr. Phillips High School in Orlando, Florida, and was drafted by the Pittsburgh Pirates in the 31st round of the 2004 MLB draft. He did not sign with the Pirates and attended the College of Charleston, where he played college baseball for the College of Charleston Cougars. He batted .327 in three seasons with the Cougars, and was drafted by the St. Louis Cardinals in the sixth round of the 2007 MLB draft. He played in the Cardinals organization for four seasons, batting .203 as a utility player for the Batavia Muckdogs of the Low-A New York-Penn League, the Quad Cities River Bandits of the Single-A Midwest League, and the Palm Beach Cardinals of the High-A Florida State League.

In 2011, Marmol became the hitting coach of the Gulf Coast Cardinals of the Rookie-level Gulf Coast League. The next season, he became manager of the Johnson City Cardinals of the Rookie-level Appalachian League, and led the team to the postseason. In 2013, he managed the State College Spikes of the New York-Penn League. He returned to State College in 2014 and won the league's championship. In 2015, he was promoted to manage Palm Beach, and he managed Palm Beach for the 2016 season as well.

The Cardinals named Marmol their first base coach before the 2017 season. Before the 2019 season, the Cardinals shifted Marmol to bench coach. On October 25, 2021, he was promoted to manager of the Cardinals.

In 2022, at 35 years of age, he was the youngest manager in Major League Baseball, five years younger than the next youngest manager, Rocco Baldelli. He led the team to a 93–69 record which won the NL Central. The Cardinals lost to the Phillies 2–0 in the NL Wild Card Series. Before the 2024 regular season began, Marmol and the Cardinals agreed to a two-year contract extension through 2026.

=== 2026 Season & Tarps Off Encouragement ===
On March 1, 2026, Marmol and the Cardinals agreed to a two-year contract extension running through 2029. Shortly afterward in the March 26 to March 29 timeframe that encompassed the team's opening series of the 2026 season season at home at Busch Stadium, the Marmol-led Cardinals won the series two games to one against that season's eventual American League champion Tampa Bay Rays. Marmol then restarted a noteworthy direct fan interaction outlet on March 31 by beginning weekly in-season appearance on the Cardinals flagship radio station KMOX via appearing on "The Gashouse Gang" radio show, taking questions from fans & KMOX Sports Department staff members.

Later in the season, Marmol helped to encourage fan support at home Cardinals games when an unexpected event occurred on May 15. During that home game, the Stephen F. Austin State University club baseball team initiated a movement dubbed "Tarps Off", where by they took their t-shirts off during the game & waved them as a way to cheer the Cardinals on. The tactic worked, as the Cardinals rallied to an extra-inning win against the Kansas City Royals that night. At the post game press conference, before any reporter could ask a question of him, team manager Marmol said, "“Whoever started that in right field, I'll do whatever I need to do to make sure they come every game,” Marmol said Friday. “Because that was awesome. Not only them, but everybody that showed up today. That was a fun environment.”

"“Whoever started that in right field, I'll do whatever I need to do to make sure they come every game,...Because that was awesome. Not only them, but everybody that showed up today. That was a fun environment.”

— Oli Marmol prempts reporters' questions to comment on the "Tarps Off" fans at the May 15, 2026 Cardinals home game

Subsequently, the next day on social media, Marmol offered to buy tickets to any fans wanting to sit in right field Lodge area & who would "bring the energy." After the Cardinals were again victorious that evening, the club baseball team members were invited by manager Marmol into the team's clubhouse after the end of the game the next night as a gesture of appreciation of their enthusiasm & spirit. The team then declared a section of the right field stands the "Tarps Off" fan section for the remainder of the season, whereby anyone with a ticket to the game is welcome to stand in that fan supporter section.

After peaking multiple times at nine game above the .500 mark during the first half of the season, the team pulled back in winning percentage by the All-Star break. On September 4 during a road series against the Colorado Rockies, Marmol had to confront unusual circumstances in an incident that his team was dealt by umpire Doug Eddings, which made national sports headlines. Umpire Eddings emphatically announced the result of a failed challenge by the Cardinals on a play at third base, then a short time later proceeded to tell rookie pitcher Hancel Rincon during his Major League debut to adjust his hat, which Rincon was wearing titled to his left-hand side at the time. Marmol subsequently confronted Eddings in the bottom of the sixth inning once Justin Bruihl was warming up as the next pitcher for the Cardinals, to whom Eddings assessed a pitch clock violation, prompting an infuriated Marmol to get ejected from the game. Later in the game, with the Cardinals out of challenges, Eddings called a running safe during a play at the plate that he was both extremely close to and had a clear line of sight on where the batter was touched by the catcher's glove with the ball inside it before the batted touched the plate, prompting concerns of inappropriate behavior by Eddings. It took a three run home run by Ivan Herrera in the ninth inning for the Cardinals to win the game & avoid what could have been an even more extended timeframe on the controversy.

== Managerial record ==
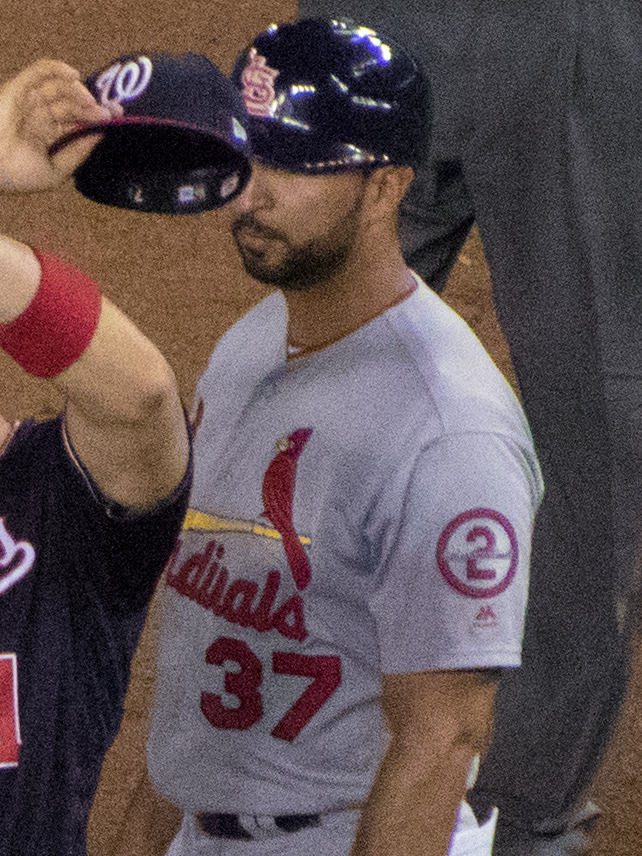
Marmol with the St. Louis Cardinals in 2018.

As of September 25, 2026

Team	Year	Regular season					Postseason			
Team	Year	Games	Won	Lost	Win %	Finish	Won	Lost	Win %	Result
STL	2022	162	93	69	.574	1st in NL Central	0	2	.000	Lost NLWCS (PHI)
STL	2023	162	71	91	.438	5th in NL Central	–	–	–	–
STL	2024	162	83	79	.512	2nd in NL Central	–	–	–	–
STL	2025	162	78	84	.481	4th in NL Central	–	–	–	–
STL	2026	162	77	85	.478	4th in NL Central	-	-	-	-
Total		810	402	408	.496		0	2	.000	

== Personal life ==
Marmol is a Christian. Marmol is married to Amber Marmol and they have one daughter together. Marmol has three brothers, 2 of them are pastors and one is a police officer. He and his wife have taken short-term missions to orphanages in Guatemala and Nicaragua.
