= Drew Rom =

American baseball player (born 1999)

Athletics – No. 39
- Pitcher
- Born: December 15, 1999 (age 26); Cincinnati, Ohio, U.S.
- Bats: Left Throws: Left

MLB debut
- August 21, 2023, for the St. Louis Cardinals

MLB statistics (through 2026 season)
- Win–loss record: 2–5
- Earned run average: 7.19
- Strikeouts: 49
- Stats at Baseball Reference

Teams
- St. Louis Cardinals (2023); Milwaukee Brewers (2026); Athletics (2026–present)

Drew Michael Rom (born December 15, 1999) is an American professional baseball pitcher for the Athletics of Major League Baseball (MLB). He has previously played in MLB for the St. Louis Cardinals and Milwaukee Brewers. The Baltimore Orioles selected him in the fourth round of the 2018 MLB draft.

== Amateur career ==
Rom attended Highlands High School in Fort Thomas, Kentucky. In 2018, as a senior, he had a 9–6 win–loss record, a 2.27 earned run average (ERA), and 129 strikeouts for the baseball team and was named Kentucky's Mr. Baseball. The Baltimore Orioles selected Rom in the fourth round, with the 115th overall pick, of the 2018 Major League Baseball draft. He signed for $650,000, forgoing his commitment to play college baseball at the University of Michigan.

== Professional career ==
=== Baltimore Orioles ===
After signing, Rom made his professional debut with the Rookie-level Gulf Coast League Orioles, posting a 1.76 ERA over 30 2/3 innings. In 2019, he played with the Delmarva Shorebirds of the Single-A South Atlantic League, earning All-Star honors while appearing in 21 games (making 15 starts) and pitching to a 6–3 record, a 2.93 ERA and 122 strikeouts over 95 1/3 innings. He did not play a game in 2020 due to the cancellation of the minor league season because of the COVID-19 pandemic.

Rom began the 2021 season with the Aberdeen IronBirds of the High-A East and was promoted to the Bowie Baysox of the Double-A Northeast in late July. Over 23 games (twenty starts) between the two clubs, Rom went 11–1 with a 3.18 ERA and 120 strikeouts over 107 2/3 innings. He returned to Bowie to begin the 2022 season. After five starts, he was placed on the injured list, and was activated less than a month later. In mid-August, he was promoted to the Norfolk Tides of the Triple-A International League. Over 26 games (25 starts) between the two teams, he posted an 8–3 record with a 4.43 ERA and 144 strikeouts over 120 innings.

On November 15, 2022, the Orioles selected Rom's contract and added him to the 40-man roster to protect him from the Rule 5 draft. Rom was optioned to Triple-A Norfolk to begin the 2023 season. In six starts for the Tides, Rom registered a 4–1 record and 2.87 ERA with 32 strikeouts in 31 1/3 innings pitched.

On May 9, 2023, Rom was promoted to the major leagues for the first time. Rom did not appear in a game for the Orioles during their series against the Tampa Bay Rays, and was optioned down to Triple-A Norfolk on May 11, becoming a phantom ballplayer.

=== St. Louis Cardinals ===
On August 1, 2023, the Orioles traded Rom, César Prieto, and Zack Showalter to the St. Louis Cardinals in exchange for pitcher Jack Flaherty. They assigned him to the Triple–A Memphis Redbirds. The Cardinals promoted him to the major leagues on August 21 and he made his MLB debut that night at PNC Park against the Pittsburgh Pirates. Rom was the Cardinals' starting pitcher and gave up eight runs across 3 2/3 innings in an 11–1 loss. In eight starts for the Cardinals, he pitched to a 1–4 record and 8.02 ERA with 32 strikeouts across 33 2/3 innings.

Rom began the 2024 season on the injured list due to a biceps injury. He was transferred to the 60–day injured list on April 30, 2024. On May 9, it was announced that Rom had undergone arthroscopic surgery on his left shoulder. On November 19, Rom was removed from the 40–man roster and sent outright to the Memphis.

In 2025, Rom made seven starts split between Memphis and the Single-A Palm Beach Cardinals, accumulating an 0–1 record and 3.86 ERA with 24 strikeouts across 23 1/3 innings pitched. He elected free agency following the season on November 6, 2025.

=== Milwaukee Brewers ===
On December 17, 2025, Rom signed a minor league contract with the Milwaukee Brewers. He made 22 appearances for the Triple-A Nashville Sounds, registering a 2–1 record and 3.04 ERA with 39 strikeouts and one save across 26 2/3 innings pitched. On June 6, 2026, the Brewers selected Rom's contract, adding him to their active roster. He made five appearances for Milwaukee, recording a 1–0 record and 3.18 ERA with 11 strikeouts across 5 2/3 innings pitched. Rom was designated for assignment by the Brewers on August 9.

=== Athletics ===
On August 11, 2026, Rom was claimed off of waivers by the Athletics. He made 13 relief appearances for the Athletics and had a 0–1 record with a 6.75 ERA with six strikeouts across 12 innings.
