= Jack Flaherty =

American baseball player (born 1995)

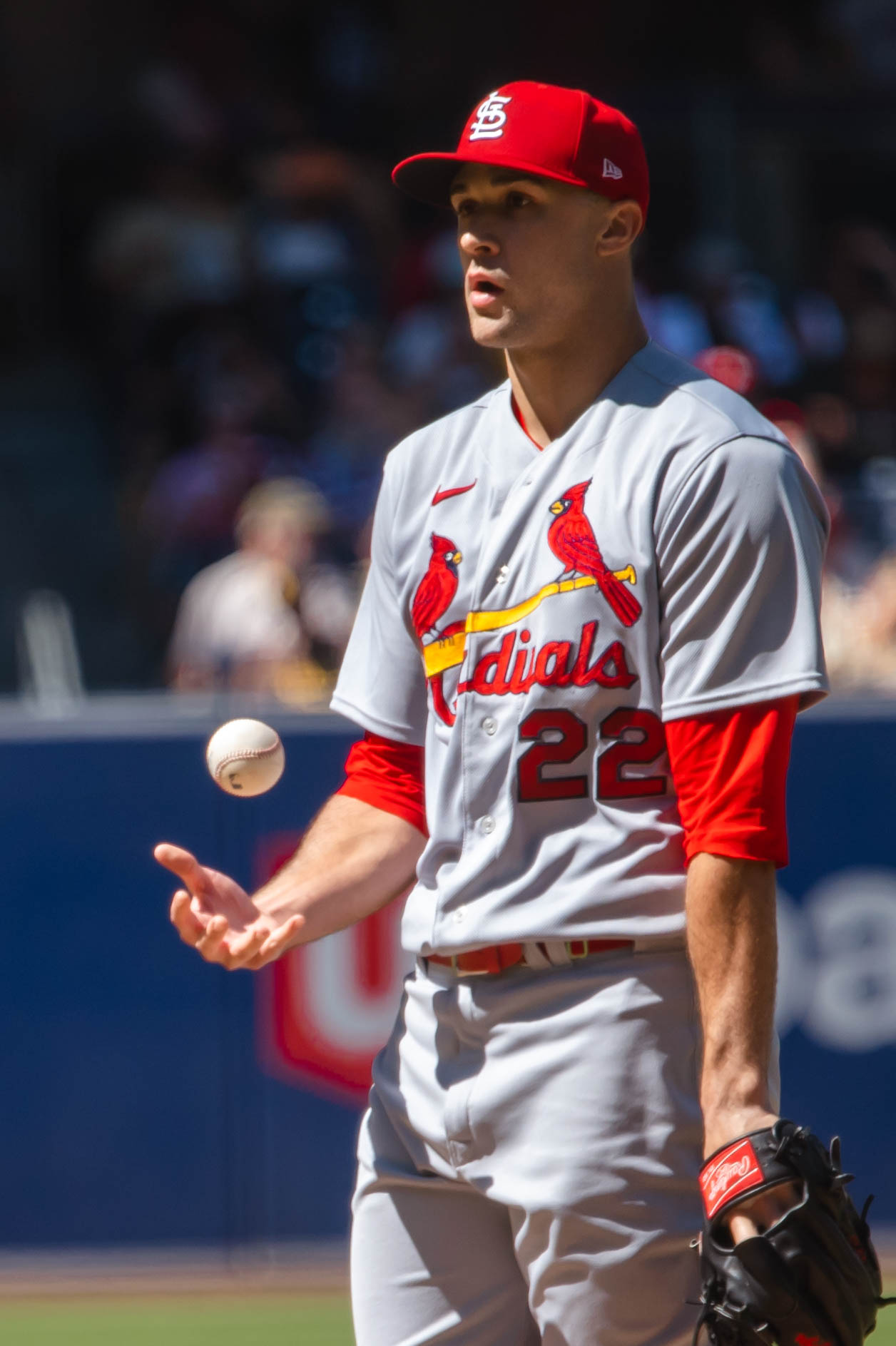
- Flaherty with the St. Louis Cardinals in 2022

Free agent
- Pitcher
- Born: October 15, 1995 (age 31); Burbank, California, U.S.
- Bats: Right Throws: Right

MLB debut
- September 1, 2017, for the St. Louis Cardinals

MLB statistics (through 2026 season)
- Win–loss record: 66–64
- Earned run average: 3.85
- Strikeouts: 1,233
- Stats at Baseball Reference

Teams
- St. Louis Cardinals (2017–2023); Baltimore Orioles (2023); Detroit Tigers (2024); Los Angeles Dodgers (2024); Detroit Tigers (2025–2026)

Career highlights and awards
- World Series champion (2024)
Medals
Men's baseball
Representing United States
18U Baseball World Cup
Gold medal – first place	2013 Taichung	Team

Jack Rafe Flaherty (/flɛər.ti/, born October 15, 1995) is an American professional baseball pitcher who is a free agent. He has played in Major League Baseball (MLB) for the St. Louis Cardinals, Baltimore Orioles, Detroit Tigers, and Los Angeles Dodgers. Flaherty was selected by the Cardinals in the first round of the 2014 MLB draft and made his MLB debut with them in 2017.

== Amateur career ==
Flaherty attended Harvard-Westlake School in Los Angeles, California, where his pitching coach was future MLB pitching coach Ethan Katz. He pitched and played shortstop and third base as a member of the varsity baseball team for all four of his years at Harvard-Westlake. He was a sophomore when two of his high school teammates and fellow pitchers, Max Fried and Lucas Giolito, were both drafted in the first round of the 2012 MLB draft. In 2013, as a junior, Flaherty pitched a 13–0 record with a 0.63 ERA, striking out 112 batters in 89 innings while only walking 10. During his senior season, Harvard-Westlake was the consensus #1 team in the nation in the MaxPreps "XCellent 50" for much of the beginning of the season, before dropping out of the rankings altogether.

Flaherty played for the United States national team at the 2013 18U Baseball World Cup, pitching 10 1/3 innings to help win the Gold Medal in the tournament.

On April 29, 2014, Flaherty pitched a complete game, a 2–1 victory over Bishop Alemany High School, to bring a two-year win–loss record to 20–0. In his last two seasons, his record was 23–0 overall. He finished the 2014 regular season with an 0.63 ERA and a 10–0 record on his way to being named Southern Section Division I Player of the Year along with the Los Angeles Times Player of the Year. He pitched 78 innings (IP), struck out 125 (K) batters while giving up just 32 hits and 12 bases on balls (BB). In the first game of the playoffs – which was also the last game of his high school career – he threw a no-hitter against Riverside North. He was subsequently named the 2014 Gatorade Player of the Year in baseball for the state of California. The Los Angeles Times selected him as their baseball player of the year. In his four years on the mound, his record was 35–3.

== Professional career ==
=== St. Louis Cardinals (2014–2023) ===
==== Minor leagues ====
Although Flaherty signed a letter of intent to attend the University of North Carolina, he began his professional career after the St. Louis Cardinals drafted him in the first round with the 34th overall selection of the 2014 MLB draft. It was a compensatory pick that the Cardinals gained when Carlos Beltrán signed with the New York Yankees as a free agent. Flaherty signed with the Cardinals on June 17 for a $2 million bonus and began his minor league career with the Cardinals of the Gulf Coast League, where he posted a 1.59 ERA in 22 2/3 innings pitched. In 2015 he played for the Peoria Chiefs where he was 9–3 with a 2.84 ERA in 18 starts. Prior to the 2016 season, Baseball America ranked him as the third-best prospect in the Cardinals' system. He spent the season with the Palm Beach Cardinals. In their updated 2016 mid-season ranking, Baseball America rated Flaherty in the top-100 for the first time, at 88th. In 24 games (23 starts) at Palm Beach, Flaherty was 5–9 with a 3.56 ERA.

Flaherty began the 2017 season with the Springfield Cardinals, and after posting a 7–2 record with a 1.42 ERA in ten starts, he was promoted to the Memphis Redbirds, where he was 7–2 with a 2.74 ERA in 15 starts. Combined, Flaherty struck out 147 and walked 35 in 148 2/3 innings.

==== 2017 ====
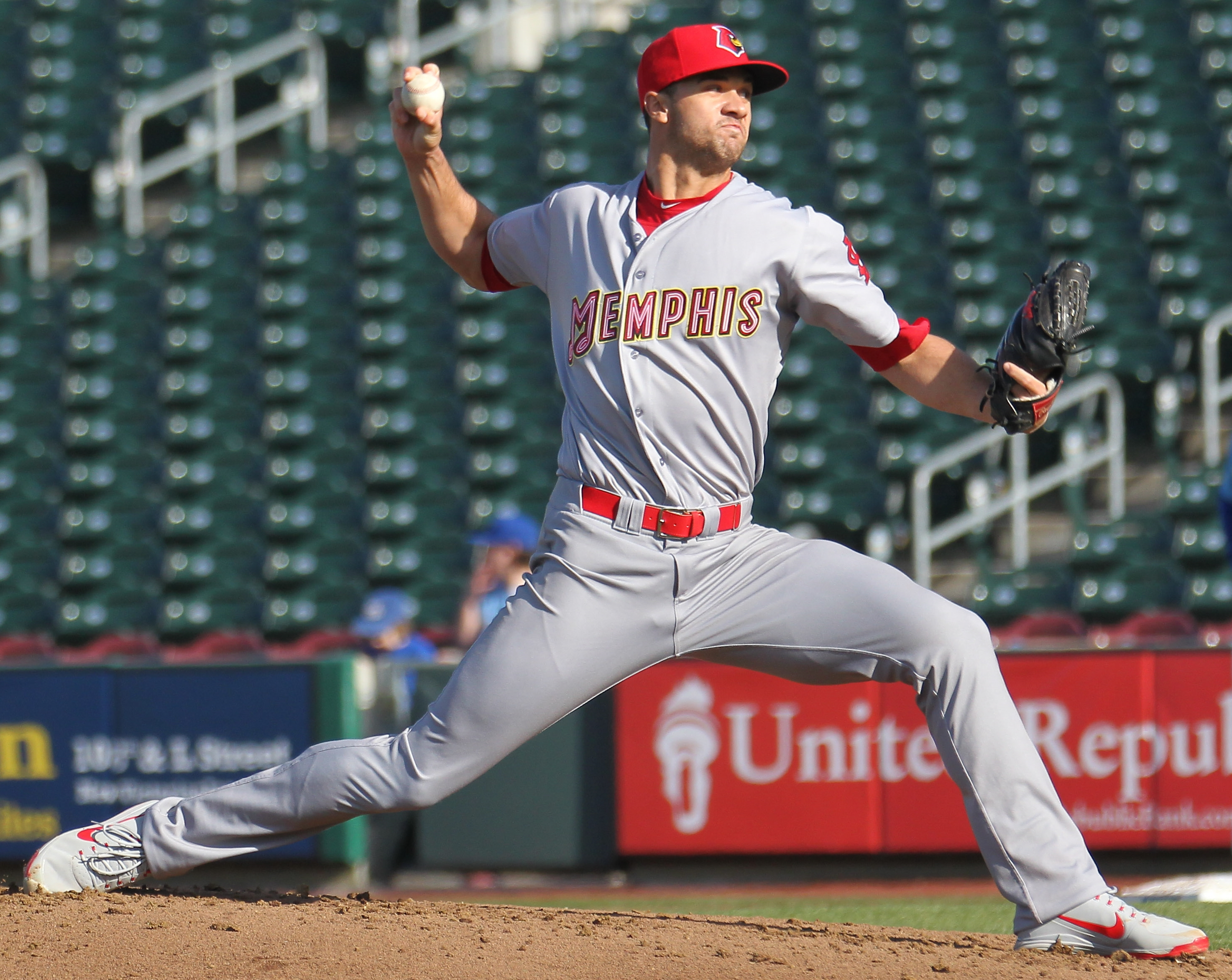
Flaherty with the Memphis Redbirds in 2018

On September 1, 2017, Flaherty was promoted to MLB to make his MLB debut against the San Francisco Giants. He pitched four innings, gave up five runs, and struck out six while not receiving a decision in an eventual 11–6 win. He struck out the first batter he faced, Denard Span. Flaherty finished the season 0–2 with a 6.33 ERA in 21 1/3 innings pitched. After the season, the Cardinals named Flaherty their 2017 Minor League Pitcher of the Year.

==== 2018 ====
On March 25, 2018, the Cardinals announced that Flaherty had made the Opening Day roster in place of the injured Adam Wainwright. He was optioned back to Memphis on April 4 once Wainwright was activated. He was recalled and optioned back once more before taking the injured Wainwright's spot in the rotation in May.

Flaherty earned his first MLB win on May 20, 2018. Throwing 120 pitches, he gave up one earned run, struck out 13, walked one, and gave up only two hits in a 5–1 win over the Philadelphia Phillies at Busch Stadium. He finished his 2018 rookie year with an 8–9 record and a 3.34 ERA in 28 starts, striking out 182 batters in 151 innings pitched.

==== 2019 ====
Flaherty entered the second half of the season with an ERA of 4.64 but following the All-Star break, he yielded a 0.91 ERA, the third-lowest in major league history, behind only Bob Gibson and Jake Arrieta. Flaherty was named the National League Pitcher of the Month for August after going 5–1 with a 0.71 ERA, and he again won the award in September with a 0.82 ERA over 44 innings. He ended the 2019 regular season with an 11–8 record and a 2.75 ERA over 33 starts, striking out 231 over 196 1/3 innings, becoming the third-youngest pitcher in baseball history to strike out at least 230 and walk 55 or fewer with a 2.75 ERA or lower. Following the season, he was nominated for his first ever Gold Glove and finished fourth in National League Cy Young Award voting. He was also named All-MLB second team that year. He made his post-season debut this season, making two starts in the Division Series against the Atlanta Braves and allowing four runs in 13 innings while striking out 16. He also made one start in the Championship Series against the Washington Nationals, giving up four runs in four innings.

==== 2020 ====
Flaherty made his first Opening Day start to open the pandemic shortened 2020 season. He started nine games in which he went 4–3 with a 4.91 ERA and 49 strikeouts over 40 1/3 innings. He also made one start in the Wild Card Series, allowing only one run in six innings but taking the loss when the Cardinals were shut out by the San Diego Padres.

==== 2021 ====
Prior to the 2021 season, Flaherty won his salary arbitration case against the Cardinals, and he made $3.9 million as opposed to the Cardinals submitted salary of $3 million. He made his second consecutive Opening Day start and on May 8, hit his first career home run off of Colorado Rockies starter Austin Gomber. On May 31, he was placed on the injured list for the first time in his career after suffering an oblique strain while batting. He returned to the club on August 13, but was placed on the injured list once again on August 25 with a right shoulder strain. He was activated September 24.

For the 2021 season, Flaherty appeared in 17 games (making 15 starts), going 9–2 with a 3.22 ERA, 85 strikeouts, and 26 walks over 78 1/3 innings.

==== 2022 ====
On March 22, Flaherty signed a one-year, $5 million, contract with the Cardinals to avoid salary arbitration. He entered the season dealing with a right shoulder injury that sidelined him during spring training and the beginning of the season. After making three starts in June and struggling to a 5.63 ERA, he departed his third start with shoulder tightness and was later placed on the 60-day injured list on July 11. He was activated again on September 5 and finished the season with a 4.25 ERA in nine appearances.

==== 2023 ====
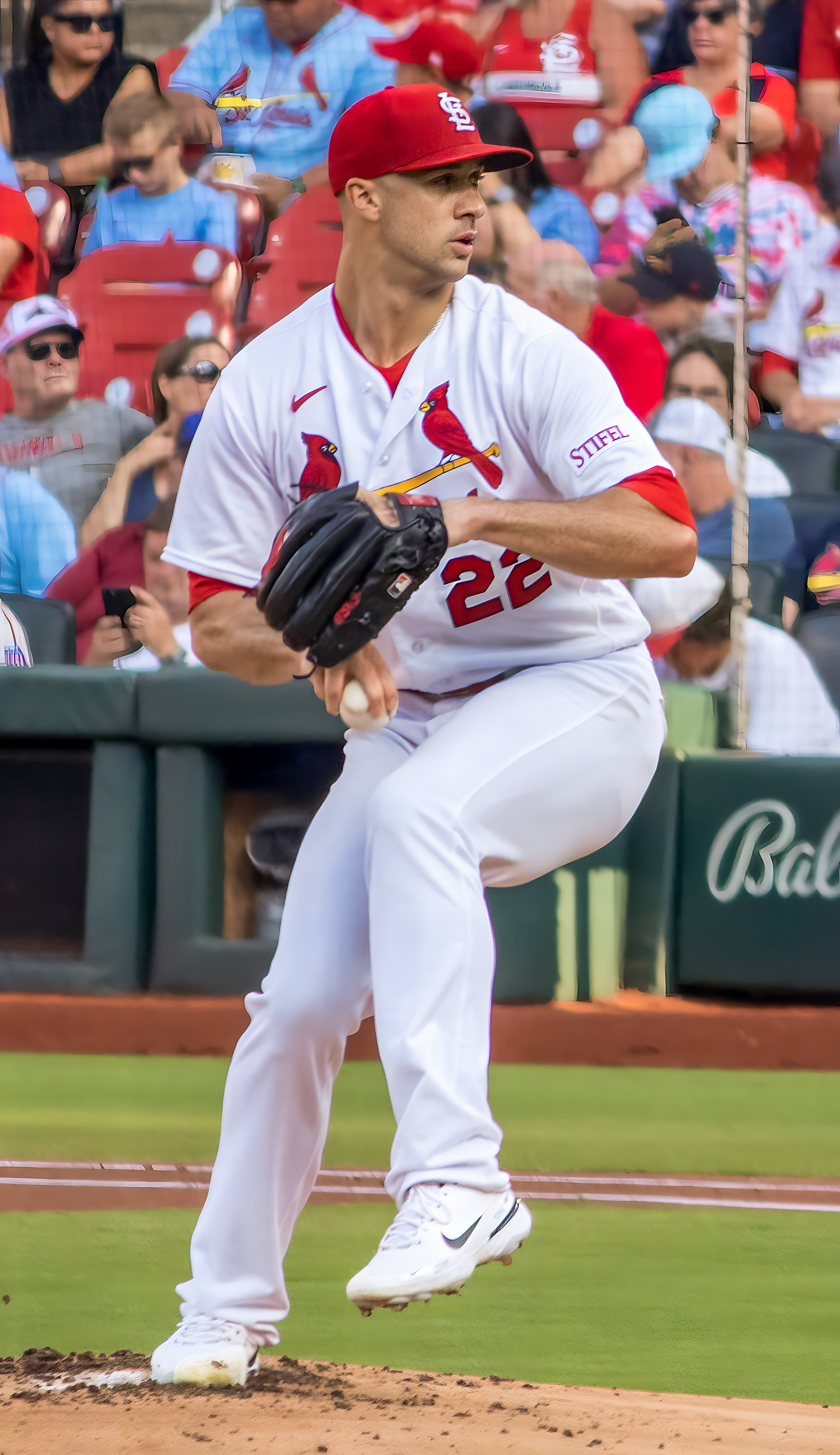
Flaherty pitching in 2023

On January 13, 2023, Flaherty agreed to a one-year, $5.4 million contract, again avoiding salary arbitration. He made 20 starts for the Cardinals, with a 4.43 ERA and 106 strikeouts.

=== Baltimore Orioles (2023) ===
On August 1, 2023, Flaherty was traded to the Baltimore Orioles in exchange for prospects César Prieto, Drew Rom, and Zack Showalter. Two days later, he allowed a run in six innings to earn the win in his Orioles debut against the Toronto Blue Jays. He was 1–3 with a 6.75 ERA in nine appearances (seven starts) for the Orioles in the regular season and allowed one run on two hits in two innings of relief in the Division Series against the Texas Rangers.

=== Detroit Tigers (2024) ===
On December 20, 2023, Flaherty signed a one-year, $14 million contract with the Detroit Tigers. In 18 starts for Detroit in 2024, he went 7–5 with a 2.95 ERA and 133 strikeouts.

=== Los Angeles Dodgers (2024) ===
On July 30, 2024, the Tigers traded Flaherty to the Los Angeles Dodgers in exchange for minor league prospects Thayron Liranzo and Trey Sweeney. He made 10 starts for the Dodgers, with a 6–2 record, 3.58 ERA and 61 strikeouts.

Flaherty pitched Game 2 of the 2024 NLDS against the San Diego Padres and took the loss, while allowing four runs in 5 1/3 innings. He allowed a solo homer to Fernando Tatís Jr. in the first and a two-run homer to David Peralta in the fourth inning. In his second postseason start, in the opening game of the 2024 NLCS against the New York Mets, he pitched seven scoreless innings in the Dodgers shutout win. However, in his Game 5 start, Flaherty had one of the worst starts of his career, allowing a leadoff single and a walk to open the game which led to a three-run home run by Pete Alonso. In three innings, he allowed eight runs on eight hits and four walks. Despite the poor start, he was chosen to start the opening game of the 2024 World Series against the New York Yankees. He shut out the Yankees for five innings, before allowing a two-run home run to Giancarlo Stanton in the sixth inning. Overall, he allowed just the two runs on five hits with six strikeouts in 5 1/3 innings. He performed poorly in his second start of the World Series, in Game 5, allowing four runs on two home runs in only 1 1/3 innings pitched. Despite his performance, the Dodgers came back to win the game and the series.

=== Detroit Tigers (2025–2026) ===
On February 7, 2025, Flaherty signed a two-year, $35 million contract to return to the Tigers. On May 22, Flaherty recorded his 1,000th career strikeout when he struck out José Ramírez in the top of the first inning against the Cleveland Guardians.

== Personal life ==
Flaherty was adopted by Eileen Flaherty when he was three weeks old. Flaherty is Catholic. He is biracial and identifies as Black and has been actively involved in supporting the Black Lives Matter movement and other social justice movements.

On April 2, 2026, Flaherty announced his engagement to former professional soccer player and Mexico women's national team member Katie Johnson. The two made their relationship public in July of 2025.

== See also ==
- List of World Series starting pitchers
