= 2025 Los Angeles Dodgers season =

Season for the Major League Baseball team the Los Angeles Dodgers

2025 Los Angeles Dodgers
- World Series champions National League champions National League West champions
- League: National League
- Division: West
- Ballpark: Dodger Stadium
- City: Los Angeles, California
- Record: 93–69 (.574)
- Divisional place: 1st
- Owners: Guggenheim Baseball Management
- President: Stan Kasten
- President of baseball operations: Andrew Friedman
- General managers: Brandon Gomes
- Managers: Dave Roberts
- Television: Spectrum SportsNet LA (Joe Davis, Stephen Nelson, Orel Hershiser, Eric Karros, Jessica Mendoza, Nomar Garciaparra, Kirsten Watson, David Vassegh)
- Radio: KLAC-AM; Los Angeles Dodgers Radio Network (Charley Steiner, Tim Neverett, Stephen Nelson, Rick Monday, José Mota, James Loney, David Vassegh); KTNQ (Pepe Yñiguez, José Mota, Luis Cruz)
- Stats: ESPN.com; Baseball Reference

The 2025 Los Angeles Dodgers season was the 136th season for the Los Angeles Dodgers franchise in Major League Baseball (MLB), their 68th season in Los Angeles, California, and their 64th season playing their home games at Dodger Stadium. They entered the season as the defending World Series champions after winning their eighth World Series title in franchise history, and finished the season by successfully defending their title for the first time in franchise history, winning their ninth title in the 2025 World Series over the Toronto Blue Jays, 4–3.

For the second year in a row, the Dodgers began the season outside of America, this time in Tokyo, Japan for the Tokyo Series. They became the first defending World Series champion to begin their season 8–0, besting the previous record held by the 1933 Yankees, who started their season 7–0. The Dodgers clinched their 13th straight post-season appearance on September 19, extending the longest streak in franchise history. On September 25, they clinched the National League West title for the fourth straight season and 12th time the last 13 years.

On September 18, three-time Cy Young winner and former MVP Clayton Kershaw announced his retirement at the conclusion of the season.

As the third seed, the Dodgers opened the playoffs in the Wild Card Series against the sixth seed, Cincinnati Reds. They swept the Reds in two games to advance to the NLDS. They then defeated the Philadelphia Phillies in four games and advanced to the National League Championship Series for the second year in a row. They swept the Milwaukee Brewers in four games to win their second straight NLCS and the fifth in nine years (2017–2018, 2020, 2024–2025), in a series defined by their starting pitching dominance. They defeated the Blue Jays in the World Series in seven games to become the first franchise to repeat as World Series champions since the 1998–2000 New York Yankees. The Dodgers were just the ninth team to win Games 6 and 7 on the road in a World Series. In Game 7, they were the first team in MLB history to stage a comeback on the road in the ninth inning of a winner-take-all World Series game, ultimately winning in 11 innings by a score of 5–4. Unlike the previous season, the Dodgers did not hold home-advantage for any of the last three rounds.

in terms of awards won, Shohei Ohtani won his second consecutive Most Valuable Player (MVP) award (his fourth overall), while winning the NLCS MVP, the first postseason award of his career. His three home run, 10 strikeouts over 6 innings (zero earned runs) performance in Game 4 has been cited as one of the best individual games in MLB history. Yoshinobu Yamamoto starred in the World Series, posting a 1.04 ERA and three wins across three games pitched, which won him the World Series MVP.

The Los Angeles Dodgers drew an average home attendance of 49,536, the highest of all MLB teams. The team also passed 4 million in home attendance for the first time in franchise history.

== Offseason ==
=== Roster departures ===
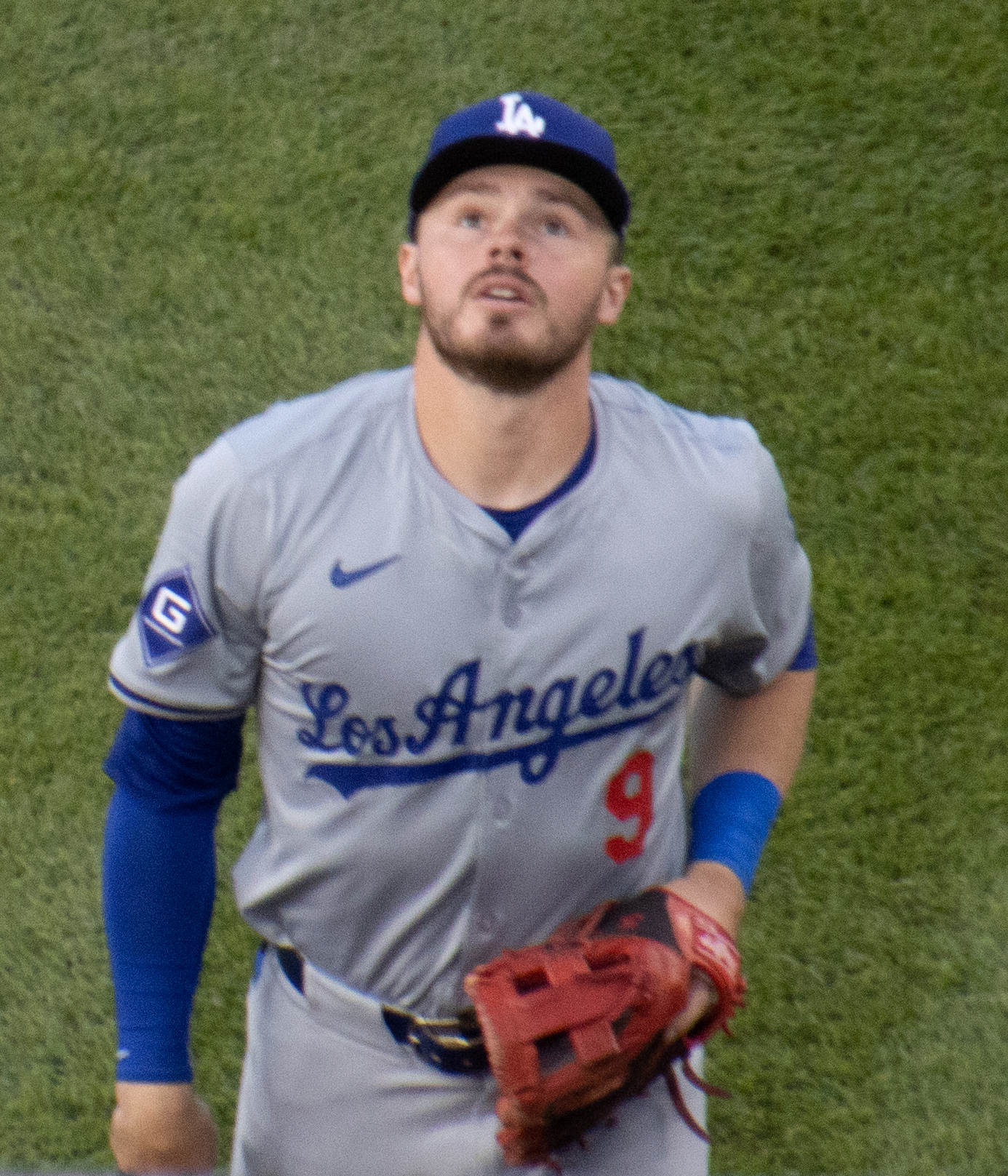
Second baseman Gavin Lux was traded to the Reds on January 6.

On October 31, 2024, the day after the 2024 World Series ended, six Dodgers players became free agents. They included pitchers Walker Buehler, Jack Flaherty, Joe Kelly and Blake Treinen, outfielder Teoscar Hernández and utility player Kiké Hernández. Pitcher Daniel Hudson and outfielder Kevin Kiermaier also announced their retirements after the World Series. On November 4, pitcher Clayton Kershaw declined the player option on his contract, making him a free agent. On November 14, the Dodgers outrighted pitcher Connor Brogdon to the minors and removed him from the 40-man roster. On November 22, the Dodgers non-tendered pitchers Brent Honeywell Jr. and Zach Logue, making them free agents. On January 3, they designated catcher Diego Cartaya for assignment, removing him from the roster. On January 6, the Dodgers traded second baseman Gavin Lux to the Cincinnati Reds in exchange for minor league outfielder Mike Sirota and a competitive balance pick in the 2025 MLB draft. On January 30, pitcher Ryan Brasier was designated for assignment in order to clear a spot on the 40-man roster.

=== Coaching staff ===
On November 10, it was announced that first base coach Clayton McCullough would leave the team to become the Manager of the Miami Marlins. On November 22, they hired Chris Woodward, who had been the third base coach for the Dodgers from 2016 to 2018 before leaving to manage the Texas Rangers, to replace McCullough as the first base coach. The Dodgers also announced that Vice President of Player Performance Brandon McDaniel would be joining the major league coaching staff in a new role as Major League Development Integration Coach.

=== Broadcast team ===
After the death of Dodger legend and longtime Spanish language broadcaster Fernando Valenzuela at the end of the 2024 season, the Dodgers hired former player Luis Cruz to join the Spanish language broadcast team for 2025 as an analyst.

=== Roster additions ===
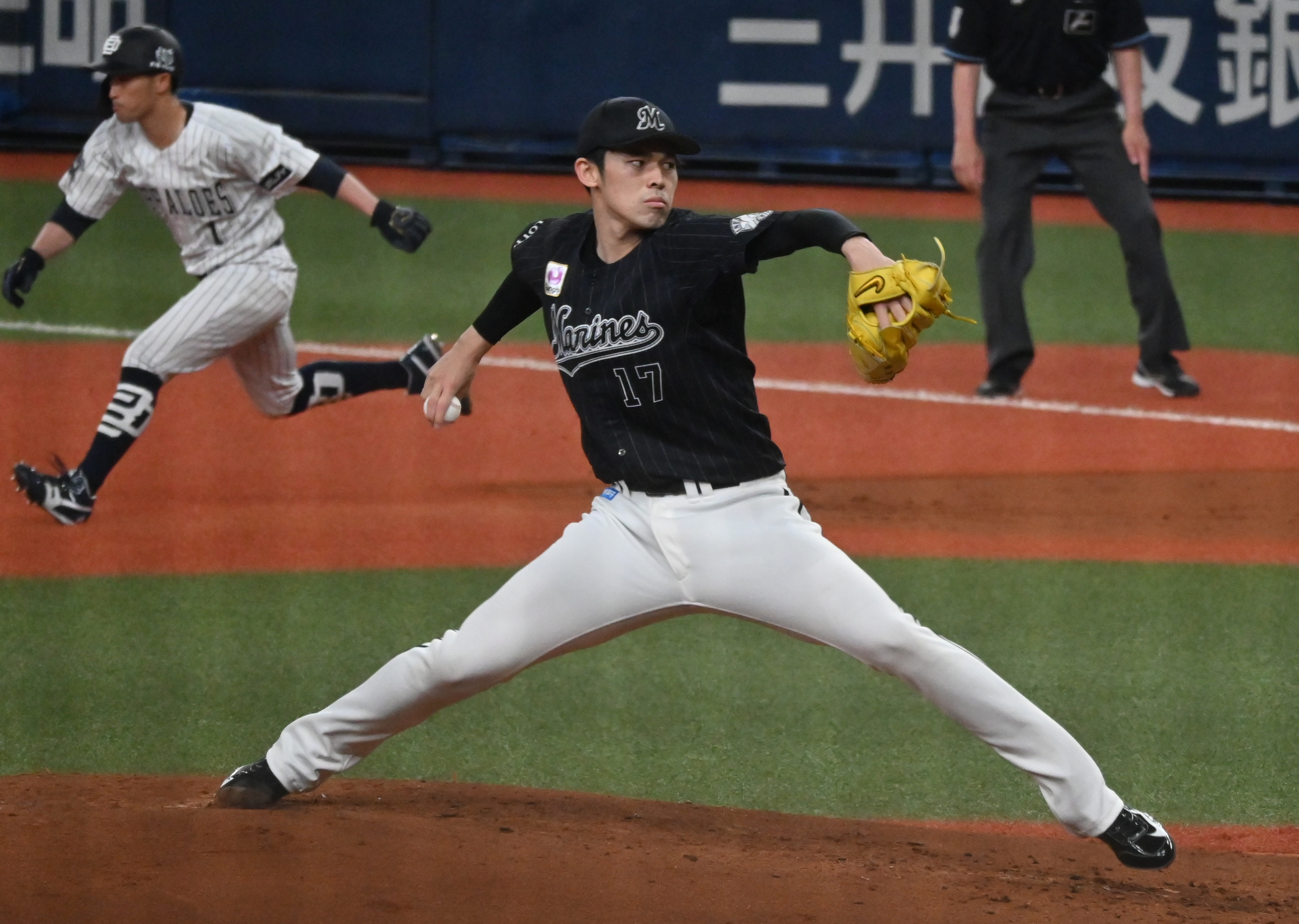
The Dodgers signed Japanese pitcher Roki Sasaki as an international free agent.

On November 19, the Dodgers purchased the contract of left handed pitcher Jack Dreyer from the Triple–A Oklahoma City Comets and added him to the 40-man roster. On November 30, they signed left-handed pitcher Blake Snell to a five-year, $182 million contract. On December 10, they signed outfielder Michael Conforto to a one-year, $17 million contract and re-signed reliever Blake Treinen on a two-year, $22 million contract. On January 3, they re-signed Teoscar Hernández to a three-year, $66 million contract and signed South Korean shortstop Hyeseong Kim to a three-year, $12.5 million contract. On January 22, the Dodgers signed Japanese pitcher Roki Sasaki of the Chiba Lotte Marines to a $6.5 million signing bonus as an international free agent. The following day, they signed pitcher Tanner Scott to a four-year, $72 million, contract. On January 30, they signed relief pitcher Kirby Yates to a one-year, $13 million, contract. On February 11, utility player Kiké Hernández re-signed with the Dodgers on a one-year contract. Two days later, the Dodgers also re-signed Clayton Kershaw, on a one-year deal, returning him to the roster for an 18th season.

Off-season 40-man roster moves

Departing player	Date	Transaction	New team	Arriving player	Old team	Date	Transaction
Walker Buehler	October 31	Free agent	Boston Red Sox	Jack Dreyer	Oklahoma City Comets	November 19	Added to 40-man roster
Jack Flaherty	October 31	Free agent	Detroit Tigers	Blake Snell	San Francisco Giants	November 30	Free agent signing
Kiké Hernández	October 31	Free agent	Los Angeles Dodgers	Michael Conforto	San Francisco Giants	December 10	Free agent signing
Teoscar Hernández	October 31	Free agent	Los Angeles Dodgers	Blake Treinen	Los Angeles Dodgers	December 10	Free agent signing
Joe Kelly	October 31	Free agent	N/A	Teoscar Hernández	Los Angeles Dodgers	January 3	Free agent signing
Blake Treinen	October 31	Free agent	Los Angeles Dodgers	Hyeseong Kim	Kiwoom Heroes	January 3	Free agent signing
Daniel Hudson	October 31	Retired	N/A	Tanner Scott	San Diego Padres	January 23	Free agent signing
Kevin Kiermaier	October 31	Retired	N/A	Kirby Yates	Texas Rangers	January 30	Free agent signing
Clayton Kershaw	November 4	Option declined	Los Angeles Dodgers	Kiké Hernández	Los Angeles Dodgers	February 11	Free agent signing
Connor Brogdon	November 14	Outrighted	Los Angeles Angels	Clayton Kershaw	Los Angeles Dodgers	February 13	Free agent signing
Brent Honeywell Jr.	November 22	Non-tendered	N/A				
Zach Logue	November 22	Non-tendered	Doosan Bears				
Diego Cartaya	January 3	Designated for assignment	Minnesota Twins				
Gavin Lux	January 6	Trade	Cincinnati Reds				
Ryan Brasier	January 30	Designated for assignment	Chicago Cubs				

== Spring training ==
Spring Training non-roster invitees

Player	Position	2024 team(s)
Sam Carlson	Pitcher	Biloxi Shuckers (AA)
Carlos Duran	Pitcher	Rancho Cucamonga Quakes (A) / Tulsa Drillers (AA) / Oklahoma City Baseball Club (AAA)
Julián Fernández	Pitcher	El Águila de Veracruz
Jackson Ferris	Pitcher	Great Lakes Loons (High-A) / Tulsa Drillers (AA)
Giovanny Gallegos	Pitcher	St. Louis Cardinals
Luis García	Pitcher	Los Angeles Angels / Boston Red Sox
José E. Hernández	Pitcher	Pittsburgh Pirates
Joe Jacques	Pitcher	Arizona Diamondbacks / Boston Red Sox
Justin Jarvis	Pitcher	Binghamton Rumble Ponies (AA) / Syracuse Mets (AAA)
Jared Karros	Pitcher	Great Lakes Loons (High A) / Tulsa Drillers (AA)
Jack Little	Pitcher	Tulsa Drillers (AA) / Oklahoma City Baseball Club (AAA)
Jose Rodriguez	Pitcher	Rancho Cucamonga Quakes (A) / Great Lakes Loons (High A)
Roki Sasaki	Pitcher	Chiba Lotte Marines
Matt Sauer	Pitcher	Kansas City Royals
Griffin Lockwood-Powell	Catcher	Tulsa Drillers (AA)
Chris Okey	Catcher	Oklahoma City Baseball Club (AAA)
Dalton Rushing	Catcher	Tulsa Drillers (AA) / Oklahoma City Baseball Club (AAA)
David Bote	Infielder	Chicago Cubs
Michael Chavis	Infielder	Tacoma Rainiers (AAA) / Charlotte Knights (AAA)
Alex Freeland	Infielder	Great Lakes Loons (High A) / Tulsa Drillers (AA) / Oklahoma City Baseball Club (AAA)
Austin Gauthier	Infielder	Tulsa Drillers (AA) / Oklahoma City Baseball Club (AAA)
Kody Hoese	Infielder	Oklahoma City Baseball Club (AAA)
Josue De Paula	Outfielder	Rancho Cucamonga Quakes (A) / Great Lakes Loons (High A)
Justin Dean	Outfielder	Mississippi Braves (AA) / Gwinnett Stripers (AAA)
Zyhir Hope	Outfielder	Arizona Complex League Dodgers (Rookie) / Rancho Cucamonga Quakes (A)
Eddie Rosario	Outfielder	Washington Nationals / Atlanta Braves
Ryan Ward	Outfielder	Oklahoma City Dodgers (AAA)

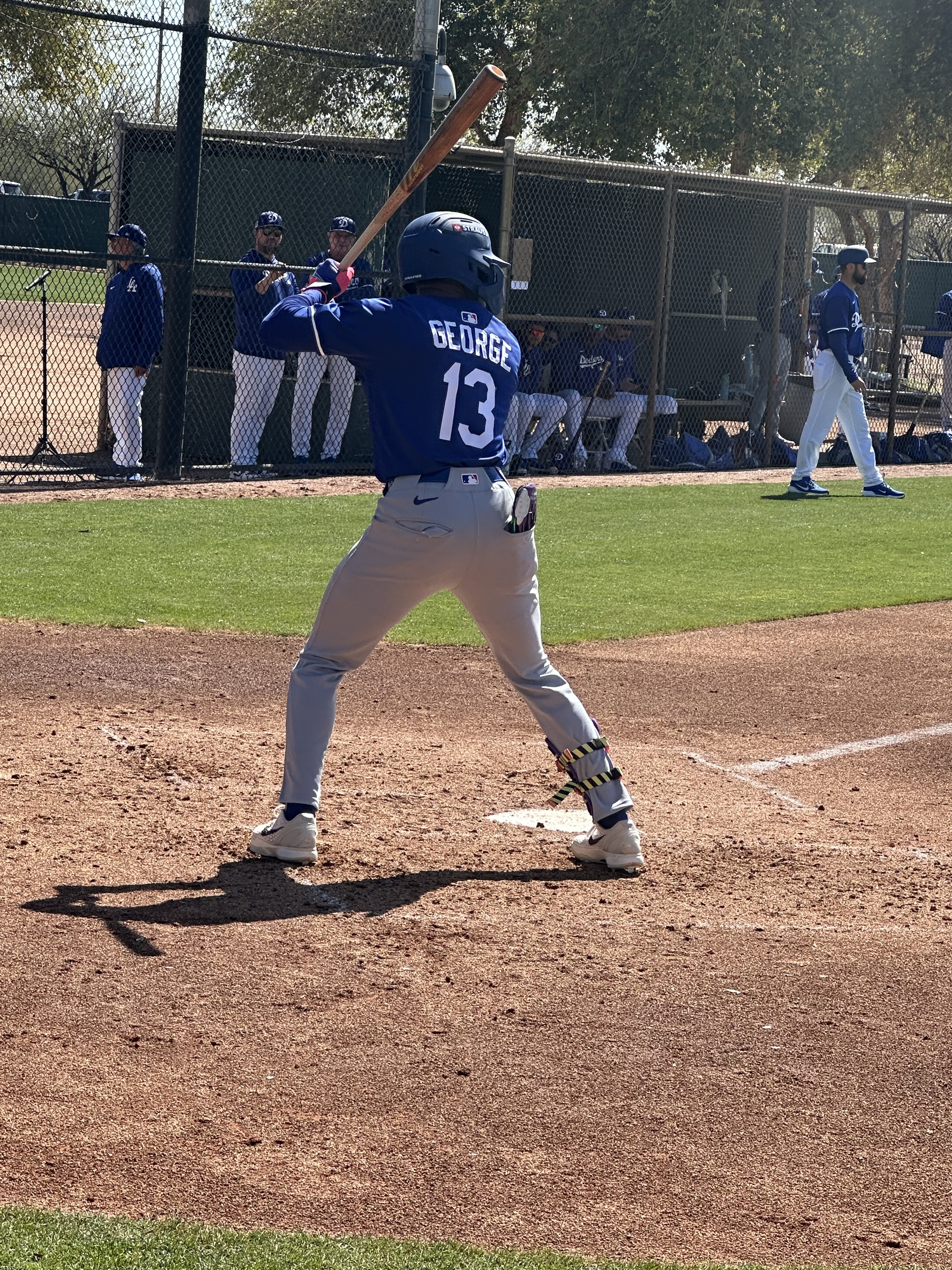
Dodgers prospect Kendall George bats in a minor league intra-squad game during spring training

The Dodgers began spring training on February 10, 2025, when pitchers and catchers reported to Camelback Ranch in Glendale, Arizona with the first full squad workout on February 15 and the first Cactus League game on February 20. During this time, they also re-signed manager Dave Roberts to a new four-year contract extension for $8 million per year, a new record for average annual value for a Major League manager. The deal would keep him under contract through the 2029 season.

On March 11, the Dodgers optioned infielder Hyeseong Kim to the minors after his bat was unable to adjust to major league pitching in spring training and also revealed that Dustin May had won the fifth starter job to open the season.

The Dodgers ended their Cactus League schedule on March 11 before flying to Japan to play two exhibition games (against the Hanshin Tigers and Yomiuri Giants of Nippon Professional Baseball) prior to beginning the season with the MLB Tokyo Series. Afterwards, they played the Los Angeles Angels in three Freeway Series exhibitions before resuming the regular season on March 27.

== Regular season ==
=== Season standings ===
==== National League West ====
NL West
Team	W	L	Pct.	GB	Home	Road
Los Angeles Dodgers	93	69	.574	—	52‍–‍29	41‍–‍40
San Diego Padres	90	72	.556	3	52‍–‍29	38‍–‍43
San Francisco Giants	81	81	.500	12	42‍–‍39	39‍–‍42
Arizona Diamondbacks	80	82	.494	13	43‍–‍38	37‍–‍44
Colorado Rockies	43	119	.265	50	25‍–‍56	18‍–‍63

==== National League Wild Card ====
Wild Card standings

Division leaders
Team	W	L	Pct.
Milwaukee Brewers	97	65	.599
Philadelphia Phillies	96	66	.593
Los Angeles Dodgers	93	69	.574

Wild Card teams (Top 3 teams qualify for postseason)
Team	W	L	Pct.	GB
Chicago Cubs	92	70	.568	+9
San Diego Padres	90	72	.556	+7
Cincinnati Reds	83	79	.512	—
New York Mets	83	79	.512	—
San Francisco Giants	81	81	.500	2
Arizona Diamondbacks	80	82	.494	3
Miami Marlins	79	83	.488	4
St. Louis Cardinals	78	84	.481	5
Atlanta Braves	76	86	.469	7
Pittsburgh Pirates	71	91	.438	12
Washington Nationals	66	96	.407	17
Colorado Rockies	43	119	.265	40

==== Record vs. opponents ====
NL Records

2025 National League record Source: MLB Standings Grid – 2025
Team	AZ	ATL	CHC	CIN	COL	LAD	MIA	MIL	NYM	PHI	PIT	SD	SF	STL	WSH	AL
Arizona	—	4–2	3–4	2–4	8–5	6–7	3–3	4–3	3–3	3–3	2–4	5–8	7–6	3–3	2–4	25–23
Atlanta	2–4	—	2–4	5–2	4–2	1–5	8–5	2–4	8–5	5–8	2–4	1–6	1–5	4–2	9–4	22–26
Chicago	4–3	4–2	—	5–8	5–1	4–3	4–2	7–6	2–4	2–4	10–3	3–3	1–5	8–5	3–3	30–18
Cincinnati	4–2	2–5	8–5	—	5–1	1–5	3–4	5–8	4–2	3–3	7–6	4–2	3–3	6–7	2–4	26–22
Colorado	5–8	2–4	1–5	1–5	—	2–11	3–3	2–4	0–6	0–7	2–4	3–10	2–11	4–2	4–3	12–36
Los Angeles	7–6	5–1	3–4	5–1	11–2	—	5–1	0–6	3–4	2–4	2–4	9–4	9–4	2–4	3–3	27–21
Miami	3–3	5–8	2–4	4–3	3–3	1–5	—	3–3	7–6	4–9	4–3	3–3	4–2	3–3	7–6	26–22
Milwaukee	3–4	4–2	6–7	8–5	4–2	6–0	3–3	—	4–2	4–2	10–3	2–4	2–5	7–6	6–0	28–20
New York	3–3	5–8	4–2	2–4	6–0	4–3	6–7	2–4	—	7–6	2–4	2–4	4–2	5–2	7–6	24–24
Philadelphia	3–3	8–5	4–2	3–3	7–0	4–2	9–4	2–4	6–7	—	3–3	3–3	3–4	2–4	8–5	31–17
Pittsburgh	4–2	4–2	3–10	6–7	4–2	4–2	3–4	3–10	4–2	3–3	—	1–5	4–2	7–6	4–3	17–31
San Diego	8–5	6–1	3–3	2–4	10–3	4–9	3–3	4–2	4–2	3–3	5–1	—	10–3	4–3	4–2	20–28
San Francisco	6–7	5–1	5–1	3–3	11–2	4–9	2–4	5–2	2–4	4–3	2–4	3–10	—	2–4	3–3	24–24
St. Louis	3–3	2–4	5–8	7–6	2–4	4–2	3–3	6–7	2–5	4–2	6–7	3–4	4–2	—	5–1	22–26
Washington	4–2	4–9	3–3	4–2	3–4	3–3	6–7	0–6	6–7	5–8	3–4	2–4	3–3	1–5	—	19–29

Updated with the results of all games through September 28, 2025.
NL vs. AL Records

2025 National League record vs. American League Source: MLB Standings
Team	ATH	BAL	BOS	CWS	CLE	DET	HOU	KC	LAA	MIN	NYY	SEA	TB	TEX	TOR
Arizona	2–1	2–1	2–1	2–1	2–1	0–3	0–3	1–2	1–2	2–1	2–1	3–0	1–2	4–2	1–2
Atlanta	1–2	0–3	3–3	2–1	3–0	3–0	1–2	1–2	1–2	3–0	1–2	1–2	1–2	0–3	1–2
Chicago	3–0	2–1	2–1	5–1	3–0	1–2	1–2	1–2	3–0	1–2	2–1	1–2	2–1	2–1	1–2
Cincinnati	0–3	2–1	1–2	1–2	5–1	2–1	1–2	2–1	2–1	2–1	2–1	1–2	3–0	1–2	1–2
Colorado	1–2	1–2	0–3	1–2	1–2	0–3	2–4	0–3	2–1	2–1	1–2	0–3	1–2	0–3	0–3
Los Angeles	2–1	1–2	1–2	3–0	2–1	3–0	0–3	2–1	0–6	2–1	2–1	3–0	2–1	2–1	2–1
Miami	1–2	2–1	1–2	1–2	1–2	2–1	1–2	2–1	2–1	2–1	3–0	1–2	3–3	3–0	1–2
Milwaukee	2–1	2–1	3–0	2–1	1–2	2–1	2–1	2–1	3–0	4–2	0–3	2–1	1–2	0–3	2–1
New York	2–1	1–2	1–2	2–1	0–3	2–1	1–2	2–1	3–0	1–2	3–3	2–1	0–3	1–2	3–0
Philadelphia	2–1	2–1	2–1	1–2	2–1	2–1	0–3	2–1	1–2	2–1	2–1	3–0	3–0	3–0	4–2
Pittsburgh	2–1	0–3	2–1	0–3	0–3	4–2	1–2	0–3	2–1	1–2	1–2	0–3	1–2	1–2	2–1
San Diego	2–1	0–3	2–1	2–1	3–0	1–2	1–2	2–1	2–1	1–2	1–2	1–5	0–3	2–1	0–3
San Francisco	5–1	2–1	2–1	1–2	1–2	0–3	3–0	1–2	1–2	0–3	2–1	3–0	1–2	2–1	0–3
St. Louis	2–1	2–1	0–3	3–0	3–0	1–2	2–1	3–3	1–2	3–0	0–3	0–3	1–2	1–2	0–3
Washington	1–2	5–1	0–3	1–2	1–2	2–1	1–2	1–2	2–1	2–1	0–3	2–1	0–3	1–2	0–3

Updated with the results of all games through September 28, 2025.

=== Game log ===
Legend
	Dodgers win
	Dodgers loss
	Postponement
	Clinched playoff spot
	Clinched division
**Bold**	Dodgers team member

2025 Game Log: 93–69 (Home: 52–29; Away: 41–40)
March/April: 21–10 (Home: 15–3; Away: 6–7)

#	Date	Opponent	Score	Win	Loss	Save	Attendance	Record
1	March 18	@ Cubs*	**W** 4–1	**Yamamoto** (1–0)	Brown (0–1)	**Scott** (1)	42,365	1–0
2	March 19	@ Cubs*	**W** 6–3	**Knack** (1–0)	Steele (0–1)	**Vesia** (1)	42,367	2–0
3	March 27	Tigers	**W** 5–4	**Snell** (1–0)	Skubal (0–1)	**Treinen** (1)	53,595	3–0
4	March 28	Tigers	**W** 8–5 (10)	**García** (1–0)	Brieske (0–1)	—	52,029	4–0
5	March 29	Tigers	**W** 7–3	**Banda** (1–0)	Olson (0–1)	—	51,788	5–0
6	March 31	Braves	**W** 6–1	**Glasnow** (1–0)	Holmes (0–1)	—	50,816	6–0
7	April 1	Braves	**W** 3–1	**Banda** (2–0)	Sale (0–1)	**Scott** (2)	50,182	7–0
8	April 2	Braves	**W** 6–5	**Dreyer** (1–0)	Iglesias (0–1)	—	50,281	8–0
9	April 4	@ Phillies	L 2–3	Luzardo (2–0)	**Yamamoto** (1–1)	Romano (1)	43,024	8–1
10	April 5	@ Phillies	**W** 3–1	**Banda** (3–0)	Nola (0–2)	**Scott** (3)	44,404	9–1
11	April 6	@ Phillies	L 7–8	Kerkering (1–0)	**Treinen** (0–1)	Alvarado (2)	44,098	9–2
12	April 7	@ Nationals	L 4–6	Gore (1–1)	**May** (0–1)	Finnegan (4)	22,546	9–3
13	April 8	@ Nationals	L 2–8	Poche (1–2)	**Wrobleski** (0–1)	—	24,847	9–4
14	April 9	@ Nationals	**W** 6–5	**Yates** (1–0)	Salazar (0–1)	**Treinen** (2)	21,014	10–4
15	April 11	Cubs	**W** 3–0	**Yamamoto** (2–1)	Boyd (1–1)	**Scott** (4)	53,933	11–4
16	April 12	Cubs	L 0–16	Brown (2–1)	**Sasaki** (0–1)	—	53,887	11–5
17	April 13	Cubs	L 2–4	Roberts (1–0)	**Treinen** (0–2)	Pressly (4)	50,899	11–6
18	April 14	Rockies	**W** 5–3	**May** (1–1)	Senzatela (0–3)	**Scott** (5)	52,693	12–6
19	April 15	Rockies	**W** 6–2	**Dreyer** (2–0)	Feltner (0–1)	—	53,198	13–6
20	April 16	Rockies	**W** 8–7	**Casparius** (1–0)	Márquez (0–3)	**Scott** (6)	52,143	14–6
21	April 18	@ Rangers	**W** 3–0	**Yamamoto** (3–1)	deGrom (0–1)	**Scott** (7)	38,623	15–6
22	April 19	@ Rangers	L 3–4	Webb (2–0)	**Yates** (1–1)	—	39,244	15–7
23	April 20	@ Rangers	**W** 1–0	**Casparius** (2–0)	Martin (0–3)	**Scott** (8)	38,110	16–7
24	April 22	@ Cubs	L 10–11 (10)	Hodge (2–0)	**Davis** (0–1)	—	36,425	16–8
25	April 23	@ Cubs	L 6–7	Boyd (2–2)	**Dreyer** (2–1)	Hodge (1)	37,150	16–9
26	April 25	Pirates	L 0–3	Skenes (3–2)	**Yamamoto** (3–2)	Bednar (2)	53,655	16–10
27	April 26	Pirates	**W** 8–4	**Yates** (2–1)	Holderman (0–1)	—	54,012	17–10
28	April 27	Pirates	**W** 9–2	**Casparius** (3–0)	Falter (1–3)	**Gómez** (1)	49,512	18–10
29	April 28	Marlins	**W** 7–6 (10)	**Yates** (3–1)	Henríquez (1–1)	—	48,232	19–10
30	April 29	Marlins	**W** 15–2	**Sauer** (1–0)	Alcántara (2–3)	—	46,502	20–10
31	April 30	Marlins	**W** 12–7	**Gonsolin** (1–0)	Quantrill (2–3)	—	47,192	21–10
*March 18 and 19 games played at Tokyo Dome in Tokyo, Japan

May: 15–12 (Home: 6–5; Road: 9–7)

#	Date	Opponent	Score	Win	Loss	Save	Attendance	Record
32	May 2	@ Braves	**W** 2–1	**Yamamoto** (4–2)	Holmes (2–2)	**Phillips** (1)	41,201	22–10
33	May 3	@ Braves	**W** 10–3	**Sasaki** (1–1)	Schwellenbach (1–3)	—	42,159	23–10
34	May 4	@ Braves	L 3–4	Elder (2–1)	**May** (1–2)	Iglesias (6)	39,649	23–11
35	May 5	@ Marlins	**W** 7–4	**Casparius** (4–0)	Alcántara (2–4)	**Yates** (1)	15,395	24–11
36	May 6	@ Marlins	L 4–5 (10)	Tinoco (2–0)	**Feyereisen** (0–2)	—	17,312	24–12
37	May 7	@ Marlins	**W** 10–1	**Knack** (2–0)	Gibson (0–1)	**Sauer** (1)	13,635	25–12
38	May 8	@ Diamondbacks	L 3–5	Pfaadt (6–2)	**Yamamoto** (4–3)	Ginkel (1)	40,319	25–13
39	May 9	@ Diamondbacks	**W** 14–11	**Vesia** (1–0)	Ginkel (0–1)	**Scott** (9)	49,122	26–13
40	May 10	@ Diamondbacks	L 0–3	Burnes (2–1)	**May** (1–3)	Nelson (1)	47,106	26–14
41	May 11	@ Diamondbacks	**W** 8–1	**Gonsolin** (2–0)	Gallen (3–5)	—	46,292	27–14
42	May 13	Athletics	L 1–11	Springs (5–3)	**Knack** (2–1)	—	45,161	27–15
43	May 14	Athletics	**W** 9–3	**Yamamoto** (5–3)	Hoglund (1–1)	—	50,071	28–15
44	May 15	Athletics	**W** 19–2	**Wrobleski** (1–1)	Bido (2–4)	—	51,272	29–15
45	May 16	Angels	L 2–6	Kochanowicz (3–5)	**May** (1–4)	—	46,273	29–16
46	May 17	Angels	L 9–11	Detmers (1–2)	**Yates** (3–2)	Jansen (8)	50,084	29–17
47	May 18	Angels	L 4–6	Anderson (1–0)	**Banda** (3–1)	—	51,997	29–18
48	May 19	Diamondbacks	L 5–9	Pfaadt (7–3)	**Dreyer** (2–2)	Miller (5)	41,372	29–19
49	May 20	Diamondbacks	**W** 4–3 (10)	**Banda** (4–1)	Miller (3–1)	—	51,932	30–19
50	May 21	Diamondbacks	**W** 3–1	**May** (2–4)	Burnes (3–2)	**Scott** (10)	43,517	31–19
51	May 23	@ Mets	**W** 7–5 (13)	**García** (2–0)	Brazobán (3–1)	—	40,449	32–19
52	May 24	@ Mets	L 2–5	Peterson (3–2)	**Gonsolin** (2–1)	Díaz (11)	41,332	32–20
53	May 25	@ Mets	L 1–3	Senga (5–3)	**Knack** (2–2)	Garrett (1)	41,917	32–21
54	May 26	@ Guardians	**W** 7–2	**Yamamoto** (6–3)	Williams (4–3)	—	34,711	33–21
55	May 27	@ Guardians	**W** 9–5	**May** (3–4)	Bibee (4–5)	—	25,422	34–21
56	May 28	@ Guardians	L 4–7	Festa (1–0)	**Scott** (0–1)	Clase (11)	23,381	34–22
57	May 30	Yankees	**W** 8–5	**Gonsolin** (3–1)	Fried (7–1)	**Vesia** (2)	53,276	35–22
58	May 31	Yankees	**W** 18–2	**Knack** (3–2)	Warren (3–3)	—	51,746	36–22

June: 17–10 (Home: 9–6; Road: 8–4)

#	Date	Opponent	Score	Win	Loss	Save	Attendance	Record
59	June 1	Yankees	L 3–7	Yarbrough (3–0)	**Yamamoto** (6–4)	—	54,031	36–23
60	June 2	Mets	L 3–4 (10)	Díaz (3–0)	**Scott** (0–2)	Buttó (1)	48,556	36–24
61	June 3	Mets	**W** 6–5 (10)	**Scott** (1–2)	Buttó (2–1)	—	53,424	37–24
62	June 4	Mets	L 1–6	Canning (6–2)	**Gonsolin** (3–2)	—	45,733	37–25
63	June 5	Mets	**W** 6–5	**Vesia** (2–0)	Garrett (1–2)	**Scott** (11)	46,364	38–25
64	June 6	@ Cardinals	L 0–5	Gray (7–1)	**Wrobleski** (1–2)	—	40,071	38–26
65	June 7	@ Cardinals	L 1–2	Helsley (3–0)	**Casparius** (4–1)	—	37,465	38–27
66	June 8	@ Cardinals	**W** 7–3	**Kershaw** (1–0)	McGreevy (1–1)	—	42,255	39–27
67	June 9	@ Padres	**W** 8–7 (10)	**Yates** (4–2)	Peralta (3–1)	**Scott** (12)	45,678	40–27
68	June 10	@ Padres	L 1–11	Cease (2–5)	**Sauer** (1–1)	—	45,084	40–28
69	June 11	@ Padres	**W** 5–2	**Trivino** (2–0)	Morejón (3–3)	**Vesia** (3)	45,481	41–28
70	June 13	Giants	L 2–6	Webb (6–5)	**Yamamoto** (6–5)	—	53,022	41–29
71	June 14	Giants	**W** 11–5	**Kershaw** (2–0)	Roupp (4–5)	—	51,548	42–29
72	June 15	Giants	**W** 5–4	**May** (4–4)	Lucchesi (0–1)	**Scott** (13)	53,980	43–29
73	June 16	Padres	**W** 6–3	**Casparius** (5–1)	Cease (2–6)	**Yates** (2)	53,207	44–29
74	June 17	Padres	**W** 8–6	**Sauer** (2–1)	Estrada (2–4)	**Scott** (14)	51,555	45–29
75	June 18	Padres	**W** 4–3	**Wrobleski** (2–2)	Suárez (1–3)	—	53,568	46–29
76	June 19	Padres	L 3–5	Morejón (4–3)	**Yamamoto** (6–6)	Matsui (1)	53,280	46–30
77	June 20	Nationals	**W** 6–5	**Kershaw** (3–0)	Gore (3–7)	**Scott** (15)	46,558	47–30
78	June 21	Nationals	L 3–7	Irvin (6–3)	**May** (4–5)	—	54,154	47–31
79	June 22	Nationals	**W** 13–7	**Casparius** (6–1)	Ferrer (2–3)	—	48,177	48–31
80	June 24	@ Rockies	**W** 9–7	**Wrobleski** (3–2)	Márquez (3–9)	**Scott** (16)	36,492	49–31
81	June 25	@ Rockies	**W** 8–1	**Yamamoto** (7–6)	Dollander (2–8)	—	43,881	50–31
82	June 26	@ Rockies	**W** 3–1	**Kershaw** (4–0)	Chivilli (1–3)	**Scott** (17)	38,091	51–31
83	June 27	@ Royals	**W** 5–4	**Trivino** (3–0)	Cameron (2–4)	**Scott** (18)	35,187	52–31
84	June 28	@ Royals	L 5–9	Lugo (5–5)	**Casparius** (6–2)	—	36,578	52–32
85	June 29	@ Royals	**W** 5–1	**Wrobleski** (4–2)	Bubic (6–6)	—	28,671	53–32

July: 10–14 (Home: 5–7; Road: 5–7)

#	Date	Opponent	Score	Win	Loss	Save	Attendance	Record
86	July 1	White Sox	**W** 6–1	**Yamamoto** (8–6)	Smith (3–6)	—	51,368	54–32
87	July 2	White Sox	**W** 5–4	**Klein** (1–0)	Taylor (0–1)	—	53,536	55–32
88	July 3	White Sox	**W** 6–2	**May** (5–5)	Civale (1–5)	—	53,530	56–32
89	July 4	Astros	L 1–18	McCullers Jr. (2–3)	**Casparius** (6–3)	Alexander (1)	53,377	56–33
90	July 5	Astros	L 4–6	Valdez (10–4)	**Wrobleski** (4–3)	Hader (25)	49,744	56–34
91	July 6	Astros	L 1–5	Gusto (6–3)	**Klein** (1–1)	—	41,291	56–35
92	July 7	@ Brewers	L 1–9	Peralta (10–4)	**Yamamoto** (8–7)	—	35,365	56–36
93	July 8	@ Brewers	L 1–3	Misiorowski (4–1)	**Kershaw** (4–1)	Megill (21)	38,175	56–37
94	July 9	@ Brewers	L 2–3 (10)	Megill (2–2)	**Yates** (4–3)	—	33,607	56–38
95	July 11	@ Giants	L 7–8	Webb (9–6)	**May** (5–6)	Doval (15)	40,785	56–39
96	July 12	@ Giants	**W** 2–1	**Sheehan** (1–0)	Roupp (6–6)	**Scott** (19)	41,029	57–39
97	July 13	@ Giants	**W** 5–2 (11)	**Casparius** (7–3)	Bivens (2–3)	—	41,048	58–39
–	July 15	95th All-Star Game	American League vs. National League (Truist Park, Cumberland, Georgia)					
98	July 18	Brewers	L 0–2	Priester (8–2)	**Glasnow** (1–1)	Megill (22)	49,821	58–40
99	July 19	Brewers	L 7–8	Peralta (12–4)	**Sheehan** (0–2)	Megill (23)	53,540	58–41
100	July 20	Brewers	L 5–6	Quintana (7–3)	**Trivino** (3–1)	Uribe (2)	40,376	58–42
101	July 21	Twins	**W** 5–2	**May** (6–6)	Festa (3–4)	**Yates** (3)	51,121	59–42
102	July 22	Twins	L 7–10	Stewart (2–1)	**Casparius** (7–4)	—	45,074	59–43
103	July 23	Twins	**W** 4–3	**Banda** (5–1)	Jax (1–5)	—	40,094	60–43
104	July 25	@ Red Sox	**W** 5–2	**Sheehan** (2–1)	Bello (6–5)	**Casparius** (1)	36,369	61–43
105	July 26	@ Red Sox	L 2–4	Crochet (12–4)	**Kershaw** (4–2)	Chapman (17)	36,687	61–44
106	July 27	@ Red Sox	L 3–4	Bernardino (4–2)	**May** (6–7)	Hicks (2)	35,465	61–45
107	July 28	@ Reds	**W** 5–2	**Yamamoto** (9–7)	Burns (0–3)	**Dreyer** (1)	33,589	62–45
108	July 29	@ Reds	**W** 5–4	**Díaz** (1–0)	Pagán (2–3)	**Vesia** (4)	36,135	63–45
109	July 30	@ Reds	L 2–5	Barlow (4–0)	**Sheehan** (2–2)	Santillan (3)	32,976	63–46

August: 15–13 (Home: 10–5; Road: 5–8)

#	Date	Opponent	Score	Win	Loss	Save	Attendance	Record
110	August 1	@ Rays	**W** 5–0	**Kershaw** (5–2)	Baz (8–8)	**Wrobleski** (1)	10,046	64–46
111	August 2	@ Rays	L 0–4	Rasmussen (9–5)	**Snell** (1–1)	—	10,046	64–47
112	August 3	@ Rays	**W** 3–0	**Yamamoto** (10–7)	Englert (0–1)	**Casparius** (2)	10,046	65–47
113	August 4	Cardinals	L 2–3	O'Brien (1–0)	**Stewart** (2–2)	Romero (2)	46,628	65–48
114	August 5	Cardinals	**W** 12–6	**Sheehan** (3–2)	Mikolas (6–9)	—	50,477	66–48
115	August 6	Cardinals	L 3–5	Romero (4–3)	**Vesia** (2–1)	O'Brien (1)	44,621	66–49
116	August 8	Blue Jays	**W** 5–1	**Kershaw** (6–2)	Scherzer (2–2)	—	53,825	67–49
117	August 9	Blue Jays	**W** 9–1	**Snell** (2–1)	Bassitt (11–6)	—	44,727	68–49
118	August 10	Blue Jays	L 4–5	Hoffman (7–4)	**Vesia** (2–2)	Fluharty (1)	41,557	68–50
119	August 11	@ Angels	L 4–7	Soriano (8–9)	**Yamamoto** (10–8)	Jansen (22)	44,571	68–51
120	August 12	@ Angels	L 6–7 (10)	Brogdon (3–1)	**Casparius** (7–5)	—	44,741	68–52
121	August 13	@ Angels	L 5–6	Burke (6–1)	**Wrobleski** (4–4)	Jansen (23)	44,893	68–53
122	August 15	Padres	**W** 3–2	**Kershaw** (7–2)	Vásquez (3–6)	**Dreyer** (2)	53,119	69–53
123	August 16	Padres	**W** 6–0	**Snell** (3–1)	Cease (5–11)	—	53,606	70–53
124	August 17	Padres	**W** 5–4	**Vesia** (3–2)	Suárez (4–5)	—	48,189	71–53
125	August 18	@ Rockies	L 3–4	Vodnik (4–3)	**Wrobleski** (4–5)	—	27,259	71–54
126	August 19	@ Rockies	**W** 11–4	**Sheehan** (4–2)	Gomber (0–7)	—	25,480	72–54
127	August 20	@ Rockies	L 3–8	Gordon (4–5)	**Ohtani** (0–1)	—	35,240	72–55
128	August 21	@ Rockies	**W** 9–5	**Kershaw** (8–2)	Dollander (2–10)	—	28,305	73–55
129	August 22	@ Padres	L 1–2	Darvish (3–3)	**Snell** (3–2)	Suárez (34)	44,864	73–56
130	August 23	@ Padres	L 1–5	Cortés Jr. (2–2)	**Glasnow** (1–2)	Morejón (3)	46,326	73–57
131	August 24	@ Padres	**W** 8–2	**Yamamoto** (11–8)	Estrada (4–5)	—	43,827	74–57
132	August 25	Reds	**W** 7–0	**Sheehan** (5–2)	Greene (5–4)	—	49,702	75–57
133	August 26	Reds	**W** 6–3	**Kershaw** (9–2)	Martinez (10–10)	**Scott** (20)	44,943	76–57
134	August 27	Reds	**W** 5–1	**Ohtani** (1–1)	Lodolo (8–7)	—	49,199	77–57
135	August 29	Diamondbacks	L 0–3	Gallen (10–13)	**Snell** (3–3)	Woodford (2)	45,701	77–58
136	August 30	Diamondbacks	L 1–6	Rodríguez (6–8)	**Glasnow** (1–3)	—	47,632	77–59
137	August 31	Diamondbacks	**W** 5–4	**Treinen** (1–2)	Curtiss (2–1)	—	51,803	78–59

September: 15–10 (Home: 7–3; Road: 8–7)

#	Date	Opponent	Score	Win	Loss	Save	Attendance	Record
138	September 2	@ Pirates	L 7–9	Chandler (2–0)	**Henriquez** (0–1)	Santana (12)	14,330	78–60
139	September 3	@ Pirates	L 0–3	Burrows (2–4)	**Sheehan** (5–3)	Santana (13)	16,473	78–61
140	September 4	@ Pirates	L 3–5	Skenes (10–9)	**Snell** (3–4)	Holderman (1)	20,563	78–62
141	September 5	@ Orioles	L 1–2	Canó (3–6)	**Scott** (1–3)	—	25,481	78–63
142	September 6	@ Orioles	L 3–4	Suárez (1–0)	**Treinen** (1–3)	—	42,612	78–64
143	September 7	@ Orioles	**W** 5–2	**Kershaw** (10–2)	Sugano (10–8)	**Dreyer** (3)	27,874	79–64
144	September 8	Rockies	**W** 3–1	**Glasnow** (2–3)	Chivilli (1–5)	**Scott** (21)	48,433	80–64
145	September 9	Rockies	**W** 7–2	**Sheehan** (6–3)	Márquez (3–13)	—	44,126	81–64
146	September 10	Rockies	**W** 9–0	**Snell** (4–4)	Freeland (4–15)	—	50,805	82–64
147	September 12	@ Giants	L 1–5 (10)	Peguero (2–0)	**Treinen** (1–4)	—	40,509	82–65
148	September 13	@ Giants	**W** 13–7	**Henriquez** (1–1)	Webb (14–10)	—	40,474	83–65
149	September 14	@ Giants	**W** 10–2	**Glasnow** (3–3)	Ray (11–7)	—	40,112	84–65
150	September 15	Phillies	L 5–6 (10)	Durán (7–6)	**Treinen** (1–5)	Robertson (1)	43,002	84–66
151	September 16	Phillies	L 6–9	Banks (6–2)	**Treinen** (1–6)	Durán (31)	44,063	84–67
152	September 17	Phillies	**W** 5–0	**Snell** (5–4)	Luzardo (14–7)	—	50,869	85–67
153	September 18	Giants	**W** 2–1	**Dreyer** (3–2)	Webb (14–11)	**Vesia** (5)	41,225	86–67
154	September 19	Giants	**W** 6–3	**Henriquez** (2–1)	Ray (11–8)	**Scott** (22)	53,037	87–67
155	September 20	Giants	**W** 7–5	**Glasnow** (4–3)	Peguero (3–1)	**Dreyer** (4)	53,251	88–67
156	September 21	Giants	L 1–3	Bivens (4–3)	**Treinen** (1–7)	Walker (16)	46,601	88–68
157	September 23	@ Diamondbacks	L 4–5	Thompson (3–2)	**Scott** (1–4)	—	42,882	88–69
158	September 24	@ Diamondbacks	**W** 5–4 (11)	**Treinen** (2–7)	Garcia (0–2)	**Wrobleski** (2)	43,417	89–69
159	September 25	@ Diamondbacks	**W** 8–0	**Yamamoto** (12–8)	Beeks (5–3)	—	34,952	90–69
160	September 26	@ Mariners	**W** 3–2	**Wrobleski** (5–5)	Kirby (10–8)	**Scott** (23)	45,458	91–69
161	September 27	@ Mariners	**W** 5–3	**Vesia** (4–2)	Muñoz (3–3)	**Henriquez** (1)	45,701	92–69
162	September 28	@ Mariners	**W** 6–1	**Kershaw** (11–2)	Miller (4–6)	**Knack** (1)	45,658	93–69

=== Season summary ===
Opening Day starting lineup
No.	Player	Pos.
Batters
17	Shohei Ohtani	DH
25	Tommy Edman	2B
37	Teoscar Hernández	RF
16	Will Smith	C
13	Max Muncy	3B
8	Kiké Hernández	1B
23	Michael Conforto	LF
72	Miguel Rojas	SS
44	Andy Pages	CF
Starting pitcher
18	Yoshinobu Yamamoto	

=== March ===
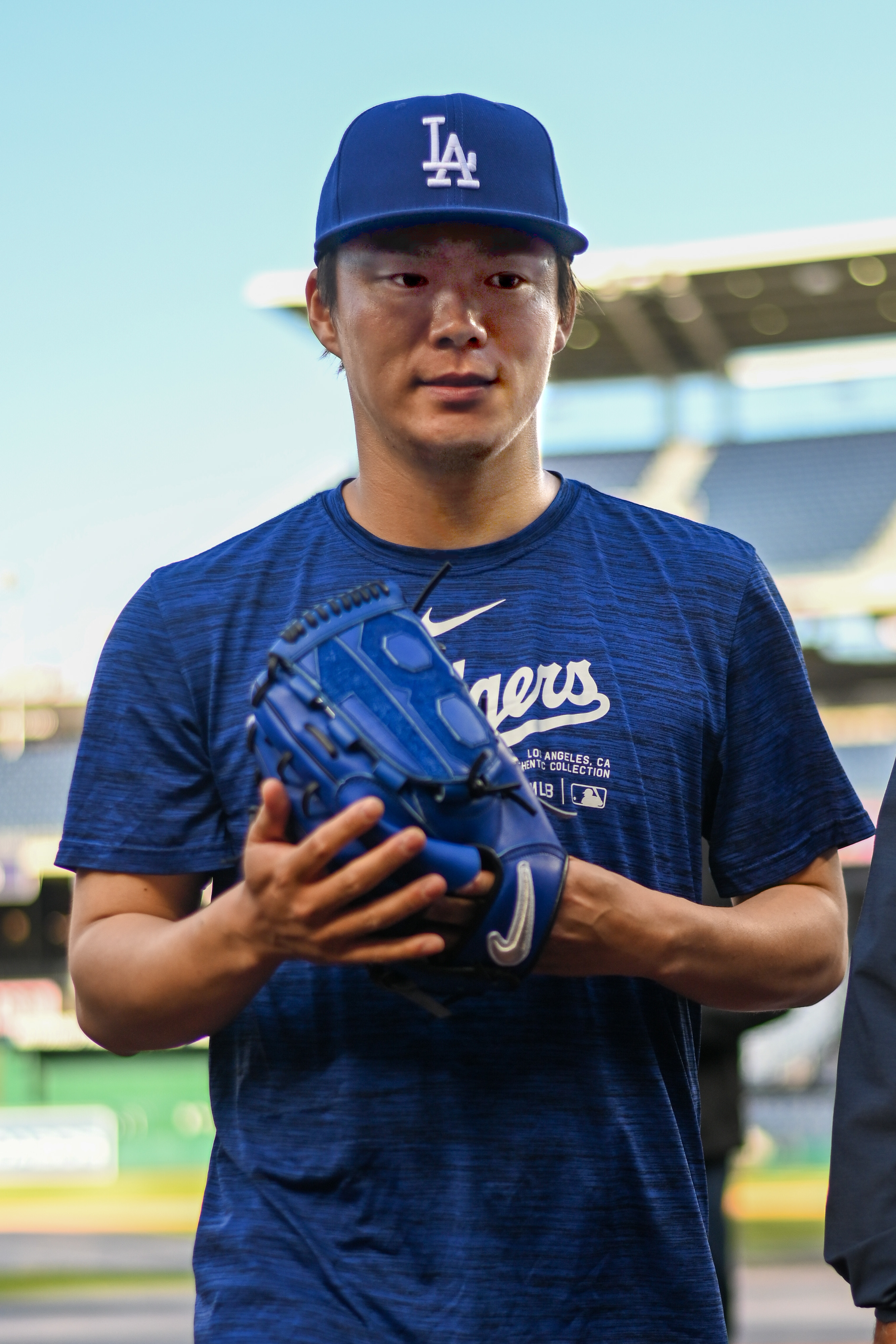
Yoshinobu Yamamoto was the Dodgers opening day starter.

The Dodgers opened their season on March 18 against the Chicago Cubs at the Tokyo Dome in Japan as part of the MLB Tokyo Series, the second straight year they had started overseas after playing in Seoul, South Korea to start the 2024 season. Yoshinobu Yamamoto made the start in his home country, facing Shota Imanaga, the first opening day matchup between two Japanese pitchers in MLB history. Yamamoto allowed only one run on three hits in five innings. Shohei Ohtani had two hits, including a double, and scored two runs as the Dodgers started the season with a 4–1 victory. In the next game, Roki Sasaki made his major league debut, allowing one run in three innings, while walking five batters. Ohtani, Kiké Hernández, and Tommy Edman homered, and the Dodgers finished the series with a 6–3 win.

The Dodgers returned to Dodger Stadium and began the rest of the schedule on March 27 with a three-game series against the Detroit Tigers. Blake Snell started the home opener, allowing two runs in five innings of work, while the Dodgers hit three more home runs in a 5–4 win. In the next game, Yamamoto struck out 10 batters in five innings, while allowing two solo home runs. Mookie Betts hit two home runs, including a walk-off in the 10th inning as the Dodgers won again, 8–5. Sasaki again struggled in his second start of the season, on March 29, allowing three hits while walking four batters in only 1/2 innings. However, the Dodgers hit three more home runs en route to sweeping the Tigers with a 7–3 win. They played the Atlanta Braves in the next series, and Tyler Glasnow began his season by pitching by pitching five shutout innings while striking out eight in the Dodgers 6–1 win. The Dodgers' six-game winning streak to start the season matched their best mark since moving to Los Angeles in 1958, joining the 1981 season.

=== April ===
They won again the next day, 3–1. Dustin May made his first start since the middle of the 2023 season, after recovering from multiple surgeries, and only allowed one hit while striking out six in five innings. The Dodgers matched the 1933 New York Yankees as the only returning champions to start the season with seven wins. Blake Snell struggled in his second start, walking four and allowing five runs in four innings, aided by three Dodger errors. The Dodgers came back and Max Muncy tied the game in the eighth with a two-run double and then Shohei Ohtani won it with a walk-off home run in the ninth to keep the streak alive.

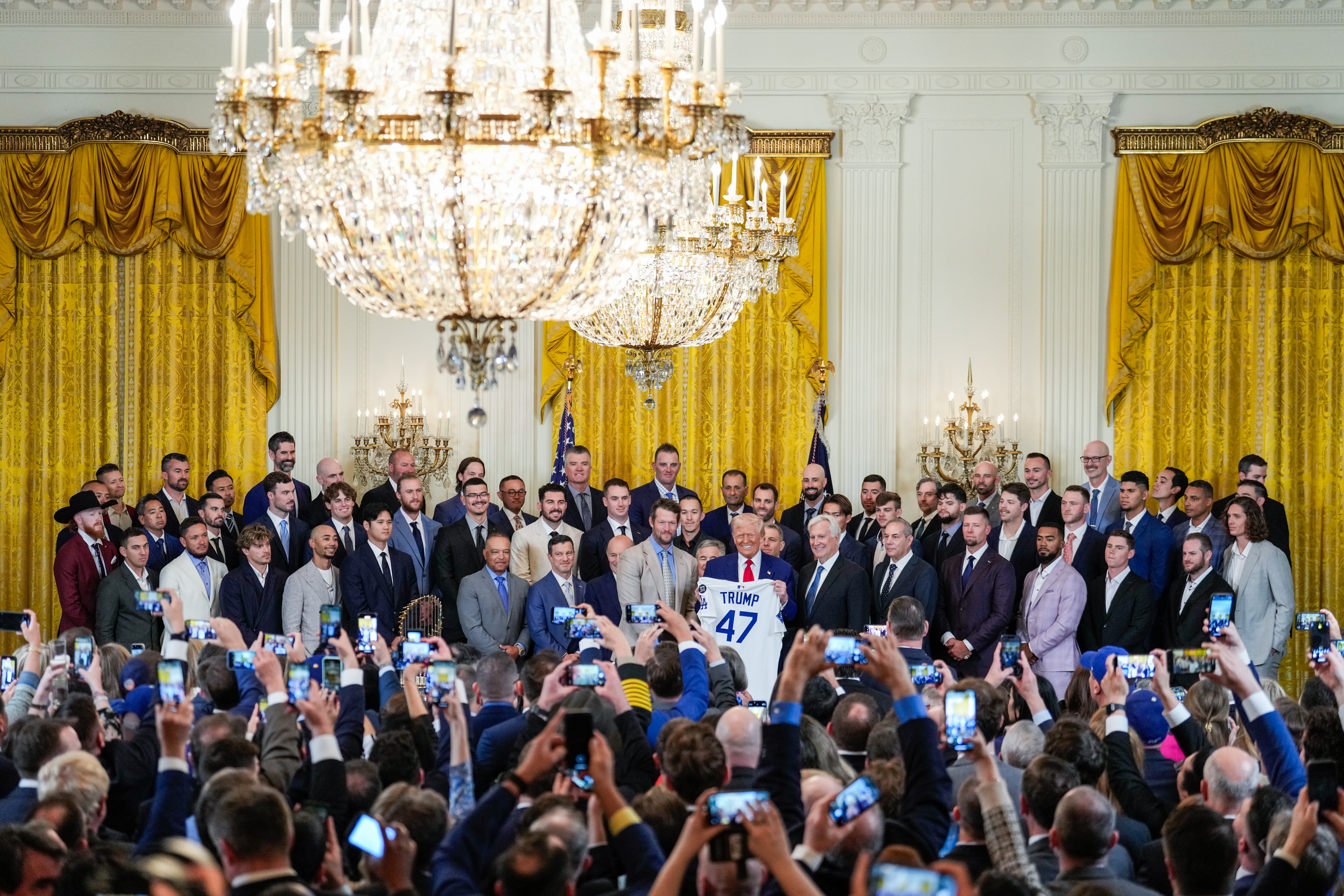
Los Angeles Dodgers visited the White House on April 7, 2025

The first road trip of the season began on April 4 at Citizens Bank Park against the Philadelphia Phillies. Yoshinobu Yamamoto again pitched well in his third start, allowing only one unearned run in six innings but the Dodgers lost their first game of the season, 3–2. Roki Sasaki improved in his third start of the season the next day, walking only two in four innings while allowing only one run and striking out four. Home runs by Kiké Hernández and Michael Conforto helped the Dodgers to a 3–1 win. In the final game of the series, Tyler Glasnow walked five batters and left the bases loaded in the third which led to a Nick Castellanos grand-slam home run. The Dodgers came back, thanks to Teoscar Hernández, who hit two home runs, a double, and drove in five runs himself. However, the Phillies won the game 8–7, scoring the winning run on a RBI single by Bryson Stott in the seventh inning. The Dodgers next series was at Nationals Park against the Washington Nationals. Dustin May got the start in the opener, allowing only one earned run in six innings, while Ohtani fell a double short of the cycle. However, the Dodgers lost their second game in a row when James Wood hit a two-run home run in the seventh inning as the Nationals won the game 6–4. The next day, Justin Wrobleski was called up from the minors to make a spot start and he was bad, allowing eight runs on eight hits, including two home runs by Wood, in five innings, as the Dodgers losing streak continued with a 8–2 loss. Landon Knack made a sport start also, the following day, giving up five runs on four hits and four walks in only 2 1/3 innings. The Dodgers, thanks to homers by Teoscar Hernández and Andy Pages, came back to win 6–5 to end the losing streak and finish the road trip.

The Dodgers returned home on April 11 to play the Chicago Cubs. Yamamoto struck out nine while only allowing two hits and one walk in six scoreless innings, while a three-run home run from Tommy Edman provided all the scoring in a 3–0 win, their 10th straight at home. Sasaki managed to get through five innings in his next start, while allowing only one run. However, the Dodgers offense could manage nothing against Cubs starter Ben Brown, who shut them down in six innings while the Cubs teed off on Dodgers relievers Ben Casparius and Luis García, and handed the Dodgers their worst home shutout loss in franchise history, 16–0. The Cubs handed the Dodgers their third straight series loss with a 4–2 win in the finale. Pete Crow-Armstrong had two homers and a triple in the game. The following series was against the Colorado Rockies. Dustin May struck out seven while only allowing one run on three hits in six innings of the opener. Mookie Betts and Ohtani each homered in the game, while producing five hits between them in a 5–3 win. In the next game, Will Smith had two hits, a homerun and drove in three runs and Edman had four hits in five at-bats as the Dodgers won 6–2. In the final game of the homestand, the Dodgers scored seven runs in the first inning, which included home runs by Ohtani and Freddie Freeman. However, Michael Toglia hit a grand slam homer off fill-in starter Bobby Miller in the third inning to make the game close before the Dodgers held-on to win 8–7 and complete the sweep of the Rockies.

Yamamoto had another strong start in the opener of the next road trip, at Globe Life Field against the Texas Rangers, pitching seven shutout innings with 10 strikeouts. The Dodgers got one run, a solo home run in the first by Edman, off Jacob deGrom, who pitched seven innings for the Rangers, before adding two more against the bullpen for a 3–0 win. In the next game, Sasaki allowed two runs in six innings and the Dodgers, thanks to a Freeman home run took a 3–2 lead into the ninth inning, only to lose the game on a two-run walk-off home run by Adolis García. In the series finale, the Dodgers could only manage two hits in seven innings against Tyler Mahle but their pitchers matched him with scoreless innings. Will Smith scored the only run of the game on a sacrifice fly by Freeman in the eighth inning for a 1–0 victory and a series win. Next up was a two-game series against the Cubs at Wrigley Field on April 22 and 23. Edman hit a three-run home run in the top of the first to put the Dodgers ahead early, but May struggled and allowed the Cubs to get five back in the bottom of the inning. The Dodgers used a five run inning of their own in the seventh to take a 10–7 lead only to blow it when Kyle Tucker hit a two-run homer in the eighth and Miguel Amaya hit a game-tying home run in the ninth. Ian Happ drove in the winning run in the 10th inning as the Cubs took the game 11–10. The Cubs won again the next day, 7–6, with a three-run home run by Pete Crow-Armstrong in the fifth inning putting them ahead.

Back home on April 25 to play the Pittsburgh Pirates, the Dodgers continued to struggle, and were shut out by Paul Skenes and the Pirates, 3–0. In the next game, Ohtani had three hits, including two doubles, and both Teoscar Hernández and Kiké Hernández homered as the Dodgers won 8–4. They won again the next day, 9–2, to win the series. Andy Pages had four hits, including a home run, in the game. The Miami Marlins came to town next for a three-game series. The Dodgers got out to a 5–0 lead, which included a Teoscar Hernández two-run home run in the fifth, only for the Marlins to tie the game with a pinch-hit grand slam home run by Dane Myers in the sixth. It remained tied until the 10th inning when the Marlins took the lead in the top of the inning, only for the Dodgers to walk it off, 7–6, when Tommy Edman drove in Pages and Michael Conforto with a single. In the following game, Teoscar Hernández had four hits and four RBI, Ohtani and Pages homered and the Dodgers routed the Marlins, 15–2. Tony Gonsolin came off the injured list on April 30 and made his first start for the Dodgers since August of the 2023 season, allowing three runs in six innings with nine strikeouts. The Dodgers completed the sweep of the Marlins with a 12–7 win.

=== May ===
Yoshinobu Yamamoto allowed only one hit in six scoreless innings as the Dodgers began a three-game series against the Atlanta Braves with a 2–1 victory at Truist Park. The following day, Roki Sasaki picked up his first major league win as the Dodgers won 10–3. Shohei Ohtani and Freddie Freeman each had three hits, including a home run, in the game. Austin Riley had two home runs as the Braves took the series finale, 4–3. The Dodgers next series was against the Miami Marlins at loanDepot Park. Freeman and Ohtani each homered again the next day as they won the game 7–4. They homered again for the third straight day as Tony Gonsolin struck out eight in five innings, while allowing two runs. However, the Marlins came back to tie the game and won it, 5–4, on a bases-loaded walk-off hit by Jesús Sánchez in the 10th inning. In the following game, a three-run triple by Freeman led to the Dodgers scoring six runs in the seventh to blow open the game and win 10–1. Gabriel Moreno hit a grand-slam home run in the fourth as the Arizona Diamondbacks beat the Dodgers, 5–3, in the opener of a four-game series at Chase Field on May 8. The next game had several high scoring innings, with the Diamondbacks scoring three in the first, the Dodgers getting five in the third, the Diamondbacks responding with a four run fifth and then the Dodgers getting six runs in the ninth to win 14–11. A three-run home run by Ohtani was the deciding factor. The following day, the Dodgers were shut out by Corbin Burnes and lost 3–0. Freeman had four hits (including two doubles and a home run) and drove in four runs in the Dodgers 8–1 win in the series finale.

The Dodgers returned home on May 13 to play the Athletics. However, the Athletics hit five home runs (including two by Jacob Wilson) in an 11–1 rout of the Dodgers. In the following game, the Dodgers hit four home runs of their own in a 9–3 win. In the final game of the series, the Dodgers hit another five home runs, including two by Ohtani, and blew out the Athletics, 19–2. The next series was against the Los Angeles Angels, who beat the Dodgers, 6–2, in the opener. The Dodgers hit into a franchise record five double plays in the game. In the next game, Andy Pages and Kiké Hernández homered but the Angels Logan O'Hoppe drove in five RBIs, including a three run homer as part of a five run seventh as they won 11–9. The Angels proceeded to sweep the Dodgers with a 6–4 win in the series finale. Yusei Kikuchi struck out seven and only allowed one run on three hits in 5 2/3 innings. Mookie Betts hit two home runs in the first game of a three-game series against the Diamondbacks but the Dodgers lost 9–5, extending the losing streak to a season high four games. In the second game, Yamamoto only gave up one hit in seven innings and the Dodgers took a 1–0 lead into the top of the ninth only for the Diamondbacks to tie it on a solo homer by Gabriel Moreno. Corbin Carroll hit a two-run home run in the 10th to give Arizona the lead, but the Dodgers came back and won the game, 4–3, with a sacrifice fly from Max Muncy in the bottom of the inning. In the series finale, Dustin May struck out eight batters in six innings as the Dodgers won, 3–1, thanks to a 3-run homer from Teoscar Hernández.

On May 23, the Dodgers traveled to Citi Field to face the New York Mets in a 2024 National League Championship Series rematch. After a one-hour, thirty-eight-minute rain delay, the Dodgers took a 5–2 lead thanks to RBIs from Will Smith, Teoscar Hernández, Max Muncy, and Andy Pages. However, the Mets scored three runs off Tanner Scott in the bottom of the ninth to send the game to extra innings. Ultimately, the Dodgers won, 7–5, thanks to a Hernández RBI and a Pages sacrifice fly in the top of the 13th inning. In the following game, Brett Baty and Juan Soto had five hits and drove in four runs combined while David Peterson struck out seven in 7 2/3 innings and the Mets won, 5–2. The Mets took the series by taking the final game, 3–1. Kodai Senga struck out five in 5 1/3 innings, and Pete Alonso's two-run home run in the first inning gave the Mets the lead they never relinquished. The Dodgers next began a three-game series with the Cleveland Guardians at Progressive Field with a Memorial Day game. Yamamoto struck out seven in six innings, while allowing only two runs on three hits. Ohtani and Smith homered as the Dodgers won, 7–2. The Dodgers hit three home runs as part of their 9–5 win in the next game. The Dodgers took a 4–2 lead into the eighth inning in the series finale, only for the Guardians to score five runs in the inning, which included a three-run home run by Angel Martínez, for a 7–4 win.

On May 30, the New York Yankees visited Dodger Stadium for a 2024 World Series rematch. Ohtani hit two home runs and Pages recorded three RBIs as the Dodgers recovered from a three-run deficit with four runs in the sixth inning for an 8–5 victory. The following day, Landon Knack allowed only one run in six innings while the Dodgers jumped on the Yankees early and won 18–2. Muncy hit two three-run home runs, Tommy Edman and Hyeseong Kim each had four hits, while Kim, Pages, and Dalton Rushing also homered. It was the most runs ever scored by a National League team against the Yankees in a game, regular season, or postseason.

=== June ===
In the series finale, Yoshinobu Yamamoto struggled, giving up seven hits and allowing four runs, including one on a wild pitch. The Dodgers hit three home runs, but it was not enough and they lost, 7–3. On June 2, the New York Mets came to Dodger Stadium for a four-game series. Dustin May struck out five batters in six innings, and a home run and a sacrifice fly from Shohei Ohtani sent the game into extra innings. However, Tanner Scott allowed two additional runs and the Dodgers lost, 4–3. In the second game, Max Muncy homered twice while committing two errors, which led to two runs scoring. Ultimately, the Dodgers won the game, 6–5, on a walk-off double by Freddie Freeman in the bottom of the tenth. In the third game of the series, Tony Gonsolin threw six strikeouts in five innings, but Kiké Hernández committed an error, leading to three runs scoring in the first inning. The Dodgers got only three hits off Mets starter Griffin Canning and lost, 6–1, after allowing a three-run home run to Pete Alonso in the eighth inning, his second of the day. In the final game of the series and the homestand, the Mets jumped out to a 4–0 lead in the third thanks to three home runs. The Dodgers got three back in the bottom of the inning, and then scored three more in the eighth to win the game, 6–5, and split the series.

The next series was against the St. Louis Cardinals at Busch Stadium. Pedro Pagés homered in the second inning to give the Cardinals a 2–0 lead. Sonny Gray allowed eight hits to the Dodgers in his 6 1/3 innings but he and three relievers kept the Dodgers scoreless and the Cardinals won 5–0. The next day, Yamamoto struck out nine in six shutout innings while only giving up four hits. However, the Dodgers lost, 2–1, on a walk-off RBI single from Nolan Arenado. The Dodgers avoided being swept by winning the series finale, 7–3. Clayton Kershaw struck out seven in five innings, while allowing only one run, to pick up his first win of the season. The Dodgers traveled to Petco Park on June 9 to face the San Diego Padres. The game was tied at six runs after nine innings, and the Dodgers won, 8–7, thanks to RBIs from Andy Pages and Tommy Edman in the tenth. In the next game, Matt Sauer gave up 13 hits and allowed nine runs in a 11–1 defeat. The Dodgers only managed to get three hits off Padres starter Dylan Cease. The Dodgers wrapped up the series with a 5–2 win. Ben Casparius allowed one run in four innings while making a spot start, and the Dodgers took the lead with a three-run home run by Teoscar Hernández in the fifth inning.

On June 13, the San Francisco Giants came to Dodger Stadium for a three-game series. Yamamoto gave up six hits and allowed five runs, including a grand slam to Casey Schmitt, in 4 2/3 innings and the Dodgers lost, 6–2. The next day, Kershaw struck out five and only allowed three hits in seven scoreless innings, Ohtani homered twice and Teoscar Hernández and Miguel Rojas also hit home runs in a 11–5 win. The Dodgers won the series finale, 5–4. Ohtani had three hits and Pages drove in four of the runs, three of them on a home run in the bottom of the fifth. The Padres came to town next. Ohtani made his first pitching appearance for the Dodgers, and first since the 2023 season, pitching one inning. He also had two hits and two RBIs as a batter. The Dodgers scored five runs in the fourth inning, leading to a 6–3 victory. The Dodgers won the second game, 8–6. Pages had four hits and three RBIs, including two solo home runs, and Will Smith also homered. In the third game, Emmet Sheehan struck out six while allowing three hits and one run in his first start since 2023. A Pages' sacrifice fly and a Dalton Rushing RBI double in the fifth gave the Dodgers a 3–1 lead. The Padres tied the game at three in the top of the ninth as a result of a throwing error from Muncy and a RBI double by Xander Bogaerts. Smith hit a pinch-hit walk-off home run in the bottom of the ninth for a 4–3 Dodgers victory. It was the third pinch-hit walk-off of his career, breaking a tie with Rick Monday for the most in franchise history. In the series finale, Yamamoto gave up seven hits and allowed three runs, including a home run to Bogaerts, in a 5–3 defeat. The Dodgers scored runs off an error and a wild pitch in the bottom of the ninth. Eight batters were hit in the four-game series. Manager Dave Roberts was suspended for the opening game of a three-game series against the Washington Nationals as a result of his actions in the previous game against the Padres. Rojas hit a double and a two-run home run, Ohtani, Betts and Pages each drove in runs and the Dodgers held on for a 6–5 win. The next day, Pages, Smith, and Teoscar Hernández all homered. However, the Dodgers allowed five home runs, including two to Nathaniel Lowe, in a 7–2 loss. In the series finale, the Nationals jumped out to a lead thanks to a three-run home run by Lowe in the third inning only for the Dodgers to score four runs in the sixth and seven runs in the seventh en route to a 13–7 win. Muncy had two home runs, including a grand slam, and drove in seven runs while Ohtani had a homer and triple and drove in five runs.

On June 24, the Dodgers traveled to Coors Field to face the Colorado Rockies. Justin Wrobleski struck out seven while only allowing two runs. Ohtani and Michael Conforto homered, and Teoscar Hernández drove in two runs in a 9–7 win. In the next game, Yamamoto struck out six and only allowed one hit in five scoreless innings. Muncy drove in six runs, including a grand slam, following a lengthy rain delay, and the Dodgers won, 8–1. The Dodgers finished off the series with a 3–1 win. Kershaw struck out five in six innings, and Ohtani homered in the game. Ohtani and Muncy both homered again in the following game, the opener of a three-game series against the Kansas City Royals at Kauffman Stadium. The Dodgers won, 5–4. The next day, Casparius struggled, giving up eight hits and allowing six runs, including a three-run home run to Vinnie Pasquantino in four innings as the Royals won the game 9–5. The Dodgers won the last game of the series, 5–1. Wrobleski struck out six in six innings as Kiké Hernández and Smith hit home runs.

=== July ===
Yoshinobu Yamamoto struck out eight batters in seven innings and only allowed one run in the first game of a three-game series against the Chicago White Sox at Dodger Stadium. Andy Pages and Michael Conforto each scored two runs and Shohei Ohtani homered in a 6–1 Dodgers victory. On July 2, Clayton Kershaw struck out three batters in six innings to reach 3,000 career strikeouts. He became the 20th pitcher and fourth left handed pitcher in MLB history to reach that mark as well as the third to do so while spending his entire career with one team. The Dodgers trailed by two going into the ninth and won the game by scoring three runs in the inning, with Freddie Freeman walking it off with an RBI single to win 5–4. The Dodgers completed the series sweep with a 6–2 win. Freeman drove in three runs and Mookie Betts and Conforto each hit a home run. Dustin May pitched five perfect innings and finished with four hits and two runs allowed in seven innings while striking out nine. The next series was against the Houston Astros. Ben Casparius had a poor performance, giving up nine hits and allowing six runs in three innings on the Fourth of July. Noah Davis allowed an additional 10 runs in 1 1/3 innings as the Dodgers were blown out, 18–1. It was the biggest blowout loss in the history of Dodger Stadium and the Dodgers overall worst loss since the 2001 season. The 10 runs given up in the sixth inning was the highest number in one inning since the St. Louis Cardinals scored 11 in the third inning against them on April 23, 1999. The Astros won again in the next game, 6–4. Zack Short drove in three runs in the third with a double off Justin Wrobleski, who gave up seven hits and allowed four runs in 4 2/3 innings. In the series finale, Emmet Sheehan allowed only one run in five innings but the Astros finished off a series sweep with a 5–1 win. It was the first time the Dodgers had been swept by the Astros in Los Angeles since 2008.

The Dodgers went back on the road on July 7 to play the Milwaukee Brewers at American Family Field. Yamamoto had the worst start of his career, allowing five runs on four hits and two walks while recording only two outs. A three-run home run by Andrew Vaughn was the key and the Brewers won a blow out, 9–1, extending the Dodgers' losing streak to four games. Ohtani led off the next game with a home run, but the Dodgers could only get four hits against Brewers starter Jacob Misiorowski, who struck out 12 in six innings, as the Brewers won 3–1. Tyler Glasnow returned from a long stint on the injured list to start the series finale, allowing only one unearned run in five innings. The Dodgers took a 2–1 lead into the ninth only for the Brewers to tie the game and then win it, 3–2, in extra innings on a walk-off hit by Jackson Chourio to extend the Dodgers losing streak to six games, for the first time since April of 2019. The next road series was against the San Francisco Giants at Oracle Park. May gave up five hits and allowed seven runs in 4 2/3 innings, and a Teoscar Hernández RBI double and Conforto home run reduced the deficit to one run. However, Will Smith ground into double play in the ninth inning and the Dodgers lost, 8–7. The Dodgers snapped the losing streak on July 12 with a 2–1 victory over the Giants. Ohtani pitched three shutout innings and Sheehan allowed only the one run in 4 1/3 innings while Conforto had three hits and scored both runs. The Dodgers finished off the series and headed into the all-star break with a 5–2 win in 11 innings. Yamamoto struck out seven in seven scoreless innings but the Giants tied the game with a two-run home run by Luis Matos in the ninth. However, Freeman, Teoscar Hernández and Pages each drove in runs in the 11th.

The Dodgers had five players selected to the 2025 Major League Baseball All-Star Game. Ohtani started at designated hitter, Smith at catcher and Freeman at first base. Yamamoto was selected as a reserve and Kershaw was added as a legends pick.

The season resumed on July 18 at home against the Brewers. Glasnow struck out six in six innings and allowed only one run, on an RBI double by Caleb Durbin in the fifth. Durbin also homered in the seventh off reliver Kirby Yates and the Brewers won the game 2–0 as the Dodgers managed only three hits off Quinn Priester and three relievers. The Dodgers then lost their fifth straight game to the Brewers the following day, 8–7, despite hitting three home runs. In the finale, the Dodgers took a 3–0 lead after a two-run homer by Ohtani in the third but the Brewers scored three runs in the fourth and again in the sixth and swept the season series with a 6–5 win. The Dodgers committed three errors in the game. The Minnesota Twins came to town for the next series. Will Smith hit two home runs, and Ohtani and Pages also went deep as the Dodgers won 5–2. James Outman robbed a potential game-tying home run from Carlos Correa to end the game. Ohtani became the first pitcher to allow a home run and hit a home run in the first inning of a game since Randy Lerch of the 1979 Philadelphia Phillies. In the following game, the Twins took an early three run lead, the Dodgers tied the game on a three-run home run by Pages in the fourth only for the Twins to score three runs in each of the sixth and seventh innings en route to a 10–7 win. In the series finale, Glasnow allowed only one run (a solo home run by Royce Lewis) in seven innings, while striking out 12. Ohtani hit a home run in the first inning, the fifth consecutive game he had homered in, tying the franchise record. The Dodgers won, 4–3, on a two-run walk-off hit by Freeman in the bottom of the ninth.

On July 25, the Dodgers went on the road to Fenway Park to play a three-game series with the Boston Red Sox. They won the opener, 5–2. Teoscar Hernández hit a two-run home run in the eighth inning. In the second game, Red Sox starter Garrett Crochet struck out 10 and only allowed two runs in six innings and the Dodgers lost 4–2. In the series finale, Conforto had three hits with two doubles and a home run but the Dodgers stranded 13 runners on base in a 4–3 loss. A two-run homer by Alex Bregman in the fifth counted for the deciding runs. Next up for the Dodgers was a three-game series at Great American Ball Park against the Cincinnati Reds. Yamamoto struck out nine while allowing one run on four hits in seven innings and Betts had two hits and scored three runs in a 5–2 win. The Dodgers took the next game as well, 5–4. Tommy Edman started the scoring with a two-run homer in the second and then Will Smith drove in the winning run with an RBI double in the ninth. The Reds took the series finale, 5–2, scoring three runs in the bottom of the eighth to pull ahead.

=== August ===
On August 1, the Dodgers began a three-game series at George M. Steinbrenner Field against the Tampa Bay Rays. In the opener, Clayton Kershaw pitched six shutout innings while Freddie Freeman had a double, a home run, and drove in three runs in the 5–0 victory. The next day, Blake Snell, in his first start since going on the injured list in April, had eight strikeouts in five innings but allowed three runs (two home runs to Yandy Díaz) and the Dodgers lost 4–0. The Dodgers finished the series with another shutout win, 3–0. Freeman and Andy Pages each drove in a run and Mookie Betts hit a sacrifice fly while Yoshinobu Yamamoto struck out six in 5 2/3 scoreless innings.

The St. Louis Cardinals visited Dodger Stadium for a three-game series starting on August 4. The opener was tied 2–2 at the top of the ninth, and Brock Stewart allowed the game-winning run, an RBI hit to Yohel Pozo, leading to a 3–2 defeat. In the following game, Max Muncy had four hits, including two home runs and Teoscar Hernández had three hits, also including two home runs, and the Dodgers won 12–6. It was Muncy's 19th career multi-homer game for the Dodgers, tying Mike Piazza for the most since the team moved to Los Angeles. In the final game of the series, Shohei Ohtani struck out eight batters in four innings as the starting pitcher and also hit a two run home run. However, the Cardinals won 5–3 after Alex Freeland allowed two runs at the top of the eighth on a throwing error. The next series was against the Toronto Blue Jays. In the opener, Kershaw allowed one run on seven hits and Betts hit a two-run home run in the bottom of the fifth, leading to a 5–2 victory. The Dodgers took the second game, 9–1. Snell had another excellent performance, striking out 10 in five, and Ohtani reached 40 home runs for the third consecutive season and fourth overall. He was also only the fourth Dodgers player in history with multiple such seasons (Duke Snider, Gil Hodges and Shawn Green). The Dodgers took a 3–1 lead in the series finale thanks to home runs by Ohtani and Freeman. Back-to-back home runs by Vladimir Guerrero Jr. and Addison Barger in the eighth and a solo homer by Ernie Clement in the top of the ninth had the Blue Jays up. The Dodgers managed to load the bases in the bottom of the inning with Ohtani and Betts due up but were unable to score and the Blue Jays won 5–4. It was the first game since the 1982 season that the Dodgers had at least 10 hits and 10 walks and lost. They were 1 for 10 with runners in scoring position and left 16 runners on base.

Next up was a brief three-game road trip against the Los Angeles Angels at Angel Stadium. Yamamoto struggled in the first game, allowing six runs in only 4 2/3 innings. The Dodgers made it close by scoring four runs in the eighth on a solo homer by Ohtani and a three-run homer by Muncy, but lost 7–4. In the following game, Dalton Rushing and Ohtani hit home runs, but the bullpen faltered and the Angels won, 7–6, on a walk-off RBI hit from Jo Adell in the 10th inning. The Angels finished the season sweep with a 6–5 win. The Dodgers tied the game on a four-ball walk to Will Smith but Justin Wrobleski blew the save after allowing a two-run hit to Logan O'Hoppe. With the loss, the Dodgers fell out of first place in the division for the first time since April 27.

On July 15, the division leading San Diego Padres came to Los Angeles for a three-game series. Kershaw allowed only one run on two hits and one walk in six innings, Teoscar Hernández homered and the Dodgers picked up a 3–2 victory to even the division race. The next day, Snell pitched six shutout innings, Hernández hit another home run and sacrifice fly while a Jackson Merrill fielding error allowed two more runs to score as the Dodgers won, 6–0, and retook the lead in the NL West. The Dodgers scored four runs in the first inning of the series finale with home runs by Freeman and Pages. The Padres came back to tie the game but Betts hit a go-ahead home run in the eighth as the Dodgers swept the series with a 5–4 win.

The Dodgers next left for a seven-game road trip, beginning with a four-game series against the Colorado Rockies at Coors Field. Two fielding mistakes by Teoscar Hernández in right field led to two Rockies runs and they walked off the Dodgers, 4–3 to open the series. In the following game, Alex Call had four hits (including a home run), scored three runs and drove in two as the Dodgers won 11–4. Hernández homered again, but Ohtani struggled in his next start, giving up nine hits and allowing five runs in four innings, and the Dodgers were defeated, 8–3. The Dodgers wound up splitting the series with a 9–5 victory in the finale. Freeman and Pages homered and Alex Freeland had three hits, including a double and triple, in the game. The battle between the top two teams in the division resumed when the Dodgers visited Petco Park on August 22 to resume their rivalry with the Padres. Snell began the series by allowing two runs in seven innings, however the Dodgers could only manage one hit against Yu Darvish in six innings and three overall as they lost 2–1 and fell back into a tie for the division lead. The Padres took over the division lead with a 5–1 win the next day. The Dodgers managed only two hits against Nestor Cortes and three relievers, with a solo home run by Freeland one of them. In the final game between the two teams in the regular season, the Dodgers won 8–2 to even the division race. They hit four home runs, including two by Freeman and a three-run homer by Rushing.

On July 25, the Dodgers hosted the Cincinnati Reds for a three-game series. Pages hit two home runs with three RBI, two more runs scored on a Reds error and Betts also homered as the Dodgers won the opener, 7–0. Emmet Sheehan struck out 10 in seven innings while only allowing two hits and one walk. In the second game, Kershaw allowed only two hits and one run with six strikeouts in five innings while Ohtani and Miguel Rojas drove in runs, Smith homered and the Dodgers won 6–3. Kiké Hernández and Rushing each had two RBIs while Rushing homered and the Dodgers swept the series with a 5–1 win. Ohtani earned his first win as a Dodger, throwing nine strikeouts and allowing one run (a solo home run to Noelvi Marte) in five innings. The Dodgers pitching staff struck out 19 batters in the game, a franchise record. The Arizona Diamondbacks came to town next. Snell struck out eight in 5 1/3 innings, but the offense struggled, only managing to get three hits against Diamondbacks starter Zac Gallen and three relivers in a 3–0 loss. The Dodgers lost the second game, 6–1. A fielding error from Pages lead to one run scoring and Kirby Yates allowed a three-run home run to Ildemaro Vargas at the top of the ninth. In the next game, Yamamoto struck out 10 batters while allowing only four hits and one run in seven innings. Corbin Carroll hit a three-run home run in the eighth inning for the Diamondbacks to tie the game, but the Dodgers won 5–4 on a walk-off home run by Smith.

=== September ===
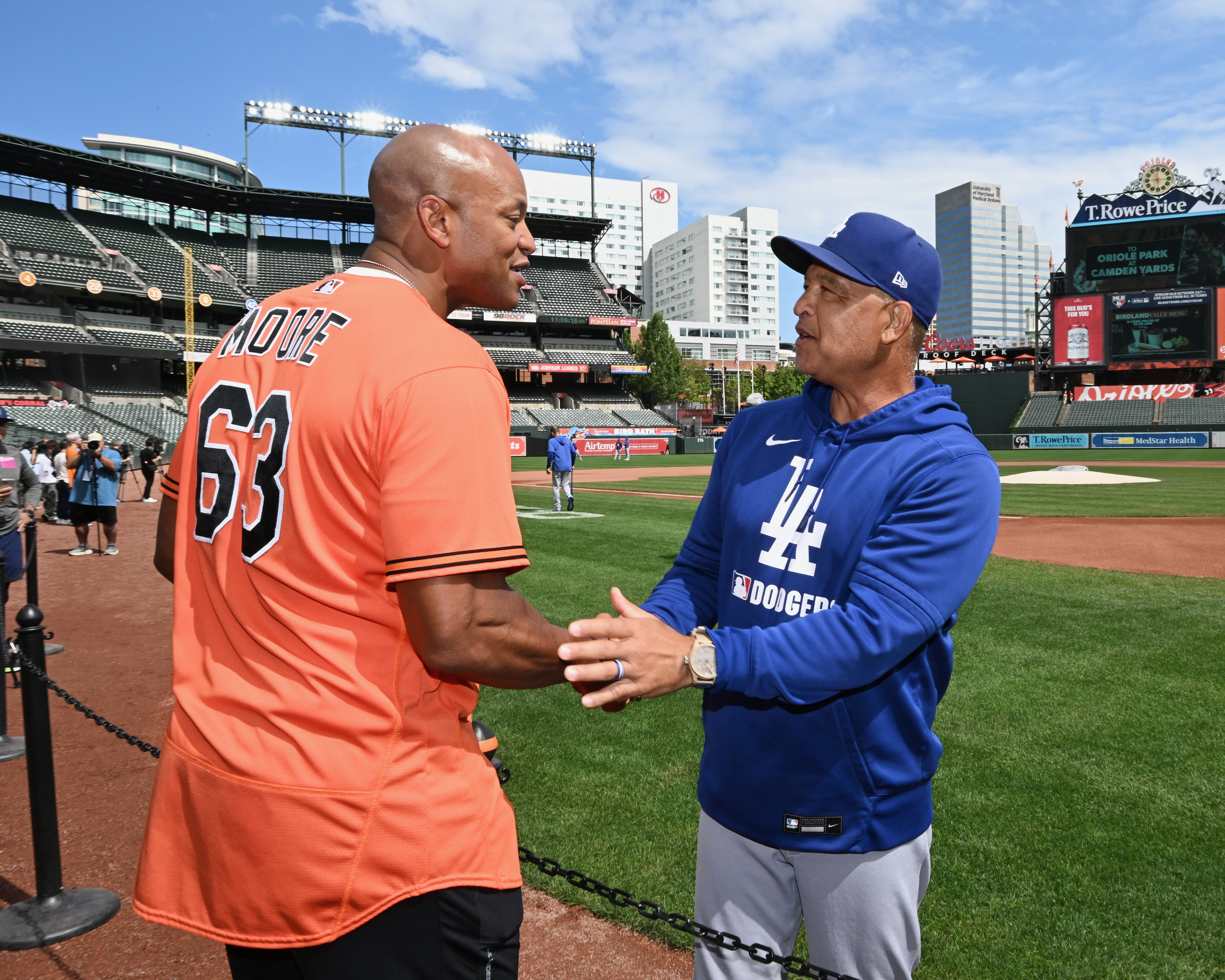
Dave Roberts meeting with Maryland governor Wes Moore before a road game against the Baltimore Orioles.

The Dodgers went back on the road on September 2 to play the Pittsburgh Pirates at PNC Park. Shohei Ohtani had three hits, including his 100th home run as a Dodger and two doubles, but the Pirates won the game 9–7. The Pirates shut out the Dodgers 3–0 the following day. The Pirates finished off a series sweep with a 5–3 victory in the finale. Paul Skenes allowed only two hits and one walk with eight strikeouts in six shutout innings. Next they traveled to Oriole Park at Camden Yards to play the Baltimore Orioles. Freddie Freeman hit a solo home run but Samuel Basallo's walk-off home run gave the Orioles a 2–1 win and sent the Dodgers to the fourth straight loss. The following day, Yoshinobu Yamamoto struck out 10 batters and took a no-hitter through 8 2/3 innings before Jackson Holliday's home run ended his day with an MLB career high 112 pitches. Blake Treinen came in out of the bullpen, loaded the bases and walked in a run before Emmanuel Rivera drove in two on a single off Tanner Scott and the Orioles won 4–3 to extend the Dodgers losing streak. The road trip and the losing streak came to an end the next day, with a 5–2 Dodgers win. Clayton Kershaw allowed two runs in 5 2/3 innings while striking out eight. Ohtani hit two home runs and Mookie Betts added one as well.

On September 8, the Colorado Rockies came to Dodger Stadium for a three-game series. Tyler Glasnow struck out 11 batters in seven innings without allowing a hit and the Dodgers lost a chance at a combined no-hitter in the ninth when Scott allowed a leadoff single to Ryan Ritter. Betts and Freeman drove in the Dodgers' only runs in a 3–1 win. The next day, the Dodgers hit four home runs, two of which came from Teoscar Hernández, for a 7–2 victory. Emmet Sheehan had nine strikeouts and gave up only three hits in seven innings. The Dodgers finished off a sweep of the Rockies with a 9–0 shutout win. Blake Snell allowed only two hits and two walks while striking out 11 in six innings while Betts had four hits and five RBI in the game, including a grand slam in the eighth inning.

The Dodgers traveled to Oracle Park to face the San Francisco Giants starting on September 12. In the series opener, Yamamoto struck out 10 in seven innings while allowing only one hit and Michael Conforto hit a solo home run in the seventh, but Scott blew another game, allowing a grand slam to Patrick Bailey in the bottom of the tenth, resulting in a 5–1 loss. The next day, Teoscar Hernández had two doubles and drove in three runs, Ohtani had three hits, including a home run, and the Dodgers won 13–7. The Dodgers took the series finale with a 10–2 rout of the Giants. Tyler Glasnow allowed three hits and one run in 6 2/3 innings. Teoscar Hernández had four hits and Betts and Freeman each had three. Ohtani set a new Dodgers record with his 135th run scored of the season.

The Dodgers returned home on September 15 to play the Philadelphia Phillies. Sheehan followed opener Anthony Banda (who allowed a solo home run to Kyle Schwarber) and pitched 5 2/3 and did not allow a hit until a Otto Kemp double in the seventh. Jack Dreyer replaced him and allowed a three-run homer to Weston Wilson which gave the Phillies their first lead after the Dodgers had led 4–1. After alternating home runs by Betts, Bryce Harper, and Andy Pages, the score was tied at five after regulation. However, Treinen allowed a double steal, followed by a sacrifice fly to J. T. Realmuto in the tenth, and the Dodgers lost 6–5. In the second game, Kiké Hernández had three RBI and Ohtani homered and pitched five scoreless, no-hit innings, becoming the first player in Dodgers history to record 50 home runs and 50 strikeouts in a single season. The Phillies scored six runs in the sixth inning, three of them on a Brandon Marsh homer. Treinen struggled again, allowing a three-run home run to Rafael Marchán in the ninth for a 9–6 defeat. The Dodgers won the series finale, 5–0. Freeman and Ohtani homered and Snell struck out 12 and only gave up two hits in seven innings. The final home series of the season was four-games against the Giants, starting on September 18. The Dodgers, as a team, struck out 14 batters, while walking 10, and only allowed one hit, in a 2–1 win to start it off. The next day, Kershaw, who announced that he would retire at the end of the season, made the final regular season home start of his career, striking out six in 4 1/3 innings. Miguel Rojas homered in the fourth and Ohtani and Betts hit back-to-back home runs in the fifth as the Dodgers won, 6–3, clinching their 13th straight postseason appearance (tying the 1995–2007 New York Yankees for second most all time). The Dodgers hit four home runs in the third game of the series, a 7–5 win. However, the Dodgers were unable to sweep the series, losing the finale 3–1. Sheehan pitched seven scoreless innings, striking out 10 while giving up only one hit. The Giants scored three runs in the eighth off Treinen and that was all they needed.

On September 23, the Dodgers began a six-game road trip to close out the season. The first series was against the Arizona Diamondbacks at Chase Field. Ohtani struck out eight batters in six shutout innings, while Teoscar Hernández and Ben Rortvedt each homered, but the bullpen's struggles continued. The Diamondbacks scored three runs in the seventh inning and then Scott allowed two in the ninth, including a sacrifice fly to Geraldo Perdomo to walk off the Dodgers, 5–4. It was Scott's 10th blown save of the season. In the second game of the series, Snell allowed one run in six innings, Pages homered in the fourth, and the Dodgers jumped out to another early lead. The bullpen again blew the lead, allowing the Diamondbacks to score three runs in the eighth to tie it. The Dodgers managed to win this game, 5–4, thanks to an RBI hit by Tommy Edman in the 11th inning. In the finale, Yamamoto struck out seven in six scoreless innings, the Dodgers hit four home runs (including two by Freeman) and they won 8–0. With the win, the Dodgers clinched their 4th consecutive National League West title and the 12th in 13 seasons. Next, the Dodgers traveled to T-Mobile Park to play the Seattle Mariners in the final series of the season.The Dodgers won the first game of the series, 3–2. Kiké Hernández hit a two-run home run in the game. In the next game, he had another three hits and two RBI while Rushing also homered in a 5–3 win. In the final game of the regular season, Kershaw pitched 5 1/3 scoreless innings with seven strikeouts in his final MLB start, Ohtani broke his own franchise record with his 55th homerun and the Dodgers finished off a sweep of the Mariners with a 6–1 win.

== Postseason ==
=== Game log ===
2025 Postseason Game Log: 13–4 (Home: 5–3; Away: 8–1)
National League Wild Card Series: 2–0 (Home: 2–0; Away: 0–0)

#	Date	Opponent	Score	Win	Loss	Save	Attendance	Record
1	September 30	Reds	W 10–5	Snell (1–0)	Greene (0–1)	—	50,555	1–0
2	October 1	Reds	W 8–4	Yamamoto (1–0)	Littell (0–1)	—	50,465	2–0

National League Division Series: 3–1 (Home: 1–1; Away: 2–0)

#	Date	Opponent	Score	Win	Loss	Save	Attendance	Record
1	October 4	@ Phillies	W 5–3	Ohtani (1–0)	Robertson (0–1)	Sasaki (1)	45,777	1–0
2	October 6	@ Phillies	W 4–3	Snell (2–0)	Luzardo (0–1)	Sasaki (2)	45,653	2–0
3	October 8	Phillies	L 2–8	Suárez (1–0)	Yamamoto (1–1)	—	53,689	2–1
4	October 9	Phillies	W 2–1 (11)	Vesia (1–0)	Luzardo (0–2)	—	50,563	3–1

National League Championship Series: 4–0 (Home: 2–0; Away: 2–0)

#	Date	Opponent	Score	Win	Loss	Save	Attendance	Record
1	October 13	@ Brewers	W 2–1	Snell (3–0)	Patrick (0–1)	Treinen (1)	41,737	1–0
2	October 14	@ Brewers	W 5–1	Yamamoto (2–1)	Peralta (1–2)	—	41,427	2–0
3	October 16	Brewers	W 3–1	Vesia (2–0)	Misiorowski (2–1)	Sasaki (3)	51,251	3–0
4	October 17	Brewers	W 5–1	Ohtani (2–0)	Quintana (0–1)	—	52,883	4–0

World Series: 4–3 (Home: 1–2; Away: 3–1)

#	Date	Opponent	Score	Win	Loss	Save	Attendance	Record
1	October 24	@ Blue Jays	L 4–11	Domínguez (2–0)	Snell (3–1)	—	44,353	0–1
2	October 25	@ Blue Jays	W 5–1	Yamamoto (3–1)	Gausman (2–2)	—	44,607	1–1
3	October 27	Blue Jays	W 6–5 (18)	Klein (1–0)	Little (0–2)	—	52,654	2–1
4	October 28	Blue Jays	L 2–6	Bieber (2–0)	Ohtani (2–1)	—	52,552	2–2
5	October 29	Blue Jays	L 1–6	Yesavage (3–1)	Snell (3–2)	—	52,175	2–3
6	October 31	@ Blue Jays	W 3–1	Yamamoto (4–1)	Gausman (2–3)	Glasnow (1)	44,710	3–3
7	November 1	@ Blue Jays	W 5–4 (11)	Yamamoto (5–1)	Bieber (2–1)	—	44,713	4–3

=== Postseason rosters ===
Playoff rosters
National League Wild Card Series

- Pitchers: 7 Blake Snell 11 Roki Sasaki 18 Yoshinobu Yamamoto 31 Tyler Glasnow 49 Blake Treinen 51 Alex Vesia 60 Edgardo Henriquez 66 Tanner Scott 70 Justin Wrobleski 80 Emmet Sheehan 86 Jack Dreyer
- Two-way players: 17 Shohei Ohtani
- Catchers: 16 Will Smith 47 Ben Rortvedt 68 Dalton Rushing
- Infielders: 5 Freddie Freeman 13 Max Muncy 50 Mookie Betts 72 Miguel Rojas
- Outfielders: 12 Alex Call 37 Teoscar Hernández 44 Andy Pages 75 Justin Dean
- Infielders/Outfielders: 6 Hyeseong Kim 8 Kiké Hernández 25 Tommy Edman

National League Division Series

- Pitchers: 7 Blake Snell 11 Roki Sasaki 18 Yoshinobu Yamamoto 22 Clayton Kershaw 31 Tyler Glasnow 43 Anthony Banda 49 Blake Treinen 51 Alex Vesia 66 Tanner Scott (games 1-3) 70 Justin Wrobleski (game 4) 80 Emmet Sheehan 86 Jack Dreyer
- Two-way players: 17 Shohei Ohtani
- Catchers: 16 Will Smith 47 Ben Rortvedt 68 Dalton Rushing
- Infielders: 5 Freddie Freeman 13 Max Muncy 50 Mookie Betts 72 Miguel Rojas
- Outfielders: 12 Alex Call 37 Teoscar Hernández 44 Andy Pages 75 Justin Dean
- Infielders/Outfielders: 6 Hyeseong Kim 8 Kiké Hernández 25 Tommy Edman

National League Championship Series

- Pitchers: 7 Blake Snell 11 Roki Sasaki 18 Yoshinobu Yamamoto 22 Clayton Kershaw 31 Tyler Glasnow 43 Anthony Banda 49 Blake Treinen 51 Alex Vesia 70 Justin Wrobleski 78 Ben Casparius 80 Emmet Sheehan 86 Jack Dreyer
- Two-way players: 17 Shohei Ohtani
- Catchers: 16 Will Smith 47 Ben Rortvedt
- Infielders: 5 Freddie Freeman 13 Max Muncy 50 Mookie Betts 72 Miguel Rojas
- Outfielders: 12 Alex Call 37 Teoscar Hernández 44 Andy Pages 75 Justin Dean
- Infielders/Outfielders: 6 Hyeseong Kim 8 Kiké Hernández 25 Tommy Edman

World Series

- Pitchers: 7 Blake Snell 11 Roki Sasaki 18 Yoshinobu Yamamoto 22 Clayton Kershaw 31 Tyler Glasnow 43 Anthony Banda 49 Blake Treinen 60 Edgardo Henriquez 61 Will Klein 70 Justin Wrobleski 80 Emmet Sheehan 86 Jack Dreyer
- Two-way players: 17 Shohei Ohtani
- Catchers: 16 Will Smith 47 Ben Rortvedt
- Infielders: 5 Freddie Freeman 13 Max Muncy 50 Mookie Betts 72 Miguel Rojas
- Outfielders: 12 Alex Call 37 Teoscar Hernández 44 Andy Pages 75 Justin Dean
- Infielders/Outfielders: 6 Hyeseong Kim 8 Kiké Hernández 25 Tommy Edman

=== Wild Card Series ===
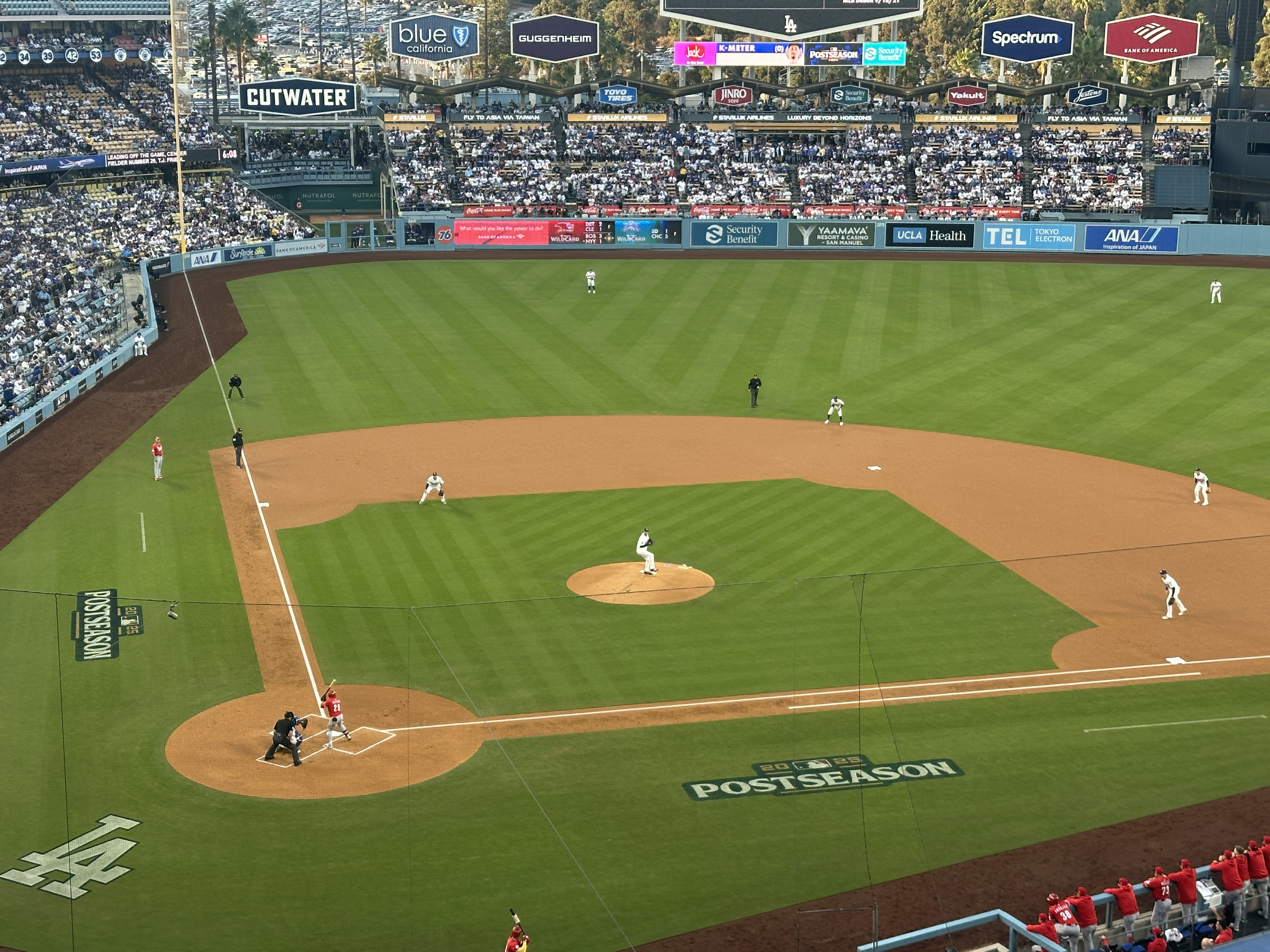
Blake Snell pitches for the Dodgers in the opening game of the Wild Card Series

After finishing with the National League West title and the third seed in the playoffs, the Dodgers played the Cincinnati Reds in the Wild Card Series at Dodger Stadium. Blake Snell started the first game of the series for the Dodgers. He struck out nine batters in seven innings, while allowing four hits, two walks, and two runs (both in the seventh). Shohei Ohtani and Teoscar Hernández both homered twice in the game and Tommy Edman also homered in the 10–5 win. The five home runs by the Dodgers in the game matched a franchise post-season record set previously in Game 5 of the 2021 NLCS and Game 3 of the 2020 NLCS. The 2021 game was also the only other time the Dodgers had two teammates each hit two home runs in a post-season game (Chris Taylor and A. J. Pollock). In the second game of the series, Yoshinobu Yamamoto struck out nine in 6 1/3 innings while allowing only two unearned runs. Mookie Betts had four hits, including three doubles, as the Dodgers won 8–4 to sweep the series.

=== Division Series ===
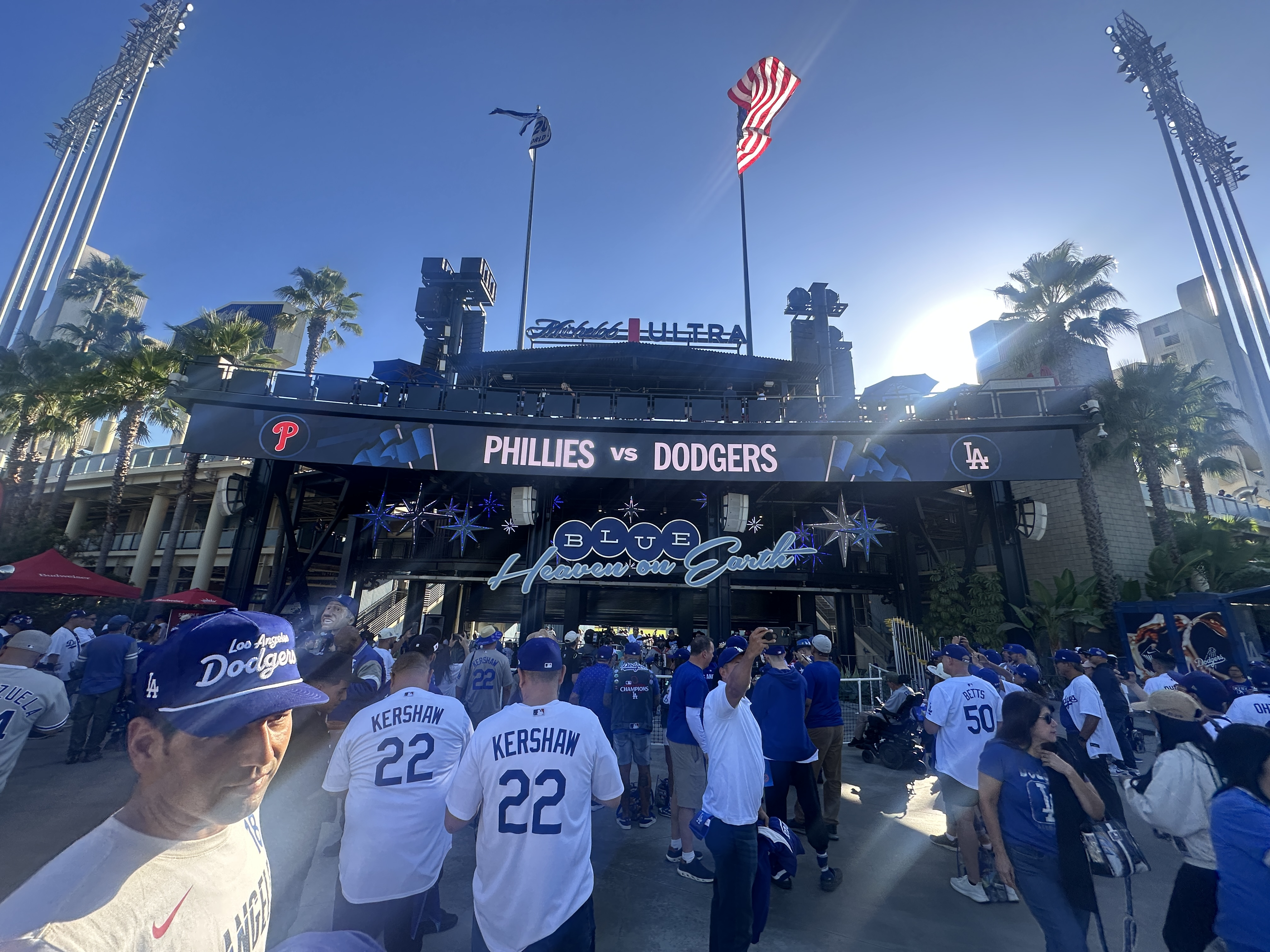
Dodger Stadium before Game 3 of the 2025 NLDS

The Dodgers faced the Philadelphia Phillies in the division series starting at Citizens Bank Park. In the opening game, the Phillies took an early 3–0 lead on a two-run triple by J.T. Realmuto and a sacrifice fly in the second. Shohei Ohtani pitched six innings, allowing only three runs while striking out nine. A two-run double by Kiké Hernández in the sixth and a three-run Teoscar Hernández home run the following inning gave the Dodgers a 5–3 lead, and they held on to win by that score with Roki Sasaki picking up his first professional save. The second game was a scoreless pitching duel through six innings as Blake Snell gave up only one hit and struck out nine while Jesús Luzardo matched him with a scoreless six. However, the Dodgers got to him in the seventh, scoring four runs, two on an RBI single by Will Smith. The Phillies came back, with one run in the eighth and then two in the ninth off Blake Treinen before Sasaki came in to retire the final batter with the tying run on third for a 4–3 win.

The series moved to Dodger Stadium for Game 3 but Yoshinobu Yamamoto struggled for the Dodgers, pitching only four innings and allowing three runs, including a home run by Kyle Schwarber. Schwarber hit a second home run, in the eighth off Clayton Kershaw as the Phillies scored five runs that inning to break open the game. The Dodgers meanwhile were only able to get one run (a solo home run by Tommy Edman) off starter Aaron Nola and Ranger Suárez, who worked five innings of relief to collect the win. The Phillies won 8–2 to prevent the series sweep. The following game was a pitchers duel between Tyler Glasnow (eight strikeouts in six scoreless innings) and Cristopher Sánchez (five strikeouts in 6 1/3). Both teams scored a run in the seventh and then the game stayed 1–1 into extra innings. The Dodgers won the game when pinch runner Hyeseong Kim scored on a throwing error by Phillies reliever Orion Kerkering in the 11th inning. The 2–1 win clinched the series for the Dodgers.

=== National League Championship Series ===
The Dodgers advanced to their second straight National League Championship Series, facing the Milwaukee Brewers, starting at American Family Field. In the opener, Blake Snell allowed only one hit while striking out 10 batters in eight innings. The Dodgers scored on a solo home run by Freddie Freeman in the sixth and a bases-loaded walk by Mookie Betts in the ninth. The Brewers got a run in the bottom of the ninth and then Blake Treinen struck out Brice Turang with the bases loaded for the Dodgers' 2–1 win. Jackson Chourio led off the second game with a solo home run on the first pitch thrown by Yoshinobu Yamamoto, but Yamamoto settled down after that. He only allowed the one run on three hits and one walk while striking out seven in a complete game victory. Teoscar Hernández and Max Muncy homered for the Dodgers, who won 5–1 to win the second game of the series. Muncy's home run was the 14th postseason homer of his career, a new Dodgers franchise record and Yamamoto threw the first complete game in the postseason for the Dodgers since José Lima did it in the third game of the 2004 NLDS and the first for any MLB pitcher since Justin Verlander in Game 2 of the 2017 ALCS.

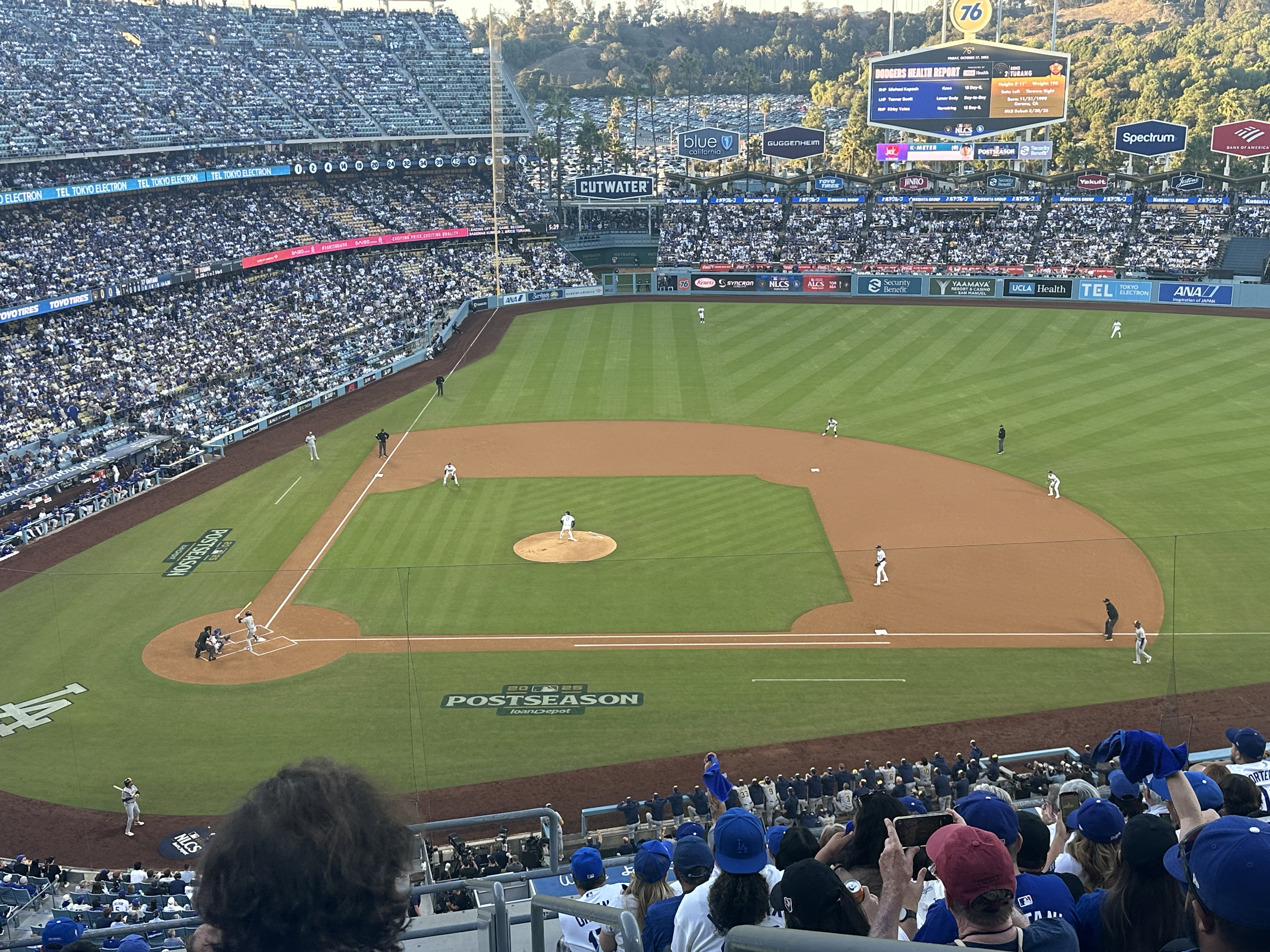
Shohei Ohtani throws the first pitch in Game 4 of the 2025 NLCS

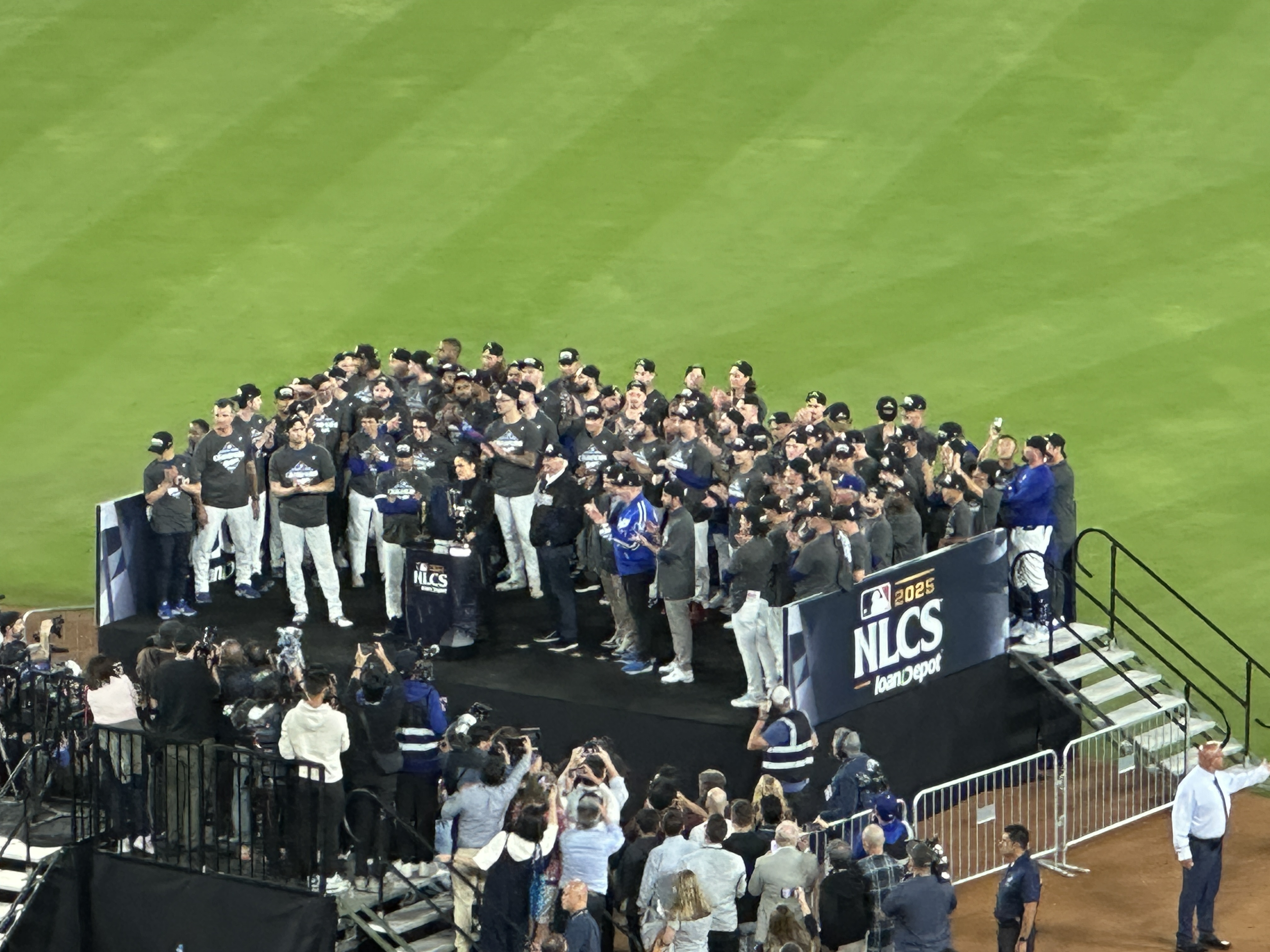
The Dodgers receive the NL Championship trophy

The series moved to Dodger Stadium for the third game. Tyler Glasnow struck out eight in 5 2/3 innings while allowing one run on three hits and three walks. Shohei Ohtani led off the game with a triple off Brewers' opener Aaron Ashby and then Betts drove him in with a double. Jacob Misiorowski struck out nine in five innings for the Brewers, but the Dodgers got two runs in the sixth on an RBI single by Tommy Edman and a throwing error by reliever Abner Uribe. The bullpens didn't allow any more runs, and the Dodgers moved to within one game of a series sweep with a 3–1 victory. In the next game, Ohtani started on the mound and pitched six scoreless innings with only two hits and three walks while striking out 10 batters. He also hit three home runs in the Dodgers' 5–1 victory, winning the NLCS Most Valuable Player Award and sending the Dodgers to their second straight NL pennant.

=== World Series ===
The Dodgers appeared in the World Series for the second straight year and the third time in the last six years. They faced the Toronto Blue Jays, the top seed in the American League. The series began at Rogers Centre as a result of the Blue Jays having one more win than the Dodgers during the regular season. In the opener, the Dodgers took an early 2–0 lead only for the Blue Jays to tie it up in the fourth on a two-run Daulton Varsho home run and then erupt for nine runs in the sixth. A pinch-hit grand slam by Addison Barger and a two-run homer by Alejandro Kirk were the key blows in that inning. Blake Snell struggled, allowing five runs on eight hits and three walks, in his five-plus innings. Shohei Ohtani hit a two-run home run in the seventh, but the Dodgers lost the game, 11–4. In the second game, Yoshinobu Yamamoto allowed only one run on four hits with no walks and eight strikeouts in a complete game, 5–1 victory. Max Muncy and Will Smith each homered in the seventh inning, and Smith drove in three of the five runs in the game. Yamamoto was the first pitcher to throw multiple complete games in the same postseason since Madison Bumgarner in 2014 and the first to do it in back-to-back games since Curt Schilling in 2001.

The series returned to Dodger Stadium for Game 3. Tyler Glasnow pitched 4 2/3 innings, allowing four runs (two earned) on five hits, and three walks. Teoscar Hernández homered in the second and had four hits in the game. Ohtani also had four hits, including two home runs and two doubles. The game went into extra innings tied at five and wound up going 18 innings before Freddie Freeman won it on a walk-off home run. Ohtani was intentionally walked four times in the game, a World Series record, and his nine times reaching base in the game was also a record. The 18 innings tied the World Series record, previously set by Game 3 of the 2018 World Series, also played at Dodger Stadium. However, the Blue Jays evened up the series again the next day with a 6–2 victory. A two-run home run by Vladimir Guerrero Jr. in the third off Ohtani and a four-run seventh were all they needed. Ohtani allowed four runs in six innings while striking out twice in three at-bats. In their final home game of the season, the Dodgers lost Game 5, 6–1. Davis Schneider and Guerrero homered back-to-back off Snell to start the game, and the Dodgers never recovered. Trey Yesavage struck out 12 and only gave up three hits and one run (a solo homer by Kiké Hernández) in seven innings.

Yamamoto pitched again in Game 6 back in Toronto, allowing one run on five hits with six strikeouts. The Dodgers got three runs in the third inning on an RBI double by Smith and then a two-run single by Mookie Betts. Glasnow came in for the ninth inning with the tying runs on second and third and managed to get out of the threat to preserve the 3–1 win and send the series to a seventh game. In Game 7, Ohtani started and gave up a three-run home run to Bo Bichette in the third inning to give the Blue Jays the early lead. The Dodgers scratched back with two runs on sacrifice flies in the fourth and sixth by Teoscar Hernández and Tommy Edman respectively. The Blue Jays got one more in the bottom of the sixth on a go-ahead RBI double by Andres Gimenez to extend the lead to 4–2. Max Muncy homered in the eighth and Miguel Rojas in the ninth to tie it up and send the game to extra innings. Yamamoto pitched 2 2/3 innings one day after his Game 6 start. Will Smith hit a solo home run in the 11th inning to put the Dodgers ahead, and then after Guerrero doubled to lead off the bottom of the inning, the Dodgers turned a game- and series-winning double play. Yamamoto was named the World Series Most Valuable Player after winning three games in the series. Yamamoto became the first pitcher to win three World Series games since Randy Johnson did it in 2001.

== Roster ==
2025 Los Angeles Dodgers
Roster
Pitchers: 43 Anthony Banda; 78 Ben Casparius; 56 Noah Davis; 40 Alexis Díaz; 86 Jack Dreyer; 62 Julián Fernández; 40 J. P. Feyereisen; 57 Luis García; 65 Paul Gervase; 31 Tyler Glasnow; 94 Yoendrys Gómez; 26 Tony Gonsolin; 33 Andrew Heaney; 60 Edgardo Henriquez; 22 Clayton Kershaw; 61 Will Klein; 96 Landon Knack; 45 Michael Kopech; 81 Jack Little; 65 Ryan Loutos; 85 Dustin May; 28 Bobby Miller; 17 Shohei Ohtani; 59 Evan Phillips; 11 Roki Sasaki; 64 Matt Sauer; 66 Tanner Scott; 80 Emmet Sheehan; 7 Blake Snell; 41 Brock Stewart; 41 Chris Stratton; 49 Blake Treinen; 58 Lou Trivino; 47 José Ureña; 51 Alex Vesia; 70 Justin Wrobleski; 18 Yoshinobu Yamamoto; 38 Kirby Yates	Catchers: 15 Austin Barnes; 52 Chuckie Robinson; 47 Ben Rortvedt; 68 Dalton Rushing; 16 Will Smith; Infielders: 50 Mookie Betts; 25 Tommy Edman; 67 Hunter Feduccia; 76 Alex Freeland; 5 Freddie Freeman; 8 Kiké Hernández; 6 Hyeseong Kim; 46 Buddy Kennedy; 13 Max Muncy; 72 Miguel Rojas	Outfielders: 12 Alex Call; 23 Michael Conforto; 75 Justin Dean; 37 Teoscar Hernández; 33 James Outman; 44 Andy Pages; 9 Eddie Rosario; 27 Esteury Ruiz; 3 Chris Taylor	Manager: 30 Dave Roberts; Coaches: 54 Josh Bard (bullpen); 98 Aaron Bates (hitting); 91 Dino Ebel (third base); 88 Bob Geren (field coordinator); 0 Danny Lehmann (bench); 89 Brandon McDaniel (development integration coach); 87 Connor McGuiness (assistant pitching); 99 Mark Prior (pitching); 71 Robert Van Scoyoc (hitting); 84 Chris Woodward (first base)

== Statistics ==
=== Batting ===
Stats in bold are the team leaders.

- Indicates league leader

Note: G = Games played; AB = At bats; R = Runs; H = Hits; 2B = Doubles; 3B = Triples; HR = Home runs; RBI = Runs batted in; BB = Walks; SO = Strikeouts; SB = Stolen bases; AVG = Batting average; OBP = On-base percentage; SLG = Slugging percentage; OPS = On base + slugging

Player	G	AB	R	H	2B	3B	HR	RBI	BB	SO	SB	AVG	OBP	SLG	OPS
Shohei Ohtani	**158**	**611**	**146***	**172**	25	**9**	**55**	**102**	**109**	**187**	**20**	.282	**.392**	**.622***	**1.014***
Mookie Betts	150	589	95	152	23	2	20	82	61	68	8	.258	.326	.406	.732
Andy Pages	156	581	74	158	27	1	27	86	29	135	14	.272	.313	.461	.774
Freddie Freeman	147	556	81	164	**39**	2	24	90	60	128	6	**.295**	.367	.502	.869
Teoscar Hernández	134	511	65	126	29	1	25	89	26	134	5	.247	.284	.454	.738
Michael Conforto	138	418	54	83	20	0	12	36	56	121	1	.199	.305	.333	.638
Will Smith	110	362	64	107	20	1	17	61	64	89	2	.296	.404	.497	.901
Tommy Edman	97	346	49	78	13	1	13	49	19	61	3	.225	.274	.382	.656
Max Muncy	100	313	48	76	10	2	19	67	64	83	4	.243	.376	.470	.846
Miguel Rojas	114	290	35	76	18	0	7	27	24	46	5	.262	.318	.397	.715
Kiké Hernández	93	232	30	47	8	0	10	35	18	68	0	.203	.255	.366	.621
Hyeseong Kim	71	161	19	45	6	1	3	17	7	52	13	.280	.314	.385	.699
Dalton Rushing	53	142	15	29	5	0	4	24	10	58	0	.204	.258	.324	.582
Alex Freeland	29	84	10	16	2	1	2	6	11	35	1	.190	.292	.310	.602
Alex Call	38	73	13	18	4	0	2	5	10	19	1	.247	.333	.384	.717
Ben Rortvedt	18	49	7	11	2	0	1	4	4	9	0	.224	.309	.327	.636
Austin Barnes	13	42	4	9	3	0	0	2	1	14	0	.214	.233	.286	.519
James Outman	22	39	8	4	1	0	2	4	4	18	0	.103	.205	.282	.487
Chris Taylor	28	35	4	7	2	0	0	2	0	13	0	.200	.200	.257	.457
Esteury Ruiz	19	21	2	4	0	0	1	2	2	8	4	.190	.261	.333	.594
Buddy Kennedy	7	17	1	1	0	0	0	1	5	0	0	.059	.111	.059	.170
Eddie Rosario	2	4	0	1	0	0	0	0	0	0	0	.250	.250	.250	.500
Justin Dean	18	2	0	0	0	0	0	0	0	1	1	.000	.000	.000	.000
Hunter Feduccia	2	2	0	0	0	0	0	0	1	1	0	.000	.333	.000	.333
Chuckie Robinson	1	1	1	0	0	0	0	0	0	0	0	.000	.000	.000	.000
**Totals**	**162**	**5481**	**825**	**1384**	**257**	**21**	**244**	**791**	**580**	**1353**	**88**	**.253**	**.327**	**.441**	**.768**

Source:Baseball Reference

=== Pitching ===
List does not include position players. Stats in bold are the team leaders.

Note: W = Wins; L = Losses; ERA = Earned run average; G = Games pitched; GS = Games started; SV = Saves; IP = Innings pitched; H = Hits allowed; R = Runs allowed; ER = Earned runs allowed; BB = Walks allowed; K = Strikeouts

Player	W	L	ERA	G	GS	SV	IP	H	R	ER	BB	K
Yoshinobu Yamamoto	**12**	**8**	**2.49**	30	**30**	0	**173.2**	**113**	53	48	**59**	**201**
Clayton Kershaw	11	2	3.36	23	22	0	111.2	102	46	42	35	84
Dustin May	6	7	4.85	19	18	0	104.0	97	**60**	**56**	43	97
Tyler Glasnow	4	3	3.19	18	18	0	90.1	56	33	32	43	106
Ben Casparius	7	5	4.64	46	3	2	77.2	78	41	40	21	71
Jack Dreyer	3	2	2.95	67	5	4	76.1	56	26	25	24	74
Emmet Sheehan	6	3	2.82	15	12	0	73.1	49	29	23	22	89
Justin Wrobleski	5	5	4.32	24	2	2	66.2	65	34	32	17	76
Anthony Banda	5	1	3.18	**71**	1	0	65.0	45	23	23	34	61
Blake Snell	5	4	2.35	11	11	0	61.1	51	21	16	26	72
Alex Vesia	4	2	3.02	68	0	5	59.2	37	21	20	22	80
Tanner Scott	1	4	4.74	61	0	**23**	57.0	54	33	30	18	60
Shohei Ohtani	1	1	2.87	14	14	0	47.0	40	15	15	9	62
Landon Knack	3	2	4.89	10	7	1	42.1	40	25	23	19	42
Kirby Yates	4	3	5.23	50	0	3	41.1	38	26	24	17	52
Roki Sasaki	1	1	4.46	10	8	0	36.1	30	18	18	22	28
Tony Gonsolin	3	2	5.00	7	7	0	36.0	33	21	20	18	38
Matt Sauer	2	1	6.37	10	1	1	29.2	35	23	21	8	24
Luis García	2	0	5.27	28	0	0	27.1	34	17	16	16	24
Blake Treinen	2	7	5.40	32	0	2	26.2	30	18	16	19	36
Lou Trivino	2	1	3.76	26	2	0	26.1	29	12	11	8	18
Edgardo Henriquez	2	1	2.37	22	0	1	19.0	17	5	5	5	18
Will Klein	1	1	2.35	14	0	0	15.1	14	6	4	10	21
Michael Kopech	0	0	2.45	14	0	0	11.0	6	3	3	13	12
Alexis Díaz	1	0	5.00	9	0	0	9.0	7	5	5	2	9
Noah Davis	0	1	19.50	5	0	0	6.0	10	14	13	5	8
Evan Phillips	0	0	0.00	7	0	1	5.2	4	0	0	2	6
Bobby Miller	0	0	12.60	2	1	0	5.0	11	7	7	2	7
Yoendrys Gómez	0	0	14.54	3	0	1	4.1	10	7	7	2	6
Chris Stratton	0	0	6.75	3	0	0	4.0	3	3	3	2	6
Brock Stewart	0	1	4.91	4	0	0	3.2	6	2	2	2	3
Jack Little	0	0	6.00	2	0	0	3.0	4	2	2	1	2
Ryan Loutos	0	0	15.00	2	0	0	3.0	4	5	5	2	2
José Ureña	0	0	3.00	2	0	0	3.0	4	1	1	1	2
Julián Fernández	0	0	9.00	1	0	0	2.0	2	2	2	1	1
J. P. Feyereisen	0	1	13.50	2	0	0	2.0	8	4	3	1	2
Paul Gervase	0	0	4.50	1	0	0	2.0	2	1	1	1	2
Andrew Heaney	0	0	13.50	1	0	0	2.0	4	3	3	1	2
**Totals**	**93**	**69**	**3.95**	**162**	**162**	**46**	**1441.0**	**1250**	**683**	**633**	**563**	**1505**

Source:Baseball Reference

== Awards and honors ==
Recipient	Award	Date awarded	Ref.
Andy Pages	Co-National League Player of the Week Award (April 21–27) (with Eugenio Suárez)	April 28, 2025	
Yoshinobu Yamamoto	National League Pitcher of the Month Award (April)	May 2, 2025	
Freddie Freeman	National League Player of the Week Award (May 5–11)	May 12, 2025	
Shohei Ohtani	National League Player of the Month Award (May)	June 3, 2025	
Shohei Ohtani	2025 Major League Baseball All-Star Game (Starter)	June 26, 2025	
Will Smith	2025 Major League Baseball All-Star Game (Starter)	July 2, 2025	
Freddie Freeman	2025 Major League Baseball All-Star Game (Starter)	July 2, 2025	
Yoshinobu Yamamoto	2025 Major League Baseball All-Star Game	July 6, 2025	
Clayton Kershaw	2025 Major League Baseball All-Star Game	July 6, 2025	
Mookie Betts	National League Player of the Week Award (September 8–14)	September 15, 2025	
Miguel Rojas	Roy Campanella Award	September 20, 2025	
Yoshinobu Yamamoto	National League Pitcher of the Month Award (September)	September 30, 2025	
Shohei Ohtani	National League Championship Series Most Valuable Player Award	October 17, 2025	
Mookie Betts	Fielding Bible Award (Shortstop)	October 23, 2025	
Mookie Betts	Roberto Clemente Award	October 27, 2025	
Yoshinobu Yamamoto	World Series Most Valuable Player Award	November 1, 2025	
Shohei Ohtani	Silver Slugger Award (Designated hitter)	November 6, 2025	
Los Angeles Dodgers	Silver Slugger Award (Team)	November 6, 2025	
Shohei Ohtani	National League Most Valuable Player Award	November 13, 2025	
Shohei Ohtani	Hank Aaron Award	November 13, 2025	
Shohei Ohtani	Edgar Martínez Award	November 13, 2025	
Shohei Ohtani	All-MLB Team	November 13, 2025	
Yoshinobu Yamamoto	All-MLB Team	November 13, 2025	
Will Smith	All-MLB Team (second team)	November 13, 2025	
Rick Monday	Bob Feller Act of Valor Award (Patriot Award)	November 19, 2025	
Shohei Ohtani	Associated Press Male Athlete of the Year	December 9, 2025	
Yoshinobu Yamamoto	Babe Ruth Award	December 15, 2025	

== Transactions ==
=== March ===
- On March 17, placed RHPs Brusdar Graterol (right shoulder surgery) and Michael Grove (right shoulder surgery) on the 60-day injured list, placed RHP Tony Gonsolin (back tightness), RHP Emmet Sheehan (right elbow surgery), RHP Kyle Hurt (right elbow surgery), LHP Clayton Kershaw (left toe surgery), RHP Edgardo Henriquez (left foot fracture), and RHP Evan Phillips (right rotator cuff strain) on the 15-day injured list, purchased the contracts of RHPs Luis García and Roki Sasaki from AAA Oklahoma City.
- On March 18, optioned LHP Justin Wrobleski to AAA Oklahoma City, purchased the contract of RHP Matt Sauer from AAA Oklahoma City, and transferred LHP Clayton Kershaw from the 15-day injured list to the 60-day injured list.
- On March 19, optioned RHP Landon Knack, RHP Matt Sauer and OF James Outman to AAA Oklahoma City.
- On March 27, acquired RHP Noah Davis from the Boston Red Sox in exchange for cash considerations and optioned him to AAA Oklahoma City. Transferred RHP Emmet Sheehan from the 15-day injured list to the 60-day injured list.

=== April ===
- On April 2, acquired OF Esteury Ruiz from the Athletics in exchange for minor leaguer Carlos Duran and assigned him to AAA Oklahoma City, transferred RHP Kyle Hurt from the 15-day injured list to the 60-day injured list.
- On April 3, placed 1B Freddie Freeman on the 10-day injured list with a right ankle sprain.
- On April 4, recalled C Hunter Feduccia from AAA Oklahoma City.
- On April 6, placed LHP Blake Snell on the 15-day injured list with left shoulder inflammation and recalled RHP Matt Sauer from AAA Oklahoma City.
- On April 8, recalled LHP Justin Wrobleski from AAA Oklahoma City and optioned RHP Matt Sauer to AAA Oklahoma City.
- On April 9, recalled RHP Landon Knack from AAA Oklahoma City and optioned LHP Justin Wrobleski to AAA Oklahoma City.
- On April 10, optioned C Hunter Feduccia to AAA Oklahoma City.
- On April 11, activated 1B Freddie Freeman from the 10-day injured list.
- On April 16, recalled RHP Bobby Miller from AAA Oklahoma City and optioned RHP Landon Knack to AAA Oklahoma City.
- On April 17, optioned RHP Bobby Miller to AAA Oklahoma City.
- On April 18, recalled RHP Noah Davis from AAA Oklahoma City, purchased the contract of OF Eddie Rosario from AAA Oklahoma City, placed DH Shohei Ohtani on the paternity list and transferred RHP Edgardo Henriquez from the 15-day injured list to the 60-day injured list.
- On April 19, activated RHP Evan Phillips from the 15-day injured list and placed RHP Blake Treinen on the 15-day injured list with right forearm tightness.
- On April 20, activated DH Shohei Ohtani from the paternity list and designated OF Eddie Rosario for assignment.
- On April 25, claimed RHP Yoendrys Gómez off waivers from the New York Yankees.
- On April 26, activated RHP Yoendrys Gómez and optioned RHP Noah Davis to AAA Oklahoma City.
- On April 28, placed RHP Tyler Glasnow on the 15-day injured list with right shoulder inflammation and recalled RHP Noah Davis from AAA Oklahoma City.
- On April 29, optioned RHP Noah Davis to AAA Oklahoma City and recalled RHP Matt Sauer from AAA Oklahoma City.
- On April 30, activated RHP Tony Gonsolin from the 15-day injured list, and optioned RHP Matt Sauer to AAA Oklahoma City.

=== May ===
- On May 1, claimed RHP J. P. Feyereisen off waivers from the Arizona Diamondbacks, acquired RHP Ryan Loutos from the St. Louis Cardinals in exchange for cash considerations, optioned both players to AAA Oklahoma City, and transferred RHPs Michael Kopech and Blake Treinen from the 15-day injured list to the 60-day injured list.
- On May 3, placed IF/OF Tommy Edman on the 10-day injured list with right ankle inflammation and recalled IF Hyeseong Kim from AAA Oklahoma City.
- On May 6, recalled RHP J. P. Feyereisen and OF James Outman from AAA Oklahoma City, placed OF Teoscar Hernández on the 10-day injured list with a left groin strain and designated RHP Yoendrys Gómez for assignment.
- On May 7, placed RHP Evan Phillips on the 15-day injured list with right forearm discomfort, optioned RHP J. P. Feyereisen to AAA Oklahoma City and recalled RHPs Landon Knack and Matt Sauer from AAA Oklahoma City.
- On May 12, acquired OF Steward Berroa form the Toronto Blue Jays for cash considerations and optioned him to AAA Oklahoma City.
- On May 13, placed RHP Roki Sasaki on the 15-day injured list with right shoulder impingement, and recalled RHP J. P. Feyereisen from AAA Oklahoma City.
- On May 14, purchased the contract of C Dalton Rushing from AAA Oklahoma City and designated C Austin Barnes for assignment.
- On May 15, optioned RHP J. P. Feyereisen to AAA Oklahoma City and recalled LHP Justin Wrobleski from AAA Oklahoma City.
- On May 16, optioned LHP Justin Wrobleski to AAA Oklahoma City and recalled RHP Ryan Loutos from AAA Oklahoma City.
- On May 17, activated LHP Clayton Kershaw from the 60-day injured list, optioned RHP Ryan Loutos to AAA Oklahoma City and transferred LHP Blake Snell from the 15-day injured list to the 60-day injured list.
- On May 18, placed RHP Kirby Yates on the 15-day injured list with a right hamstring strain, activated IF/OF Tommy Edman from the 10-day injured list, purchased the contract of RHP Lou Trivino from AAA Oklahoma City and released IF/OF Chris Taylor.
- On May 19, activated OF Teoscar Hernández from the 10-day injured list and optioned OF James Outman to AAA Oklahoma City.
- On May 24, optioned RHP Matt Sauer to AAA Oklahoma City and recalled RHP Bobby Miller from AAA Oklahoma City.
- On May 25, signed RHP Chris Stratton, optioned RHP Bobby Miller to AAA Oklahoma City and designated RHP J. P. Feyereisen for assignment.
- On May 29, acquired RHP Alexis Díaz from the Cincinnati Reds in exchange for minor league pitcher Mike Villani and transferred RHP Evan Phillips from the 15-day injured list to the 60-day injured list.
- On May 31, acquired C Chuckie Robinson off waivers from the Los Angeles Angels, assigned him to AAA Oklahoma City, and transferred RHP Tyler Glasnow from the 15-day injured list to the 60-day injured list.

=== June ===
- On June 1, placed RHP Luis García on the 15-day injured list with a right adductor strain and recalled RHP Noah Davis from AAA Oklahoma City.
- On June 2, acquired RHP Will Klein from the Seattle Mariners in exchange for minor league pitcher Joe Jacques, recalled RHP Ryan Loutos from AAA Oklahoma City, optioned RHP Noah Davis to AAA Oklahoma City, and designated RHP Chris Stratton for assignment.
- On June 3, signed RHP José Ureña, optioned RHP Will Klein to AAA Oklahoma City and designated C Chuckie Robinson for assignment.
- On June 6, optioned RHP Landon Knack to AAA Oklahoma City and recalled LHP Justin Wrobleski from AAA Oklahoma City. Signed RHP Chris Stratton and designated RHP Ryan Loutos for assignment.
- On June 7, placed RHP Tony Gonsolin on the 15-day injured list with right elbow discomfort, activated RHP Kirby Yates from the 15-day injured list and RHP Michael Kopech from the 60-day injured list and designated RHP Chris Stratton for assignment.
- On June 10, recalled RHP Matt Sauer from AAA Oklahoma City and designated RHP José Ureña for assignment.
- On June 18, activated RHP Emmet Sheehan from the 60-day injured list and optioned RHP Matt Sauer to AAA Oklahoma City.
- On June 19, optioned RHP Emmet Sheehan to AAA Oklahoma City, purchased the contract of RHP Jack Little from AAA Oklahoma City and transferred RHP Tony Gonsolin from the 15-day injured list to the 60-day injured list.
- On June 20, optioned RHP Jack Little to AAA Oklahoma City, recalled RHP Will Klein from AAA Oklahoma City. Acquired LHP Zach Penrod from the Boston Red Sox for cash considerations and transferred RHP Roki Sasaki from the 15-day injured list to the 60-day injured list.
- On June 26, optioned RHP Will Klein to AAA Oklahoma City and activated RHP Luis García from the 15-day injured list.
- On June 29, recalled RHP Noah Davis from AAA Oklahoma City, designated RHP Luis García for assignment, activated RHP Edgardo Henriquez from the 60-day injured list and optioned him to AAA Oklahoma City.

=== July ===
- On July 1, placed RHP Michael Kopech on the 15-day injured list with right knee inflammation and recalled RHP Will Klein from AAA Oklahoma City.
- On July 3, placed 3B Max Muncy on the 10-day injured list with a left knee bone bruise, recalled OF Esteury Ruiz from AAA Oklahoma City, claimed IF CJ Alexander off waivers from the New York Yankees, and designated OF Steward Berroa for assignment.
- On July 5, optioned RHP Noah Davis to AAA Oklahoma City and recalled RHP Jack Little from AAA Oklahoma City.
- On July 6, optioned RHP Jack Little to AAA Oklahoma City and recalled RHP Emmet Sheehan from AAA Oklahoma City.
- On July 7, placed IF/OF Kiké Hernández on the 10-day injured list with left elbow inflammation, optioned LHP Justin Wrobleski to AAA Oklahoma City, recalled OF James Outman from AAA Oklahoma City, purchased the contract of RHP Julián Fernández from AAA Oklahoma City and designated IF CJ Alexander for assignment.
- On July 8, optioned RHP Julián Fernández to AAA Oklahoma City and recalled RHP Alexis Díaz from AAA Oklahoma City.
- On July 9, activated RHP Tyler Glasnow from the 60-day injured list, optioned RHP Alexis Díaz to AAA Oklahoma City and transferred RHP Michael Kopech from the 15-day injured list to the 60-day injured list.
- On July 11, claimed RHP Nick Nastrini off waivers from the Miami Marlins and designated RHP Noah Davis for assignment.
- On July 18, outrighted RHP Nick Nastrini to AAA Oklahoma City.
- On July 21, recalled RHP Edgardo Henriquez from AAA Oklahoma City and designated RHP Lou Trivino for assignment.
- On July 22, placed LHP Tanner Scott on the 15-day injured list with left elbow inflammation and recalled RHP Alexis Díaz from AAA Oklahoma City.
- On July 27, optioned RHP Will Klein and RHP Edgardo Henriquez to AAA Oklahoma City, recalled LHP Justin Wrobleski from AAA Oklahoma City and activated RHP Blake Treinen from the 60-day injured list.
- On July 29, placed IF Hyeseong Kim on the 10-day injured list with left shoulder bursitis and purchased the contract of IF Alex Freeland from AAA Oklahoma City.
- On July 31, traded C Hunter Feduccia to the Tampa Bay Rays in exchange for RHP Paul Gervase and minor leaguers Ben Rortvedt and Adam Serwinowski. Acquired RHP Brock Stewart from the Minnesota Twins in exchange for OF James Outman. Acquired OF Alex Call from the Washington Nationals in exchange for minor leaguers Sean Paul Liñan and Eriq Swan. Traded RHP Dustin May to the Boston Red Sox in exchange for minor leaguers James Tibbs III and Zach Ehrhard.

=== August ===
- On August 1, activated OF Alex Call and RHPs Brock Stewart and Paul Gervase, placed RHP Kirby Yates on the 15-day injured list with lower back pain.
- On August 2, activated LHP Blake Snell from the 60-day injured list, optioned RHP Paul Gervase to AAA Oklahoma City and designated LHP Zach Penrod for assignment.
- On August 4, claimed 1B Luken Baker off waivers from the St. Louis Cardinals, optioned him to AAA Oklahoma City and designated RHP Jack Little for assignment. Activated 3B Max Muncy from the 10-day injured list and placed IF/OF Tommy Edman on the 10-day injured list with a sprained right ankle.
- On August 8, purchased the contract of OF Justin Dean from AAA Oklahoma City, optioned OF Esteury Ruiz to AAA Oklahoma City and designated 1B Luken Baker for assignment.
- On August 12, placed RHP Brock Stewart on the 15-day injured list with right shoulder inflammation and recalled RHP Edgardo Henriquez from AAA Oklahoma City.
- On August 15, placed 3B Max Muncy on the 10-day injured list with an oblique strain, claimed IF Buddy Kennedy off waivers from the Toronto Blue Jays and designated RHP Julián Fernández for assignment.
- On August 20, optioned RHP Alexis Díaz to AAA Oklahoma City and recalled RHP Paul Gervase from AAA Oklahoma City.
- On August 21, optioned RHP Paul Gervase to AAA Oklahoma City and recalled RHP Matt Sauer from AAA Oklahoma City.
- On August 22, activated LHP Tanner Scott from the 15-day injured list and optioned RHP Matt Sauer to AAA Oklahoma City.
- On August 23, placed LHP Blake Snell on the paternity list and activated RHP Kirby Yates from the 15-day injured list.
- On August 25, activated IF/OF Kiké Hernández from the 10-day injured list and designated IF Buddy Kennedy for assignment.
- On August 26, activated LHP Blake Snell from the paternity list and placed LHP Alex Vesia on the 15-day injured list with a right oblique strain.

=== September ===
- On September 1, activated IF Hyeseong Kim from the 10-day injured list and RHP Michael Kopech from the 60-day injured list.
- On September 4, purchased the contract of C Ben Rortvedt from AAA Oklahoma City, optioned IF Alex Freeland to AAA Oklahoma City and designated RHP Alexis Díaz for assignment.
- On September 6, placed C Dalton Rushing on the 10-day injured list with right shin contusion, purchased the contract of C Chuckie Robinson from AAA Oklahoma City and designated RHP Matt Sauer for assignment.
- On September 8, activated 3B Max Muncy from the 10-day injured list and optioned C Chuckie Robinson to AAA Oklahoma City.
- On September 9, activated LHP Alex Vesia from the 15-day injured list and optioned RHP Ben Casparius to AAA Oklahoma City.
- On September 10, activated IF/OF Tommy Edman from the 10-day injured list and optioned OF Justin Dean to AAA Oklahoma City.
- On September 13, placed C Will Smith on the 10-day injured list with a right hand contusion and recalled C Chuckie Robinson from AAA Oklahoma City.
- On September 16, activated C Dalton Rushing from the 10-day injured list and optioned C Chuckie Robinson to AAA Oklahoma City.
- On September 19, placed RHP Michael Kopech on the 15-day injured list with right knee inflammation and recalled RHP Will Klein from AAA Oklahoma City.
- On September 21, C Chuckie Robinson claimed off waivers by the Atlanta Braves.
- On September 24, placed RHP Kirby Yates on the 15-day injured list with a right hamstring strain and activated RHP Roki Sasaki from the 60-day injured list.
- On September 27, purchased the contract of LHP Andrew Heaney from AAA Oklahoma City, optioned RHP Will Klein to AAA Oklahoma City, recalled RHP Nick Frasso from AAA Oklahoma City and transferred him to the 60-day injured list.
- On September 28, recalled RHP Landon Knack from AAA Oklahoma City and optioned LHP Andrew Heaney to AAA Oklahoma City.

== Farm system ==
After the 2024 season, the Oklahoma City AAA franchise changed its name and branding to the Oklahoma City Comets, an homage to Oklahoma native Mickey Mantle's nickname, "the Commerce Comet", and to honor the city's ties to the aerospace industry.

Level	Team	League	Manager	W	L	Position
AAA	Oklahoma City Comets	Pacific Coast League (East Division)	Scott Hennessey	84	65	1st place
AA	Tulsa Drillers	Texas League (North Division)	Eric Wedge	66	72	5th place Lost in playoffs
High A	Great Lakes Loons	Midwest League (East Division)	Jair Fernandez	72	58	3rd place
Low A	Rancho Cucamonga Quakes	California League (South Division)	John Shoemaker	70	62	1st place Lost in playoffs.
Rookie	ACL Dodgers	Arizona Complex League (West Division)	Juan Apodaca	29	31	4th place
Foreign Rookie	DSL Dodgers Bautista	Dominican Summer League (North Division)	Sergio Mendez	17	37	6th place
Foreign Rookie	DSL Dodgers Mega	Dominican Summer League (Northwest Division)	Leury Bonilla	25	30	4th place

=== Minor League awards and honors ===
Branch Rickey Awards:

Dodgers Minor League Player of the Year: Eduardo Quintero
Dodgers Minor League Pitcher of the Year: Christian Zazueta

All-Star Futures Game

Outfielders Josue De Paula & Zyhir Hope
Futures Game MVP: Josue De Paula

Pacific Coast League All-Stars

Outfielder Esteury Ruiz
Outfielder Ryan Ward (also League MVP)

Midwest League All-Stars

Outfielder Josue De Paula
Outfielder Kendall George

California League All-Stars

Second baseman Elijah Hainline
Outfielder Eduardo Quintero (also League MVP)
Pitcher Christian Zazueta

Arizona Complex League All-Stars

Outfielder Ching-Hsien Ko
Utility player Emil Morales

== Major League Baseball draft ==
The 2025 Draft was held July 13–14, 2025. The Dodgers had 21 picks in the draft. Their first round pick was dropped 10 spots by virtue of them surpassing the third luxury tax threshold. They also gained a competitive balance pick between the first and second rounds as part of their trading Gavin Lux to the Cincinnati Reds.

2025 draft picks

Round	Name	Position	School	Signed	Career span	Highest level
1	Zachary Root	LHP	University of Arkansas	Yes	2026–present	AA
Comp A	Charles Davalan	OF	University of Arkansas	Yes	2025–present	AA
2	Cam Leiter	RHP	Florida State University	Yes	2026–present	A+
3	Landyn Vidourek	OF	University of Cincinnati	Yes	2025–present	A
4	Aidan West	SS	Long Reach High School	Yes	2026–present	A
5	Davion Hickson	RHP	Rice	Yes	2026–present	Rookie
6	Mason Ligenza	OF	Tamaqua Area High School	No		
7	Mason Estrada	RHP	MIT	Yes	2026–present	A
8	Jack O'Connor	RHP	Virginia	Yes	2026–present	A
9	Connor O'Neal	C	Southeast Louisiana	Yes	2026–present	A
10	Jacob Frost	LHP	Kansas State	Yes	2026–present	A+
11	Dylan Tate	RHP	Oklahoma	Yes	2025–present	A
12	Logan Lunceford	RHP	Wake Forest	Yes	2026–present	A
13	Robby Porco	RHP	West Virginia	Yes	2026–present	A+
14	Davis Chastain	RHP	Georgia	Yes	2025–present	A+
15	Matt Lanzenforfer	LHP	Virginia	Yes	2026–present	A+
16	AJ Soldra	OF	Seton Hall	Yes	2026–present	A
17	Sam Horn	RHP	Missouri	Yes		
18	Finn Edwards	RHP	Iowa Western	No		
19	Anson Aroz	C	Oregon	Yes	2026–present	A+
20	Shane Brinham	LHP	Handsworth Secondary School	No		
Ref.:
