= 2026 Milwaukee Brewers season =

57th season in franchise history; 1st World Series pennant

2026 Milwaukee Brewers
- World Series champions National League champions National League Central champions
- The Brewers celebrate their first World Series title with a parade in Milwaukee
- League: National League
- Division: Central
- Ballpark: American Family Field
- City: Milwaukee, Wisconsin, United States
- Record: 103–59 (.636)
- Divisional place: 1st
- Owner: Mark Attanasio
- President of baseball operations: Matt Arnold
- General manager: Matt Arnold
- Manager: Pat Murphy
- Television: MLB Local Media (Brian Anderson, Bill Schroeder, Jeff Levering, Tim Dillard, Vinny Rottino, Sophia Minnaert) Telemundo Wisconsin (Spanish-language coverage, Sunday home games; Hector Molina, Kevin Holden)
- Radio: 620 WTMJ; Milwaukee Brewers Radio Network (Jeff Levering, Lane Grindle, Josh Maurer)
- Stats: ESPN.com; Baseball Reference

The 2026 Milwaukee Brewers season was the 57th season for the Brewers in Milwaukee, their 29th in the National League, and their 58th overall. Their 103–59 record improved on their previous season's then-franchise record 97–65 season, marking the first time in franchise history that the team surpassed 100 wins in a season, and giving Milwaukee the best record in MLB in 2026. The Brewers won their first National League Pennant in franchise history and second overall after winning the American League Pennant in 1982. They advanced to their second World Series to face the Tampa Bay Rays. The season ended with the Brewers defeating the Rays in five games, capturing the franchise's first World Series title in its history.

The Brewers clinched a postseason berth on September 11 with a 20–0 shutout against the Cincinnati Reds, just two runs short of the franchise record they had tied earlier in the season in a 22–0 win against the Seattle Mariners on August 18th. It was their eighth postseason appearance in the last nine seasons. On September 15, Milwaukee won 5–1 against the Pittsburgh Pirates. The same night, the Chicago Cubs lost to the Atlanta Braves 6–3, allowing Milwaukee to clinch the NL Central title for the fourth consecutive season. On September 24, they won their 100th game of the season against the Philadelphia Phillies at Citizens Bank Park. The Brewers finished with 103 wins, setting a new franchise record.

The Brewers defeated the San Diego Padres in the National League Division Series in four games and advanced to the National League Championship Series for the second year in a row, where they swept the two-time defending champion Los Angeles Dodgers in four games. With the win, they became the second team in Major League Baseball history (after the Houston Astros) to win pennants in both American and National leagues. The Brewers advanced to the World Series for the first time since 1982. They defeated the Tampa Bay Rays in five games to win their first World Series title in franchise history. Their 114–61 overall record ranked fourth best in MLB history, as of 2026.

To celebrate the World Series win, the city held a celebratory parade on Milwaukee streets and a rally on the grounds of Summerfest on October 30. The Milwaukee Police Department stated that the events attracted 750,000 people, a total that would make it the largest one-day gathering in state history. However, at least one local news outlet cast doubt on the claim.

In terms accolades won, Jacob Misiorowski, who led MLB in earned run average (ERA) and strikeouts, won the National League Cy Young award in his second season. Manager Pat Murphy captured his third consecutive National League Manager of the Year award.

== Regular season ==
=== Standings ===
==== National League Central ====
NL Central
| Team | W | L | Pct. | GB | Home | Road |
|---|---|---|---|---|---|---|
| Milwaukee Brewers | 103 | 59 | .636 | — | 55‍–‍26 | 48‍–‍33 |
| Chicago Cubs | 89 | 73 | .549 | 14 | 46‍–‍35 | 43‍–‍38 |
| Pittsburgh Pirates | 82 | 80 | .506 | 21 | 44‍–‍37 | 38‍–‍43 |
| St. Louis Cardinals | 77 | 85 | .475 | 26 | 38‍–‍43 | 39‍–‍42 |
| Cincinnati Reds | 75 | 87 | .463 | 28 | 38‍–‍43 | 37‍–‍44 |

==== National League Wild Card ====
Division leaders
| Team | W | L | Pct. |
|---|---|---|---|
| Milwaukee Brewers | 103 | 59 | .636 |
| Los Angeles Dodgers | 100 | 62 | .617 |
| Atlanta Braves | 94 | 68 | .580 |

Wild Card teams (Top 3 teams qualify for postseason)
| Team | W | L | Pct. | GB |
|---|---|---|---|---|
| San Diego Padres | 91 | 71 | .562 | +3 |
| Chicago Cubs | 89 | 73 | .549 | +1 |
| Philadelphia Phillies | 88 | 74 | .543 | — |
| Arizona Diamondbacks | 86 | 76 | .531 | 2 |
| Pittsburgh Pirates | 82 | 80 | .506 | 6 |
| Miami Marlins | 80 | 82 | .494 | 8 |
| St. Louis Cardinals | 77 | 85 | .475 | 11 |
| Washington Nationals | 77 | 85 | .475 | 11 |
| Cincinnati Reds | 75 | 87 | .463 | 13 |
| New York Mets | 74 | 88 | .457 | 14 |
| San Francisco Giants | 65 | 97 | .401 | 23 |
| Colorado Rockies | 58 | 104 | .358 | 30 |

==== Record vs. opponents ====
2026 National League record Source: MLB Standings Grid – 2026
| Team | AZ | ATL | CHC | CIN | COL | LAD | MIA | MIL | NYM | PHI | PIT | SD | SF | STL | WSH | AL |
|---|---|---|---|---|---|---|---|---|---|---|---|---|---|---|---|---|
| Arizona | — | 4–3 | 2–4 | 4–2 | 9–4 | 7–6 | 1–5 | 2–4 | 4–2 | 3–3 | 3–3 | 6–7 | 10–3 | 5–2 | 2–4 | 24–24 |
| Atlanta | 3–4 | — | 3–3 | 3–3 | 6–0 | 5–1 | 9–4 | 3–3 | 6–7 | 9–4 | 5–1 | 3–4 | 1–5 | 2–4 | 9–4 | 27–21 |
| Chicago | 4–2 | 3–3 | — | 9–4 | 3–3 | 4–2 | 3–3 | 4–9 | 7–0 | 6–1 | 7–6 | 5–1 | 3–3 | 6–7 | 3–3 | 22–26 |
| Cincinnati | 2–4 | 3–3 | 4–9 | — | 4–2 | 1–6 | 3–4 | 4–9 | 4–2 | 3–3 | 6–7 | 3–3 | 3–3 | 5–8 | 1–5 | 29–19 |
| Colorado | 4–9 | 0–6 | 3–3 | 2–4 | — | 3–10 | 2–5 | 1–5 | 4–2 | 2–4 | 3–3 | 2–11 | 7–6 | 2–4 | 3–4 | 20–28 |
| Los Angeles | 6–7 | 1–5 | 2–4 | 6–1 | 10–3 | — | 2–4 | 3–4 | 5–1 | 4–2 | 5–1 | 8–5 | 9–4 | 2–4 | 6–0 | 31–17 |
| Miami | 5–1 | 4–9 | 3–3 | 4–3 | 5–2 | 4–2 | — | 1–5 | 6–7 | 5–8 | 4–2 | 0–6 | 4–2 | 4–2 | 9–4 | 22–26 |
| Milwaukee | 4–2 | 3–3 | 9–4 | 9–4 | 5–1 | 4–3 | 5–1 | — | 4–2 | 4–2 | 6–7 | 2–4 | 3–4 | 11–2 | 2–4 | 32–16 |
| New York | 2–4 | 7–6 | 0–7 | 2–4 | 2–4 | 1–5 | 7–6 | 2–4 | — | 6–7 | 4–2 | 4–2 | 5–2 | 2–4 | 7–6 | 23–25 |
| Philadelphia | 3–3 | 4–9 | 1–6 | 3–3 | 4–2 | 2–4 | 8–5 | 2–4 | 7–6 | — | 5–2 | 6–0 | 4–2 | 4–2 | 9–4 | 26–22 |
| Pittsburgh | 3–3 | 1–5 | 6–7 | 7–6 | 3–3 | 1–5 | 2–4 | 7–6 | 2–4 | 2–5 | — | 3–3 | 3–3 | 6–7 | 4–3 | 32–16 |
| San Diego | 7–6 | 4–3 | 1–5 | 3–3 | 11–2 | 5–8 | 6–0 | 4–2 | 2–4 | 0–6 | 3–3 | — | 9–4 | 3–4 | 4–2 | 29–19 |
| San Francisco | 3–10 | 5–1 | 3–3 | 3–3 | 6–7 | 4–9 | 2–4 | 4–3 | 2–5 | 2–4 | 3–3 | 4–9 | — | 5–1 | 3–3 | 16–32 |
| St. Louis | 2–5 | 4–2 | 7–6 | 8–5 | 4–2 | 4–2 | 2–4 | 2–11 | 4–2 | 2–4 | 7–6 | 4–3 | 1–5 | — | 3–3 | 23–25 |
| Washington | 4–2 | 4–9 | 3–3 | 5–1 | 4–3 | 0–6 | 4–9 | 4–2 | 6–7 | 4–9 | 3–4 | 2–4 | 3–3 | 3–3 | — | 28–20 |

Updated with the results of all games through September 27, 2026.

=== Game log ===
Legend
| | Brewers win |
| | Brewers loss |
| | Postponement |
| | Clinched playoff spot |
| | Clinched division |
| **Bold** | Brewers team member |

2026 regular season game log: 103–59 (Home: 55–26; Away: 48–33)
March/April: 16–14 (Home: 10–8; Road: 6–6)

| # | Date | Opponent | Score | Win | Loss | Save | Attendance | Record | Box/ Streak |
|---|---|---|---|---|---|---|---|---|---|
| 1 | March 26 | White Sox | 14–2 | **Misiorowski** (1–0) | Smith (0–1) | – | 43,001 | 1–0 | W1 |
| 2 | March 28 | White Sox | 6–1 | **Ashby** (1–0) | Burke (0–1) | — | 36,030 | 2–0 | W2 |
| 3 | March 29 | White Sox | 9–7 | **Woodford** (1–0) | Domínguez (0–1) | **Megill** (1) | 32,737 | 3–0 | W3 |
| 4 | March 30 | Rays | 2–3 | Cleavinger (1–0) | **Megill** (0–1) | Kelly (1) | 20,022 | 3–1 | L1 |
| 5 | March 31 | Rays | 6–2 | **Woodruff** (1–0) | McClanahan (0–1) | — | 20,010 | 4–1 | W1 |
| 6 | April 1 | Rays | 8–2 | **Ashby** (2–0) | Jax (0–2) | — | 21,949 | 5–1 | W2 |
| - | April 3 | @ Royals | **Postponed (rain)** (Makeup date: April 4) | | | | | | |
| 7 | April 4 (1) | @ Royals | 5–2 | **Patrick** (1–0) | Avila (0–1) | **Megill** (2) | 17,055 | 6–1 | W3 |
| 8 | April 4 (2) | @ Royals | 2–8 | Mears (1–0) | **Sproat** (0–1) | Morgan (1) | 12,732 | 6–2 | L1 |
| 9 | April 5 | @ Royals | 8–5 | **Harrison** (1–0) | Bubic (1–1) | **Megill** (3) | 14,584 | 7–2 | W1 |
| 10 | April 6 | @ Red Sox | 8–6 | **Ashby** (3–0) | Whitlock (0–1) | **Zerpa** (1) | 35,107 | 8–2 | W2 |
| 11 | April 7 | @ Red Sox | 2–3 | Crochet (2–1) | **Misiorowski** (1–1) | Chapman (3) | 33,193 | 8–3 | L1 |
| 12 | April 8 | @ Red Sox | 0–5 | Gray (2–0) | **Drohan** (0–1) | — | 28,660 | 8–4 | L2 |
| 13 | April 10 | Nationals | 3–7 | Poulin (1–0) | **Megill** (0–2) | — | 30,196 | 8–5 | L3 |
| 14 | April 11 | Nationals | 1–3 | Griffin (2–0) | **Harrison** (1–1) | Beeter (2) | 36,442 | 8–6 | L4 |
| 15 | April 12 | Nationals | 6–8 | Poulin (2–0) | **Zerpa** (0–1) | Varland (1) | 26,924 | 8–7 | L5 |
| 16 | April 14 | Blue Jays | 7–9 (10) | Varland (1–1) | **Anderson** (0–1) | — | 25,143 | 8–8 | L6 |
| 17 | April 15 | Blue Jays | 2–1 | **Ashby** (4–0) | Rogers (1–1) | **Uribe** (1) | 23,092 | 9–8 | W1 |
| 18 | April 16 | Blue Jays | 2–1 | **Ashby** (5–0) | Nance (0–1) | **Zerpa** (2) | 23,098 | 10–8 | W2 |
| 19 | April 17 | @ Marlins | 7–5 (10) | **Uribe** (1–0) | Faucher (1–2) | **Megill** (4) | 11,103 | 11–8 | W3 |
| 20 | April 18 | @ Marlins | 5–2 | **Woodruff** (2–0) | Alcántara (2–2) | **Uribe** (2) | 15,446 | 12–8 | W4 |
| 21 | April 19 | @ Marlins | 3–5 | Pérez (2–1) | **Misiorowski** (1–2) | Fairbanks (3) | 24,553 | 12–9 | L1 |
| 22 | April 21 | @ Tigers | 12–4 | **Anderson** (1–1) | Montero (1–2) | — | 20,847 | 13–9 | W1 |
| 23 | April 22 | @ Tigers | 2–5 | Mize (2–1) | **Patrick** (1–1) | Jansen (6) | 20,378 | 13–10 | L1 |
| 24 | April 23 | @ Tigers | 4–5 | Hurter (2–0) | **Uribe** (1–1) | — | 25,224 | 13–11 | L2 |
| 25 | April 24 | Pirates | 0–6 | Skenes (4–1) | **Woodruff** (2–1) | — | 33,339 | 13–12 | L3 |
| 26 | April 25 | Pirates | 3–6 (10) | Soto (2–0) | **Zerpa** (0–2) | Ramírez (1) | 40,408 | 13–13 | L4 |
| 27 | April 26 | Pirates | 5–0 | **Harrison** (2–1) | Mlodzinski (1–2) | — | 31,500 | 14–13 | W1 |
| 28 | April 28 | Diamondbacks | 13–2 | **Patrick** (2–1) | Kelly (1–2) | **Woodford** (1) | 23,062 | 15–13 | W2 |
| 29 | April 29 | Diamondbacks | 2–6 | Ginkel (1–1) | **Sproat** (0–2) | — | 24,540 | 15–14 | L1 |
| 30 | April 30 | Diamondbacks | 13–1 | **Drohan** (1–1) | Soroka (4–1) | — | 26,849 | 16–14 | W1 |

May: 19–7 (Home: 9–3; Road: 10–4)

| # | Date | Opponent | Score | Win | Loss | Save | Attendance | Record | Box/ Streak |
|---|---|---|---|---|---|---|---|---|---|
| 31 | May 1 | @ Nationals | 6–1 | **Misiorowski** (2–2) | Irvin (1–4) | — | 19,764 | 17–14 | W2 |
| 32 | May 2 | @ Nationals | 4–1 | **Harrison** (3–1) | Griffin (3–1) | **Uribe** (3) | 25,287 | 18–14 | W3 |
| 33 | May 3 | @ Nationals | 2–3 | Littell (1–4) | **Henderson** (0–1) | Lovelady (1) | 17,220 | 18–15 | L1 |
| 34 | May 4 | @ Cardinals | 3–6 | Leahy (4–3) | **Patrick** (2–2) | O'Brien (10) | 22,080 | 18–16 | L2 |
| ― | May 5 | @ Cardinals | **Postponed (rain)** (Makeup date: July 7) | | | | | | |
| 35 | May 6 | @ Cardinals | 6–2 | **Ashby** (6–0) | Pallante (3–3) | — | 25,772 | 19–16 | W1 |
| 36 | May 8 | Yankees | 6–0 | **Misiorowski** (3–2) | Fried (4–2) | **Drohan** (1) | 38,051 | 20–16 | W2 |
| 37 | May 9 | Yankees | 4–3 (10) | **Ashby** (7–0) | Cruz (3–1) | — | 35,628 | 21–16 | W3 |
| 38 | May 10 | Yankees | 4–3 | **Uribe** (2–1) | Bednar (1–3) | — | 40,175 | 22–16 | W4 |
| 39 | May 12 | Padres | 6–4 | **Sproat** (1–2) | Waldron (1–2) | **Uribe** (4) | 25,372 | 23–16 | W5 |
| 40 | May 13 | Padres | 1–3 | Adam (2–0) | **Uribe** (2–2) | Miller (13) | 28,683 | 23–17 | L1 |
| 41 | May 14 | Padres | 7–1 | **Harrison** (4–1) | Canning (0–2) | — | 34,862 | 24–17 | W1 |
| 42 | May 15 | @ Twins | 3–2 | **Ashby** (8–0) | Morris (1–2) | **Megill** (5) | 24,309 | 25–17 | W2 |
| 43 | May 16 | @ Twins | 2–1 | **Henderson** (1–1) | Prielipp (1–2) | **Patrick** (1) | 33,115 | 26–17 | W3 |
| 44 | May 17 | @ Twins | 4–5 | Ober (5–2) | **Anderson** (1–2) | García (2) | 25,375 | 26–18 | L1 |
| 45 | May 18 | @ Cubs | 9–3 | **Drohan** (2–1) | Imanaga (4–4) | — | 37,647 | 27–18 | W1 |
| 46 | May 19 | @ Cubs | 5–2 | **Misiorowski** (4–2) | Brown (1–2) | **Uribe** (5) | 38,190 | 28–18 | W2 |
| 47 | May 20 | @ Cubs | 5–0 | **Harrison** (5–1) | Cabrera (3–2) | — | 39,459 | 29–18 | W3 |
| 48 | May 22 | Dodgers | 5–1 | **Henderson** (2–1) | Wrobleski (6–2) | **Patrick** (2) | 36,446 | 30–18 | W4 |
| 49 | May 23 | Dodgers | 3–11 | Sasaki (3–3) | **Gasser** (0–1) | — | 38,136 | 30–19 | L1 |
| 50 | May 24 | Dodgers | 1–5 | Yamamoto (4–4) | **Sproat** (1–3) | — | 40,973 | 30–20 | L2 |
| 51 | May 25 | Cardinals | 5–1 | **Misiorowski** (5–2) | Liberatore (2–3) | — | 35,695 | 31–20 | W1 |
| 52 | May 26 | Cardinals | 6–0 | **Harrison** (6–1) | McGreevy (3–4) | — | 33,532 | 32–20 | W2 |
| 53 | May 27 | Cardinals | 2–1 | **Ashby** (9–0) | May (3–6) | **Megill** (6) | 30,391 | 33–20 | W3 |
| 54 | May 29 | @ Astros | 5–4 (10) | **Uribe** (3–2) | Santa (0–1) | **Megill** (7) | 29,978 | 34–20 | W4 |
| 55 | May 30 | @ Astros | 2–9 | Lambert (4–4) | **Sproat** (1–4) | — | 32,115 | 34–21 | L1 |
| 56 | May 31 | @ Astros | 2–0 | **Misiorowski** (6–2) | Imai (2–3) | **Megill** (8) | 28,366 | 35–21 | W1 |

June: 17–10 (Home: 9–6; Road: 8–4)

| # | Date | Opponent | Score | Win | Loss | Save | Attendance | Record | Box/ Streak |
|---|---|---|---|---|---|---|---|---|---|
| 57 | June 1 | Giants | 16–2 | **Patrick** (3–2) | Roupp (5–6) | — | 28,154 | 36–21 | W2 |
| 58 | June 2 | Giants | 8–3 | **Harrison** (7–1) | McDonald (2–3) | — | 29,728 | 37–21 | W3 |
| 59 | June 3 | Giants | 0–1 | Webb (3–4) | **Gasser** (0–2) | Winn (1) | 31,924 | 37–22 | L1 |
| 60 | June 4 | Giants | 9–12 | Hentges (1–0) | **Crow** (0–1) | Kilian (4) | 32,570 | 37–23 | L2 |
| 61 | June 5 | @ Rockies | 9–7 (10) | **Megill** (1–2) | Mejía (1–5) | — | 31,349 | 38–23 | W1 |
| 62 | June 6 | @ Rockies | 7–1 | **Misiorowski** (7–2) | Agnos (0–1) | — | 30,320 | 39–23 | W2 |
| 63 | June 7 | @ Rockies | 12–4 | **Drohan** (3–1) | Hill (0–2) | — | 32,270 | 40–23 | W3 |
| 64 | June 8 | @ Athletics | 15–14 (12) | **Uribe** (4–2) | Suárez (0–2) | **Patrick** (3) | 8,519 | 41–23 | W4 |
| 65 | June 9 | @ Athletics | 5–7 | Ginn (4–3) | **Gasser** (0–3) | Barnett (1) | 8,422 | 41–24 | L1 |
| 66 | June 10 | @ Athletics | 3–4 | Barlow (2–0) | **Patrick** (3–3) | Alvarado (1) | 8,436 | 41–25 | L2 |
| 67 | June 12 | Phillies | 6–0 | **Misiorowski** (8–2) | Banks (0–4) | — | 40,205 | 42–25 | W1 |
| 68 | June 13 | Phillies | 8–9 | Mayza (2–1) | **Drohan** (3–2) | Durán (18) | 40,157 | 42–26 | L1 |
| 69 | June 14 | Phillies | 4–0 | **Harrison** (8–1) | Sánchez (8–3) | — | 40,131 | 43–26 | W1 |
| 70 | June 16 | Guardians | 2–1 | **Ashby** (10–0) | Gaddis (1–2) | **Megill** (9) | 30,025 | 44–26 | W2 |
| 71 | June 17 | Guardians | 9–4 | **Patrick** (4–3) | Williams (9–4) | — | 30,452 | 45–26 | W3 |
| 72 | June 18 | Guardians | 2–4 | Messick (7–3) | **Anderson** (1–3) | Smith (24) | 36,386 | 45–27 | L1 |
| 73 | June 19 | @ Braves | 2–3 | Pérez (6–3) | **Misiorowski** (8–3) | Iglesias (15) | 40,107 | 45–28 | L2 |
| 74 | June 20 | @ Braves | 3–4 | Lee (3–0) | **Ashby** (10–1) | — | 40,156 | 45–29 | L3 |
| 75 | June 21 | @ Braves | 9–4 | **Gasser** (1–3) | Elder (5–5) | **Patrick** (4) | 39,344 | 46–29 | W1 |
| 76 | June 22 | @ Reds | 2–1 (10) | **Megill** (2–2) | Santillan (1–4) | **Kuhnel** (5) | 17,971 | 47–29 | W2 |
| 77 | June 23 | @ Reds | 2–0 | **Sproat** (2–4) | Garcia (0–1) | **Megill** (10) | 28,302 | 48–29 | W3 |
| 78 | June 24 | @ Reds | 6–5 | **Patrick** (5–3) | Lowder (3–5) | **Kuhnel** (6) | 22,981 | 49–29 | W4 |
| 79 | June 26 | Cubs | 6–2 | **Misiorowski** (9–3) | Roberts (0–2) | — | 41,021 | 50–29 | W5 |
| 80 | June 27 | Cubs | 2–8 | Peterson (4–6) | **Patrick** (5–4) | — | 40,193 | 50–30 | L1 |
| 81 | June 28 | Cubs | 3–4 (10) | Webb (3–2) | **Kuhnel** (1–3) | Wicks (1) | 42,056 | 50–31 | L2 |
| 82 | June 29 | Reds | 5–3 | **Ashby** (11–1) | Moll (1–6) | **Megill** (11) | 28,059 | 51–31 | W1 |
| 83 | June 30 | Reds | 7–2 | **Sproat** (3–4) | Lowder (3–6) | — | 28,081 | 52–31 | W2 |

July: 16–10 (Home: 8–3; Road: 8–7)

| # | Date | Opponent | Score | Win | Loss | Save | Attendance | Record | Box/ Streak |
|---|---|---|---|---|---|---|---|---|---|
| 84 | July 1 | Reds | 4–2 | **Ashby** (12–1) | Burke (3–4) | **Megill** (12) | 30,068 | 53–31 | W3 |
| 85 | July 2 | Reds | 2–7 | Burns (10–1) | **Misiorowski** (9–4) | — | 41,390 | 53–32 | L1 |
| 86 | July 3 | @ Diamondbacks | 7–4 (11) | **Anderson** (2–3) | Thompson (3–2) | — | 31,280 | 54–32 | W1 |
| 87 | July 4 | @ Diamondbacks | 3–4 | Kelly (6–8) | **Woodruff** (2–2) | Sewald (20) | 33,154 | 54–33 | L1 |
| 88 | July 5 | @ Diamondbacks | 3–2 | **Rom** (1–0) | Rodriguez (7–3) | **Megill** (13) | 24,728 | 55–33 | W1 |
| 89 | July 6 | @ Cardinals | 4–3 | **Drohan** (4–2) | Fernandez (1–2) | **Megill** (14) | 21,786 | 56–33 | W2 |
| 90 | July 7 (1) | @ Cardinals | 4–3 | **Misiorowski** (10–4) | Stanek (2–2) | **Uribe** (6) | 24,430 | 57–33 | W3 |
| 91 | July 7 (2) | @ Cardinals | 10–2 | **Gasser** (2–3) | Dobbins (1–1) | — | 20,399 | 58–33 | W4 |
| 92 | July 8 | @ Cardinals | 1–5 | McGreevy (4–7) | **Harrison** (8–2) | — | 20,395 | 58–34 | L1 |
| 93 | July 9 | @ Cardinals | 8–4 | **Henderson** (3–1) | Pallante (10–6) | — | 27,028 | 59–34 | W1 |
| ― | July 10 | @ Pirates | **Postponed (rain)** (Makeup date: July 11) | | | | | | |
| 94 | July 11 (1) | @ Pirates | 6–7 | Mlodzinski (6–3) | **Ashby** (12–2) | Soto (12) | 22,484 | 59–35 | L1 |
| 95 | July 11 (2) | @ Pirates | 2–3 | Ramírez (6–2) | **Drohan** (4–3) | Montgomery (1) | 29,080 | 59–36 | L2 |
| 96 | July 12 | @ Pirates | 5–14 | Skenes (8–8) | **Gasser** (2–4) | ― | 34,087 | 59–37 | L3 |
| ASG | July 14 | AL @ NL | 4–0 | Cease (1–0) | Sánchez (0–1) | ― | 43,916 | — | ― |
| 97 | July 17 | Marlins | 2–1 (10) | **Yoho** (1–0) | Bachar (1–1) | — | 38,566 | 60–37 | W1 |
| 98 | July 18 | Marlins | 8–6 | **Drohan** (5–3) | Faucher (4–5) | **Megill** (15) | 40,144 | 61–37 | W2 |
| 99 | July 19 | Marlins | 3–1 | **Anderson** (3–3) | Fairbanks (3–4) | — | 36,451 | 62–37 | W3 |
| 100 | July 20 | Mets | 8–3 | **Yoho** (2–0) | Peralta (5–9) | — | 34,073 | 63–37 | W4 |
| 101 | July 21 | Mets | 0–4 | Thornton (1–1) | **Sproat** (3–5) | — | 30,016 | 63–38 | L1 |
| 102 | July 22 | Mets | 4–3 | **Henderson** (4–1) | Scott (3–2) | **Megill** (16) | 38,319 | 64–38 | W1 |
| 103 | July 24 | Rockies | 2–5 | Sugano (10–4) | **Drohan** (5–4) | Romano (8) | 37,089 | 64–39 | L1 |
| 104 | July 25 | Rockies | 8–5 | **Gasser** (3–4) | Feltner (3–5) | **Megill** (17) | 34,328 | 65–39 | W1 |
| 105 | July 26 | Rockies | 11–2 | **Misiorowski** (11–4) | Freeland (2–10) | — | 39,131 | 66–39 | W2 |
| 106 | July 27 | @ Giants | 0–3 | Mahle (3–9) | **Sproat** (3–6) | Miller (3) | 35,107 | 66–40 | L1 |
| 107 | July 28 | @ Giants | 8–2 | **Henderson** (5–1) | Roupp (7–9) | — | 38,021 | 67–40 | W1 |
| 108 | July 29 | @ Giants | 3–16 | Webb (6–7) | **Pannone** (0–1) | — | 35,399 | 67–41 | L1 |
| 109 | July 31 | @ Angels | 6–2 | **Drohan** (6–4) | Johnson (2–6) | — | 43,720 | 68–41 | W1 |

August: 17–12 (Home: 11–5; Road: 6–7)

| # | Date | Opponent | Score | Win | Loss | Save | Attendance | Record | Box/ Streak |
|---|---|---|---|---|---|---|---|---|---|
| 110 | August 1 | @ Angels | 3–1 | **Patrick** (6–4) | Natera Jr. (1–1) | **Megill** (18) | 31,124 | 69–41 | W2 |
| 111 | August 2 | @ Angels | 0–3 | Ureña (7–7) | **Misiorowski** (11–5) | Zeferjahn (4) | 31,061 | 69–42 | L1 |
| 112 | August 3 | Pirates | 3–4 | Chandler (4–8) | **Sproat** (3–7) | Montgomery (3) | 30,684 | 69–43 | L2 |
| 113 | August 4 | Pirates | 4–2 | **Henderson** (6–1) | Jones (2–3) | **Megill** (19) | 30,014 | 70–43 | W1 |
| 114 | August 5 | Pirates | 4–2 | **Harrison** (9–2) | Skenes (9–10) | **Megill** (20) | 33,528 | 71–43 | W2 |
| 115 | August 6 | Pirates | 5–2 | **May** (6–7) | Ashcraft (11–5) | **Patrick** (5) | 38,145 | 72–43 | W3 |
| 116 | August 7 | Twins | 6–8 | Matthews (5–8) | **Senzatela** (9–3) | Gómez (16) | 42,118 | 72–44 | L1 |
| 117 | August 8 | Twins | 4–3 | **Ashby** (13–2) | Hoffman (6–8) | **Megill** (21) | 40,625 | 73–44 | W1 |
| 118 | August 9 | Twins | 4–3 (10) | **Hall** (1–0) | Gómez (2–2) | — | 42,731 | 74–44 | W2 |
| 119 | August 10 | @ Padres | 2–3 | Matsui (3–1) | **Henderson** (6–2) | Miller (30) | 40,323 | 74–45 | L1 |
| 120 | August 11 | @ Padres | 2–11 | Buehler (7–5) | **Harrison** (9–3) | — | 40,534 | 74–46 | L2 |
| 121 | August 12 | @ Padres | 3–4 (11) | Morejón (9–2) | **Senzatela** (9–4) | — | 36,072 | 74–47 | L3 |
| 122 | August 13 | @ Dodgers | 5–4 | **Hall** (2–0) | Díaz (2–2) | **Megill** (22) | 46,105 | 75–47 | W1 |
| 123 | August 14 | @ Dodgers | 1–3 | Yamamoto (12–7) | **Gasser** (3–5) | Díaz (7) | 47,066 | 75–48 | L1 |
| 124 | August 15 | @ Dodgers | 4–1 | **Misiorowski** (12–5) | Wrobleski (11–5) | **Ashby** (1) | 47,767 | 76–48 | W1 |
| 125 | August 16 | @ Dodgers | 6–2 | **Henderson** (7–2) | Skubal (7–7) | — | 45,828 | 77–48 | W2 |
| 126 | August 18 | Mariners | 22–0 | **Harrison** (10–3) | Miller (4–7) | ― | 36,870 | 78–48 | W3 |
| 127 | August 19 | Mariners | 5–7 | Gilbert (10–7) | **May** (6–8) | Muñoz (23) | 34,564 | 78–49 | L1 |
| 128 | August 20 | Mariners | 7–4 | **Patrick** (7–4) | Kirby (8–10) | **Megill** (23) | 35,909 | 79–49 | W1 |
| 129 | August 21 | Braves | 2–1 | **Misiorowski** (13–5) | Sale (12–9) | **Megill** (24) | 40,130 | 80–49 | W2 |
| 130 | August 22 | Braves | 4–1 | **Henderson** (8–2) | Pérez (8–8) | **Ashby** (2) | 42,298 | 81–49 | W3 |
| 131 | August 23 | Braves* | 2–4 | Mahle (5–10) | **Drohan** (6–5) | Iglesias (27) | 2,432 | 81–50 | L1 |
| 132 | August 25 | @ Mets | 2–3 (10) | Pintaro (2–0) | **Megill** (2–3) | — | 28,942 | 81–51 | L2 |
| 133 | August 26 | @ Mets | 8–1 | **Gasser** (4–5) | Stock (0–3) | ― | 23,607 | 82–51 | W1 |
| 134 | August 27 | @ Mets | 8–2 | **Misiorowski** (14–5) | Manaea (4–6) | ― | 26,611 | 83–51 | W2 |
| 135 | August 28 | Rangers | 6–1 | **Henderson** (9–2) | Bradford (0–3) | — | 41,620 | 84–51 | W3 |
| 136 | August 29 | Rangers | 5–3 | **Drohan** (7–5) | Quantrill (6–5) | **Megill** (25) | 36,895 | 85–51 | W4 |
| 137 | August 30 | Rangers | 4–7 | Alexander (5–2) | **May** (6–9) | Latz (27) | 37,996 | 85–52 | L1 |
| 138 | August 31 | @ Cubs | 3–17 | Holmes (6–6) | **Harrison** (10–4) | — | 34,763 | 85–53 | L2 |
*August 23 game played at Bowman Field in Williamsport, Pennsylvania

September: 18–6 (Home: 8–1; Road: 10–6)

| # | Date | Opponent | Score | Win | Loss | Save | Attendance | Record | Box/ Streak |
|---|---|---|---|---|---|---|---|---|---|
| 139 | September 1 | @ Cubs | 9–4 | **Senzatela** (10–4) | Palencia (2–2) | — | 33,185 | 86–53 | W1 |
| 140 | September 2 | @ Cubs | 9–5 | **Romero** (2–3) | Peterson (7–8) | — | 36,112 | 87–53 | W2 |
| 141 | September 3 | @ Cubs | 1–2 | Gausman (9–11) | **Henderson** (9–3) | Rolison (2) | 39,018 | 87–54 | L1 |
| 142 | September 4 | @ Reds | 10–7 | **Patrick** (8–4) | Lowder (6–9) | **Megill** (26) | 30,450 | 88–54 | W1 |
| 143 | September 5 | @ Reds | 3–5 | Santillan (8–4) | **Ashby** (13–3) | Pagán (21) | 32,778 | 88–55 | L1 |
| 144 | September 6 | @ Reds | 8–12 | Singer (6–13) | **Senzatela** (10–5) | Pagán (22) | 23,310 | 88–56 | L2 |
| 145 | September 7 | Cubs | 4–3 | **Uribe** (5–2) | Boyd (8–4) | **Megill** (27) | 42,368 | 89–56 | W1 |
| 146 | September 8 | Cubs | 4–3 (10) | **Hall** (3–0) | Thielbar (3–3) | — | 36,076 | 90–56 | W2 |
| 147 | September 9 | Cubs | 8–6 | **Henderson** (10–3) | Gausman (9–12) | — | 36,073 | 91–56 | W3 |
| 148 | September 11 | Reds | 20–0 | **May** (7–9) | Abbott (6–11) | **Stallings** (1) | 41,879 | 92–56 | W4 |
| 149 | September 12 | Reds | 13–9 | **Patrick** (9–4) | Singer (6–14) | — | 41,167 | 93–56 | W5 |
| 150 | September 13 | Reds | 3–4 | Williamson (4–4) | **Uribe** (5–3) | Pagán (23) | 40,559 | 93–57 | L1 |
| 151 | September 15 | @ Pirates | 5–1 | **Misiorowski** (15–5) | Bachar (1–4) | — | 23,961 | 94–57 | W1 |
| 152 | September 16 | @ Pirates | 5–4 | **Senzatela** (11–5) | Mlodzinski (7–7) | **Megill** (28) | 11,393 | 95–57 | W2 |
| 153 | September 17 | @ Pirates | 4–7 | Curtis (2–0) | **Harrison** (10–5) | Montgomery (14) | 10,818 | 95–58 | L1 |
| 154 | September 18 | @ Orioles | 6–5 (10) | **Megill** (3–3) | Wolfram (6–4) | **Patrick** (6) | 25,304 | 96–58 | W1 |
| 155 | September 19 | @ Orioles | 1–0 | **Gasser** (5–5) | Rogers (10–11) | **Ashby** (3) | 32,663 | 97–58 | W2 |
| 156 | September 20 | @ Orioles | 3–0 | **Hall** (4–0) | Young (9–5) | **Megill** (29) | 15,337 | 98–58 | W3 |
| 157 | September 22 | @ Phillies | 4–6 | Alvarado (5–3) | **Gordon** (0–1) | Durán (33) | 37,132 | 98–59 | L1 |
| 158 | September 23 | @ Phillies | 4–1 | **Henderson** (11–3) | Nola (7–11) | **Megill** (30) | 37,271 | 99–59 | W1 |
| 159 | September 24 | @ Phillies | 5–1 | **Romero** (3–3) | Alvarado (5–4) | **Senzatela** (4) | 37,177 | 100–59 | W2 |
| 160 | September 25 | Cardinals | 8–4 | **Uribe** (6–3) | Gastélum (5–4) | — | 42,793 | 101–59 | W3 |
| 161 | September 26 | Cardinals | 3–2 | **Harrison** (11–5) | Mathews (2–4) | **Ashby** (4) | 42,900 | 102–59 | W4 |
| 162 | September 27 | Cardinals | 6–4 | **Misiorowski** (16–5) | Pallante (12–9) | **Drohan** (2) | 43,556 | 103–59 | W5 |

== Postseason ==
=== Game log ===
2026 Postseason game log: 11–2 (Home: 6–0; Away: 5–2)
NL Division Series: 3–1 (Home: 2–0; Away: 1–1)

| # | Date | Opponent | Score | Win | Loss | Save | Attendance | Record | Box/ Streak |
|---|---|---|---|---|---|---|---|---|---|
| 1 | October 3 | Padres | 3–2 | Hall (1–0) | Morejón (0–1) | Megill (1) | 42,843 | 1–0 | W1 |
| 2 | October 4 | Padres | 4–3 | Megill (1–0) | Miller (0–1) | — | 41,683 | 2–0 | W2 |
| 3 | October 6 | @ Padres | 3–4 | Matsui (1–0) | Romero (0–1) | King (1) | 47,708 | 2–1 | L1 |
| 4 | October 7 | @ Padres | 3–1 | Ashby (1–0) | Ray (0–1) | Megill (2) | 47,712 | 3–1 | W1 |

NL Championship Series: 4–0 (Home: 2–0; Away: 2–0)

| # | Date | Opponent | Score | Win | Loss | Save | Attendance | Record | Box/ Streak |
|---|---|---|---|---|---|---|---|---|---|
| 1 | October 11 | Dodgers | 2–1 | Hall (2–0) | Skubal (1–1) | Megill (3) | 42,617 | 1–0 | W2 |
| 2 | October 12 | Dodgers | 7–4 | Romero (1–1) | Stewart (0–1) | Ashby (1) | 42,516 | 2–0 | W3 |
| 3 | October 14 | @ Dodgers | 6–2 | Hall (3–0) | Snell (0–1) | Megill (4) | 50,708 | 3–0 | W4 |
| 4 | October 15 | @ Dodgers | 6–4 | Romero (2–1) | Scott (0–1) | Ashby (2) | 49,104 | 4–0 | W5 |

World Series: 4–1 (Home: 2–0; Away: 2–1)

| # | Date | Opponent | Score | Win | Loss | Save | Attendance | Record | Box/ Streak |
|---|---|---|---|---|---|---|---|---|---|
| 1 | October 23 | Rays | 3–2 | Misiorowski (1–0) | Martinez (1–1) | Megill (5) | 43,250 | 1–0 | W6 |
| 2 | October 24 | Rays | 5–4 | Uribe (1–0) | Wells (0–2) | Ashby (3) | 43,245 | 2–0 | W7 |
| 3 | October 26 | @ Rays | 10–1 | Gasser (1–0) | Peralta (2–1) | – | 40,388 | 3–0 | W8 |
| 4 | October 27 | @ Rays | 3–4 (12) | Seymour (2–0) | Drohan (0–1) | – | 40,514 | 3–1 | L1 |
| 5 | October 28 | @ Rays | 4–1 | Misiorowski (2–0) | Rasmussen (2–1) | – | 40,489 | 4–1 | W1 |

=== Postseason rosters ===
Playoff rosters
National League Division Series

- Pitchers: 21 Dustin May 26 Aaron Ashby 29 Trevor Megill 32 Jacob Misiorowski 33 JoJo Romero 37 DL Hall 39 Chad Patrick 43 Logan Henderson 45 Abner Uribe 49 Antonio Senzatela 52 Kyle Harrison 54 Robert Gasser 55 Shane Drohan
- Catchers: 24 William Contreras 99 Gary Sánchez
- Infielders: 2 Brice Turang 3 Joey Ortiz 6 David Hamilton 9 Jake Bauers 12 Cooper Pratt 28 Andrew Vaughn
- Outfielders: 5 Garrett Mitchell 10 Sal Frelick 11 Jackson Chourio 18 Luis Lara 22 Christian Yelich

National League Championship Series

- Pitchers: 21 Dustin May 26 Aaron Ashby 29 Trevor Megill 32 Jacob Misiorowski 33 JoJo Romero 37 DL Hall 39 Chad Patrick 43 Logan Henderson 45 Abner Uribe 49 Antonio Senzatela 52 Kyle Harrison 54 Robert Gasser 55 Shane Drohan
- Catchers: 24 William Contreras 99 Gary Sánchez
- Infielders: 2 Brice Turang 3 Joey Ortiz 6 David Hamilton 9 Jake Bauers 12 Cooper Pratt 28 Andrew Vaughn
- Outfielders: 5 Garrett Mitchell 10 Sal Frelick 11 Jackson Chourio 18 Luis Lara 22 Christian Yelich

World Series

- Pitchers: 21 Dustin May 26 Aaron Ashby 29 Trevor Megill 32 Jacob Misiorowski 33 JoJo Romero 37 DL Hall 43 Logan Henderson 45 Abner Uribe 49 Antonio Senzatela 52 Kyle Harrison 53 Brandon Woodruff 54 Robert Gasser 55 Shane Drohan
- Catchers: 24 William Contreras 99 Gary Sánchez
- Infielders: 2 Brice Turang 3 Joey Ortiz 6 David Hamilton 9 Jake Bauers 12 Cooper Pratt 28 Andrew Vaughn
- Outfielders: 5 Garrett Mitchell 10 Sal Frelick 11 Jackson Chourio 18 Luis Lara 22 Christian Yelich

== Roster ==
2026 Milwaukee Brewers
Roster
| Pitchers: 56 Grant Anderson; 26 Aaron Ashby; 57 Coleman Crow; 55 Shane Drohan; 35 Brian Fitzpatrick; 54 Robert Gasser; 36 Colton Gordon; 37 DL Hall; 52 Kyle Harrison; 43 Logan Henderson; 47 Jared Koenig; 59 Joel Kuhnel; 21 Dustin May; 50 Lance McCullers Jr.; 50 Easton McGee; 29 Trevor Megill; 32 Jacob Misiorowski; 33 Thomas Pannone; 39 Chad Patrick; 48 Lyon Richardson; 27 Carlos Rodríguez; 38 Drew Rom; 33 JoJo Romero; 49 Antonio Senzatela; 23 Brandon Sproat; 31 Garrett Stallings; 45 Abner Uribe; 41 Bryse Wilson; 41 Jake Woodford; 53 Brandon Woodruff; 48 Craig Yoho; 61 Ángel Zerpa | Catchers: 24 William Contreras; 14 Bo Naylor; 15 Jeferson Quero; 99 Gary Sánchez; Infielders: 0 Ji-hwan Bae; 9 Jake Bauers; 6 David Hamilton; 13 Jonathan Ornelas; 3 Joey Ortiz; 12 Cooper Pratt; 13 Luis Rengifo; 13 Braden Shewmake; 2 Brice Turang; 28 Andrew Vaughn | Outfielders: 7 Tyler Black; 11 Jackson Chourio; 10 Sal Frelick; 14 Greg Jones; 18 Luis Lara; 20 Brandon Lockridge; 21 Luis Matos; 5 Garrett Mitchell; 16 Blake Perkins; 22 Christian Yelich | Manager: 49,00 Pat Murphy; Coaches: 67 Spencer Allen (first base); 97 Christian Correa (bullpen catcher); 98 Néstor Corredor (field coordinator); 95 Daniel de Mondesert (game preparation specialist); 94 Ty Duvall (bullpen catcher); 68 Matt Erickson (third base); 88 Charlie Greene (bullpen); 71 Jim Henderson (pitching coordinator); 84 Chris Hook (pitching); 40 Jason Lane (offense and strategy coordinator); 96 Evan Martin (game preparation specialist); 91 Guillermo Martínez (hitting); 93 Juan Sandoval (assistant pitching); 85 Eric Theisen (lead hitting); 92 Daniel Vogelbach (hitting) |

== Player stats ==
| = Indicates team leader |

| = Indicates league leader |

=== Batting ===
Note: G = Games played; AB = At bats; R = Runs scored; H = Hits; 2B = Doubles; 3B = Triples; HR = Home runs; RBI = Runs batted in; SB = Stolen bases; BB = Walks; AVG = Batting average; SLG = Slugging average

| Player | G | AB | R | H | 2B | 3B | HR | RBI | SB | BB | AVG | SLG |
|---|---|---|---|---|---|---|---|---|---|---|---|---|
| Brice Turang | 151 | 582 | 102 | 156 | 37 | 3 | 21 | 100 | 19 | 90 | .268 | .450 |
| William Contreras | 147 | 566 | 82 | 153 | 27 | 1 | 18 | 94 | 1 | 61 | .270 | .417 |
| Jackson Chourio | 127 | 522 | 96 | 152 | 27 | 0 | 25 | 75 | 23 | 47 | .291 | .487 |
| Jake Bauers | 144 | 477 | 93 | 127 | 22 | 2 | 26 | 86 | 11 | 94 | .266 | .484 |
| Garrett Mitchell | 145 | 461 | 74 | 121 | 30 | 4 | 11 | 65 | 14 | 60 | .262 | .416 |
| Christian Yelich | 118 | 442 | 69 | 104 | 23 | 2 | 12 | 59 | 11 | 49 | .235 | .378 |
| Joey Ortiz | 134 | 371 | 49 | 100 | 14 | 4 | 9 | 47 | 9 | 35 | .270 | .402 |
| Sal Frelick | 111 | 339 | 36 | 78 | 18 | 0 | 4 | 40 | 7 | 31 | .230 | .319 |
| David Hamilton | 121 | 339 | 49 | 83 | 13 | 3 | 4 | 26 | 30 | 32 | .245 | .336 |
| Andrew Vaughn | 104 | 288 | 33 | 88 | 18 | 2 | 6 | 43 | 0 | 35 | .306 | .444 |
| Cooper Pratt | 74 | 228 | 33 | 64 | 7 | 2 | 3 | 34 | 19 | 26 | .281 | .368 |
| Gary Sánchez | 86 | 225 | 37 | 47 | 10 | 1 | 12 | 38 | 0 | 46 | .209 | .422 |
| Luis Lara | 61 | 191 | 25 | 47 | 8 | 2 | 1 | 26 | 3 | 18 | .246 | .325 |
| Luis Rengifo | 57 | 185 | 19 | 38 | 9 | 0 | 0 | 19 | 3 | 19 | .205 | .254 |
| Brandon Lockridge | 39 | 101 | 13 | 28 | 5 | 0 | 0 | 12 | 6 | 11 | .277 | .327 |
| Blake Perkins | 55 | 89 | 14 | 14 | 6 | 0 | 1 | 11 | 3 | 10 | .157 | .258 |
| Tyler Black | 9 | 27 | 2 | 9 | 4 | 0 | 0 | 7 | 0 | 1 | .333 | .481 |
| Greg Jones | 12 | 23 | 0 | 2 | 0 | 0 | 0 | 1 | 1 | 0 | .087 | .087 |
| Luis Matos | 9 | 20 | 1 | 4 | 0 | 0 | 0 | 0 | 0 | 1 | .200 | .200 |
| Jonathan Ornelas | 3 | 9 | 1 | 2 | 0 | 0 | 0 | 1 | 0 | 0 | .222 | .222 |
| Braden Shewmake | 4 | 7 | 2 | 2 | 1 | 0 | 0 | 1 | 1 | 0 | .286 | .429 |
| Bo Naylor | 3 | 7 | 1 | 2 | 0 | 0 | 1 | 3 | 0 | 1 | .286 | .714 |
| Ji-hwan Bae | 4 | 2 | 1 | 1 | 0 | 0 | 0 | 0 | 1 | 0 | .500 | .500 |
| Jeferson Quero | 1 | 1 | 0 | 0 | 0 | 0 | 0 | 0 | 0 | 1 | .000 | .000 |
| Totals | 162 | 5502 | 832 | 1422 | 279 | 26 | 154 | 788 | 162 | 668 | .258 | .403 |

=== Pitching ===
Note: W = Wins; L = Losses; ERA = Earned run average; G = Games pitched; GS = Games started; SV = Saves; IP = Innings pitched; H = Hits allowed; R = Runs allowed; ER = Earned runs; BB = Walks allowed; SO = Strikeouts

| Player | W | L | ERA | G | GS | SV | IP | H | R | ER | BB | SO |
|---|---|---|---|---|---|---|---|---|---|---|---|---|
| Jacob Misiorowski | 16 | 5 | 1.80 | 30 | 30 | 0 | 174.2 | 96 | 43 | 35 | 44 | 252 |
| Shane Drohan | 7 | 5 | 4.19 | 33 | 19 | 2 | 124.2 | 121 | 63 | 58 | 44 | 125 |
| Kyle Harrison | 11 | 5 | 4.20 | 28 | 24 | 0 | 115.2 | 120 | 62 | 54 | 36 | 141 |
| Robert Gasser | 5 | 5 | 3.87 | 21 | 20 | 0 | 109.1 | 95 | 49 | 47 | 35 | 103 |
| Chad Patrick | 9 | 4 | 3.40 | 57 | 6 | 6 | 106.0 | 84 | 40 | 40 | 47 | 93 |
| Logan Henderson | 11 | 3 | 2.47 | 18 | 18 | 0 | 98.1 | 64 | 28 | 27 | 19 | 110 |
| Brandon Sproat | 3 | 7 | 5.57 | 22 | 19 | 0 | 97.0 | 88 | 61 | 60 | 52 | 101 |
| Aaron Ashby | 13 | 3 | 3.12 | 75 | 1 | 4 | 89.1 | 76 | 36 | 31 | 41 | 116 |
| Trevor Megill | 3 | 3 | 2.63 | 63 | 0 | 30 | 61.2 | 40 | 20 | 18 | 15 | 69 |
| DL Hall | 4 | 0 | 1.91 | 47 | 1 | 0 | 61.1 | 29 | 13 | 13 | 35 | 64 |
| Abner Uribe | 6 | 3 | 1.97 | 61 | 0 | 6 | 59.1 | 42 | 13 | 13 | 19 | 62 |
| Grant Anderson | 3 | 3 | 3.36 | 52 | 0 | 0 | 59.0 | 43 | 27 | 22 | 23 | 52 |
| Brandon Woodruff | 2 | 2 | 2.98 | 9 | 9 | 0 | 45.1 | 28 | 16 | 15 | 10 | 47 |
| Dustin May | 2 | 2 | 5.65 | 10 | 10 | 0 | 36.2 | 37 | 23 | 23 | 15 | 38 |
| Bryse Wilson | 0 | 0 | 3.51 | 13 | 0 | 0 | 25.2 | 31 | 10 | 10 | 1 | 23 |
| Jake Woodford | 1 | 0 | 6.94 | 16 | 0 | 1 | 23.1 | 34 | 18 | 18 | 7 | 20 |
| Antonio Senzatela | 2 | 3 | 5.14 | 23 | 0 | 1 | 21.0 | 22 | 13 | 12 | 9 | 14 |
| Craig Yoho | 2 | 0 | 3.15 | 15 | 0 | 0 | 20.0 | 9 | 7 | 7 | 8 | 18 |
| Coleman Crow | 0 | 1 | 5.30 | 5 | 4 | 0 | 18.2 | 21 | 13 | 11 | 6 | 10 |
| Garrett Stallings | 0 | 0 | 0.00 | 6 | 0 | 1 | 14.0 | 4 | 0 | 0 | 5 | 17 |
| JoJo Romero | 2 | 0 | 3.38 | 11 | 0 | 0 | 13.1 | 11 | 5 | 5 | 2 | 11 |
| Angel Zerpa | 0 | 2 | 6.39 | 12 | 0 | 2 | 12.2 | 16 | 11 | 9 | 6 | 8 |
| Joel Kuhnel | 0 | 1 | 6.52 | 10 | 0 | 2 | 9.2 | 13 | 9 | 7 | 6 | 8 |
| Carlos Rodríguez | 0 | 0 | 3.86 | 4 | 0 | 0 | 9.1 | 10 | 4 | 4 | 4 | 8 |
| Jared Koenig | 0 | 0 | 9.00 | 9 | 0 | 0 | 7.0 | 12 | 9 | 7 | 7 | 7 |
| Brian Fitzpatrick | 0 | 0 | 1.35 | 5 | 0 | 0 | 6.2 | 7 | 2 | 1 | 3 | 5 |
| Drew Rom | 1 | 0 | 3.18 | 5 | 0 | 0 | 5.2 | 6 | 2 | 2 | 4 | 11 |
| Colton Gordon | 0 | 1 | 3.60 | 1 | 0 | 0 | 5.0 | 4 | 3 | 2 | 1 | 1 |
| Lance McCullers Jr. | 0 | 0 | 3.86 | 2 | 0 | 0 | 4.2 | 3 | 5 | 2 | 5 | 5 |
| Andrew Vaughn | 0 | 0 | 30.00 | 2 | 0 | 0 | 3.0 | 12 | 10 | 10 | 5 | 1 |
| Thomas Pannone | 0 | 1 | 6.00 | 1 | 1 | 0 | 3.0 | 3 | 3 | 2 | 2 | 2 |
| Easton McGee | 0 | 0 | 0.00 | 2 | 0 | 0 | 2.0 | 1 | 0 | 0 | 1 | 1 |
| Gary Sánchez | 0 | 0 | 0.00 | 2 | 0 | 0 | 2.0 | 4 | 0 | 0 | 0 | 0 |
| Lyon Richardson | 0 | 0 | 0.00 | 1 | 0 | 0 | 1.2 | 0 | 0 | 0 | 1 | 1 |
| Totals | 103 | 59 | 3.51 | 162 | 162 | 55 | 1446.2 | 1186 | 618 | 565 | 518 | 1544 |

== Farm system ==
The Brewers' farm system consists of seven minor league affiliates in 2026.

| Level | Team | League | Manager |
|---|---|---|---|
| Triple-A | Nashville Sounds | International League | Rick Sweet |
| Double-A | Biloxi Shuckers | Southern League | Mike Guerrero |
| High-A | Wisconsin Timber Rattlers | Midwest League | Nick Stanley |
| Single-A | Wilson Warbirds | Carolina League | Eddy Morgan |
| Rookie | ACL Brewers | Arizona Complex League | Rafael Neda |
| Rookie | DSL Brewers Blue | Dominican Summer League | Victor Rey |
| Rookie | DSL Brewers Gold | Dominican Summer League | Natanael Mejia |
