= Craig Yoho =

American baseball player (born 1999)

Cleveland Guardians – No. 23
- Pitcher
- Born: October 23, 1999 (age 27); Fishers, Indiana, U.S.
- Bats: Right Throws: Right

MLB debut
- April 21, 2025, for the Milwaukee Brewers

MLB statistics (through 2026 season)
- Win–loss record: 2–1
- Earned run average: 5.36
- Strikeouts: 48
- Stats at Baseball Reference

Teams
- Milwaukee Brewers (2025–2026); Cleveland Guardians (2026–present)

Craig Nolan Yoho (born October 23, 1999) is an American professional baseball pitcher for the Cleveland Guardians of Major League Baseball (MLB). He made his MLB debut with the Milwaukee Brewers in 2025.

== Career ==
=== Amateur ===
Yoho attended Fishers High School in Fishers, Indiana. He started his college baseball career as an infielder at the University of Houston from 2019 to 2022 before transferring to Indiana University Bloomington in 2023, where he converted into a pitcher.

=== Milwaukee Brewers ===
Yoho originally intended to transfer to the University of Arkansas for the 2024 season, but signed with the Milwaukee Brewers after they selected him in the eighth round (242nd overall) of the 2023 Major League Baseball draft.

Yoho made his professional debut with the rookie-level Arizona Complex League Brewers. He started 2024 with the High-A Wisconsin Timber Rattlers before being promoted to the Double-A Biloxi Shuckers and Triple-A Nashville Sounds. In 48 appearances split between the three affiliates, Yoho compiled a combined 4–2 record and 0.94 ERA with 101 strikeouts and 10 saves across 57 2/3 innings pitched.

Yoho began the 2025 campaign with Triple-A Nashville, striking out nine in 9 2/3 scoreless innings. On April 21, 2025, Yoho was promoted to the major leagues for the first time. On May 3, he was optioned back to Nashville.

On July 17, 2026, Yoho recorded his first career win, tossing a scoreless 10th inning against the Miami Marlins.

=== Cleveland Guardians ===
On August 1, 2026, the Brewers traded Yoho and Blake Perkins to the Cleveland Guardians in exchange for Codi Heuer and Bo Naylor.
