= Joey Ortiz =

American baseball player (born 1998)

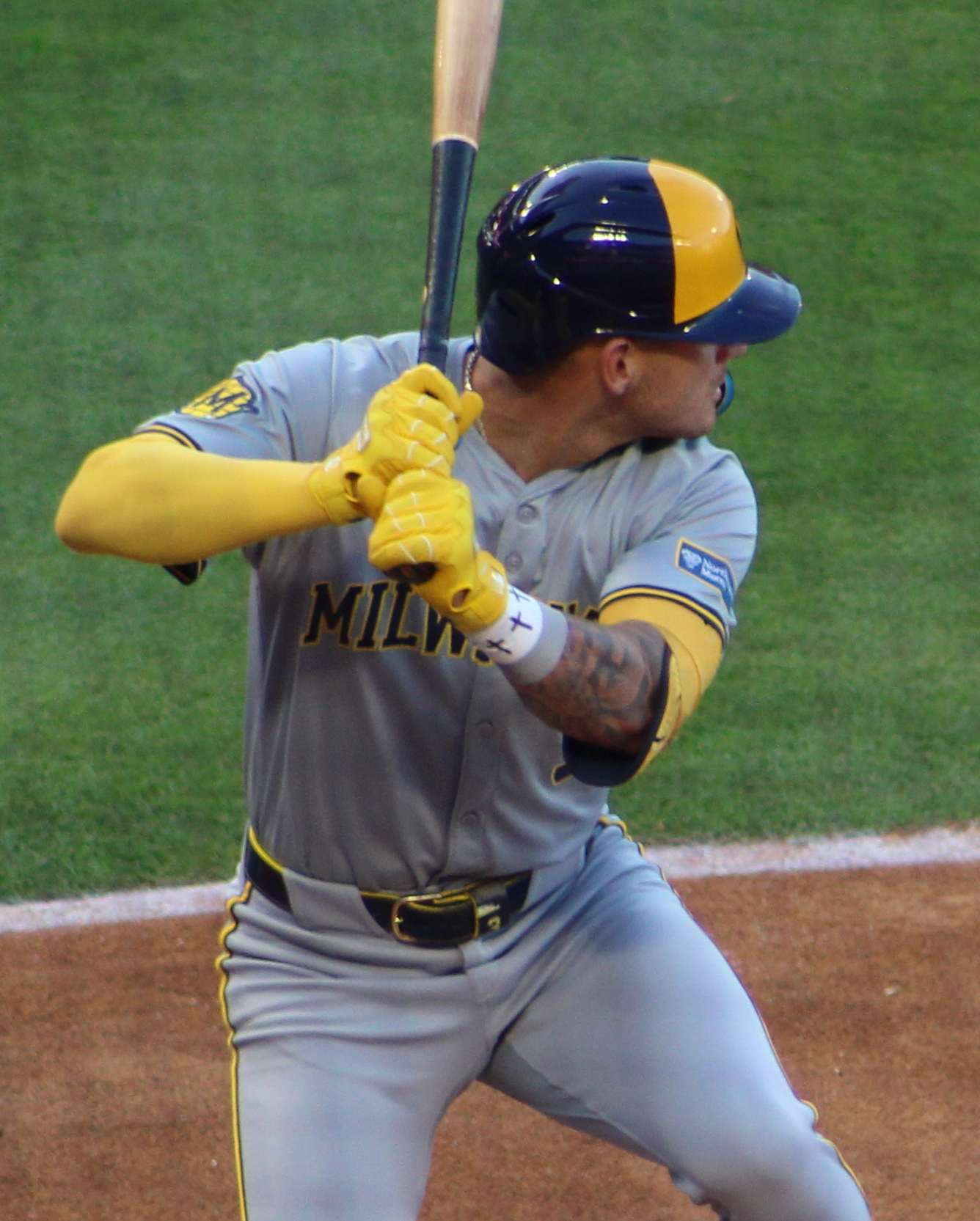
- Ortiz with the Milwaukee Brewers in 2024

Milwaukee Brewers – No. 3
- Third baseman / Shortstop
- Born: July 14, 1998 (age 28); Garden Grove, California, U.S.
- Bats: Right Throws: Right

MLB debut
- April 27, 2023, for the Baltimore Orioles

MLB statistics (through 2026 season)
- Batting average: .244
- Home runs: 27
- Runs batted in: 156
- Stats at Baseball Reference

Teams
- Baltimore Orioles (2023); Milwaukee Brewers (2024–present)

Career highlights and awards
- World Series champion (2026)

Joseph Anthony Ortiz (born July 14, 1998) is an American professional baseball third baseman and shortstop for the Milwaukee Brewers of Major League Baseball (MLB). He made his MLB debut in 2023 for the Baltimore Orioles.

== Amateur career ==
Ortiz attended Pacifica High School in Garden Grove, California, where he played baseball and hit .417 with six triples as a senior in 2016. He went unselected in the 2016 Major League Baseball draft and enrolled at New Mexico State University to play college baseball for the New Mexico State Aggies.

As a freshman at New Mexico State in 2017, Ortiz played in 55 games and hit .306 with 14 extra-base hits and 35 RBI. For the 2018 season, he played sixty games and batted .289 with seven home runs, 54 RBI, and 13 stolen bases. That summer, he played for the Willmar Stingers of the Northwoods League. As a junior in 2019, Ortiz played in 55 games and batted .422 with eight home runs, 84 RBI, 12 stolen bases, and 25 doubles and was one of five finalists for the Brooks Wallace Award.

== Professional career ==
=== Baltimore Orioles ===
The Baltimore Orioles selected Ortiz in the fourth round with the 108th overall selection in the 2019 Major League Baseball draft. Ortiz signed with the Orioles and made his professional debut with the Aberdeen IronBirds, batting .241 with one home run and 17 RBI over 56 games. He did not play a game in 2020 due to the cancellation of the minor league season because of the COVID-19 pandemic. Ortiz started the 2021 season with Aberdeen and was promoted to the Double–A Bowie Baysox during the season, but played in only 35 games between both teams due to a shoulder injury. Over those 35 games, he hit .265 with four home runs and 17 RBI. Ortiz returned to Bowie to begin the 2022 season. In late August, he was promoted to the Norfolk Tides. Across 137 games between both teams, he slashed .284/.349/.477 with 19 home runs, 85 RBI, and 35 doubles.

On November 15, 2022, the Orioles selected Ortiz's contract and added him to the 40–man roster to protect him from the Rule 5 draft. Ortiz was optioned to Triple-A Norfolk to begin the 2023 season.

On April 27, 2023, Ortiz was promoted to the major leagues for the first time. At the time of his promotion, he was hitting .359/.389/.500 with eight RBI. Ortiz was shuffled between the major leagues and minor leagues three times during the year, and spent the final three months of the season with Norfolk in Triple-A. In 15 games for the Orioles during his rookie campaign, Ortiz batted .212/.206/.242 with no home runs and eight RBI. Over 88 games with Norfolk, he hit .321 with nine home runs and 58 RBI.

=== Milwaukee Brewers ===
==== 2024 season ====
On February 1, 2024, the Orioles traded Ortiz and DL Hall to the Milwaukee Brewers in exchange for right-handed pitcher Corbin Burnes. Ortiz was included in multiple trade offers throughout the offseason, as the Orioles had a surplus of talent in their infield. On March 25, Ortiz was informed that he made the major league roster for the Brewers out of spring training. He started at second base on Opening Day, but quickly found himself in a timeshare at third base with fellow rookie Oliver Dunn. Ortiz was effectively handed the starting role when Dunn was optioned to the minor leagues on May 15. Ortiz was named National League Rookie of the Month in May. Over 142 games played during his rookie campaign, he hit .239 with 11 home runs, 60 RBI, and 25 doubles.

==== 2025 season ====
Ortiz became the Brewers' starting shortstop in 2025, after Willy Adames signed with the San Francisco Giants. He played in 149 games and batted .230 with seven home runs, 45 RBI, and 14 stolen bases.

==== 2026 season ====
In 2026, Ortiz lost his starting role at shortstop when rookie Cooper Pratt was called up in mid-June. Despite speculation that Ortiz may be demoted due to under-performance at the plate in the first half of the 2026 season (he was slashing .207/.299/.262 when Pratt was elevated), Ortiz became the Brewers' primary third baseman in the second half of the season and into the 2026 postseason. He improved into one of the MLB's best hitters in the second half: slashing .332/.378/.538 in his final 58 regular season appearances.

Ortiz finished the season, in which the Brewers set a franchise–record 103 wins to lead the majors, with nine home runs and a slash line of .270/.328/.402 across 134 games.

Ortiz during the victory parade for the 2026 World Series

The Brewers went on to win the 2026 World Series against the Tampa Bay Rays, with Ortiz appearing in nine postseason games, including three in the World Series. He became the first-ever NMSU Aggie to win a World Series.

== International career ==
Ortiz was selected to play for the Mexico national baseball team at the 2026 World Baseball Classic.

== Personal life ==
Ortiz and his wife, Iliana, were married in January 2025.
