= Kyle Harrison (baseball) =

American baseball player (born 2001)

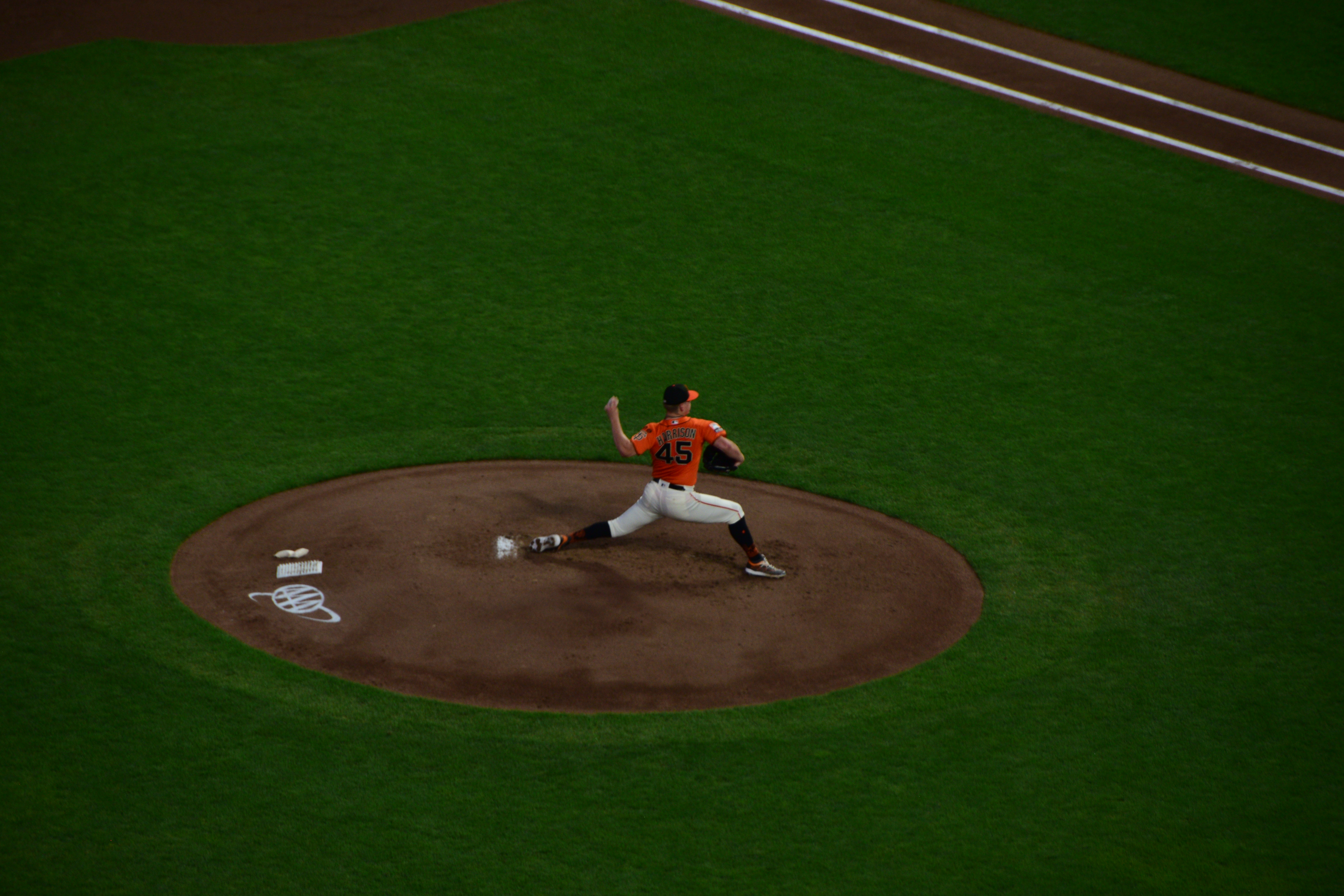
- Harrison with the San Francisco Giants

Milwaukee Brewers – No. 52
- Pitcher
- Born: August 12, 2001 (age 25); San Jose, California, U.S.
- Bats: Right Throws: Left

MLB debut
- August 22, 2023, for the San Francisco Giants

MLB statistics (through 2026 season)
- Win–loss record: 20–14
- Earned run average: 4.32
- Strikeouts: 332
- Stats at Baseball Reference

Teams
- San Francisco Giants (2023–2025); Boston Red Sox (2025); Milwaukee Brewers (2026–present)

Career highlights and awards
- World Series champion (2026)
Medals
Men's baseball
Representing United States
18U Baseball World Cup
Silver medal – second place	2019 Gijang	Team

Kyle Christopher Harrison (born August 12, 2001) is an American professional baseball pitcher for the Milwaukee Brewers of Major League Baseball (MLB). He has previously played in MLB for the San Francisco Giants and Boston Red Sox. The Giants selected Harrison in the third round of the 2020 MLB draft, and he made his MLB debut with them in 2023.

== Early life ==
Kyle Christopher Harrison was born on August 12, 2001, in San Jose, California. Harrison grew up in Orange County, California, and then from 2009 on in Danville, California. His father is Chris Harrison, and his mother Kim played college field hockey for San Jose State University.

His maternal grandfather is former left-handed major league pitcher Skip Guinn, who pitched in 68 games in parts of three seasons for the Atlanta Braves and Houston Astros in 1968–71. He has a younger brother Connor “Bear” Harrison.

In 2015, Harrison was a member of the Tri-Valley All-Stars, which won the Babe Ruth 13-year-old World Series. Four years later Harrison had the top earned run average (ERA) in the 2019 WBSC U-18 Baseball World Cup pitching for gold-medal winning Team USA, as he did not allow a run in 10 innings, while striking out 12 batters.

Harrison attended De La Salle High School in Concord, California in the San Francisco Bay Area. As a sophomore in 2018 he was 9–1 with a 1.17 ERA, as in 54 innings he had 71 strikeouts and walked 23 batters. He was named East Bay Athletic League Pitcher of the Year, a 2018 MaxPreps National All-American, and Cal-Hi Sports All-State Underclass. As a junior in 2019 he was 10–0 with a 1.26 ERA for the Spartans, with 103 strikeouts in 61 innings, and also played first base. As a senior in 2020, he was 2–0 with an 0.78 ERA and pitched nine innings with 18 strikeouts before the season was ended due to COVID-19. In his high school career, he was 21–1 with a 1.19 ERA in three years, striking out 192 batters in 124 innings, and held batters to a .137 batting average. He had a deceptive low below-three-quarter-slot delivery. By his senior year in high school his fastball touched 94 mph, and he also threw a high-70s slider, a change-up, and a curveball.

== Professional career ==
=== San Francisco Giants (2020–2025) ===
==== Draft and minor leagues ====
The San Francisco Giants selected Harrison in the third round of the 2020 Major League Baseball draft. Harrison signed with the Giants for a signing bonus of $2.5 million rather than play college baseball at the University of California, Los Angeles (UCLA). The Giants more than tripled their offer from the $710,000 slot value to sign Harrison. He did not play in a game in 2020 due to the cancellation of the minor league season because of the COVID-19 pandemic.

Harrison made his professional debut in 2021 with the Low-A San Jose Giants of the California League. Over 23 starts, he led the league with a 3.19 ERA and 15 hit batsmen and went 4–3 with 157 strikeouts (2nd in the league), and 14.3 strikeouts per nine innings (second) over 98 2/3 innings. He was named the 2021 Low-A West Pitcher of the Year, the CAL Pitcher of the Year, a CAL Post-Season All Star, and an MiLB.com Organization All Star.

Harrison was ranked #3 in the Giants' 2022 MLB prospect rankings. In 2022, he was an All-Star Futures Game selection. Harrison began the year with the High-A Eugene Emeralds, and in seven starts had 59 strikeouts in 29 innings (striking out half of the 118 batters he faced) and a 1.55 ERA. With the Double-A Richmond Flying Squirrels while almost five years younger than the average player in the league, as he was the youngest player in the history of the franchise and turned 21 in August, he had a 3.11 ERA in 84 innings (18 starts) with 127 strikeouts (6th in the league; as he struck out 36.4% of the batters he faced), for 13.6 strikeouts per 9 innings, and he generated a 41% whiff-and-miss percentage with his fastball. His 186 aggregate strikeouts in 2022 were the second-most of any pitcher in the minor leagues, and he led the minor leagues in both strikeouts per 9 innings (14.8; the highest rate for a pitcher in the minors–minimum 100 innings–in a season dating back to 1960) and whiff percentage (39.8%). Baseball America selected him as the Giants' 2022 Minor League Player of the Year, and as the best pitching prospect in the Eastern League, and he was again an MiLB.com Organization All Star.

In his minor league career through 2022, Harrison was 8–6 with a 2.93 ERA in 48 starts, as in 211 2/3 innings he struck out 343 batters (14.6 strikeouts per 9 innings).

Before the 2023 season, Harrison was ranked as the #18 prospect in the minor leagues by MLB.com. He started the 2023 season pitching for the Triple–A Sacramento River Cats, where at 21 years of age he was six and a half years younger than the average ballplayer. In 2023 Harrison was again an All-Star Futures Game selection. Before he was called up to the major leagues, he was the Giants' # 1 prospect, and the # 1 left-handed pitching prospect in the minor leagues per MLB.com, and with the River Cats in 20 starts he was 1–3 with a 4.66 ERA with 105 strikeouts (6th in the Pacific Coast League) and 48 walks in 65 2/3 innings, with 7.1 hits per 9 innings (10th), 14.4 strikeouts per 9 innings (2nd), a 35.6% strikeout percentage, and a 16.3% walk percentage.

==== Major leagues ====
Harrison made his major league debut on August 22, 2023 against the Philadelphia Phillies. At 22 years and 10 days old, Harrison was the youngest Giants pitcher since Madison Bumgarner in 2009. In 3 1/3 innings, he gave up five hits, two runs, hit a batter, and had five strikeouts. His fastball reached 97.6 mph; the only other left-handed Giants starter who threw that fast a pitch since 2008 was Carlos Rodón. On August 28, in a 4–1 win over the Cincinnati Reds, in his second start, Harrison pitched 6 1/3 shutout innings and struck out 11 batters, becoming the youngest Giant with that many strikeouts since Bumgarner on June 26, 2011. Harrison was the second pitcher in Giants history to have double-digit strikeouts in his second career start, following Jeff Tesreau with the New York Giants in 1912. It was Harrison's only win in the majors that year, as he finished with a 1–1 record and 4.19 ERA in 7 starts.

Harrison made 24 starts for San Francisco in his rookie season in 2024, with a 7–7 record and 4.56 ERA with 118 strikeouts across 124 1/3 innings pitched.

Harrison was optioned to Triple-A Sacramento to begin the 2025 season. He was recalled to the big league club after their game on May 5, but this time to serve as a reliever. In eight appearances for the team, Harrison posted a 1-1 record and 4.56 ERA with 25 strikeouts across 23 2/3 innings pitched.

=== Boston Red Sox (2025) ===
On June 15, 2025, the Giants traded Harrison to the Boston Red Sox, along with Jordan Hicks, James Tibbs III, and Jose Bello, in exchange for Rafael Devers. Harrison made three appearances (including two starts) for Boston, recording a 3.00 ERA with 13 strikeouts across 12 innings pitched.

=== Milwaukee Brewers (2026-present) ===
On February 9, 2026, the Red Sox traded Harrison, David Hamilton, and Shane Drohan to the Milwaukee Brewers in exchange for Caleb Durbin, Andruw Monasterio, Anthony Seigler, and a compensation round draft pick in the 2026 MLB draft. He made his Brewers debut on March 30, against the Tampa Bay Rays. Harrison was part of the Milwaukee's postseason roster, but failed to appear in a game as the team went on to win the 2026 World Series, earning him his first championship.

== Pitching style ==
A video of Harrison's delivery

Harrison pitches with a low three-quarter release, and has a mid-90s rising four-seam fastball that reaches 98-mile-per-hour (158 km/h) at times, a low-80s slider with a big lateral break (his best swing-and-miss pitch), and a developing mid-80s one-seam changeup.
