= Robert Gasser =

American baseball player (born 1999)

- Gasser during the 2026 World Series victory parade

Milwaukee Brewers – No. 54
- Pitcher
- Born: May 31, 1999 (age 27); El Dorado Hills, California, U.S.
- Bats: Left Throws: Left

MLB debut
- May 10, 2024, for the Milwaukee Brewers

MLB statistics (through 2026 season)
- Win–loss record: 7–7
- Earned run average: 3.59
- Strikeouts: 124
- Stats at Baseball Reference

Teams
- Milwaukee Brewers (2024–present)

Career highlights and awards
- World Series champion (2026)

Robert Riordan Gasser (born May 31, 1999) is an American professional baseball pitcher for the Milwaukee Brewers of Major League Baseball (MLB). He made his MLB debut in 2024.

== Amateur career ==
Gasser grew up in El Dorado Hills, California, and attended Oak Ridge High School. Gasser enrolled at the University of New Mexico and began his college baseball career with the New Mexico Lobos. As a freshman in 2018, he was 2-4 and had a 7.05 ERA over 52 innings pitched.

Gasser transferred to San Joaquin Delta College after his freshman year. In his only season with the Mustangs, he went 14-0 with a 2.38 ERA and 139 strikeouts in 102 innings pitched over 18 appearances with 17 starts. Gasser transferred to the University of Houston to play for the Houston Cougars for his remaining collegiate eligibility. In 2020, in 7.1 innings he gave up 9 earned runs. In 2021, Gasser went 6-6 with a 2.63 ERA and 105 strikeouts in 85 2/3 innings pitched and was named first team All-American Athletic Conference.

== Professional career ==
=== San Diego Padres ===
The San Diego Padres selected Gasser with the 71st overall pick in the 2021 Major League Baseball draft. He was assigned to the Rookie-level Arizona Complex League Padres to start his professional career, where he made one appearance before being promoted to the Lake Elsinore Storm of Low-A West.

Gasser began the 2022 season with the High-A Fort Wayne TinCaps and then pitched as well for the Biloxi Shuckers and the Nashville Sounds, posting a collective 7-12 record and 3.94 ERA with 172 strikeouts in 137 innings pitched across 27 starts.

=== Milwaukee Brewers ===
On August 1, 2022, the Padres traded Gasser, Dinelson Lamet, Taylor Rogers, and Esteury Ruiz to the Milwaukee Brewers for Josh Hader. The Brewers assigned him to the Biloxi Shuckers of the Double-A Southern League. In 2023, playing for the Triple-A Nashville Sounds, Gasser won the International League Pitcher of the Year Award after leading the league with 166 strikeouts and 15 hit batsmen, and posting a 3.79 ERA.

Gasser began the 2024 season back with Triple–A Nashville, going 0-1 and compiling a 5.25 ERA with 17 strikeouts across three starts. On May 10, 2024, Gasser was selected to the 40-man roster and promoted to the major leagues for the first time. He made his first MLB start the same day and didn't give up a run across six innings, allowing just two hits, no walks, and striking out four. The Milwaukee Journal-Sentinel called the performance "a Brewers major-league debut for the ages." He continued to have one of the best beginnings to a pitching career in franchise history, becoming the third Brewer since 1984 (along with Brandon Woodruff and Freddy Peralta) to record an ERA below 2.00 in his first four career starts. On June 20, it was announced that Gasser would require season–ending surgery to repair the ulnar collateral ligament in his pitching elbow.

On August 30, 2025, Gasser was activated from the injured list and optioned to Triple-A Nashville. He made two starts for Milwaukee over the remainder of the season, going 0-2 and recording a 3.18 ERA with five strikeouts and four walks across 5 2/3 innings pitched. He pitched twice out of the bullpen in the post-season, and in 2.2 innings gave up 2 earned runs, 6 hits including 2 home runs, and 2 walks while striking out 2 batters.

==== 2026 ====
Gasser was optioned to Triple-A Nashville to begin the 2026 season. Coming back to the majors mid-season, Gasser cemented himself as part of the rotation. In 21 MLB appearances with 20 starts, he collected a 3.87 ERA across 109.1 innings; his final five starts in September were his best of the year, posting an ERA of 1.67 over 27 innings.

In the postseason, Gasser was the Brewers' most-effective starting pitcher en route to the 2026 World Series. In three starts against the Padres, Dodgers and Rays, he allowed one run in 15 innings, going 1-0 with a 0.60 ERA. His postseason was capped by six innings, allowing one hit to the Rays while facing the minimum in World Series Game 3, which Milwaukee won 10-1.

It was during the Brewers' World Series run that Gasser gained the nickname "Bobby Diesel" from Brewers broadcasters and fans.

== Personal life ==
Actor Vin Diesel is a close friend of Gasser's father Jim, and often attended Gasser's high school games.

== See also ==
- List of World Series starting pitchers
