= David Hamilton (baseball) =

American baseball player (born 1997)

- Hamilton playing in game 2 of the 2026 NLCS

Milwaukee Brewers – No. 6
- Infielder
- Born: September 29, 1997 (age 29); San Marcos, Texas, U.S.
- Bats: Left Throws: Right

MLB debut
- June 21, 2023, for the Boston Red Sox

MLB statistics (through 2026 season)
- Batting average: .231
- Home runs: 18
- Runs batted in: 73
- Stolen bases: 87
- Stats at Baseball Reference

Teams
- Boston Red Sox (2023–2025); Milwaukee Brewers (2026–present)

Career highlights and awards
- World Series champion (2026)

David Lewis Hamilton Jr. (born September 29, 1997) is an American professional baseball infielder for the Milwaukee Brewers of Major League Baseball (MLB). He has previously played in MLB for the Boston Red Sox.

== Career ==
=== Amateur career ===
Hamilton attended San Marcos High School in San Marcos, Texas. The Los Angeles Angels selected him in the 28th round of the 2016 MLB draft, but he did not sign with the Angels. He enrolled at the University of Texas at Austin, where he played college baseball for the Texas Longhorns. In 2018, he played collegiate summer baseball with the Yarmouth–Dennis Red Sox of the Cape Cod Baseball League. He tore his achilles tendon in an electric scooter accident, causing him to miss his junior season in 2019.

=== Milwaukee Brewers ===
The Milwaukee Brewers selected Hamilton in the eighth round, with the 253rd overall selection, of the 2019 Major League Baseball draft. He signed with the Brewers, forgoing his senior season at Texas.

During the 2020 season, Hamilton played for Team Texas in the Constellation Energy League, following the cancellation of the 2020 Minor League Baseball season due to the COVID-19 pandemic. In 2021, he played for the Wisconsin Timber Rattlers in High-A Central. Hamilton stole six bases in a game on June 2, setting a franchise record. In August, the Brewers promoted him to the Biloxi Shuckers of Double-A South.

=== Boston Red Sox ===
On December 1, 2021, the Brewers traded Hamilton, Jackie Bradley Jr., and Alex Binelas to the Boston Red Sox in exchange for Hunter Renfroe. In his first game with the Double-A Portland Sea Dogs, Hamilton went 5-for-7 with two home runs, seven RBI, and a stolen base. In 2022 in the minor leagues he had a slash line of .251/.338/.402 in 463 at-bats and was tied for third in the minor leagues in stolen bases, with 70, while being caught eight times. He was named the minor league Baserunner of the Year by the Red Sox organization.

On November 15, 2022, Hamilton was added to Boston's 40-man roster in order to remain protected from the Rule 5 draft. Hamilton was optioned to the Triple-A Worcester Red Sox to begin the 2023 season. In 52 games, he slashed .255/.339/.486 with 11 home runs, 25 RBI, and 27 stolen bases. On June 21, 2023, Hamilton was promoted to the major leagues for the first time. He was optioned back to Worcester on July 7 after appearing in 13 games and batting .138. Hamilton was recalled to Boston on August 28. On September 22, Hamilton underwent season–ending surgery to repair a torn UCL in his left thumb. In 15 major league games for Boston, he had a slash line of .121/.256/.182 with no home runs or RBI, and two stolen bases. In September, Hamilton was recognized as the Red Sox' minor league defensive player of the year for 2023.

Hamilton was optioned to Triple–A Worcester to begin the 2024 season. Entering the season, he was ranked as the Red Sox' number 20 minor league prospect by Baseball America. Hamilton was activated by Boston in early April, following an injury to Trevor Story. Hamilton made his season debut on April 7 against the Los Angeles Angels, in which he hit his first major-league home run in the third inning. He made 98 appearances for Boston during the regular season, batting .248/.303/.395 with eight home runs, 28 RBI, and 33 stolen bases.

Hamilton played in 91 games for the Red Sox during the 2025 campaign, slashing .198/.257/.333 with six home runs, 19 RBI, and 22 stolen bases.

=== Milwaukee Brewers ===
On February 9, 2026, the Red Sox traded Hamilton, Kyle Harrison, and Shane Drohan to the Milwaukee Brewers in exchange for Caleb Durbin, Andruw Monasterio, Anthony Seigler, and a compensation round draft pick in the 2026 MLB draft. He was the starting third baseman on the Brewers' Opening Day roster. Hamilton appeared in a career-high 121 games, batted .245/.314/.336, stole 30 bases, and led the majors with 13 sacrifice hits.

Hamilton was a surprise core piece of the Brewers run to win the 2026 World Series. In the postseason, he was second on the team in OPS (.950, behind World Series MVP William Contreras' 1.037), led the team in slugging (.593) and was third in batting average (.333) in nine games and 29 plate appearances. This included two home runs, half his regular season total in 110 fewer games.

Hamilton's top-of-the-ninth solo home run off of Edwin Díaz in Game 4 of the 2026 NLCS capped off a sweep of the Los Angeles Dodgers, providing the final run of a 6-4 win that sent the Brewers to their first World Series since 1982. It was his fifth home run of 2026. In game four of the World Series, Hamilton committed a throwing error that gave the Tampa Bay Rays to take a 2-1 lead, before immediately homering to tie the game in the top of the ensuing inning; the Brewers would lose that game in 12 innings, but finished the series in the fifth game. Hamilton started all five games at third base in the Fall Classic for the Brewers.

== Personal life ==
His parents are Bessie and David Hamilton Sr. who played baseball at Southwest Texas State University (now Texas State University) from 1986-87.
