= Aaron Ashby =

American baseball player (born 1998)

- Ashby with the Milwaukee Brewers during the 2026 World Series

Milwaukee Brewers – No. 26
- Pitcher
- Born: May 24, 1998 (age 28); Kansas City, Missouri, U.S.
- Bats: Right Throws: Left

MLB debut
- June 30, 2021, for the Milwaukee Brewers

MLB statistics (through 2026 season)
- Win–loss record: 24–19
- Earned run average: 3.48
- Strikeouts: 390
- Stats at Baseball Reference

Teams
- Milwaukee Brewers (2021–2022, 2024–present)

Career highlights and awards
- World Series champion (2026)

Aaron Phillip Ashby (born May 24, 1998) is an American professional baseball pitcher for the Milwaukee Brewers of Major League Baseball (MLB). The Brewers chose Ashby in the fourth round of the 2018 MLB draft. He made his MLB debut in 2021.

In 2026, Ashby was a core piece of the Brewers' first ever World Series championship, putting together one of the most exceptional runs of relief pitching in baseball history: allowing zero runs in nine appearances across 18 innings, an MLB postseason record.

== Career ==
Ashby attended Park Hill High School in Kansas City, Missouri, graduating in 2016. He enrolled at Crowder College, a public community college, where he played college baseball. The Texas Rangers of Major League Baseball (MLB) selected Ashby in the 25th round, with the 764th overall selection, of the 2017 MLB draft. He did not sign with the Rangers and returned to Crowder.

The Milwaukee Brewers selected Ashby in the fourth round, with the 125th overall selection, of the 2018 Major League Baseball draft. He made his professional debut with the rookie-level Helena Brewers, and also played for the Single-A Wisconsin Timber Rattlers, posting a 2–3 record with one save and a 3.59 ERA with 66 strikeouts over 13 games. In 2019, Ashby split the season between Wisconsin and the High-A Carolina Mudcats, logging a 5–10 record and 3.50 ERA and 135 strikeouts in 24 appearances between the two affiliates.

Ashby did not play in a game in 2020, when the minor league season was canceled because of the COVID-19 pandemic. He was assigned to the Triple-A Nashville Sounds to begin the 2021 season. Ashby was shifted to the bullpen in June, and recorded a 4–1 record and 4.50 ERA in 12 games for the team.

The Brewers promoted Ashby to the major leagues on June 30, 2021. Ashby made his MLB debut that day as the starting pitcher against the Chicago Cubs. In his debut, he went 2/3 of an inning and allowed seven runs, four earned. At the end of his rookie campaign, Ashby made 13 appearances (four starts), and logged a 3–2 record with one save and a 4.55 ERA with 39 strikeouts across 31 2/3 innings pitched.

On July 23, 2022, the Brewers and Ashby agreed on a five-year contract extension that keeps him under contract through the 2027 season, with club options for 2028 and 2029. He made 27 appearances (19 starts) for Milwaukee in 2022, registering a 2–10 record with one save and a 4.44 ERA with 126 strikeouts over 107 1/3 innings pitched in which he had 7 wild pitches (9th in the league).

On February 16, 2023, it was announced that Ashby would miss "a couple of months" with left shoulder inflammation. On April 5, manager Craig Counsell announced that Ashby required arthroscopic surgery on his left shoulder and would likely miss the entire 2023 season. In 2023, pitching for the Nashville Sounds, Biloxi Shuckers, and Wisconsin Timber Rattlers, he was 0-3 with a 15.43 ERA in 7 games.

The Brewers optioned Ashby to Triple–A Nashville to begin the 2024 season, where he was 4-7 with an 8.04 ERA (the highest in the International League) in 25 games, as in 84 innings with 17 wild pitches (leading the league) as he gave up 95 hits and 73 walks (third-most in the league, with a league-leading 7.8 walks/9 innings), and struck out 92 batters, with a WHIP of 2.00 (the highest in the league). He was called back up to the Brewers in August and pitched well in a bullpen role, as he was 1-2 with a 2.86 ERA in 14 games in which he pitched 28 1/3 innings, striking out 33 batters.

Going into the 2025 season's spring training, Ashby was in contention for a spot in the Brewers' starting rotation. Then he suffered a strained oblique that prevented him from throwing for about two weeks.

In a breakout 2025 campaign, Ashby in 43 games had among the most innings pitched out of the Brewers bullpen (66 2/3) with a 2.16 ERA—accumulating 1.1 Wins Above Replacement according to Fangraphs, among the top 40 relievers in the MLB that season—as he helped his team finish with the best record in baseball.

=== 2026 season ===
Ashby during game 2 of the 2026 NLCS

Ashby made 75 total appearances (including one start) for Milwaukee in 2026, compiling a 13–3 record and 3.12 ERA with 116 strikeouts and four saves across 89 1/3 innings pitched.

Ashby delivered one of the most dominant relief performances in MLB history during the postseason, helping the Brewers capture their first ever World Series title. Across 18 innings and nine appearances, he allowed zero runs, breaking the record previously set by Andrew Miller for the most consecutive scoreless relief innings in a single postseason. He also collected 20 strikeouts to lead the team, a WHIP of 0.444, and three saves. In three World Series appearances, Ashby allowed just one hit and no walks in 5-2/3 innings.

== Personal life ==
Aaron is the nephew of former MLB pitcher Andy Ashby. He is married to Avery Ashby. They have a son. Ashby is a Christian.

While attending Park Hill High School, Ashby became friends with NBA champion and New York Knicks player Landry Shamet.
