= Jeferson Quero =

Venezuelan baseball player (born 2002)

Milwaukee Brewers – No. 15
- Catcher
- Born: October 8, 2002 (age 24); Barquisimeto, Venezuela
- Bats: Right Throws: Right

MLB debut
- March 29, 2026, for the Milwaukee Brewers

MLB statistics (through 2026 season)
- Batting average: .000
- Home runs: 0
- Runs batted in: 0
- Stats at Baseball Reference

Teams
- Milwaukee Brewers (2026–present)

Jeferson José Quero (born October 8, 2002) is a Venezuelan professional baseball catcher for the Milwaukee Brewers of Major League Baseball (MLB).

== Career ==
Quero signed with the Milwaukee Brewers as an international free agent on July 2, 2019. He did not play in a game in 2020 due to the cancellation of the minor league season because of the COVID-19 pandemic. Quero made his professional debut in 2021 with the rookie-level Arizona Complex League Brewers.

Quero started 2022 with the Carolina Mudcats before being promoted to the Wisconsin Timber Rattlers. After the season, he played in the Arizona Fall League.

On November 13, 2023, the Brewers added Quero to their 40-man roster to protect him from the Rule 5 draft. He was optioned to the Triple–A Nashville Sounds to begin the 2024 season. Quero played in one game for Nashville before suffering a torn labrum and other shoulder damage. On April 10, 2024, it was announced that he would undergo surgery to repair the injury; the expected recovery time was listed at nine months, effectively ending his season. Doctors puts twelve staples placed into Quero's injured shoulder, and he was unable to move his arm for months. As a result, Quero's rehab included the need to relearn his throwing mechanics.

Quero suffered a hamstring strain during spring training and was optioned to Triple-A Nashville to begin the 2025 season. He made several rehabilitation starts for the Brewers' Arizona Complex League affiliate before returning to Nashville, where was given frequent rest starts at designated hitter to avoid overworking the shoulder during regular defensive work at catcher.

Quero was again optioned to Triple-A Nashville to begin the 2026 season. On March 28, 2026, Quero was promoted to the major leagues for the first time after Andrew Vaughn was placed on the injured list. Quero made one appearance for the Brewers in 2026 before spending the rest of the season in the minors. The Brewers later went on to win the 2026 World Series that year.
