= Luis Lara =

Venezuelan baseball player (born 2004)

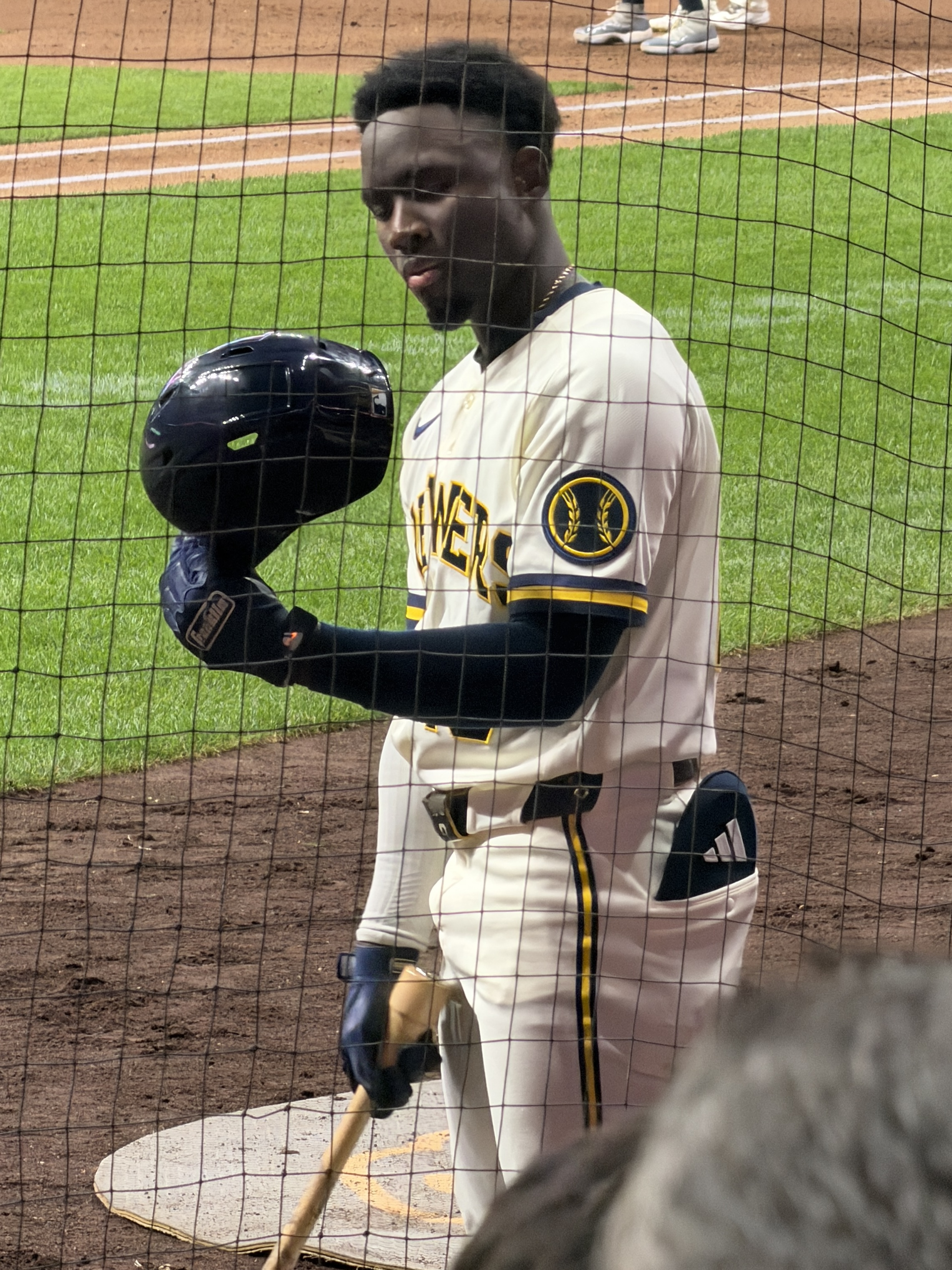
- Lara with the Milwaukee Brewers in 2026

Milwaukee Brewers – No. 18
- Outfielder
- Born: November 17, 2004 (age 21); San Felipe, Venezuela
- Bats: Switch Throws: Right

MLB debut
- July 7, 2026, for the Milwaukee Brewers

MLB statistics (through 2026 season)
- Battering average: .246
- Home runs: 1
- Runs batted in: 26
- Stats at Baseball Reference

Teams
- Milwaukee Brewers (2026–present)

Career highlights and awards
- World Series champion (2026)

Luis Alexander Lara (born November 17, 2004) is a Venezuelan professional baseball outfielder for the Milwaukee Brewers of Major League Baseball (MLB).

== Career ==
Lara signed with the Milwaukee Brewers as an international free agent in June 2022. He made his professional debut that season with the Dominican Summer League Brewers. He played 2023 with the Carolina Mudcats and 2024 with Carolina and the Wisconsin Timber Rattlers. After the 2024 season, he played in the Arizona Fall League. Lara played 2025 with the Biloxi Shuckers and started 2026 with the Nashville Sounds.

Lara during the 2026 World Series victory parade

On June 9, 2026, the Brewers announced that Lara had agreed to a seven-year, $31 million contract extension. On July 7, Lara was promoted to the major leagues for the first time. He made his major league debut the same day, collecting one hit and two RBI against the St. Louis Cardinals. On August 18, he hit his first career home run in a game against the Seattle Mariners.
