= Logan Henderson (baseball) =

American baseball player (born 2002)

- Henderson with the Milwaukee Brewers in 2026

Milwaukee Brewers – No. 43
- Pitcher
- Born: March 2, 2002 (age 24); Houston, Texas, U.S.
- Bats: Right Throws: Right

MLB debut
- April 20, 2025, for the Milwaukee Brewers

MLB statistics (through 2026 season)
- Win–loss record: 14–3
- Earned run average: 2.33
- Strikeouts: 143
- Stats at Baseball Reference

Teams
- Milwaukee Brewers (2025–present)

Career highlights and awards
- World Series champion (2026)

Logan Blake Henderson (born March 2, 2002) is an American professional baseball pitcher for the Milwaukee Brewers of Major League Baseball (MLB). He made his MLB debut in 2025.

== Career ==
Henderson attended Cinco Ranch High School in Katy, Texas and played college baseball at McLennan Community College. He was selected by the Milwaukee Brewers in the fourth round of the 2021 Major League Baseball draft.

Henderson signed with the Brewers and spent his first professional season in 2022 with the Arizona Complex League Brewers and Carolina Mudcats. He spent the 2023 campaign back with Carolina. Henderson split the 2024 campaign between the ACL Brewers, the High–A Wisconsin Timber Rattlers, Double–A Biloxi Shuckers, and Triple–A Nashville Sounds, accumulating a 7–6 record and 3.32 ERA with 104 strikeouts across 81 1/3 innings pitched. On November 19, 2024, the Brewers added to their 40-man roster to protect him from the Rule 5 draft.

Henderson was optioned to Triple-A Nashville to begin the 2025 season. On April 15, 2025, Henderson was promoted to the major leagues for the first time. On April 20, he made his MLB debut, earning the win after tossing six innings against the Athletics, striking out nine and allowing one run. Henderson was placed on the 15-day injured list on August 10, with inflammation in his right elbow. On August 27, the Brewers moved Henderson to the 60-day injured list.

Henderson was optioned to Triple-A Nashville to begin the 2026 season. He was called up in April and pitched well, went on the IL in late May with a back injury, and returned in June. He had a very successful season, making 18 starts, and posting a record of 11-3, to go with an ERA of 2.47.

Henderson was called upon by Brewers' manager Pat Murphy to start the team's second playoff game, against the San Diego Padres in the NLDS. Henderson gave up two runs, one earned, in five innings, getting a no decision in the Brewers' 4-3 victory. The Brewers won the best-of-five series in four games and advanced to the NLCS, where Henderson was called upon to start game 2 against the Los Angeles Dodgers. In that game, Henderson had to overcome his own fielding issues, as he twice threw the ball away trying to throw to first base, in the third and fifth innings. He was pulled after the second error, charged with four runs, two earned, in 4+ innings, but was bailed out by the Brewers' offense, as the team jumped to a 2-0 series lead over the defending world champions with a 7-4 victory. The Brewers won the best-of-seven series in a four game sweep to advance to the 2026 World Series, where Henderson started against the Tampa Bay Rays in game 2. After Game 5 of the series, the Brewers won their first title in franchise history.

== See also ==
- List of World Series starting pitchers
