= Trevor Megill =

American baseball player (born 1993)

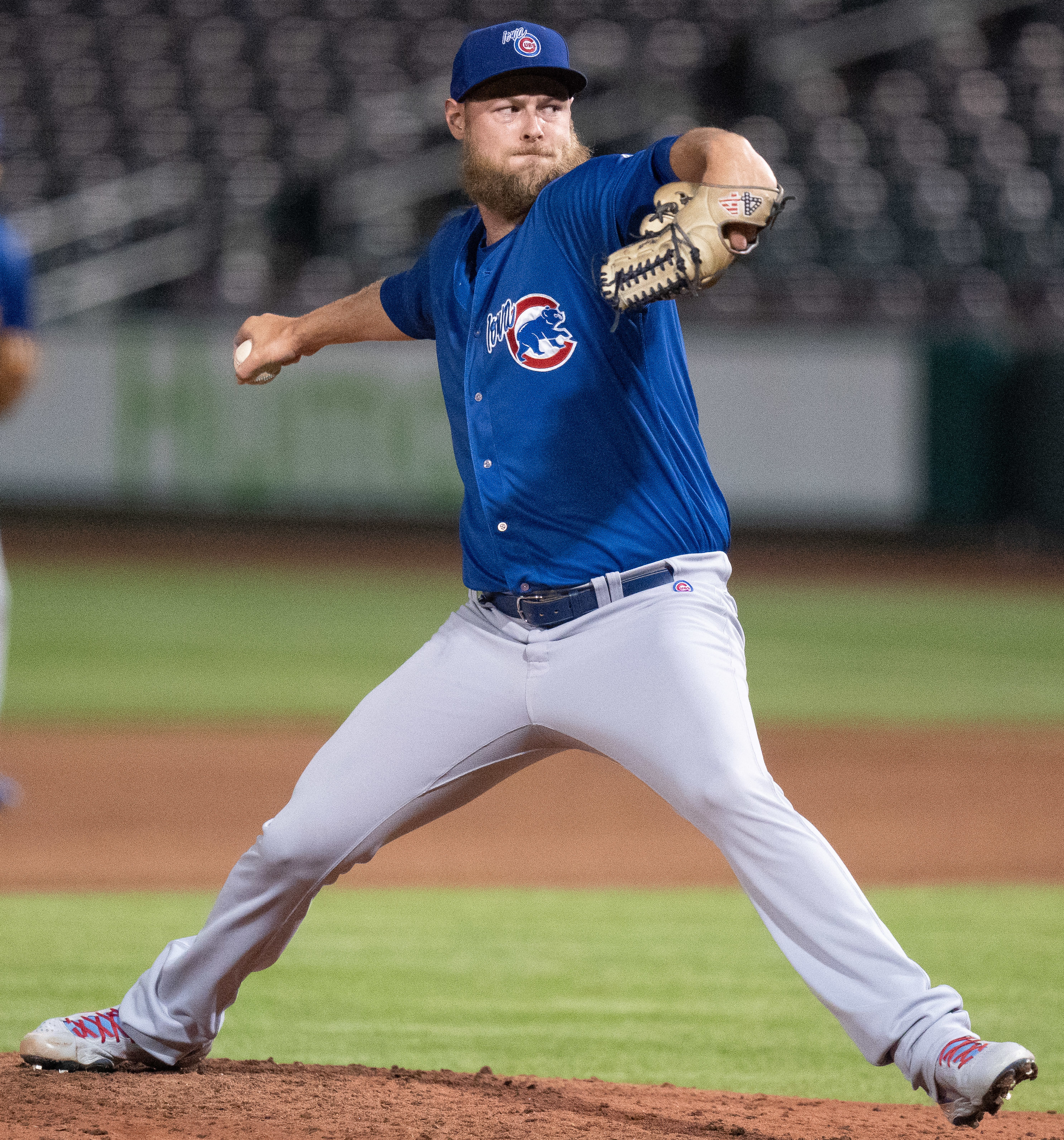
- Megill with the Iowa Cubs in 2021

Milwaukee Brewers – No. 29
- Pitcher
- Born: December 5, 1993 (age 32); Long Beach, California, U.S.
- Bats: Left Throws: Right

MLB debut
- April 26, 2021, for the Chicago Cubs

MLB statistics (through 2026 season)
- Win–loss record: 16–14
- Earned run average: 3.66
- Strikeouts: 310
- Saves: 81
- Stats at Baseball Reference

Teams
- Chicago Cubs (2021); Minnesota Twins (2022); Milwaukee Brewers (2023–present)

Career highlights and awards
- All-Star (2025); World Series champion (2026)

Trevor J. Megill (born December 5, 1993) is an American professional baseball pitcher for the Milwaukee Brewers of Major League Baseball (MLB). He has previously played in MLB for the Chicago Cubs and Minnesota Twins. He was drafted by the San Diego Padres in the 7th round of the 2015 MLB draft. In 2025, Megill was named to his first All-Star game.

== Amateur career ==
Megill attended Marina High School in Huntington Beach, California. He left high school early, and graduated through Opportunities For Learning Public Charter School. Undrafted out of high school, he attended Loyola Marymount University. Megill missed his junior season after undergoing Tommy John surgery. He was drafted by the St. Louis Cardinals in the 3rd round, with the 104th overall selection, of the 2014 MLB draft, but did not sign and returned to college. After the 2014 season, he played collegiate summer baseball with the Orleans Firebirds of the Cape Cod Baseball League.

== Professional career ==
=== San Diego Padres ===
Megill was drafted by the San Diego Padres in the 7th round, with 207th overall selection, of the 2015 Major League Baseball draft, and signed with them.

Megill split the 2015 season between the Arizona League Padres and the Tri-City Dust Devils, going a combined 2–0 with a 3.16 ERA over 31 1/3 innings. Megill did not appear in a game in 2016 due to issues with bone spurs. He split the 2017 season between the AZL Padres, Tri-City, and the Lake Elsinore Storm, going 5–0 with a 2.63 ERA over 27 1/3 innings. He split the 2018 season between the AZL Padres, Lake Elsinore, and the San Antonio Missions, going a combined 2–1 with a 3.35 ERA over 37 2/3 innings. Megill split the 2019 season between Lake Elsinore, the Amarillo Sod Poodles, and El Paso Chihuahuas, going a combined 2–2 with a 3.86 ERA over 60 2/3 innings.

=== Chicago Cubs ===
On December 12, 2019, Megill was selected by the Chicago Cubs in the Rule 5 draft. Observers speculated at the time that Megill's exposure to Rule 5 eligibility was largely the result of the Padres' deep farm system. On July 17, 2020, Megill was returned to the Padres organization. After being returned, the Cubs traded cash considerations to reacquire Megill.

Megill did not play in a game in 2020 due to the cancellation of the Minor League Baseball season because of the COVID-19 pandemic.

On April 26, 2021, Megill was selected to the 40–man roster and promoted to the major leagues for the first time. He made his MLB debut that day, pitching a scoreless sixth inning against the Atlanta Braves. In the game, Megill also notched his first major league strikeout, punching out Braves second baseman Ozzie Albies. Megill made 28 appearances for Chicago during his rookie campaign, posting an 8.37 ERA and 30 strikeouts.

=== Minnesota Twins ===
On November 30, 2021, Megill was claimed off of waivers by the Minnesota Twins. However, the same day, Megill was non-tendered by the Twins and became a free agent. On December 5, Megill re-signed with the Twins on a minor league contract. On May 21, 2022, Megill had his contract selected by the Twins. Megill made 39 relief appearances for Minnesota in 2022, posting a 4–3 record and 4.80 ERA with 49 strikeouts in 45 innings pitched.

Megill was optioned to the Triple-A St. Paul Saints to begin the 2023 season. In seven games with St. Paul, he struggled to a 13.03 ERA with 16 strikeouts in 9 2/3 innings of work. On April 25, 2023, Megill was designated for assignment by Minnesota following the promotion of Brock Stewart.

Megill, closing for the Brewers in 2025.

=== Milwaukee Brewers ===
On April 30, 2023, Megill was traded to the Milwaukee Brewers in exchange for a player to be named later or cash considerations. Megill made 31 relief appearances for Milwaukee in 2023, posting a 1–0 record and 3.63 ERA with 52 strikeouts in 34 2/3 innings pitched.

In 2024, Megill made 48 relief appearances for Milwaukee as the Brewers' closing pitcher, posting a 1–3 record and 2.72 ERA with 21 saves and 50 strikeouts in 46 1/3 innings pitched. The following season, Megill was voted to the 2025 Major League Baseball All-Star Game.

Megill recorded the final six outs of the final game of the 2026 World Series against the Tampa Bay Rays, securing the first-ever Milwaukee Brewers championship. Throughout the postseason, Megill posted a 2.00 ERA in nine innings across eight appearances, finishing seven games and striking out 11.

== Personal life ==
Megill's younger brother, Tylor, is a pitcher for the New York Mets.

== See also ==
- Rule 5 draft results

Awards and achievements
Preceded by Mason Miller	National League Reliever of the Month; August 2026	Succeeded by Mason Montgomery
