= DL Hall =

American baseball player (born 1998)

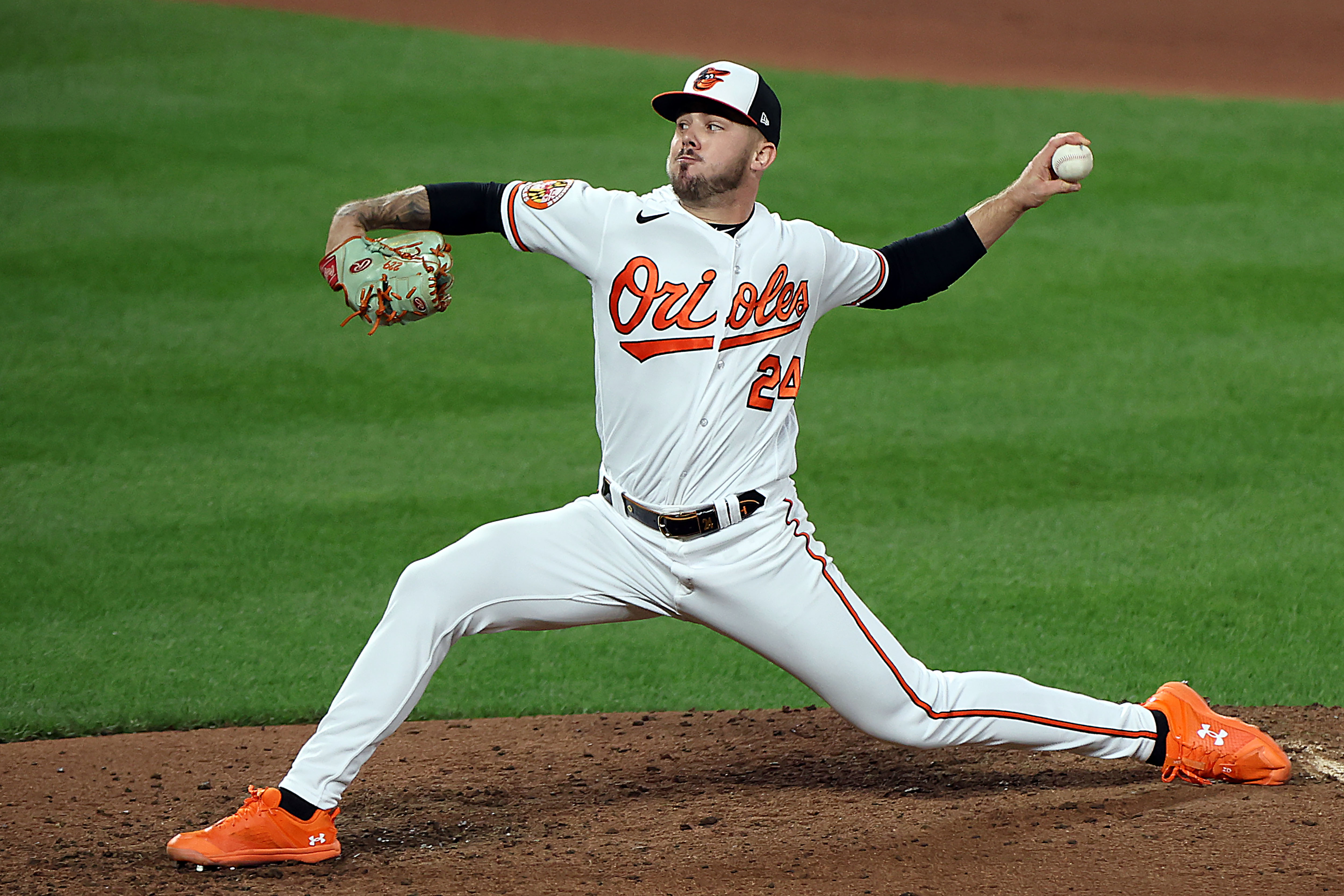
- Hall with the Orioles in 2023

Milwaukee Brewers – No. 37
- Pitcher
- Born: September 19, 1998 (age 28); Valdosta, Georgia, U.S.
- Bats: Left Throws: Left

MLB debut
- August 13, 2022, for the Baltimore Orioles

MLB statistics (through 2026 season)
- Win–loss record: 10–3
- Earned run average: 3.48
- Strikeouts: 177
- Stats at Baseball Reference

Teams
- Baltimore Orioles (2022–2023); Milwaukee Brewers (2024–present)

Career highlights and awards
- World Series champion (2026)

Dayton Layne Hall (born September 19, 1998) is an American professional baseball pitcher for the Milwaukee Brewers of Major League Baseball (MLB). He has previously played in MLB for the Baltimore Orioles. He made his MLB debut in 2022.

== Amateur career ==
Hall attended Valdosta High School in Valdosta, Georgia as a freshman before transferring to Houston County High School in Warner Robins, Georgia. As a junior, he was 6–1 with a 1.81 earned run average (ERA) and 89 strikeouts. During summer 2016, he played in the Under Armour All-America Baseball Game at Wrigley Field and the Perfect Game All-American Game at Petco Park. Prior to his senior season, Hall transferred back to Valdosta. Hall committed to Florida State University to play college baseball.

== Professional career ==
=== Baltimore Orioles ===
The Baltimore Orioles selected Hall in the first round, with the 21st overall selection, of the 2017 Major League Baseball draft. He signed with the Orioles and was assigned to the Gulf Coast League Orioles, giving up eight earned runs in 10 1/3 innings pitched. He spent 2018 with the Delmarva Shorebirds, going 2–7 with a 2.10 ERA and a 1.17 WHIP in 22 games (twenty starts).

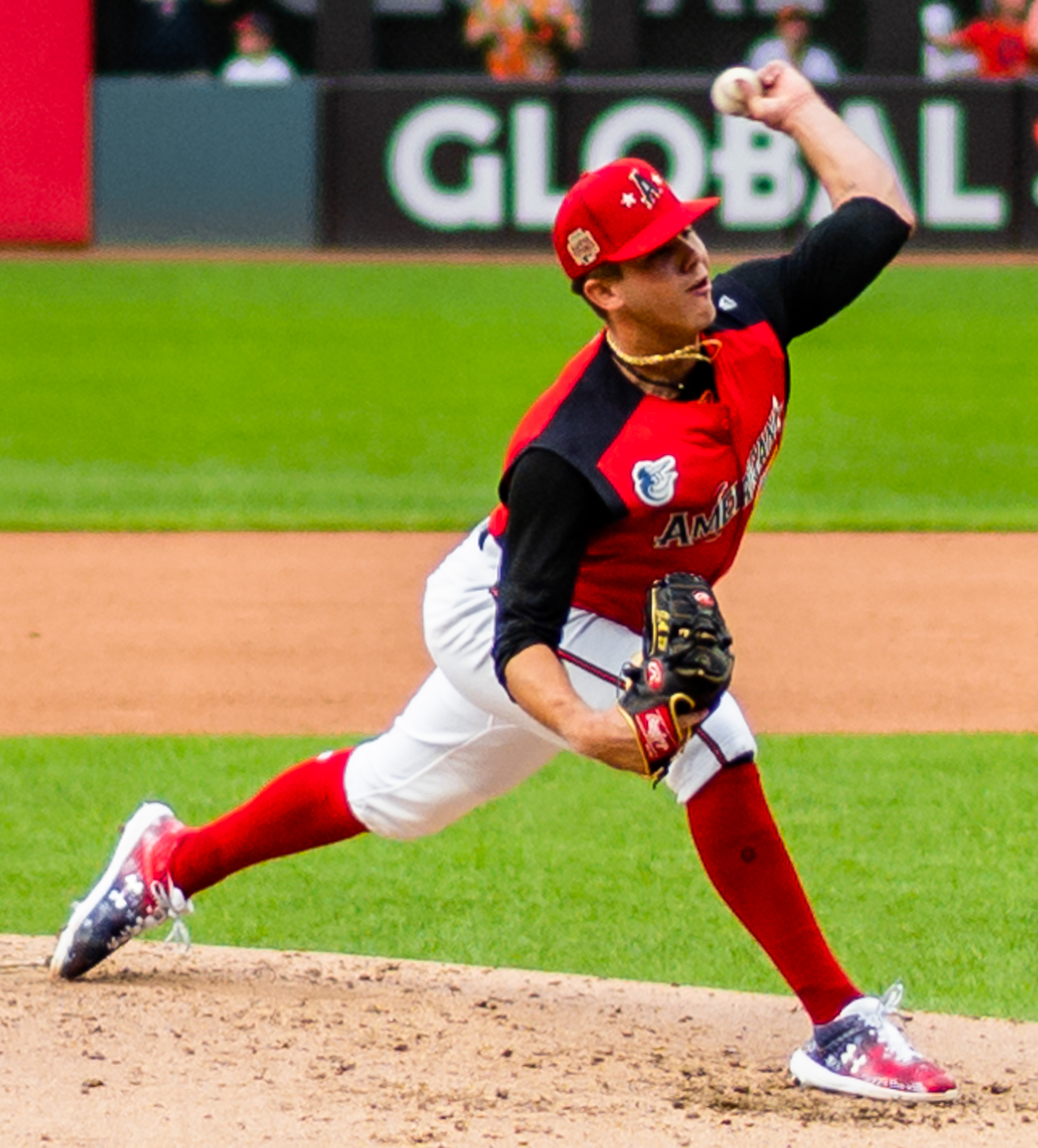
Hall pitching in the 2019 All-Star Futures Game

Hall spent 2019 with the Frederick Keys, pitching to a 4–5 record with a 3.46 ERA over 19 games (17 starts), striking out 116 (5th in the league) and walking 54 batters (tied for 4th in the Carolina League) over 80 2/3 innings. He was named to the 2019 All-Star Futures Game. He did not play in a game in 2020 due to the cancellation of the minor league season because of the COVID-19 pandemic. In 2021, Hall pitched for the Bowie Baysox, but threw only 31 2/3 innings before his season was ended prematurely due to an elbow injury. Hall was selected to the 40-man roster following the season on November 19, 2021.

After starting the 2022 season on Baltimore's development list, the Orioles promoted Hall to the Norfolk Tides in May, with whom he was 3-7 with a 4.70 ERA . The Orioles promoted him to the major leagues on August 13 to make his major league debut. He was optioned to Triple-A the following day, with the intention to work as a relief pitcher while in Norfolk. On September 30, Hall earned his first career save after tossing a perfect ninth inning in a 2–1 victory over the New York Yankees. Hall earned his first career victory in the first game of a doubleheader against the Toronto Blue Jays on October 5. After pitching a scoreless eighth inning, Terrin Vavra hit a three–run homer to propel Baltimore to victory, and Hall to his first win. Hall appeared in 11 games for Baltimore in his rookie campaign, posting a 1-1 record and 5.93 ERA with 17 hits, six walks, and 19 strikeouts in 13 2/3 innings pitched.

Hall was optioned to Triple-A Norfolk to begin the 2023 season. He was promoted to the major leagues on August 26 following an injury to closer Félix Bautista. In 18 relief appearances for Baltimore, Hall registered a 3.26 ERA with 23 strikeouts across 19 1/3 innings pitched.

=== Milwaukee Brewers ===
On February 1, 2024, the Orioles traded Hall and Joey Ortiz to the Milwaukee Brewers in exchange for right-handed pitcher Corbin Burnes. After four starts, he was placed on the injured list with a sprained left knee on April 21. Hall was transferred to the 60–day injured list on June 8. He was activated on August 11. In 13 games (7 starts) for Milwaukee, Hall posted a 1-2 record and 5.02 ERA with 48 hits, 44 strikeouts, and 21 walks over 43 innings pitched with a WHIP of 1.605.

On March 5, 2025, Hall was placed on the 60-day injured list after suffering a lat strain that sidelined him throughout spring training. He was activated on May 26 and would receive the win that day for the Brewers, pitching 2 1/3 innings and giving up one run. Hall would continue in this role as a long relief pitcher out of the bullpen for the Brewers, often pitching more than one inning per game. Hall suffered an oblique injury in August and was placed on the injured list for the second time in the season. Hall did come back in the final week of the regular season, pitching in relief against the Cincinnati Reds on September 28. Despite Hall posting a 3.49 ERA in 38 2/3 innings of work, the Brewers chose to not include him on the roster for either of their playoff series.

Statistically, Hall had the best season of his career in 2026. While pitching in a career-high 61 1/3 innings, he posted a career-best 1.91 ERA, 1.043 WHIP, and 4.3 H/9. His ERA+ for the season was 220 (with 100 being league average), indicating he was twice as good as the average pitcher. On June 4, 2026 Hall left a game against the San Francisco Giants with a left pectoral injury, which would keep him on the injured list until August 2. Upon returning, Hall was even more dominant than he had been in the first half of the season, allowing just six runs in his final 30 1/3 innings (a 1.78 ERA).

Hall would make his 2026 postseason debut on October 3 in Game 1 of the NLDS against the San Diego Padres. He gave up two walks in his one inning of work, but got out of the inning with no runs allowed. Hall appeared again in Game 3, this time accruing one hit and one strikeout, but again allowing no runs. His dominance continued in his team's 4-0 sweep on the Los Angeles Dodgers in the NLCS. Hall gave up just one hit and accrued two strikeouts in a combined three innings pitched against the Dodgers between Game 1 (2/3 IP) and Game 3 (2 1/3 IP) of the Championship Series.

== Personal life ==
Hall and his wife, Hannah, were married in December 2024 in Mexico.
