= Garrett Stallings =

American baseball player (born 1997)

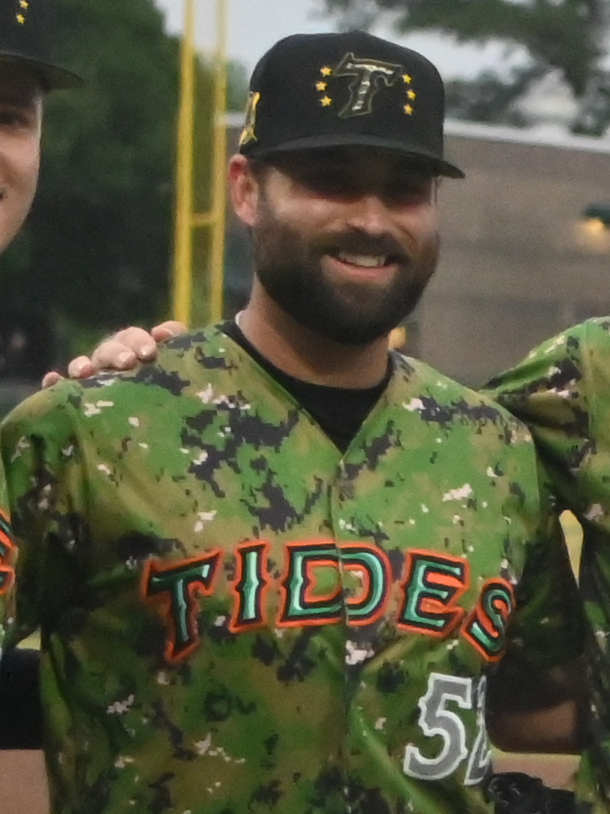
- Stallings with the Norfolk Tides in 2024

Milwaukee Brewers – No. 31
- Pitcher
- Born: August 8, 1997 (age 29); Chesapeake, Virginia, U.S.
- Bats: Right Throws: Right

MLB debut
- July 2, 2026, for the Milwaukee Brewers

MLB statistics (through September 11, 2026)
- Win–loss record: 0–0
- Earned run average: 0.00
- Strikeouts: 11
- Stats at Baseball Reference

Teams
- Milwaukee Brewers (2026–present)

Garrett Herbert Stallings (born August 8, 1997) is an American professional baseball pitcher for the Milwaukee Brewers of Major League Baseball (MLB).

== Amateur career ==
A native of Chesapeake, Virginia, Stallings attended Grassfield High School and went on to play college baseball for the Tennessee Volunteers from 2017 to 2019. In 2018, he played collegiate summer baseball with the Harwich Mariners of the Cape Cod Baseball League.

== Professional career ==
=== Baltimore Orioles ===
Stallings was selected by the Los Angeles Angels in the fifth round (151st overall) of the 2019 Major League Baseball draft. Stallings signed with the Angels on June 26, 2019, but did not appear for the organization before the conclusion of the year. He did not play in a game in 2020 due to the cancellation of the minor league season because of the COVID-19 pandemic.

On December 2, 2020, Stallings and Jean Pinto were traded to the Baltimore Orioles in exchange for Jose Iglesias. Stallings made his professional debut in 2021, splitting the year between the High-A Aberdeen IronBirds and Double-A Bowie Baysox. In 23 appearances (19 starts) for the two affiliates, he accumulated a 10-6 record and 4.67 ERA with 96 strikeouts over 106 innings of work.

Stallings returned to Bowie for the 2022 campaign, registering a 6-10 record and 6.28 ERA with 124 strikeouts across 119 innings pitched. He split the 2023 season between Bowie and the Triple-A Norfolk Tides. Stallings pitched in 28 games (including 19 starts) for both affiliates, posting a cumulative 11-6 record and 5.16 ERA with 133 strikeouts across 127 1/3 innings pitched.

Stallings was assigned to Triple-A Norfolk to begin the 2024 season, where he recorded a 5.67 ERA with 25 strikeouts in 27 innings pitched across 11 appearances (including four starts).

=== Milwaukee Brewers ===
On May 25, 2024, Stallings was traded to the Milwaukee Brewers in exchange for Thyago Vieira and Anueris Rodríguez. He spent the remainder of the year with the Triple-A Nashville Sounds, compiling a 1-2 record and 4.27 ERA with 42 strikeouts and one save over 17 games. Stallings returned to Nashville for the 2025 season, compiling a 5-3 record and 3.99 ERA with 72 strikeouts in 99 1/3 innings pitched across 30 appearances (15 starts).

Stallings was assigned to Triple-A Nashville to begin the 2026 season, where he posted a 3-3 record and 3.45 ERA with 59 strikeouts across his first 16 appearances (including 12 starts). On June 30, 2026, Stallings was selected to the 40-man roster and promoted to the major leagues for the first time. On July 2, Stallings made his major league debut and he recorded his first Major League strikeout in a 7–2 loss to the Cincinnati Reds. He finished the season with an ERA of 0.00 with 14 innings pitched across 6 relief appearances.
