= Blake Perkins =

American baseball player (born 1996)

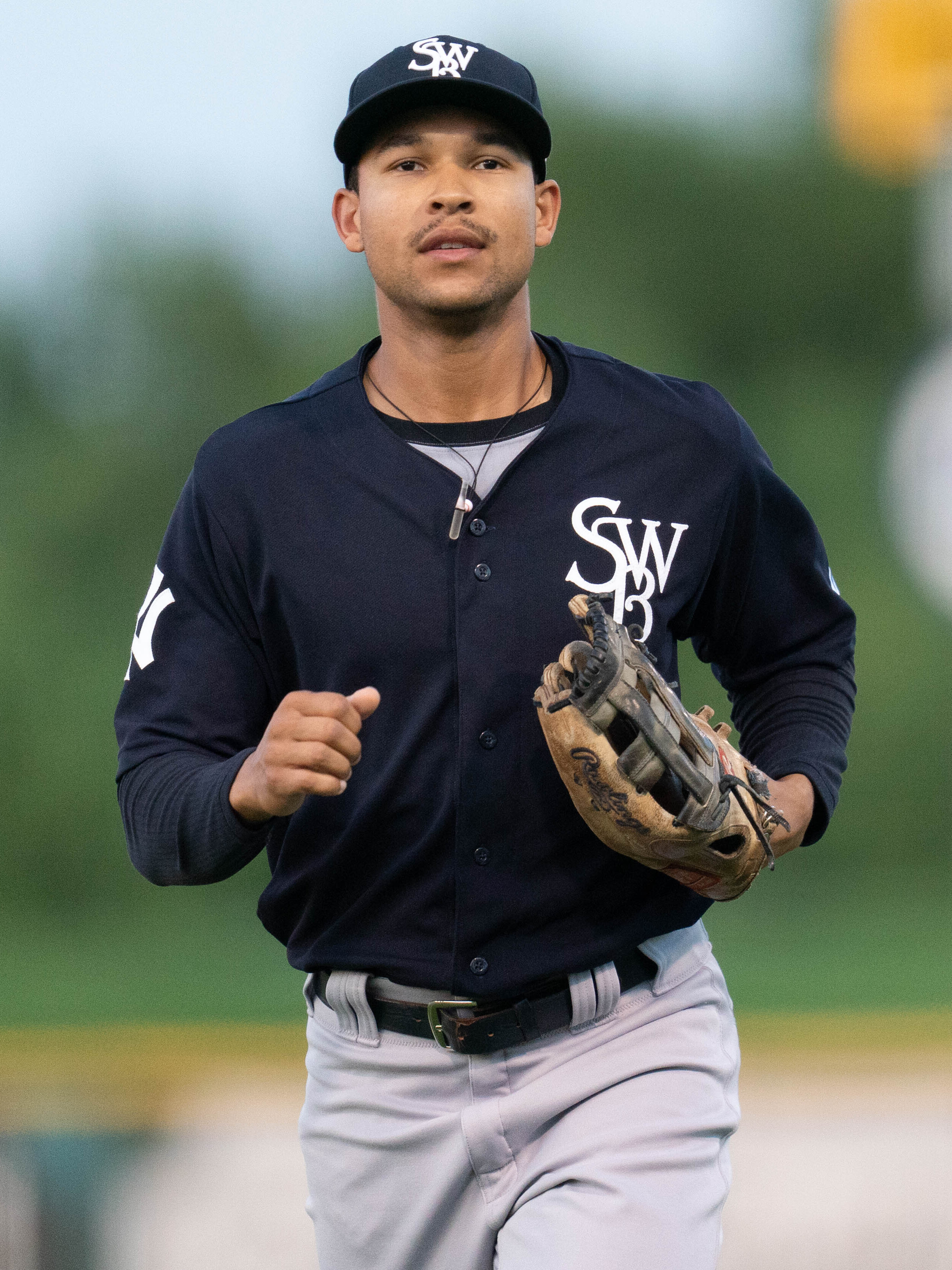
- Perkins in 2022 with the Scranton/Wilkes-Barre RailRiders

Cleveland Guardians
- Outfielder
- Born: September 10, 1996 (age 30); Litchfield Park, Arizona, U.S.
- Bats: Switch Throws: Right

MLB debut
- April 19, 2023, for the Milwaukee Brewers

MLB statistics (through 2026 season)
- Batting average: .223
- Home runs: 14
- Runs batted in: 93
- Stats at Baseball Reference

Teams
- Milwaukee Brewers (2023–2026)

Blake Alexander Perkins (born September 10, 1996) is an American professional baseball outfielder for the Cleveland Guardians of Major League Baseball (MLB). He made his MLB debut in 2023 with the Milwaukee Brewers.

== Career ==
=== Washington Nationals ===
Perkins attended Verrado High School in Buckeye, Arizona. The Washington Nationals drafted Perkins in the second round, with the 69th overall selection, of the 2015 Major League Baseball draft. Although an Arizona State University Sun Devils commit, Perkins chose to sign with the Nationals for an $800,000 bonus.

After signing, Perkins made his professional debut with the Gulf Coast League Nationals where he hit .211 with one home run and 12 RBI in 49 games. At the conclusion of his rookie season, the Nationals asked Perkins to work on becoming a switch hitter. Perkins, a natural right-handed hitter, entered his next season adjusting to the steep learning curve of hitting left-handed for the bulk of his at-bats. He spent a majority of 2016 with the Auburn Doubledays, slashing .233/.318/.281 with one home run, 16 RBI, and ten stolen bases in 59 games. He also played in seven games for the Hagerstown Suns at the end of the season. In 2017, Perkins was Hagerstown's starting center fielder and usual leadoff hitter, sharing an outfield with the likes of top Nationals prospects Juan Soto and Daniel Johnson. Perkins was ranked by MLB Pipeline as the Nationals' 11th-best prospect entering the 2018 season, in which he started the year with the Potomac Nationals. Perkins batted .234 with one home run, 21 RBIs, and 12 stolen bases through 65 games at the new level.

=== Kansas City Royals ===
On June 18, 2018, during the Carolina League All-Star Break, Perkins was traded to the Kansas City Royals along with Kelvin Gutiérrez and Yohanse Morel in exchange for Royals reliever Kelvin Herrera. He was assigned to the Wilmington Blue Rocks. In 64 games for the Blue Rocks, he batted .240 with two home runs, 18 RBI, and 17 stolen bases. He returned to the Blue Rocks to begin 2019 and was promoted to the Northwest Arkansas Naturals in August. Over 122 games between both teams, he hit .224/.330/.347 with eight home runs, 34 RBI, and 22 stolen bases.

Perkins did not play in a game in 2020 due to the cancellation of the minor league season because of the COVID-19 pandemic. In 2021, Perkins returned to the Naturals, playing in 72 games and slashing .202/.319/.332 with seven home runs, 30 RBI, and nine stolen bases.

=== New York Yankees ===
On December 16, 2021, Perkins signed a minor league contract with the New York Yankees organization. After not seeing the results he wanted as a switch hitter, Perkins had decided to go back to hitting right-handed full-time. The Yankees asked him to reconsider, and Perkins entered the season committed to continuing to switch-hit. Perkins appeared in 101 games split between the Double-A Somerset Patriots and Triple-A Scranton/Wilkes-Barre RailRiders, hitting a cumulative .246/.357/.456 with 15 home runs, 50 RBI, and 21 stolen bases. He elected free agency following the season on November 10, 2022.

=== Milwaukee Brewers ===
On November 23, 2022, Perkins signed a one-year, major league contract with the Milwaukee Brewers. Perkins was optioned to the Triple-A Nashville Sounds to begin the 2023 season. On April 19, 2023, Perkins was promoted to the major leagues for the first time after Garrett Mitchell suffered a shoulder injury. In 67 games for Milwaukee during his rookie campaign, Perkins batted .217/.325/.350 with four home runs, 20 RBI, and five stolen bases.

Perkins made 121 appearances for the Brewers during the 2024 season, slashing .240/.316/.332 with career-highs in home runs (6), RBI (43), and stolen bases (23).

On February 22, 2025, it was announced that Perkins would miss 3-4 weeks after sustaining a fracture in his shin after fouling a ball of himself during batting practice. He was transferred to the 60-day injured list on April 26. Perkins was activated for his season debut on July 13. He made 54 total appearances for the Brewers during the regular season, slashing .226/.298/.348 with three home runs, 19 RBI, and seven stolen bases.

Perkins was optioned to Triple-A Nashville to begin the 2026 season. He made 55 appearances for Milwaukee, slashing .157/.250/.258 with one home run, 11 RBI, and three stolen bases.

=== Cleveland Guardians ===
On August 1, 2026, the Brewers traded Perkins and Craig Yoho to the Cleveland Guardians in exchange for Codi Heuer and Bo Naylor.

== Personal life ==
Perkins' wife, Falyn, announced on Instagram in July 2026 that they were expecting their first child.
