= Shane Drohan =

American baseball player (born 1999)

Milwaukee Brewers – No. 55
- Pitcher
- Born: January 7, 1999 (age 27); Fort Lauderdale, Florida, U.S.
- Bats: Left Throws: Left

MLB debut
- April 8, 2026, for the Milwaukee Brewers

MLB statistics (through 2026 season)
- Win–loss record: 7–5
- Earned run average: 4.19
- Strikeouts: 125
- Stats at Baseball Reference

Teams
- Milwaukee Brewers (2026–present)

Career highlights and awards
- World Series champion (2026)

Shane Liam Drohan (born January 7, 1999) is an American professional baseball pitcher for the Milwaukee Brewers of Major League Baseball (MLB). He made his MLB debut in 2026.

== Amateur career ==
Drohan attended Cardinal Newman High School in West Palm Beach, Florida. He was drafted by the Philadelphia Phillies in the 23rd round of the 2017 Major League Baseball draft. He did not sign with the Phillies and played college baseball at Florida State University. In 2019, he played collegiate summer baseball with the Falmouth Commodores of the Cape Cod Baseball League.

== Professional career ==
=== Boston Red Sox ===
The Boston Red Sox selected Drohan in the fifth round (148th overall) of the 2020 MLB draft. Drohan made his professional debut in 2021 with the Salem Red Sox. He played 2022 with the Greenville Drive and Double-A Portland Sea Dogs and started 2023 with Portland. In 2023 between Portland and the Worcester Red Sox he was 10-7 with a 5.05 ERA, with a WHIP of 1.577.

On December 6, 2023, the Chicago White Sox selected Drohan from the Red Sox in the Rule 5 draft. On February 22, 2024, Drohan underwent a nerve decompression procedure on his left shoulder, and was placed on the 60–day injured list to begin the season. On June 9, Drohan was activated from the injured list and subsequently designated for assignment. On June 12, Drohan was returned to the Red Sox organization. In 2024. between four minor league teams he was 2-0 with a 7.71 ERA .

In 2025, Drohan made 15 appearances (14 starts) split between the High-A Greenville Drive and Triple-A Worcester Red Sox, for whom he posted a 5-2 record and 3.00 ERA with 77 strikeouts over 54 innings of work. On November 18, 2025, the Red Sox added Drohan to their 40-man roster to protect him from the Rule 5 draft.

=== Milwaukee Brewers ===
On February 9, 2026, the Red Sox traded Drohan, Kyle Harrison, and David Hamilton to the Milwaukee Brewers in exchange for Caleb Durbin, Andruw Monasterio, Anthony Seigler, and a compensation round draft pick in the 2026 MLB draft. He was optioned to the Triple-A Nashville Sounds to begin the regular season. On April 6, Drohan was promoted to the major leagues for the first time. On April 30, he recorded his first career win, allowing one run over four innings of relief against the Arizona Diamondbacks.

== See also ==
- Rule 5 draft results
