= Chad Patrick =

American baseball player (born 1998)

Milwaukee Brewers – No. 39
- Pitcher
- Born: August 14, 1998 (age 28); Crown Point, Indiana, U.S.
- Bats: Right Throws: Right

MLB debut
- March 29, 2025, for the Milwaukee Brewers

MLB statistics (through 2026 season)
- Win–loss record: 12–12
- Earned run average: 3.47
- Strikeouts: 220
- Stats at Baseball Reference

Teams
- Milwaukee Brewers (2025–present)

Career highlights and awards
- World Series champion (2026)

Chandler Allen Patrick (born August 14, 1998) is an American professional baseball pitcher for the Milwaukee Brewers of Major League Baseball (MLB). He made his MLB debut in 2025.

== Career ==
=== College ===
Patrick played college baseball at Purdue University Northwest. In 2020 and 2021, he played summer league baseball for the Traverse City Pit Spitters of the Northwoods League.

=== Arizona Diamondbacks ===
He was drafted by the Arizona Diamondbacks in the fourth round, with the 107th overall selection, of the 2021 Major League Baseball draft. He made his professional debut with the Single-A Visalia Rawhide. Patrick split the 2022 season between the rookie-level Arizona Complex League Diamondbacks, Visalia, and the High-A Hillsboro Hops, posting an aggregate 5–2 record and 3.30 ERA with 54 strikeouts across 13 total games. Patrick began the 2023 campaign with the Double-A Amarillo Sod Poodles, registering a 4–7 record and 4.71 ERA with 90 strikeouts in 91 2/3 innings pitched across 19 starts.

=== Oakland Athletics ===
On July 31, 2023, the Diamondbacks traded Patrick to the Oakland Athletics in exchange for Jace Peterson. He spent the remainder of the year with the Double-A Midland RockHounds and Triple-A Las Vegas Aviators. Patrick struggled to an 8.44 ERA in 2 starts for Midland, and struggled to a 0–3 record and 7.89 ERA in 6 games for Las Vegas.

=== Milwaukee Brewers ===
On November 15, 2023, the Athletics traded Patrick to the Milwaukee Brewers in exchange for Abraham Toro. Patrick made 26 appearances (24 starts) for the Triple–A Nashville Sounds in 2024, compiling a 14–1 record and 2.90 ERA with 145 strikeouts across 136 1/3 innings pitched, leading the league in wins and strikeouts. Following the season, Patrick was named the International League pitcher of the year. On November 20, 2024, the Brewers added Patrick to their 40-man roster to protect him from the Rule 5 draft.

Patrick was optioned to Triple-A Nashville to begin the 2025 season. However, following multiple injuries, Patrick was added to Milwaukee's Opening Day roster on March 26. He made his debut on March 29. On April 1, Patrick made his first career MLB start, in which he pitched 4 2/3 innings and earned 5 strikeouts, and leading the team to its first win of the season. On April 6, Patrick recorded his first career win after tossing 5 1/3 innings of one-run ball against the Cincinnati Reds. As the 2025 season went on, Patrick saw some success but teams eventually began to catch up to Patrick's primary pitches (a cutter, four-seam, and sinker—all variations on a fastball). Without a quality off-speed pitch to complement the fastballs, the Brewers' manager Pat Murphy said in June that he believed Patrick's pitch mix was affecting his performance. In Patrick's subsequent start, he used a slider 24 times to good effect. In 2025 Patrick appeared in 27 games, 23 of which were starts, and posted a 3.54 ERA.
