= Abner Uribe =

Dominican baseball player (born 2000)

- Uribe during the 2026 World Series victory parade

Milwaukee Brewers – No. 45
- Pitcher
- Born: June 20, 2000 (age 26); Santo Domingo, Dominican Republic
- Bats: Right Throws: Right

MLB debut
- July 8, 2023, for the Milwaukee Brewers

MLB statistics (through 2026 season)
- Win–loss record: 12–7
- Earned run average: 2.20
- Strikeouts: 205
- Stats at Baseball Reference

Teams
- Milwaukee Brewers (2023–present)

Career highlights and awards
- World Series champion (2026)
Medals
Men's baseball
Representing Dominican Republic
World Baseball Classic
Bronze medal – third place	2026 Miami	Team

Abner Brismaury Uribe (born June 20, 2000) is a Dominican professional baseball pitcher for the Milwaukee Brewers of Major League Baseball (MLB). He made his MLB debut in 2023.

== Career ==
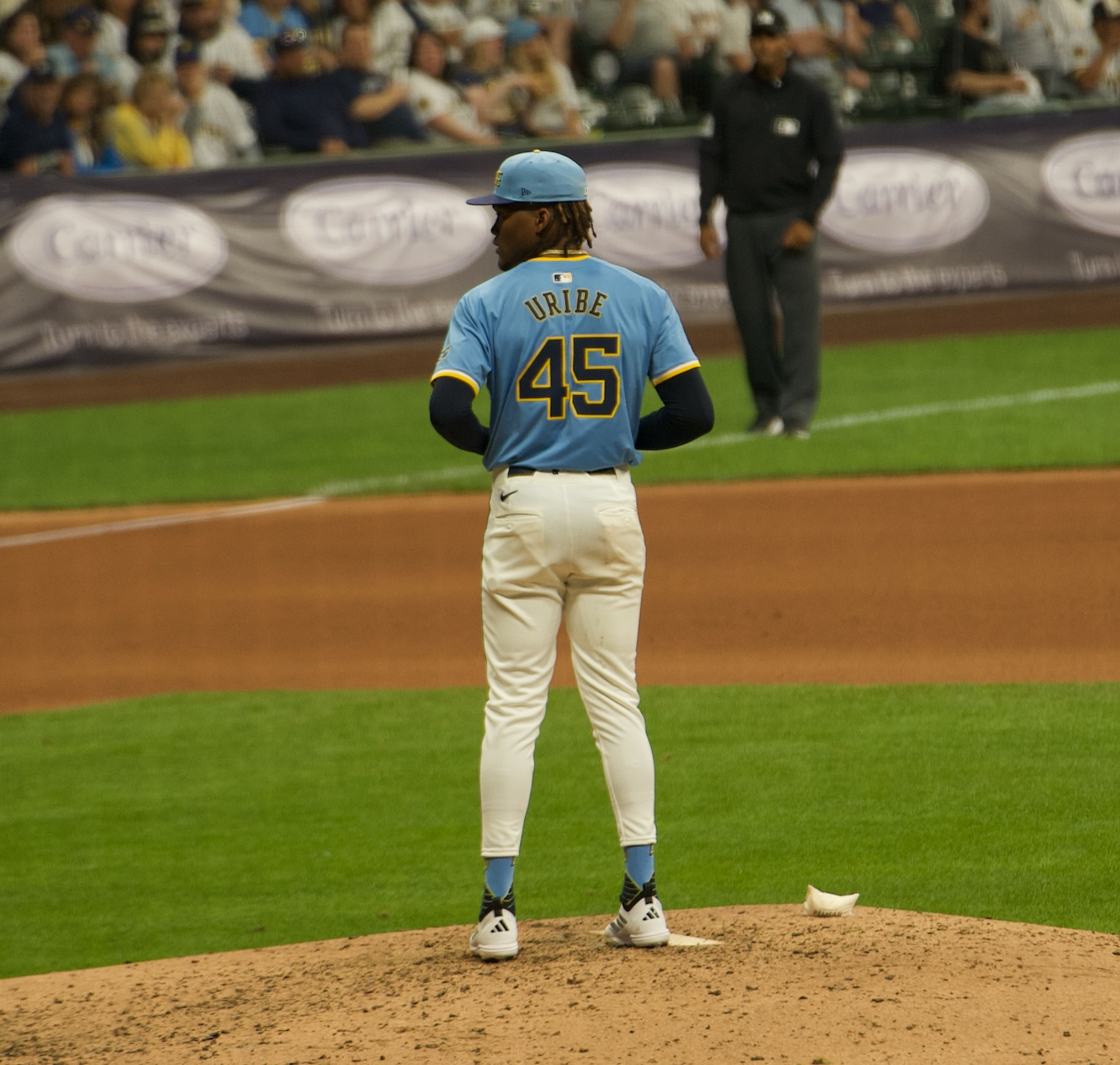
Uribe playing with the Brewers

Uribe signed with the Milwaukee Brewers as an international free agent on July 2, 2018. He made his professional debut that season with the Dominican Summer League Brewers. He played 2019 with the Arizona League Brewers and the Rocky Mountain Vibes, with whom he was a combined 3-2 with a 10.61 ERA in 9 1/3 innings.

Uribe did not play in a game in 2020 due to the cancellation of the minor league season because of the COVID-19 pandemic. He returned in 2021 to pitch for the Carolina Mudcats and after the season played in the Arizona Fall League. Uribe pitched in only two games in 2022 for the Biloxi Shuckers due to a torn meniscus in his right knee. He played in the Arizona Fall League for the second consecutive year after the season. On November 15, 2022, the Brewers added Uribe to their 40–man roster to protect him from the Rule 5 draft.

Uribe was optioned to Double-A Biloxi to begin the 2023 season. In 22 games split between Biloxi and the Triple–A Nashville Sounds, he accumulated a 1.96 ERA with 41 strikeouts and 7 saves in 23 innings pitched. On July 8, 2023, Uribe was promoted to the major leagues for the first time. In 32 relief outings during his rookie campaign, Uribe compiled a 1.76 ERA with 39 strikeouts across 30 2/3 innings pitched.

In a game against the Tampa Bay Rays on April 30, 2024, Uribe was involved in an altercation with Rays outfielder Jose Siri. In a contentious game which manager Pat Murphy and teammate Freddy Peralta had already been ejected from, an otherwise routine ground ball play at first led to Uribe and Siri exchanging words. The situation became suddenly chaotic when Uribe threw a punch at Siri, igniting a benches-clearing brawl. Both Uribe and Siri were ejected for their parts in the brawl. Uribe received a six game suspension. The suspension was later reduced to four games and was served during the Brewers first four games of the 2025 regular season. In 14 appearances in 2024, he struggled to a 6.91 ERA with three saves and 14 strikeouts. On July 18, Uribe announced that he had undergone season–ending knee surgery.

Uribe finished the 2026 regular season for the Brewers with a 1.97 ERA, six saves, and 62 strikeouts. He was a core piece of the Brewers' run to win the 2026 World Series against the Tampa Bay Rays. Uribe led the team in playoff pitching appearances with 11, posting an ERA of 1.54, striking out 11 in 11 2/3 innings. In the World Series, he appeared four times and allowed zero runs, including collecting two seventh inning outs in the decisive Game 5.
