= 2025 Milwaukee Brewers season =

2025 Milwaukee Brewers
- National League Central champions
- League: National League
- Division: Central
- Ballpark: American Family Field
- City: Milwaukee, Wisconsin, United States
- Record: 97–65 (.599)
- Divisional place: 1st
- Owners: Mark Attanasio
- General managers: Matt Arnold
- Managers: Pat Murphy
- Television: FanDuel Sports Network Wisconsin (Brian Anderson, Bill Schroeder, Jeff Levering, Tim Dillard, Chris Singleton, Vinny Rottino, Jeff Cirillo, Sophia Minnaert, Dario Melendez, Stephen Watson); Telemundo Wisconsin (Spanish-language coverage, Sunday home games; Hector Molina, Kevin Holden)
- Radio: 620 WTMJ; Milwaukee Brewers Radio Network (Jeff Levering, Lane Grindle, Josh Maurer, Jerry Augustine)
- Stats: ESPN.com; Baseball Reference

The 2025 Milwaukee Brewers season was the 56th season for the Brewers in Milwaukee, their 28th in the National League, and their 57th overall.

The Brewers' home opener on March 31, 2025, an 11–1 loss to the Kansas City Royals, was the team's worst loss in a home opener since 2015.

On August 16, with a win over their division rival Cincinnati Reds, the Brewers became the first team since the 2022 Seattle Mariners to reach 14 consecutive wins in the regular season. The Brewers finished the season with a 97–65 record, setting a new franchise mark for wins in a season, until the 2026 season. Milwaukee also owned the best record in MLB, winning one more game than the Philadelphia Phillies.

The Brewers became the first team to clinch a playoff berth by clinching their seventh postseason berth in the last eight seasons (third consecutive) on September 13, won the National League Central and earned a first-round bye on September 21, completing a 6.5-game comeback against the rival Cubs, and then earned home-field advantage throughout the MLB postseason after the Philadelphia Phillies were defeated by the Minnesota Twins on September 27.

They faced the Chicago Cubs in the Division Series, marking the first I-94 rivalry matchup in postseason history, and defeated them in five games to advance to the NLCS. In that series the Brewers were swept by the defending and eventual repeat World Series champion Los Angeles Dodgers, despite completing a 6–0 sweep in the regular season themselves. It was their first time being swept in a postseason series longer than three games, scoring only one run in each of their four losses. The Brewers however would get revenge the next year by sweeping the Dodgers themselves.

The Milwaukee Brewers drew an average home attendance of 32,717, which ranked 12th in the MLB in average attendance.

== Season standings ==
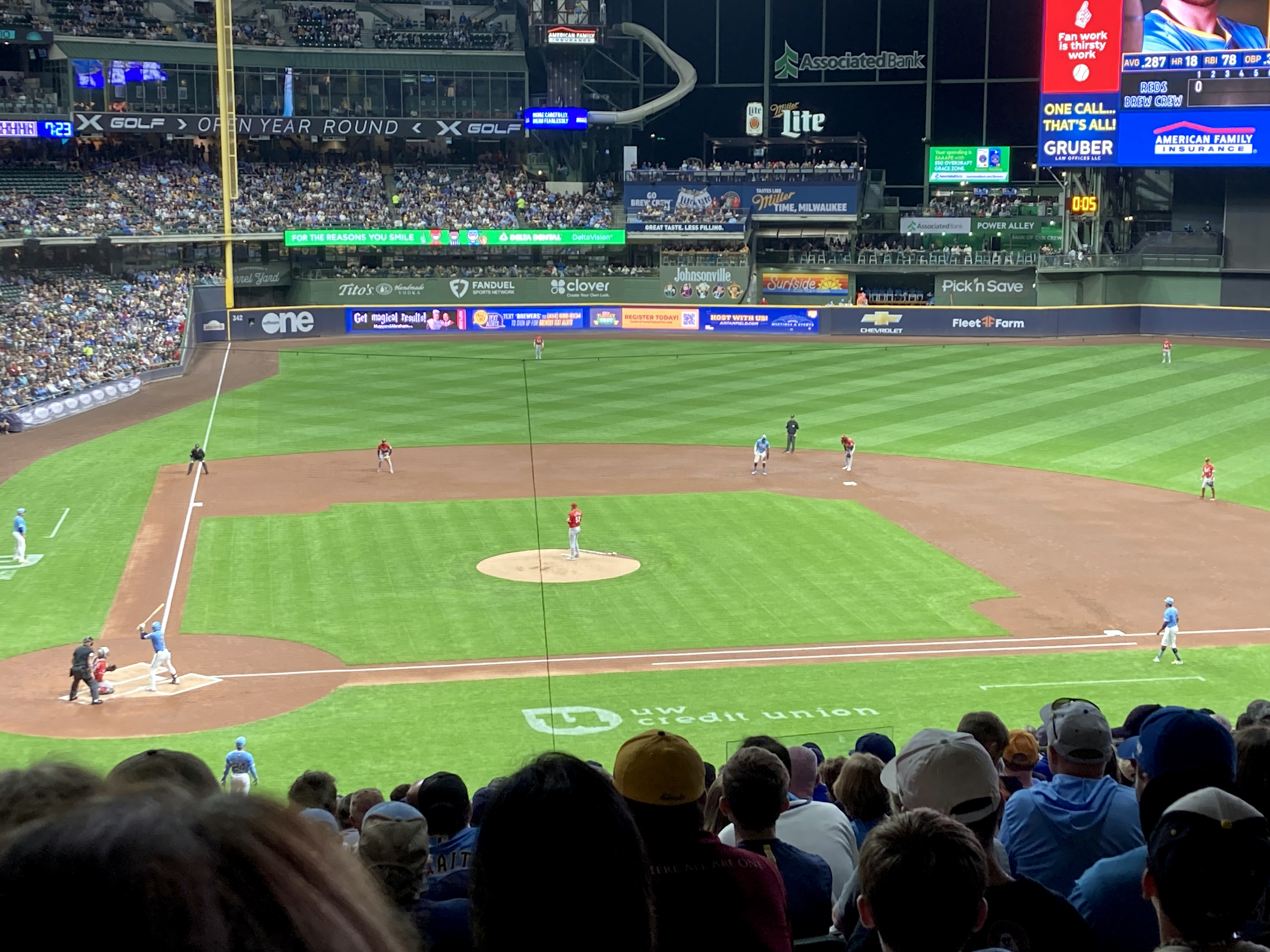
The Brewers playing the Cincinnati Reds on September 26

=== National League Central ===
NL Central
Team	W	L	Pct.	GB	Home	Road
Milwaukee Brewers	97	65	.599	—	52‍–‍29	45‍–‍36
Chicago Cubs	92	70	.568	5	50‍–‍31	42‍–‍39
Cincinnati Reds	83	79	.512	14	45‍–‍36	38‍–‍43
St. Louis Cardinals	78	84	.481	19	44‍–‍37	34‍–‍47
Pittsburgh Pirates	71	91	.438	26	44‍–‍37	27‍–‍54

=== National League Wild Card ===
Division leaders
Team	W	L	Pct.
Milwaukee Brewers	97	65	.599
Philadelphia Phillies	96	66	.593
Los Angeles Dodgers	93	69	.574

Wild Card teams (Top 3 teams qualify for postseason)
Team	W	L	Pct.	GB
Chicago Cubs	92	70	.568	+9
San Diego Padres	90	72	.556	+7
Cincinnati Reds	83	79	.512	—
New York Mets	83	79	.512	—
San Francisco Giants	81	81	.500	2
Arizona Diamondbacks	80	82	.494	3
Miami Marlins	79	83	.488	4
St. Louis Cardinals	78	84	.481	5
Atlanta Braves	76	86	.469	7
Pittsburgh Pirates	71	91	.438	12
Washington Nationals	66	96	.407	17
Colorado Rockies	43	119	.265	40

=== Record vs. opponents ===
==== Record vs. National League ====
2025 National League record Source: MLB Standings Grid – 2025
Team	AZ	ATL	CHC	CIN	COL	LAD	MIA	MIL	NYM	PHI	PIT	SD	SF	STL	WSH	AL
Arizona	—	4–2	3–4	2–4	8–5	6–7	3–3	4–3	3–3	3–3	2–4	5–8	7–6	3–3	2–4	25–23
Atlanta	2–4	—	2–4	5–2	4–2	1–5	8–5	2–4	8–5	5–8	2–4	1–6	1–5	4–2	9–4	22–26
Chicago	4–3	4–2	—	5–8	5–1	4–3	4–2	7–6	2–4	2–4	10–3	3–3	1–5	8–5	3–3	30–18
Cincinnati	4–2	2–5	8–5	—	5–1	1–5	3–4	5–8	4–2	3–3	7–6	4–2	3–3	6–7	2–4	26–22
Colorado	5–8	2–4	1–5	1–5	—	2–11	3–3	2–4	0–6	0–7	2–4	3–10	2–11	4–2	4–3	12–36
Los Angeles	7–6	5–1	3–4	5–1	11–2	—	5–1	0–6	3–4	2–4	2–4	9–4	9–4	2–4	3–3	27–21
Miami	3–3	5–8	2–4	4–3	3–3	1–5	—	3–3	7–6	4–9	4–3	3–3	4–2	3–3	7–6	26–22
Milwaukee	3–4	4–2	6–7	8–5	4–2	6–0	3–3	—	4–2	4–2	10–3	2–4	2–5	7–6	6–0	28–20
New York	3–3	5–8	4–2	2–4	6–0	4–3	6–7	2–4	—	7–6	2–4	2–4	4–2	5–2	7–6	24–24
Philadelphia	3–3	8–5	4–2	3–3	7–0	4–2	9–4	2–4	6–7	—	3–3	3–3	3–4	2–4	8–5	31–17
Pittsburgh	4–2	4–2	3–10	6–7	4–2	4–2	3–4	3–10	4–2	3–3	—	1–5	4–2	7–6	4–3	17–31
San Diego	8–5	6–1	3–3	2–4	10–3	4–9	3–3	4–2	4–2	3–3	5–1	—	10–3	4–3	4–2	20–28
San Francisco	6–7	5–1	5–1	3–3	11–2	4–9	2–4	5–2	2–4	4–3	2–4	3–10	—	2–4	3–3	24–24
St. Louis	3–3	2–4	5–8	7–6	2–4	4–2	3–3	6–7	2–5	4–2	6–7	3–4	4–2	—	5–1	22–26
Washington	4–2	4–9	3–3	4–2	3–4	3–3	6–7	0–6	6–7	5–8	3–4	2–4	3–3	1–5	—	19–29

Updated with the results of all games through September 28, 2025.

==== Record vs. American League ====
2025 National League record vs. American League Source: MLB Standings
Team	ATH	BAL	BOS	CWS	CLE	DET	HOU	KC	LAA	MIN	NYY	SEA	TB	TEX	TOR
Arizona	2–1	2–1	2–1	2–1	2–1	0–3	0–3	1–2	1–2	2–1	2–1	3–0	1–2	4–2	1–2
Atlanta	1–2	0–3	3–3	2–1	3–0	3–0	1–2	1–2	1–2	3–0	1–2	1–2	1–2	0–3	1–2
Chicago	3–0	2–1	2–1	5–1	3–0	1–2	1–2	1–2	3–0	1–2	2–1	1–2	2–1	2–1	1–2
Cincinnati	0–3	2–1	1–2	1–2	5–1	2–1	1–2	2–1	2–1	2–1	2–1	1–2	3–0	1–2	1–2
Colorado	1–2	1–2	0–3	1–2	1–2	0–3	2–4	0–3	2–1	2–1	1–2	0–3	1–2	0–3	0–3
Los Angeles	2–1	1–2	1–2	3–0	2–1	3–0	0–3	2–1	0–6	2–1	2–1	3–0	2–1	2–1	2–1
Miami	1–2	2–1	1–2	1–2	1–2	2–1	1–2	2–1	2–1	2–1	3–0	1–2	3–3	3–0	1–2
Milwaukee	2–1	2–1	3–0	2–1	1–2	2–1	2–1	2–1	3–0	4–2	0–3	2–1	1–2	0–3	2–1
New York	2–1	1–2	1–2	2–1	0–3	2–1	1–2	2–1	3–0	1–2	3–3	2–1	0–3	1–2	3–0
Philadelphia	2–1	2–1	2–1	1–2	2–1	2–1	0–3	2–1	1–2	2–1	2–1	3–0	3–0	3–0	4–2
Pittsburgh	2–1	0–3	2–1	0–3	0–3	4–2	1–2	0–3	2–1	1–2	1–2	0–3	1–2	1–2	2–1
San Diego	2–1	0–3	2–1	2–1	3–0	1–2	1–2	2–1	2–1	1–2	1–2	1–5	0–3	2–1	0–3
San Francisco	5–1	2–1	2–1	1–2	1–2	0–3	3–0	1–2	1–2	0–3	2–1	3–0	1–2	2–1	0–3
St. Louis	2–1	2–1	0–3	3–0	3–0	1–2	2–1	3–3	1–2	3–0	0–3	0–3	1–2	1–2	0–3
Washington	1–2	5–1	0–3	1–2	1–2	2–1	1–2	1–2	2–1	2–1	0–3	2–1	0–3	1–2	0–3

Updated with the results of all games through September 28, 2025.

== Roster ==
2025 Milwaukee Brewers
Roster
Pitchers: 33 Tyler Alexander; 56 Grant Anderson; 26 Aaron Ashby; 32 Aaron Civale; 65 Nestor Cortes; 59 Erick Fedde; 54 Robert Gasser; 37 DL Hall; 43 Logan Henderson; 52 Bryan Hudson; 47 Jared Koenig; 50 Easton McGee; 25 Nick Mears; 29 Trevor Megill; 55 Shelby Miller; 32,33 Jacob Misiorowski; 36 Tobias Myers; 39 Chad Patrick; 31 Joel Payamps; 59 Elvis Peguero; 51 Freddy Peralta; 46 Quinn Priester; 62 José Quintana; 00 Carlos Rodríguez; 35 Elvin Rodríguez; 57 Connor Thomas; 45 Abner Uribe; 53 Brandon Woodruff; 48 Craig Yoho; 58 Rob Zastryzny; 55 Bruce Zimmermann	Catchers: 24 William Contreras; 13 Eric Haase; 33 Danny Jansen; Infielders: 9 Jake Bauers; 7 Tyler Black; 18 Vinny Capra; 15 Oliver Dunn; 21 Caleb Durbin; 12 Rhys Hoskins; 14 Andruw Monasterio; 3 Joey Ortiz; 18 Anthony Seigler; 2 Brice Turang; 28 Andrew Vaughn	Outfielders: 18 Drew Avans; 35 Steward Berroa; 20 Daz Cameron; 11 Jackson Chourio; 6 Isaac Collins; 10 Sal Frelick; 20 Brandon Lockridge; 5 Garrett Mitchell; 16 Blake Perkins; 22 Christian Yelich	Manager: 49 Pat Murphy; Coaches: 41 Julio Borbón (first base); 97 Christian Correa (bullpen catcher); 99 Néstor Corredor (field coordinator); 70 Connor Dawson (hitting); 95 Daniel de Mondesert (assistant); 68 Matt Erickson (infield); 88 Charlie Greene (bullpen); 61 Jim Henderson (assistant pitching & strategy); 84 Chris Hook (pitching); 40 Jason Lane (third base); 60 Al LeBoeuf (lead hitting); 85 Eric Theisen (hitting); 23 Rickie Weeks Jr. (associate manager); 62 Adam Weisenburger (bullpen catcher)

== Player stats ==
= Indicates team leader

= Indicates league leader

=== Batting ===
Note: G = Games played; AB = At bats; R = Runs scored; H = Hits; 2B = Doubles; 3B = Triples; HR = Home runs; RBI = Runs batted in; SB = Stolen bases; BB = Walks; AVG = Batting average; SLG = Slugging average

Player	G	AB	R	H	2B	3B	HR	RBI	SB	BB	AVG	SLG
Brice Turang	156	584	97	168	28	2	18	81	24	66	.288	.435
Christian Yelich	150	573	88	151	21	0	29	103	16	64	.264	.452
William Contreras	150	566	89	147	28	0	17	76	6	84	.260	.399
Jackson Chourio	131	549	88	148	35	4	21	78	21	30	.270	.463
Sal Frelick	142	528	76	152	20	3	12	63	19	47	.288	.405
Joey Ortiz	149	470	62	108	18	1	7	45	14	27	.230	.317
Caleb Durbin	136	445	60	114	25	0	11	53	18	30	.256	.387
Isaac Collins	130	372	56	98	22	3	9	54	16	57	.263	.411
Rhys Hoskins	90	279	30	66	12	1	12	43	2	38	.237	.416
Andrew Vaughn	64	221	26	68	14	0	9	46	0	24	.308	.493
Jake Bauers	85	183	28	43	9	0	7	28	8	32	.235	.399
Blake Perkins	54	155	25	35	6	2	3	19	7	15	.226	.348
Andruw Monasterio	68	126	19	34	9	0	4	16	2	7	.270	.437
Eric Haase	30	70	11	16	3	0	2	9	0	4	.229	.357
Garrett Mitchell	25	68	9	14	4	1	0	3	3	7	.206	.294
Danny Jansen	25	67	10	17	3	0	3	7	0	9	.254	.433
Anthony Seigler	34	62	6	12	1	0	0	5	2	8	.194	.210
Vinny Capra	24	54	6	4	0	0	1	4	1	2	.074	130
Brandon Lockridge	20	46	8	12	3	1	0	6	2	4	.261	.370
Daz Cameron	21	41	7	8	1	0	1	3	1	1	.195	.293
Oliver Dunn	14	36	4	6	2	0	0	6	1	2	.167	.222
Tyler Black	5	8	1	2	1	0	0	1	0	5	.250	.375
Steward Berroa	2	5	0	0	0	0	0	0	1	1	.000	.000
Drew Avans	1	2	0	0	0	0	0	1	0	0	.000	.000
Totals	162	5510	806	1423	265	18	166	750	164	564	.258	.403

Source:Baseball Reference

=== Pitching ===
Note: W = Wins; L = Losses; ERA = Earned run average; G = Games pitched; GS = Games started; SV = Saves; IP = Innings pitched; H = Hits allowed; R = Runs allowed; ER = Earned runs allowed; BB = Walks allowed; SO = Strikeouts

Player	W	L	ERA	G	GS	SV	IP	H	R	ER	BB	SO
Freddy Peralta	17	6	2.70	33	33	0	176.2	124	54	53	66	204
Quinn Priester	13	3	3.32	29	24	0	157.1	145	62	58	50	132
Jose Quintana	11	7	3.96	24	24	0	131.2	120	65	58	50	89
Chad Patrick	3	8	3.53	27	23	0	119.2	113	49	47	40	127
Abner Uribe	3	3	1.67	75	0	7	75.1	51	18	14	27	90
Grant Anderson	2	6	3.23	66	0	0	69.2	59	35	25	29	74
Aaron Ashby	5	2	2.16	43	1	3	66.2	54	16	16	24	76
Jared Koenig	6	1	2.86	72	0	2	66.0	57	21	21	20	68
Jacob Misiorowski	5	3	4.36	15	14	0	66.0	51	34	32	31	87
Brandon Woodruff	7	2	3.20	12	12	0	64.2	45	26	23	14	83
Nick Mears	5	3	3.49	63	0	1	56.2	42	25	22	13	46
Tobias Myers	1	2	3.55	22	6	0	50.2	54	21	20	15	38
Trevor Megill	6	3	2.49	50	0	30	47.0	36	16	13	17	60
DL Hall	1	0	3.49	20	3	0	38.2	24	15	15	17	27
Tyler Alexander	3	5	6.19	21	4	1	36.1	42	31	25	12	30
Logan Anderson	3	0	1.78	5	5	0	25.1	17	5	5	8	33
Joel Payamps	0	1	7.23	28	0	1	23.2	29	19	19	9	22
Rob Zastryzny	2	1	2.45	26	1	0	22.0	16	7	6	10	20
Aaron Civale	1	2	4.91	5	5	0	22.0	23	12	12	7	19
Elvin Rodriguez	0	2	8.68	6	2	0	18.2	23	18	18	7	17
Erick Fedde	0	1	3.38	7	0	0	16.0	11	7	6	7	7
Easton McGee	0	0	5.52	9	0	0	14.2	15	9	9	5	13
Bryan Hudson	0	1	4.35	12	0	0	10.1	8	7	5	12	13
Shelby Miller	1	0	5.59	11	0	0	9.2	9	6	6	4	14
Carlos Rodríguez	1	0	6.52	4	0	0	9.2	13	7	7	9	11
Craig Yoho	0	0	7.27	8	0	0	8.2	8	7	7	9	7
Nestor Cortes	1	1	9.00	2	2	0	8.0	7	8	8	7	8
Elvis Peguero	0	0	4.91	6	0	0	7.1	8	6	4	4	5
Bruce Zimmermann	0	1	7.50	1	1	0	6.0	7	6	5	2	1
Robert Gasser	0	2	3.18	2	2	0	5.2	5	6	2	4	5
Connor Thomas	0	0	20.25	2	0	0	5.1	12	12	12	2	5
Jake Bauers	0	0	3.60	5	0	0	5.0	8	4	2	3	1
Anthony Seigler	0	0	0.00	1	0	0	1.0	1	0	0	0	0
Totals	97	65	3.59	162	162	45	1442.0	1237	634	575	534	1432

Source:Baseball Reference

== Game log ==
=== Regular season ===
Legend
	Brewers win
	Brewers loss
	Postponement
	Clinched playoff spot
	Clinched division
**Bold**	Brewers team member

2025 regular season game log: 97–65 (Home: 52–29; Away: 45–36)
March–April: 16–15 (Home: 9–4; Away: 7–11)

#	Date	Opponent	Score	Win	Loss	Save	Attendance	Record	Box/ Streak
1	March 27	@ Yankees	2–4	Rodón (1–0)	**Peralta** (0–1)	Williams (1)	46,208	0–1	L1
2	March 29	@ Yankees	9–20	Gómez (1–0)	**Cortés Jr.** (0–1)	—	46,683	0–2	L2
3	March 30	@ Yankees	3–12	Hill (1–0)	**Civale** (0–1)	—	41,803	0–3	L3
4	March 31	Royals	1–11	Bubic (1–0)	**Rodríguez** (0–1)	—	41,922	0–4	L4
5	April 1	Royals	5–0	**Uribe** (1–0)	Lorenzen (0–1)	—	18,008	1–4	W1
6	April 2	Royals	3–2 (11)	**Koenig** (1–0)	Long (0–2)	—	19,112	2–4	W2
7	April 3	Reds	1–0	**Cortés Jr.** (1–1)	Lodolo (1–1)	**Payamps** (1)	20,113	3–4	W3
8	April 4	Reds	3–2	**Alexander** (1–0)	Martinez (0–2)	**Megill** (1)	23,004	4–4	W4
9	April 5	Reds	7–11	Singer (2–0)	**Rodríguez** (0–2)	—	32,772	4–5	L1
10	April 6	Reds	8–2	**Patrick** (1–0)	Spiers (0–2)	—	25,778	5–5	W1
11	April 8	@ Rockies	7–1	**Peralta** (1–1)	Freeland (0–2)	—	18,657	6–5	W2
12	April 9	@ Rockies	17–2	**Anderson** (1–0)	Senzatela (0–2)	—	18,867	7–5	W3
13	April 10	@ Rockies	2–7	Alexander (1–1)	**Payamps** (0–1)	—	18,593	7–6	L1
14	April 11	@ Diamondbacks	7–0	**Quintana** (1–0)	Rodríguez (0–2)	—	32,026	8–6	W1
15	April 12	@ Diamondbacks	4–5	Nelson (1–0)	**Megill** (0–1)	—	34,853	8–7	L1
16	April 13	@ Diamondbacks	2–5	Beeks (1–0)	**Hudson** (0–1)	Puk (3)	30,057	8–8	L2
17	April 14	Tigers	1–9	Skubal (2–2)	**Alexander** (1–1)	—	20,892	8–9	L3
18	April 15	Tigers	5–0	**Priester** (1–0)	Flaherty (1–1)	—	18,396	9–9	W1
19	April 16	Tigers	5–1	**Quintana** (2–0)	Montero (0–1)	—	22,360	10–9	W2
20	April 18	Athletics	5–3	**Peralta** (2–1)	Ginn (1–1)	**Megill** (2)	25,008	11–9	W3
21	April 19	Athletics	1–3	Severino (1–3)	**Patrick** (1–1)	Miller (6)	30,659	11–10	L1
22	April 20	Athletics	14–1	**Henderson** (1–0)	Springs (3–2)	**Alexander** (1)	21,512	12–10	W1
23	April 21	@ Giants	2–5	Birdsong (1–0)	**Anderson** (1–1)	Doval (3)	31,758	12–11	L1
24	April 22	@ Giants	11–3	**Quintana** (3–0)	Hicks (1–3)	—	28,573	13–11	W1
25	April 23	@ Giants	2–4	Webb (3–1)	**Peralta** (2–2)	Doval (4)	29,049	13–12	L1
26	April 24	@ Giants	5–6	Rogers (2–0)	**Alexander** (1–2)	Doval (5)	28,592	13–13	L2
27	April 25	@ Cardinals	2–3	Liberatore (2–2)	**Patrick** (1–2)	Helsley (4)	24,437	13–14	L3
28	April 26	@ Cardinals	5–6	Helsley (1–0)	**Megill** (0–2)	—	35,316	13–15	L4
29	April 27	@ Cardinals	7–1	**Quintana** (4–0)	Fedde (1–3)	—	32,403	14–15	W1
30	April 29	@ White Sox	7–2	**Peralta** (3–2)	Wilson (0–1)	—	14,904	15–15	W2
31	April 30	@ White Sox	6–4	**Koenig** (2–0)	Booser (0–2)	**Megill** (3)	10,253	16–15	W3

May: 15–13 (Home: 9–6; Away: 6–7)

#	Date	Opponent	Score	Win	Loss	Save	Attendance	Record	Box / Streak
32	May 1	@ White Sox	0–8	Burke (2–4)	**Patrick** (1–3)	—	11,917	16–16	L1
33	May 2	Cubs	0–10	Brown (3–2)	**Alexander** (1–3)	Flexen (1)	34,559	16–17	L2
34	May 3	Cubs	2–6	Taillon (2–1)	**Quintana** (4–1)	—	37,335	16–18	L3
35	May 4	Cubs	4–0	**Peralta** (4–2)	Imanaga (3–2)	—	37,360	17–18	W1
36	May 5	Astros	5–1	**Myers** (1–0)	Blanco (2–3)	—	20,306	18–18	W2
37	May 6	Astros	4–3	**Patrick** (2–3)	Wesneski (1–3)	**Megill** (4)	21,075	19–18	W3
38	May 7	Astros	1–9	Valdez (2–4)	**Priester** (1–1)	—	26,922	19–19	L1
39	May 9	@ Rays	3–4	Sulser (1–1)	**Koenig** (2–1)	Orze (2)	10,046	19–20	L2
40	May 10	@ Rays	2–3	Fairbanks (3–1)	**Anderson** (1–2)	—	10,046	19–21	L3
41	May 11	@ Rays	4–2	**Alexander** (2–3)	Rasmussen (1–4)	**Megill** (5)	10,046	20–21	W1
42	May 12	@ Guardians	0–5	Junis (1–1)	**Peralta** (4–3)	—	17,359	20–22	L1
43	May 13	@ Guardians	0–2	Allen (2–2)	**Priester** (1–2)	Clase (9)	16,153	20–23	L2
44	May 14	@ Guardians	9–5	**Henderson** (2–0)	Herrin (3–1)	—	25,063	21–23	W1
45	May 16	Twins	0–3	Ryan (4–2)	**Patrick** (2–4)	Sands (2)	33,070	21–24	L1
46	May 17	Twins	0–7	López (4–2)	**Myers** (1–1)	—	40,267	21–25	L2
47	May 18	Twins	5–2	**Peralta** (5–3)	Matthews (0–1)	**Megill** (6)	30,018	22–25	W1
48	May 19	Orioles	5–4	**Uribe** (2–0)	Canó (0–4)	**Megill** (7)	22,319	23–25	W2
49	May 20	Orioles	5–2	**Henderson** (3–0)	McDermott (0–1)	**Uribe** (1)	22,778	24–25	W3
50	May 21	Orioles	4–8 (11)	Baker (3–0)	**Alexander** (2–4)	—	30,554	24–26	L1
51	May 22	@ Pirates	8–5	**Rodríguez** (1–0)	Burrows (0–1)	**Megill** (8)	10,114	25–26	W1
52	May 23	@ Pirates	5–6 (10)	Borucki (1–1)	**Uribe** (2–1)	—	24,646	25–27	L1
53	May 24	@ Pirates	1–2	Shugart (3–3)	**Alexander** (2–5)	Bednar (5)	24,651	25–28	L2
54	May 25	@ Pirates	6–5	**Koenig** (3–1)	Borucki (1–2)	**Megill** (9)	18,920	26–28	W1
55	May 26	Red Sox	3–2	**Hall** (1–0)	Crochet (4–4)	**Megill** (10)	40,181	27–28	W2
56	May 27	Red Sox	5–1 (10)	**Zastryzny** (1–0)	Hendriks (0–2)	—	26,489	28–28	W3
57	May 28	Red Sox	6–5 (10)	**Alexander** (3–5)	Slaten (1–4)	—	24,603	29–28	W4
58	May 30	@ Phillies	6–2	**Priester** (2–2)	Walker (2–4)	—	41,546	30–28	W5
59	May 31	@ Phillies	17–7	**Patrick** (3–4)	Luzardo (5–1)	—	43,773	31–28	W6

June: 16–9 (Home: 9–7; Road: 7–2)

#	Date	Opponent	Score	Win	Loss	Save	Attendance	Record	Streak/ box
60	June 1	@ Phillies	5–2	**Mears** (1–0)	Kerkering (4–2)	**Megill** (11)	44,076	32–28	W7
61	June 2	@ Reds	3–2	**Civale** (1–1)	Singer (6–4)	**Megill** (12)	18,711	33–28	W8
62	June 3	@ Reds	2–4	Ashcraft (4–4)	**Peralta** (5–4)	Pagán (15)	25,749	33–29	L1
63	June 4	@ Reds	9–1	**Priester** (3–2)	Abbott (5–1)	—	21,775	34–29	W1
64	June 6	Padres	0–2	Peralta (3–0)	**Patrick** (3–5)	Suárez (20)	32,298	34–30	L1
65	June 7	Padres	4–3	**Megill** (1–2)	Morgan (0–1)	—	37,032	35–30	W1
66	June 8	Padres	0–1	Matsui (2–1)	**Zastryzny** (1–1)	Suárez (21)	26,265	35–31	L1
67	June 9	Braves	1–7	Sale (4–4)	**Civale** (1–2)	—	25,145	35–32	L2
68	June 10	Braves	4–1	**Priester** (4–2)	Holmes (3–4)	**Megill** (13)	30,028	36–32	W1
69	June 11	Braves	2–6	Schwellenbach (5–4)	**Patrick** (3–6)	—	30,809	36–33	L1
70	June 12	Cardinals	6–0	**Misiorowski** (1–0)	Gray (7–2)	**Ashby** (1)	27,687	37–33	W1
71	June 13	Cardinals	3–2	**Peralta** (6–4)	Fedde (3–6)	**Megill** (14)	30,026	38–33	W2
72	June 14	Cardinals	5–8	Leahy (2–1)	**Quintana** (4–2)	—	39,017	38–34	L1
73	June 15	Cardinals	3–2	**Priester** (5–2)	Mikolas (4–4)	**Megill** (15)	40,629	39–34	W1
74	June 17	@ Cubs	3–5	Brown (4–5)	**Patrick** (3–7)	Palencia (7)	38,687	39–35	L1
―	June 18	@ Cubs	Postponed (rain); Makeup: August 18						
75	June 19	@ Cubs	8–7	**Peralta** (7–4)	Taillon (7–4)	**Megill** (16)	41,078	40–35	W1
76	June 20	@ Twins	17–6	**Misiorowski** (2–0)	Ryan (7–3)	—	28,011	41–35	W2
77	June 21	@ Twins	9–0	**Quintana** (5–2)	Woods Richardson (2–4)	—	28,321	42–35	W3
78	June 22	@ Twins	9–8	**Zastryzny** (2–1)	Festa (1–2)	**Megill** (17)	21,143	43–35	W4
79	June 23	Pirates	4–5	Shugart (4–3)	**Mears** (1–1)	Bednar (11)	26,791	43–36	L1
80	June 24	Pirates	9–3	**Peralta** (8–4)	Heaney (3–7)	—	31,772	44–36	W1
81	June 25	Pirates	4–2	**Misiorowski** (3–0)	Skenes (4–7)	**Megill** (18)	42,774	45–36	W2
82	June 27	Rockies	10–6	**Quintana** (6–2)	Freeland (1–9)	—	35,008	46–36	W3
83	June 28	Rockies	5–0	**Priester** (6–2)	Senzatela (3–11)	—	32,057	47–36	W4
84	June 29	Rockies	3–4 (11)	Vodnik (3–2)	**Anderson** (1–3)	Kinley (3)	30,037	47–37	L1

July: 17–7 (Home: 9–3; Road: 8–4)

#	Date	Opponent	Score	Win	Loss	Save	Attendance	Record	Streak/ box
―	July 1	@ Mets	Postponed (rain); Makeup: July 2						
85	July 2 (1)	@ Mets	7–2	**Peralta** (9–4)	Garrett (2–4)	—	36,335	48–37	W1
86	July 2 (2)	@ Mets	3–7	Tidwell (1–1)	**Misiorowski** (3–1)	Díaz (17)	41,123	48–38	L1
87	July 3	@ Mets	2–3	Peterson (6–4)	**Quintana** (6–3)	Díaz (18)	42,241	48–39	L2
88	July 4	@ Marlins	6–5	**Ashby** (1–0)	Gibson (2–4)	**Megill** (19)	16,716	49–39	W1
89	July 5	@ Marlins	2–4	Henríquez (5–1)	**Mears** (1–2)	Bachar (1)	11,378	49–40	L1
90	July 6	@ Marlins	3–1	**Woodruff** (1–0)	Cabrera (3–3)	**Megill** (20)	12,513	50–40	W1
91	July 7	Dodgers	9–1	**Peralta** (10–4)	Yamamoto (8–7)	—	35,365	51–40	W2
92	July 8	Dodgers	3–1	**Misiorowski** (4–1)	Kershaw (4–1)	**Megill** (21)	38,175	52–40	W3
93	July 9	Dodgers	3–2 (10)	**Megill** (2–2)	Yates (4–3)	—	33,607	53–40	W4
94	July 11	Nationals	8–3	**Priester** (7–2)	Parker (5–10)	—	35,057	54–40	W5
95	July 12	Nationals	6–5	**Anderson** (2–3)	Finnegan (1–3)	—	35,015	55–40	W6
96	July 13	Nationals	8–1	**Peralta** (11–4)	Irvin (7–5)	—	32,135	56–40	W7
ASG	July 15	AL @ NL	–					—	
97	July 18	@ Dodgers	2–0	**Priester** (8–2)	Glasnow (1–1)	**Megill** (22)	49,281	57–40	W8
98	July 19	@ Dodgers	8–7	**Peralta** (12–4)	Sheehan (0–2)	**Megill** (23)	53,540	58–40	W9
99	July 20	@ Dodgers	6–5	**Quintana** (7–3)	Trivino (3–1)	**Uribe** (2)	40,376	59–40	W10
100	July 21	@ Mariners	6–0	**Woodruff** (2–0)	Kirby (4–5)	—	30,085	60–40	W11
101	July 22	@ Mariners	0–1	Gilbert (3–3)	**Mears** (1–3)	Muñoz (22)	32,189	60–41	L1
102	July 23	@ Mariners	10–2	**Priester** (9–2)	Castillo (7–6)	—	41,449	61–41	W1
103	July 25	Marlins	1–5	Simpson (2–0)	**Ashby** (1–1)	—	41,944	61–42	L1
104	July 26	Marlins	4–7	Junk (5–2)	**Quintana** (7–4)	Phillips (1)	38,055	61–43	L2
105	July 27	Marlins	3–2	**Megill** (3–2)	Gibson (2–5)	—	40,158	62–43	W1
106	July 28	Cubs	8–4	**Mears** (2–3)	Boyd (11–4)	**Megill** (24)	41,076	63–43	W2
107	July 29	Cubs	9–3	**Priester** (10–2)	Rea (8–5)	**Ashby** (2)	40,136	64–43	W3
108	July 30	Cubs	3–10	Imanaga (8–4)	**Peralta** (12–5)	—	42,807	64–44	L1

August: 21–9 (Home: 9–4; Road: 12–5)

#	Date	Opponent	Score	Win	Loss	Save	Attendance	Record	Streak/ box
109	August 1	@ Nationals	16–9	**Quintana** (8–4)	Parker (7–11)	—	25,194	65–44	W1
110	August 2	@ Nationals	8–2	**Woodruff** (3–0)	Irvin (8–6)	—	28,869	66–44	W2
111	August 3	@ Nationals	14–3	**Ashby** (2–1)	Lord (2–6)	—	20,066	67–44	W3
112	August 4	@ Braves	3–1	**Priester** (11–2)	Fedde (3–12)	**Megill** (25)	30,790	68–44	W4
113	August 5	@ Braves	7–2	**Peralta** (13–5)	Wentz (2–3)	—	30,642	69–44	W5
114	August 6	@ Braves	5–4	**Quintana** (9–4)	Strider (5–9)	**Megill** (26)	30,964	70–44	W6
115	August 8	Mets	3–2	**Woodruff** (4–0)	Senga (7–4)	**Megill** (27)	43,469	71–44	W7
116	August 9	Mets	7–4	**Koenig** (4–1)	Stanek (2–6)	**Megill** (28)	40,156	72–44	W8
117	August 10	Mets	7–6	**Mears** (3–3)	Díaz (5–2)	—	42,461	73–44	W9
118	August 11	Pirates	7–1	**Quintana** (10–4)	Heaney (5–10)	—	30,045	74–44	W10
119	August 12	Pirates	14–0	**Peralta** (14–5)	Skenes (7–9)	—	32,064	75–44	W11
120	August 13	Pirates	12–5	**Koenig** (5–1)	Keller (5–11)	—	40,123	76–44	W12
121	August 15	@ Reds	10–8	**Mears** (4–3)	Barlow (6–1)	**Megill** (29)	25,470	77–44	W13
122	August 16	@ Reds	6–5 (11)	**Megill** (4–2)	La Sorsa (0–1)	**Mears** (1)	39,022	78–44	W14
123	August 17	@ Reds	2–3 (10)	Ashcraft (7–4)	**Anderson** (2–4)	—	26,426	78–45	L1
124	August 18 (1)	@ Cubs	7–0	**Peralta** (15–5)	Horton (7–4)	—	38,971	79–45	W1
―	August 18 (2)	@ Cubs	Postponed (rain); Makeup: August 19						
125	August 19 (1)	@ Cubs	4–6	Boyd (12–6)	**Patrick** (3–8)	Palencia (17)	33,103	79–46	L1
126	August 19 (2)	@ Cubs	1–4	Taillon (8–6)	**Woodruff** (4–1)	Kittredge (2)	34,540	79–47	L2
127	August 20	@ Cubs	3–4	Rea (10–5)	**Misiorowski** (4–2)	Palencia (18)	36,327	79–48	L3
128	August 21	@ Cubs	4–1	**Mears** (5–3)	Imanaga (8–6)	**Megill** (30)	37,850	80–48	W1
129	August 22	Giants	5–4	**Megill** (5–2)	Rodríguez (3–5)	—	41,176	81–48	W2
130	August 23	Giants	1–7	Webb (12–9)	**Anderson** (2–5)	—	41,034	81–49	L1
131	August 24	Giants	3–4	Buttó (4–3)	**Megill** (5–3)	Walker (11)	42,053	81–50	L2
132	August 25	Diamondbacks	7–5	**Woodruff** (5–1)	Rodríguez (5–8)	**Uribe** (3)	28,486	82–50	W1
133	August 26	Diamondbacks	9–8	**Miller** (4–3)	Morillo (0–3)	—	32,850	83–50	W2
134	August 27	Diamondbacks	2–3	Nelson (7–3)	**Fedde** (4–13)	Saalfrank (3)	26,176	83–51	L1
135	August 28	Diamondbacks	4–6	Crismatt (2–0)	**Quintana** (10–5)	Rashi (1)	35,822	83–52	L2
136	August 29	@ Blue Jays	7–2	**Peralta** (16–5)	Bieber (1–1)	—	41,390	84–52	W1
137	August 30	@ Blue Jays	4–1	**Ashby** (3–1)	Hoffman (8–6)	**Uribe** (4)	41,424	85–52	W2
138	August 31	@ Blue Jays	4–8	Nance (2–0)	**Woodruff** (5–2)	—	41,488	85–53	L1

September: 12–12 (Home: 7–5; Road: 5–7)

#	Date	Opponent	Score	Win	Loss	Save	Attendance	Record	Streak/ box
139	September 1	Phillies	8–10	Robertson (2–0)	**Uribe** (2–2)	Durán (25)	42,153	85–54	L2
140	September 3	Phillies	6–3	**Quintana** (11–5)	Nola (3–8)	**Koenig** (1)	28,528	86–54	W1
141	September 4	Phillies	0–2	Suárez (11–6)	**Myers** (1–2)	Durán (26)	26,583	86–55	L1
142	September 5	@ Pirates	5–2	**Priester** (12–2)	Mlodzinski (3–8)	**Uribe** (5)	14,122	87–55	W1
143	September 6	@ Pirates	4–1	**Woodruff** (6–2)	Keller (6–14)	**Ashby** (3)	17,975	88–55	W2
144	September 7	@ Pirates	10–2	**Misiorowski** (5–2)	Chandler (2–1)	—	12,443	89–55	W3
145	September 8	@ Rangers	0–5	Latz (2–0)	**Quintana** (11–6)	—	20,791	89–56	L1
146	September 9	@ Rangers	4–5	Milner (3–4)	**Ashby** (3–2)	Armstrong (8)	24,581	89–57	L2
147	September 10	@ Rangers	3–6	Kelly (12–7)	**Peralta** (16–6)	Maton (4)	24,682	89–58	L3
148	September 12	Cardinals	8–2	**Priester** (13–2)	Pallante (6–14)	—	40,525	90–58	W1
149	September 13	Cardinals	9–8 (10)	**Uribe** (3–2)	Leahy (4–2)	—	41,807	91–58	W2
150	September 14	Cardinals	2–3	Mikolas (8–10)	**Quintana** (11–7)	O'Brien (4)	42,269	91–59	L1
151	September 16	Angels	9–2	**Peralta** (17–6)	Dana (0–2)	—	28,566	92–59	W1
152	September 17	Angels	9–2	**Woodruff** (7–2)	Soriano (10–11)	—	28,493	93–59	W2
153	September 18	Angels	5–2	**Ashby** (4–2)	García (2–2)	**Koenig** (2)	34,261	94–59	W3
154	September 19	@ Cardinals	1–7	Gray (14–8)	**Misiorowski** (5–3)	—	29,752	94–60	L1
155	September 20	@ Cardinals	3–2 (10)	**Koenig** (6–1)	Romero (4–6)	—	36,212	95–60	W1
156	September 21	@ Cardinals	1–5	Liberatore (8–12)	**Gasser** (0–1)	—	32,723	95–61	L1
157	September 22	@ Padres	4–5 (11)	Rodríguez (1–0)	**Anderson** (2–6)	—	42,371	95–62	L2
158	September 23	@ Padres	0–7	Vásquez (6–7)	**Zimmermann** (0–1)	—	44,089	95–63	L3
159	September 24	@ Padres	3–1	**Ashby** (5–2)	Morejón (13–6)	**Uribe** (6)	41,462	96–63	W1
160	September 26	Reds	1–3	Phillips (5–0)	**Priester** (13–3)	Pagán (31)	40,316	96–64	L1
161	September 27	Reds	4–7	Abbott (10–7)	**Gasser** (0–2)	Pagán (32)	40,801	96–65	L2
162	September 28	Reds	4–2	**Megill** (6–3)	Singer (14–12)	**Uribe** (7)	41,055	97–65	W1

== Postseason ==
=== Game log ===
2025 Postseason game log: 3–6 (Home: 3–2; Away: 0–4)
NL Division Series: 3–2 (Home: 3–0; Away: 0–2)

#	Date	Opponent	Score	Win	Loss	Save	Attendance	Record	Box/ Streak
1	October 4	Cubs	9–3	Peralta (1–0)	Boyd (0–1)	—	42,678	1–0	W1
2	October 6	Cubs	7–3	Misiorowski (1–0)	Imanaga (0–1)	—	42,787	2–0	W2
3	October 8	@ Cubs	3–4	Pomeranz (1–0)	Priester (0–1)	Keller (2)	40,737	2–1	L1
4	October 9	@ Cubs	0–6	Palencia (3–0)	Peralta (1–1)	—	41,770	2–2	L2
5	October 11	Cubs	3–1	Misiorowski (2–0)	Rea (0–1)	Uribe (1)	42,743	3–2	W1

NL Championship Series: 0–4 (Home: 0–2; Away: 0–2)

#	Date	Opponent	Score	Win	Loss	Save	Attendance	Record	Box/ Streak
1	October 13	Dodgers	1–2	Snell (3–0)	Patrick (0–1)	Treinen (1)	41,737	0–1	L1
2	October 14	Dodgers	1–5	Yamamoto (2–1)	Peralta (1–2)	—	41,427	0–2	L2
3	October 16	@ Dodgers	1–3	Vesia (2–0)	Misiorowski (2–1)	Sasaki (3)	51,251	0–3	L3
4	October 17	@ Dodgers	1–5	Ohtani (2–0)	Quintana (0–1)	—	52,883	0–4	L4

=== Postseason rosters ===
Playoff rosters
National League Division Series

- Pitchers: 25 Nick Mears 26 Aaron Ashby 29 Trevor Megill 32 Jacob Misiorowski 39 Chad Patrick 45 Abner Uribe 46 Quinn Priester 47 Jared Koenig 51 Freddy Peralta 54 Robert Gasser 56 Grant Anderson 62 José Quintana
- Catchers: 24 William Contreras 33 Danny Jansen
- Infielders: 2 Brice Turang 3 Joey Ortiz 9 Jake Bauers 14 Andruw Monasterio 21 Caleb Durbin 28 Andrew Vaughn
- Outfielders: 6 Isaac Collins 10 Sal Frelick 11 Jackson Chourio 16 Blake Perkins 20 Brandon Lockridge 22 Christian Yelich

National League Championship Series

- Pitchers: 26 Aaron Ashby 29 Trevor Megill 32 Jacob Misiorowski 36 Tobias Myers 39 Chad Patrick 45 Abner Uribe 46 Quinn Priester 47 Jared Koenig 51 Freddy Peralta 54 Robert Gasser 56 Grant Anderson 62 José Quintana
- Catchers: 24 William Contreras 33 Danny Jansen
- Infielders: 2 Brice Turang 3 Joey Ortiz 9 Jake Bauers 14 Andruw Monasterio 21 Caleb Durbin 28 Andrew Vaughn
- Outfielders: 6 Isaac Collins 10 Sal Frelick 11 Jackson Chourio 16 Blake Perkins 20 Brandon Lockridge 22 Christian Yelich

== Farm system ==
The Brewers' farm system consisted of seven minor league affiliates in 2025.

Level	Team	League	Manager
Triple-A	Nashville Sounds	International League	Rick Sweet
Double-A	Biloxi Shuckers	Southern League	Joe Ayrault
High-A	Wisconsin Timber Rattlers	Midwest League	Victor Estevez
Single-A	Carolina Mudcats	Carolina League	Nick Stanley
Rookie	ACL Brewers	Arizona Complex League	Rafael Neda
Rookie	DSL Brewers Blue	Dominican Summer League	Victor Rey
Rookie	DSL Brewers Gold	Dominican Summer League	Natanael Mejia
