= Zerpa =

Zerpa is a surname. Notable people with the surname include:

- Ángel Zerpa (born 1999), Venezuelan baseball player
- Carlos Zerpa (born 1950), Venezuelan painter
- Fabio Zerpa (1928–2019), Uruguayan actor, parapsychologist, and UFO researcher
