= Quinn Priester =

American baseball player (born 2000)

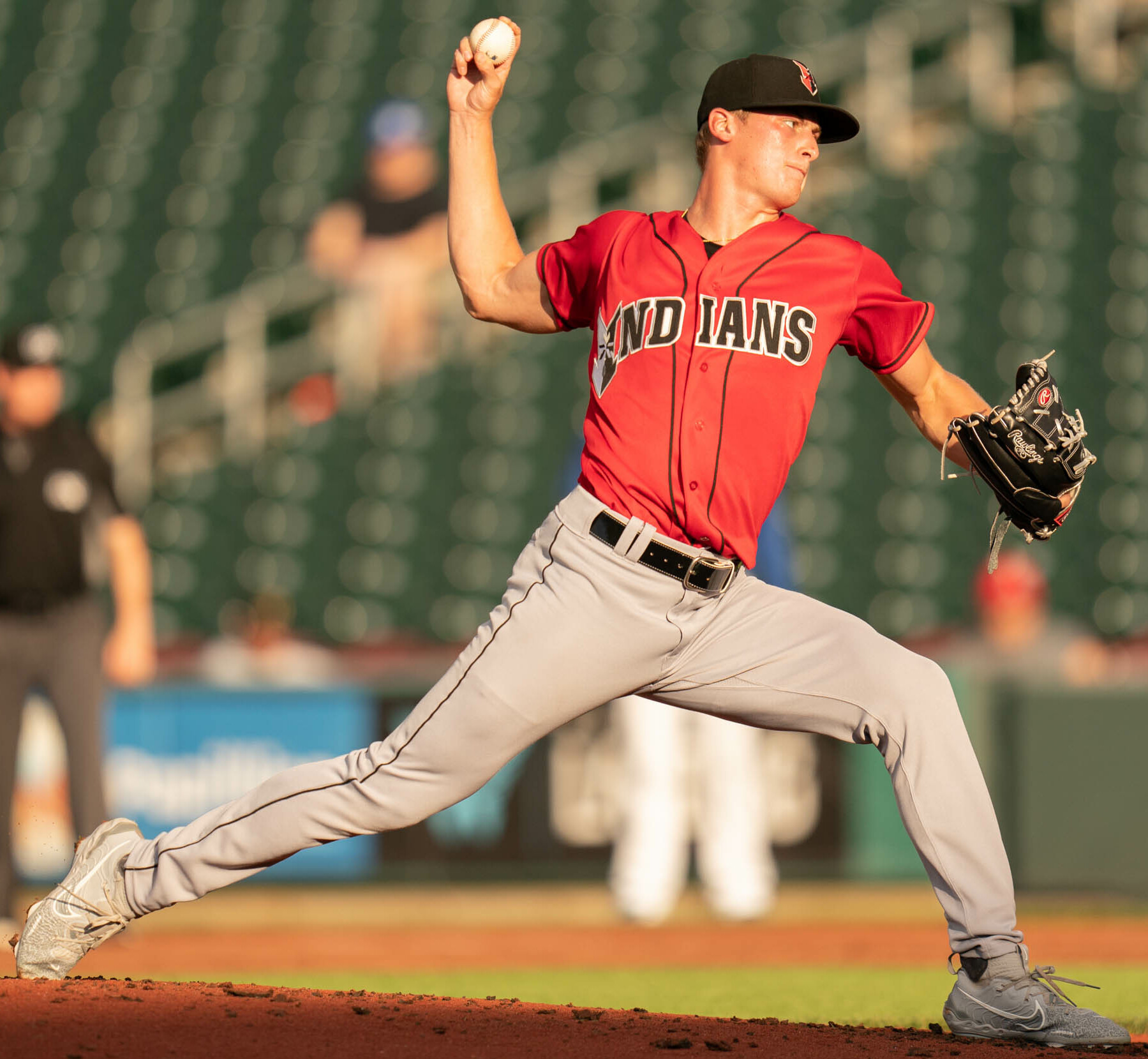
- Priester with the Indianapolis Indians in 2023

Milwaukee Brewers – No. 46
- Pitcher
- Born: September 15, 2000 (age 26); Glendale Heights, Illinois, U.S.
- Bats: Right Throws: Right

MLB debut
- July 17, 2023, for the Pittsburgh Pirates

MLB statistics (through 2025 season)
- Win–loss record: 19–12
- Earned run average: 4.45
- Strikeouts: 201
- Stats at Baseball Reference

Teams
- Pittsburgh Pirates (2023–2024); Boston Red Sox (2024); Milwaukee Brewers (2025)

Charles Quinn Priester (born September 15, 2000) is an American professional baseball pitcher for the Milwaukee Brewers of Major League Baseball (MLB). He has previously played in MLB for the Pittsburgh Pirates and Boston Red Sox. He was selected by the Pirates in the first round of the 2019 MLB draft, and made his MLB debut with them in 2023.

== Amateur career ==
Priester attended Cary-Grove High School in Cary, Illinois. He played baseball and football, and was a member of the 2018 Cary-Grove football team that won the 6A state championship. He also caught a touchdown pass in the championship game. In 2019, as a senior, he had a 8–2 win–loss record with a 1.00 earned run average (ERA), striking out 91 batters in 60 1/3 innings pitched. He was named the Illinois Gatorade Baseball Player of the Year. He committed to play college baseball at Texas Christian University.

== Professional career ==
=== Pittsburgh Pirates ===
The Pittsburgh Pirates selected Priester in the first round, with the 18th overall selection, in the 2019 Major League Baseball draft. He signed with the Pirates on June 10 for $3.4 million. After signing, he was assigned to the rookie–level Gulf Coast League Pirates. Over nine games (eight starts) in the GCL, he went 1–1 with a 3.19 ERA, striking out 41 over 36 1/3 innings. He did not play in a game in 2020 due to the cancellation of the minor league season because of the COVID-19 pandemic.

Priester spent the 2021 season with the High-A Greensboro Grasshoppers with whom he went 7–4 with a 3.04 ERA and 98 strikeouts over 97 2/3 innings. In June, he was selected to play in the All-Star Futures Game.

Priester split the 2022 season between the Single-A Bradenton Marauders, Greensboro, Double-A Altoona Curve, and Triple-A Indianapolis Indians. In 19 starts between the four affiliates, he accumulated a 5–5 record and 3.29 ERA with 89 strikeouts across 90 1/3 innings pitched.

In 2023, Priester began the season with Indianapolis. In 18 starts, he registered a 7–3 record and 4.31 ERA with 84 strikeouts in 87 2/3 innings pitched. On July 17, 2023, Priester was selected to the 40-man roster and promoted to the major leagues for the first time. He made his MLB debut that day as the starting pitcher against the Cleveland Guardians; in 5 1/3 innings, he allowed 7 runs on 7 hits and 2 walks with 2 strikeouts, earning the loss. In 10 games (8 starts) during his rookie campaign, Priester struggled to a 7.74 ERA with 36 strikeouts across 50 innings pitched.

Priester was optioned to Triple-A Indianapolis to begin the 2024 season after he was beat out by Jared Jones for the final rotation spot. He was called up to the major leagues in April and pitched to a 2–6 record and 5.04 ERA across 44 2/3 innings. In 10 appearances (6 starts), he allowing 52 hits, 25 earned runs, seven home runs, and 13 walks, while recording 31 strikeouts.

=== Boston Red Sox ===
On July 29, 2024, the Pirates traded Priester to the Boston Red Sox in exchange for Nick Yorke. He was subsequently assigned to Boston’s Triple-A affiliate, the Worcester Red Sox. The Red Sox instructed Priester to focus on his velocity, as the team believed that his sinker needed to average 96 miles per hour (154 km/h). Priester started Boston's season finale against the Tampa Bay Rays, allowing one run on four hits with two strikeouts across five innings pitched.

Priester was optioned to Triple-A Worcester to begin the 2025 season.

=== Milwaukee Brewers ===
On April 7, 2025, Priester was traded by the Red Sox to the Milwaukee Brewers in exchange for minor league outfielder Yophery Rodriguez, a Competitive Balance Round selection in the 2025 MLB draft, where the Red Sox selected Marcus Phillips with the 33rd pick and a player to be named later (or cash considerations). On May 5, John Holobetz was sent to Boston as the PTBNL.

Beginning in mid-May, Priester strung together an eight-game stretch where he had an ERA of 2.23, a walk rate of 5.6%, and a groundball rate of 60%. This success was enough that when the Brewers promoted the high-end starting pitcher prospect Jacob Misiorowski on June 12, they traded the veteran Aaron Civale instead of using Priester's minor league option. By the end of July, Priester showed continued success with a 10-2 record and a 3.27 ERA.

On Sept. 18, 2025, with an 8-2 win over the St. Louis Cardinals, Priester recorded his 12th consecutive winning decision, further surpassing a Brewers franchise record that had previously been held by two separate pitchers, Chris Bosio and Cal Eldred, who each had 10-game winning streaks in 1992. On Sept. 18, Priester left a start against the Los Angeles Angels in the sixth inning with the score tied 2-2, a game the Brewers would go on to win 5-2; that marked the 19th consecutive win for the Brewers in games which Priester appeared, another franchise record.

Priester was placed on the injured list to start the 2026 season due to thoracic outlet syndrome-adjacent issues. He had been dealing with wrist soreness since the 2025 season, and the issue was diagnosed by a specialist after the soreness worsened during 2026 spring training. Priester was transferred to the 60-day injured list on June 6. On June 18, it was announced that Priester would undergo thoracic outlet surgery, ending his season.

== Personal life ==
Priester and his wife, Regan, married in November 2025 in Jupiter, Florida.
