= Carlos Zerpa =

Carlos Zerpa (born 1950 in Valencia, Venezuela), was a 20th-century Latin American painter. He moved to live in Milan in 1973 to study printmaking and photography at the Scuola Cova, and design with Bruno Munari at the Instituto Politécnico. Zerpa was a self-taught painter, by 1974 he was creating installations and performance pieces. He returned to Venezuela in 1980, but spent two years in New York: (1982 to 1984). By 1984 he ceased performing and concentrated on making objects. His work is in many ways autobiographical. It recalls department store displays cases which serve as stages for his homages to the past. Zerpa also trained in design, photography and printmaking, paintings, drawings, sculptures, performances and installations, He exhibited internationally and won many awards. Carlos Zerpa trained in Italy, Germany, and United States; he blended kitsch with references to Giotto, van Gogh, Picasso, and Duchamp. His focus was towards historical themes in terms of spatial and temporal shifts was addressed to several Venezuelan artist one of them being Carlos Zerpa. The preoccupation with time seems especially relevant in a country whose historical development does not go back much before the eighteenth century. Carlos Zerpa and Miguel von Dangel chose as their referent the period of the discovery of the new world and just prior, through a mythology of its human and animal inhabitants primarily located in the Caribbean and the area now occupied by Venezuela. Zerpa after Christopher Columbus encountering "new tribes, strange animals and lush forests" Carlos capitalized these myths as well as on his grasp of Western art history, from which he appropriated liberally.

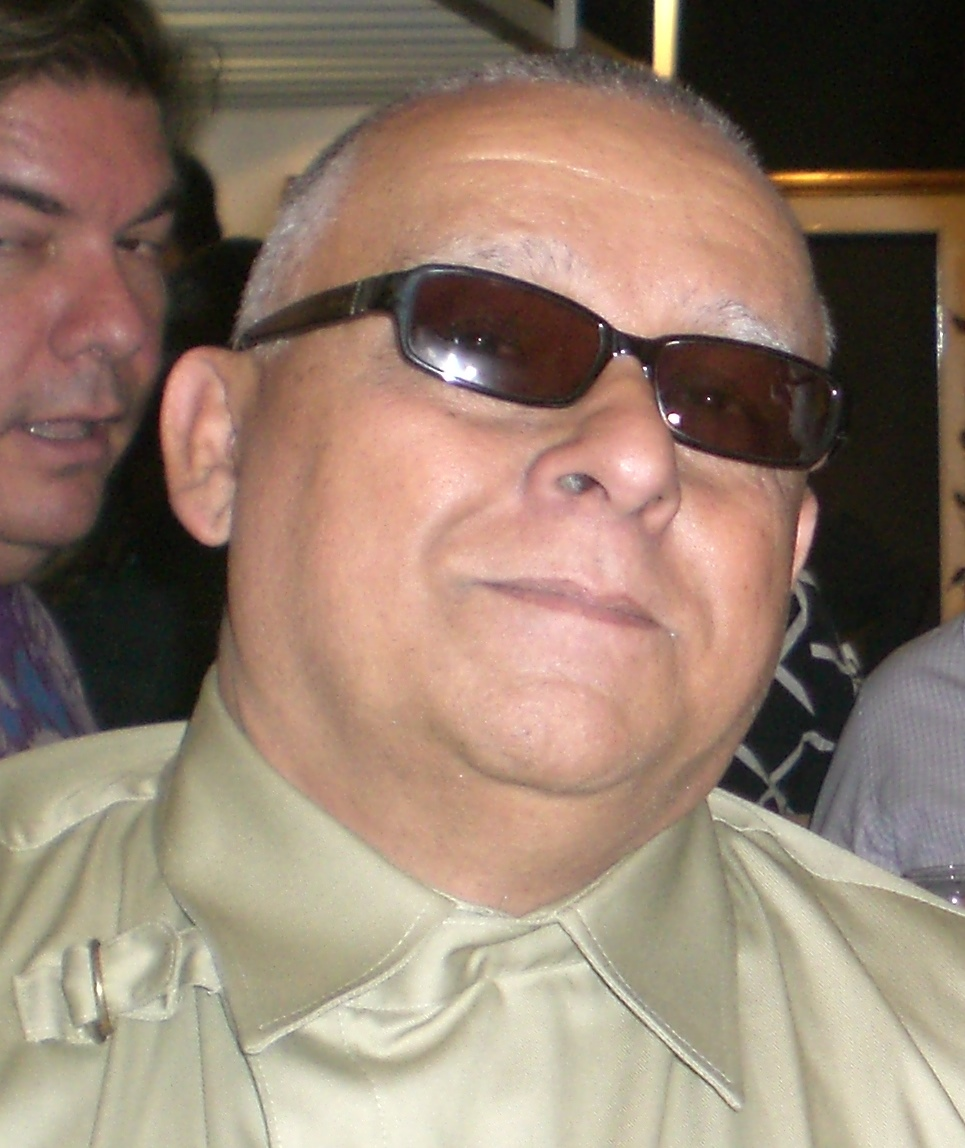
Carlos Zerpa, April 22, 2012, in Caracas

Influence: Carlos Zerpa series the" India Nova's" El Dorado was greatly influenced by Theodor de Bry, a Flemish designer, engraver, and printmaker. Zerpa valued de Bry's work that his most recognized series was his interpretation on acrylic painting series called "El Dorado" which was based on the fanciful chronicles and records of European explorers and visually on prints by the Belgium artist. Zerpa deliberately created a secondhand visual account of an already distorted Eurocentric one by borrowing from de Bry; he perpetuated the farce by enhancing/ modifying a modern-day mythology for the new world. Zerpa did his own version of "El Dorado" the de Bry's 1594 print of an Indian ruler being dusted with gold before a ritual ceremony. In Zerpa's garishly colored painting, the Indian ruler stands in a classical contrapposto while the attendants sponge him with paint and blow the gold powder onto his naked body. A dark eagle hovers menacingly above. Zerpa reversed the figures to account for the fact that the source was a printed image. The eagle in his painting substitutes for a mountain in de Bry's print. Zerpa managed to incorporate personal genuine totaling, for example by reversing the figures seeing as it was a printed image it was easily manipulated, he also replaced the mountain on de Bry's print with an eagle. There is major diversity on both de Bry's piece with Zerpa depiction of "El Dorado", but both equally respond individual. Zerpa's transformation of "El Dorado"(1987;PL. 12.8), "The Golden One" was a very stylistic approach with vibrant neon colors lavishing from the ground up. The totality of the golden one deems modern, pop art capturing historical events from time in an original method. Another work by Zerpa "Acefalo A cephalous, or (The Headless one 1987), he parodies accounts of a headless tribe with an arrow-bearing figure whose face is on his chest. In one of his typical anachronisms, Zerpa includes a barely detectable chair in the sky above the figure, appropriated from van Gogh's painting of his bedroom in Arles.

Other works by the Carlos Zerpa series are, [El Dorado], [The Golden One] in the Nova series of 1987, acrylic on canvas 192x132 cm which exhibited at Caracas, Mercantil Collection. Other paintings Zerpa interprets [Acephalous, or The Headless One](1987), [This Golden Whale] (1987), [Trito, an Adam in the Tropics] (1986). Zerpa had solo exhibitions at the Museo de Arte Carillo Gil in Mexico City in 1993 and at the Museo de Bellas Artes in Caracas in 1994.
