= Ángel Zerpa =

Venezuelan baseball player (born 1999)

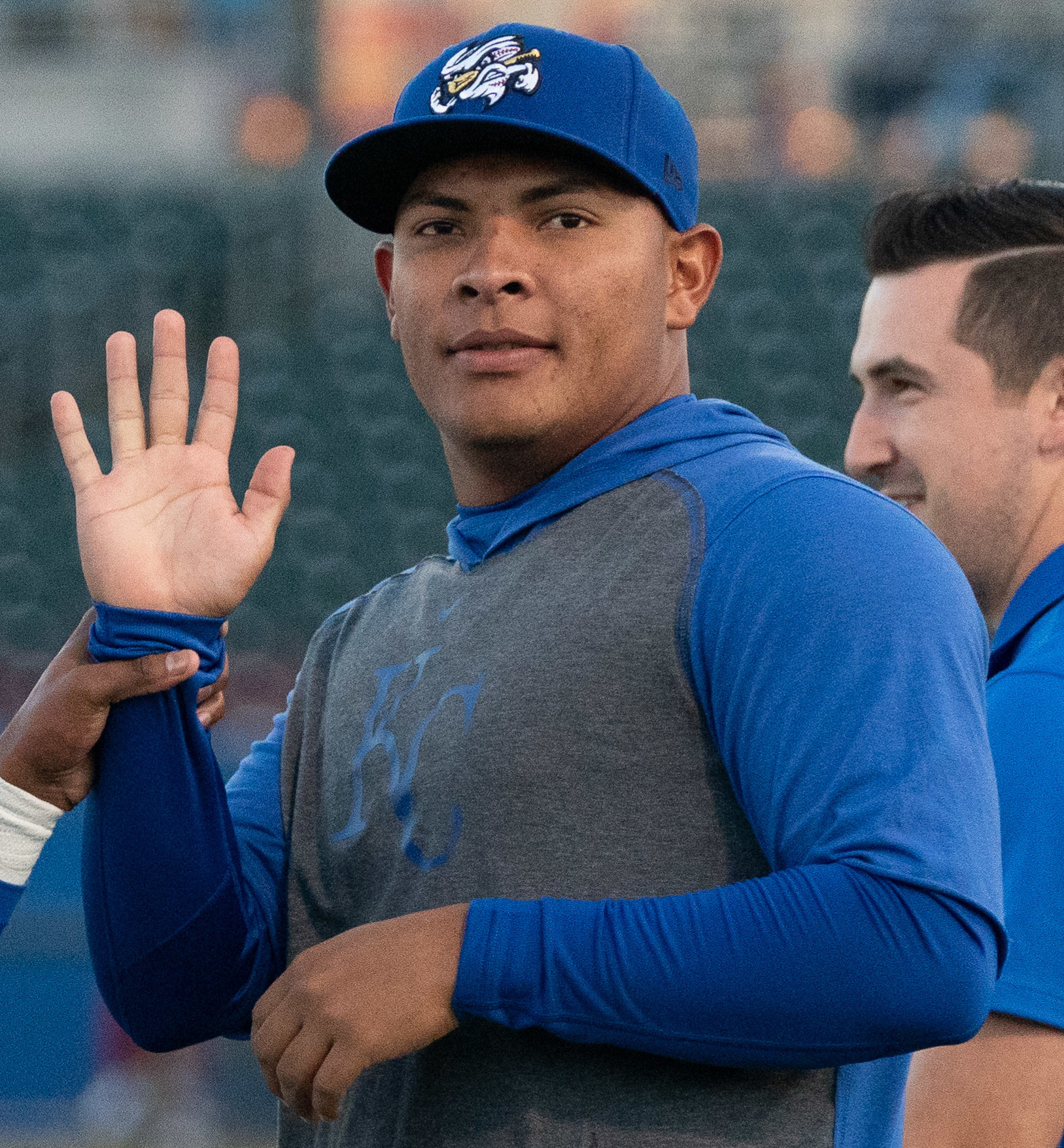
- Zerpa with the Omaha Storm Chasers in 2021

Milwaukee Brewers – No. 61
- Pitcher
- Born: September 27, 1999 (age 27); Valle de la Pascua, Venezuela
- Bats: Left Throws: Left

MLB debut
- September 30, 2021, for the Kansas City Royals

MLB statistics (through 2026 season)
- Win–loss record: 12–9
- Earned run average: 4.13
- Strikeouts: 158
- Stats at Baseball Reference

Teams
- Kansas City Royals (2021–2025); Milwaukee Brewers (2026–present)
Medals
Men's baseball
Representing Venezuela
World Baseball Classic
Gold medal – first place	2026 Miami	Team

Ángel David Zerpa (born September 27, 1999) is a Venezuelan professional baseball pitcher for the Milwaukee Brewers of Major League Baseball (MLB). He has previously played in MLB for the Kansas City Royals. He made his MLB debut in 2021.

== Career ==
=== Kansas City Royals ===
Zerpa signed with the Kansas City Royals as an international free agent on July 26, 2016 for a $100,000 signing bonus. Zerpa made his professional debut in 2017 with the Dominican Summer League Royals, going 3–4 with a 1.84 ERA and 39 strikeouts over 63 2/3 innings. He spent the 2018 season with the Arizona League Royals, going 3–6 with a 3.88 ERA and 34 strikeouts over 48 2/3 innings. Zerpa split the 2019 season between the Burlington Royals and the Idaho Falls Chukars, going a combined 6–3 with a 3.40 ERA and 55 strikeouts over 55 1/3 innings. He did not play in a game in 2020 due to the cancellation of the minor league season because of the COVID-19 pandemic.

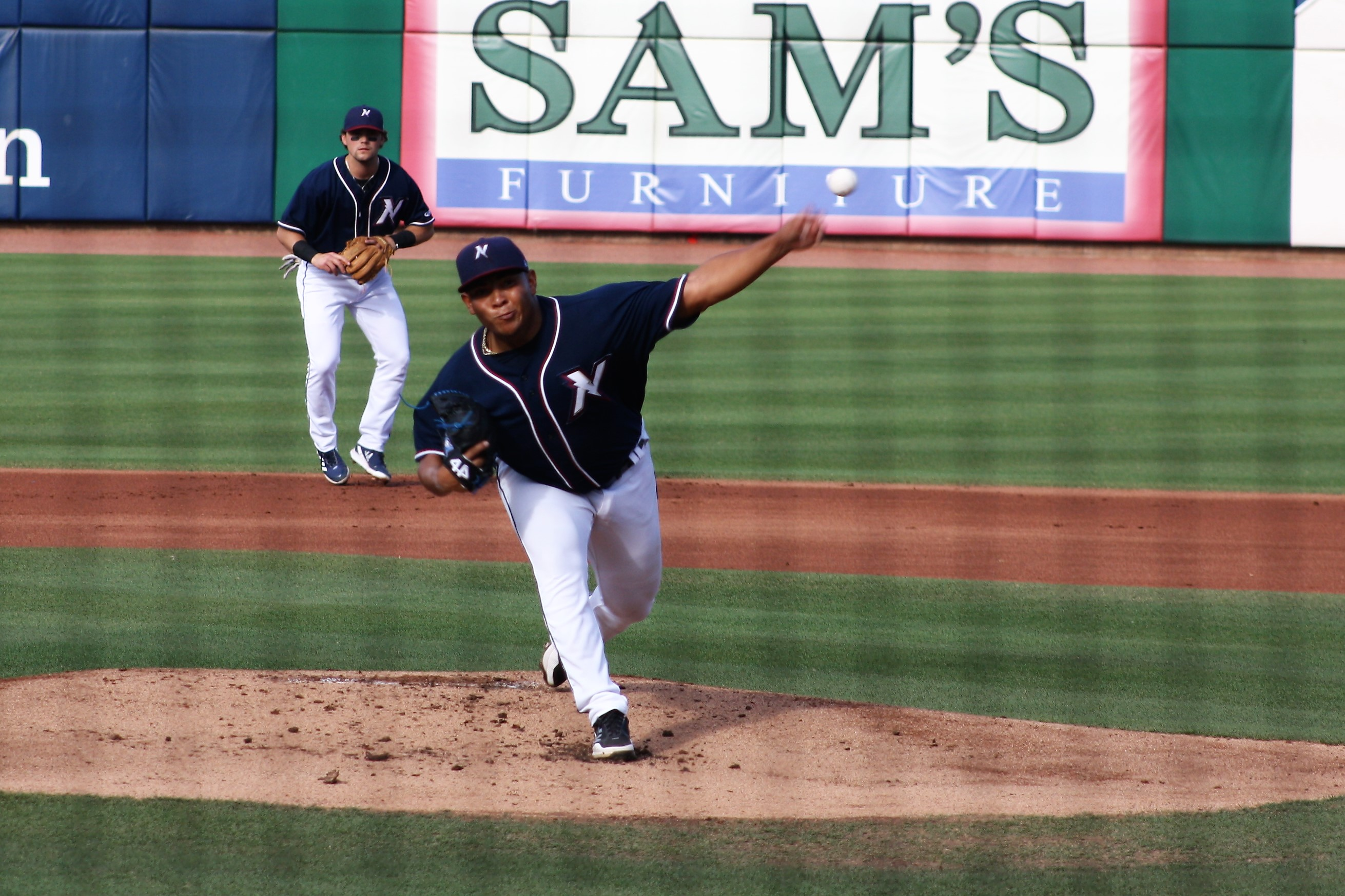
Zerpa pitches for the Northwest Arkansas Naturals

On November 20, 2020, the Royals added Zerpa to their 40-man roster to protect him from the Rule 5 draft. Zerpa split the 2021 minor league season between the High-A Quad Cities River Bandits, Double-A Northwest Arkansas Naturals, and Triple-A Omaha Storm Chasers, going a combined 4–4 with a 4.58 ERA and 108 strikeouts over 88 1/3 innings.

On September 30, 2021, Zerpa was recalled to the active roster to make his MLB debut as the starting pitcher against the Cleveland Indians.

In 2022, Zerpa made three appearances (two starts) for the Royals, logging a 2–1 record and 1.64 ERA with three strikeouts in 11 innings pitched. In 19 starts split between Northwest Arkansas and Omaha, Zerpa posted a 2–5 record and 4.02 ERA with 69 strikeouts in 71 2/3 innings of work. He was placed on the 60-day injured list on August 2, 2021 with a small tear in his patellar tendon, and missed the remainder of the year.

On March 15, 2023, Zerpa was placed on the 60-day injured list with left shoulder tendinopathy. He was activated on July 14, and subsequently optioned to Triple–A Omaha. Zerpa made 15 appearances (three starts) for Kansas City during the year, recording a 3-3 record and 4.85 ERA with 36 strikeouts across 42 2/3 innings pitched.

Zerpa made 60 appearances out of the bullpen for Kansas City during the 2024 campaign, registering a 2-0 record and 3.86 ERA with 49 strikeouts across 53 2/3 innings pitched. He pitched in 69 games (including two starts) for the Royals in 2025, posting a 5-2 record and 4.18 ERA with 58 strikeouts over 64 2/3 innings.

=== Milwaukee Brewers ===
On December 14, 2025, Zerpa was traded to the Milwaukee Brewers in exchange for Isaac Collins and Nick Mears. He made 12 appearances for the Brewers, compiling an 0-2 record and 6.39 ERA with eight strikeouts and two saves across 12 2/3 innings pitched. On May 5, 2026, it was announced that Zerpa would undergo Tommy John surgery, ending his season.
