= Anthony Seigler =

American baseball player (born 1999)

Boston Red Sox – No. 48
- Infielder
- Born: June 20, 1999 (age 27); Fort Defiance, Arizona, U.S.
- Bats: Switch Throws: Switch

MLB debut
- July 2, 2025, for the Milwaukee Brewers

MLB statistics (through 2026 season)
- Batting average: .231
- Home runs: 3
- Runs batted in: 18
- Stats at Baseball Reference

Teams
- Milwaukee Brewers (2025); Boston Red Sox (2026–present)
Medals
Men's baseball
Representing United States
U-18 Baseball World Cup
Gold medal – first place	2017 Thunder Bay	Team

Anthony Seigler (born June 20, 1999) is an American professional baseball infielder for the Boston Red Sox of Major League Baseball (MLB). He has previously played in MLB for the Milwaukee Brewers. He made his MLB debut in 2025.

== Amateur career ==
Seigler attended Cartersville High School in Cartersville, Georgia. As a senior, he had a .421 batting average with 14 home runs. He was also a switch pitcher, posting a 1.09 earned run average (ERA) in 25 2/3 innings pitched along with 29 strikeouts. He committed to play college baseball for the Florida Gators.

Seigler caught for the U.S. national under-18 team at the 2017 U-18 Baseball World Cup, batting .182 in seven games as the Americans went undefeated.

== Professional career ==
=== New York Yankees ===
Although a switch pitcher and switch hitter with infield and outfield experience, Seigler said "I feel catching is what's going to get me to the next level." Expected to be drafted late in the first round, he was drafted 23rd overall by the New York Yankees in the 2018 Major League Baseball draft and signed with the team on June 9 for the slot-valued bonus of $2.8 million.

He made his professional debut with the rookie-level Gulf Coast League Yankees in 2018. After 12 games, he was promoted to the advanced rookie-level Pulaski Yankees, where he played another 12 games. Between the two clubs, he batted .266 with one home run and nine runs batted in (RBI). Seigler spent the 2019 season with the Single-A Charleston RiverDogs, batting .175 with six RBI over 30 games. He started the season late due to a quadricep strain, then missed nearly the last two months the season after suffering a knee fracture while catching. Seigler did not play in a game in 2020 due to the cancellation of the minor league season because of the COVID-19 pandemic. He played only 41 games for the High-A Hudson Valley Renegades in 2021 due to injuries, slashing .219/.324/.391 with four home runs and 24 RBI. Seigler threw with his left hand in his first minor league game as an outfielder.

Seigler split the 2022 campaign between Hudson Valley and the Single-A Tampa Tarpons, playing in 97 games and batting .236/.405/.369 with seven home runs, 45 RBI, and 16 stolen bases. In 2023, he played for the Double-A Somerset Patriots, and he began playing second base, though he played one game as an outfielder, again throwing as a lefty. In 67 games, he slashed .166/.333/.263 with five home runs, 27 RBI, and seven stolen bases.

Seigler returned to Somerset in 2024, playing exclusively at second base. In 118 games, he slashed .234/.350/.398 with 12 home runs, 49 RBI, and a team-leading 29 stolen bases. Seigler elected free agency following the season on November 4.

=== Milwaukee Brewers ===
On November 19, 2024, Seigler signed a minor league contract with the Milwaukee Brewers. He began the 2025 season with the Triple-A Nashville Sounds as a catcher and second baseman. In 63 Triple-A games, Seigler batted .277/.416/.465 with seven home runs, 35 RBI, and 20 stolen bases, his best offensive performance since 2018. He began hitting left-handed against left-handed pitchers, forgoing the platoon advantage. Seigler would end up going back to switch-hitting in the 2026 season.

On July 1, 2025, the Brewers selected Seigler to their 40-man roster and promoted him to the major leagues for the first time. Seigler made his MLB debut the following day, starting at third base for both games of a doubleheader. He had his first hit in the sixth inning of the second game, a single off of Dedniel Núñez of the New York Mets. Seigler made 34 appearances for Milwaukee during his rookie campaign, slashing .194/.292/.210 with five RBI and two stolen bases. Seigler was selected to the 26-man roster for the 2025 NLDS against the Chicago Cubs.

=== Boston Red Sox ===
On February 9, 2026, the Brewers traded Seigler, Caleb Durbin, Andruw Monasterio, and a compensation round draft pick in the 2026 MLB draft to the Boston Red Sox in exchange for Kyle Harrison, David Hamilton, and Shane Drohan. On June 27, Seigler hit his first career home run off of Gerrit Cole of the New York Yankees.

== Personal life ==
Seigler's father played college baseball and later taught Spanish at Seigler's high school. His father bought him both right-handed and left-handed gloves, encouraging him to be a switch-thrower. He is named after MLB player Tony Phillips, a friend of his father who lived in the Seigler house for a short time.

Seigler became the second Navajo player to play in the majors after Jacoby Ellsbury.
