= Caleb Durbin =

American baseball player (born 2000)

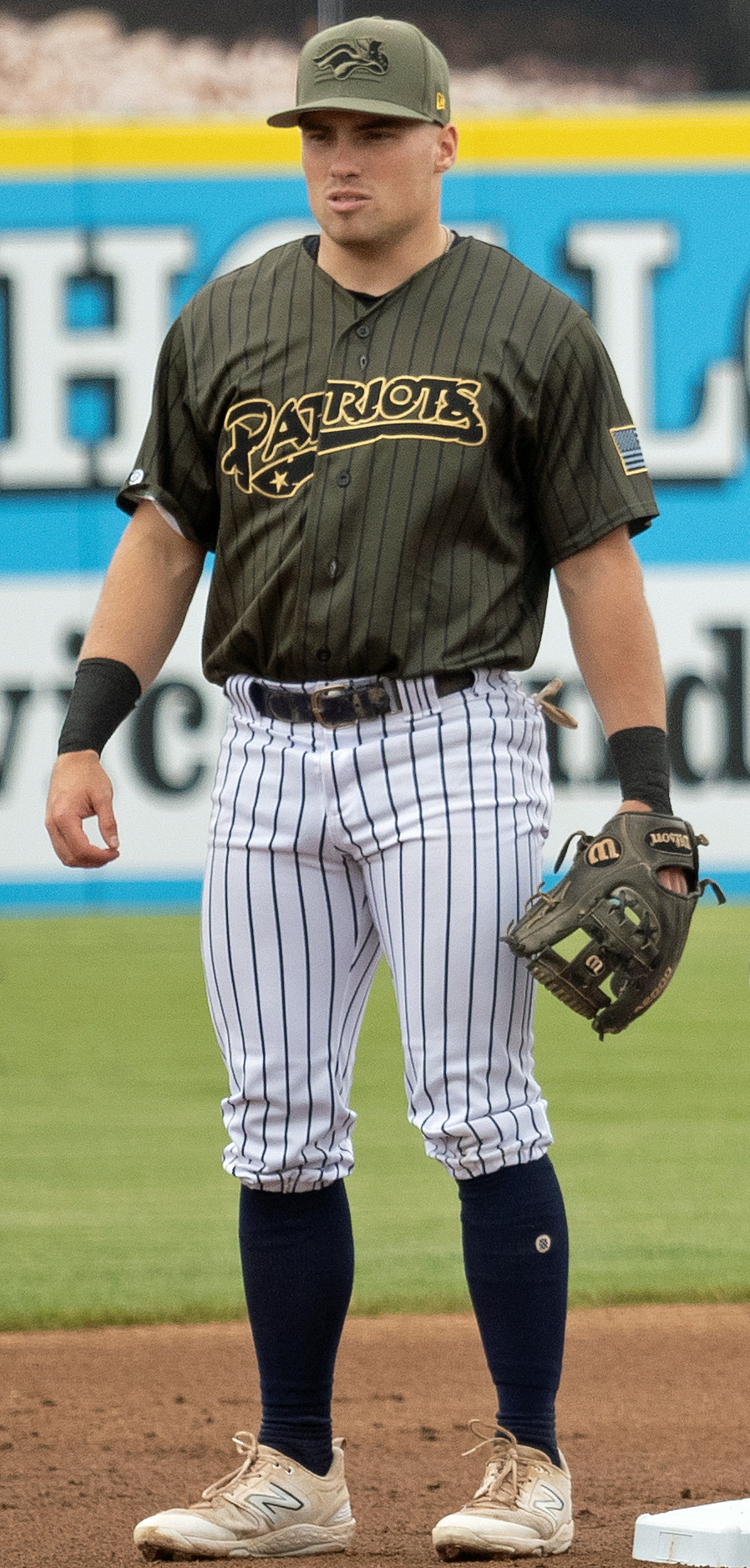
- Durbin with the Somerset Patriots in 2023

Boston Red Sox – No. 5
- Infielder
- Born: February 22, 2000 (age 26); Evanston, Illinois, U.S.
- Bats: Right Throws: Right

MLB debut
- April 18, 2025, for the Milwaukee Brewers

MLB statistics (through 2026 season)
- Batting average: .252
- Home runs: 24
- Runs batted in: 117
- Stats at Baseball Reference

Teams
- Milwaukee Brewers (2025); Boston Red Sox (2026–present)

Career highlights and awards
- Gold Glove Award (2026)

Caleb Durbin (born February 22, 2000) is an American professional baseball infielder for the Boston Red Sox of Major League Baseball (MLB). He has previously played in MLB for the Milwaukee Brewers. He made his MLB debut in 2025.

== Early life ==
Born in Evanston, Illinois, Durbin was a 3-year letter winner in baseball, 4-year letter winner in wrestling, and lettered in football at Lake Forest High School in Lake Forest, Illinois.

== College ==
Durbin played college baseball at Washington University in St. Louis while earning a degree in economics.

Durbin played collegiate summer baseball in the Northwoods League for the Rockford Rivets in 2019, and then for the Fond du Lac Dock Spiders in 2020 and 2021. In 2025, Durbin returned to Fond du Lac for a promotional night while the Brewers had an off day. He threw out the first pitch and signed autographs for fans. While in Fond du Lac, Durbin spent the night with his former host family.

== Professional career ==
=== Atlanta Braves ===
Durbin was drafted by the Atlanta Braves in the 14th round, 427th overall, of the 2021 Major League Baseball draft. He made his professional debut with the rookie-level Florida Complex League Braves. Durbin split the 2022 campaign between the Single-A Augusta GreenJackets and High-A Rome Braves, for whom he batted a combined .241/.352/.372 with eight home runs, 62 RBI, and 31 strikeouts across 105 appearances.

=== New York Yankees ===
On December 28, 2022, the Braves traded Durbin and Indigo Diaz to the New York Yankees in exchange for Lucas Luetge. He played 2023 with the High–A Hudson Valley Renegades and Double–A Somerset Patriots. After the season, he played in the Arizona Fall League.

Durbin spent the 2024 campaign with the Triple–A Scranton/Wilkes-Barre RailRiders, also briefly appearing for the Single–A Tampa Tarpons and Somerset. In 82 games for Scranton, he slashed .287/.396/.471 with 10 home runs, 60 RBI, and 29 stolen bases. Following the season, the Yankees added Durbin to their 40-man roster to protect him from the Rule 5 draft.

=== Milwaukee Brewers ===
==== 2025 ====
On December 13, 2024, the Yankees traded Durbin and Nestor Cortés Jr. to the Milwaukee Brewers in exchange for Devin Williams. He was optioned to the Triple-A Nashville Sounds to begin the 2025 season. On April 16, 2025, Durbin was promoted to the major leagues for the first time, going 2-for-4 and scoring a run. By playing in the game he became the first player ever drafted out of Washington University to play in the major leagues. He hit his first MLB home run on April 21 off Robbie Ray of the San Francisco Giants. On June 7, Durbin hit a walk-off home run off of David Morgan to defeat the Padres, 4–3. He made 136 appearances for Milwaukee during his rookie campaign, batting .256/.334/.387 with 11 home runs, 53 RBI, and 18 stolen bases. On October 23, it was announced that Durbin would require arthroscopic elbow surgery.

=== Boston Red Sox ===
==== 2026 ====
On February 9, 2026, the Brewers traded Durbin, Andruw Monasterio, Anthony Seigler, and a compensation round draft pick in the 2026 MLB draft to the Boston Red Sox in exchange for Kyle Harrison, David Hamilton, and Shane Drohan. On August 4th, Durbin hit his first career grand slam off of Chicago White Sox pitcher Davis Martin. In 2026, Caleb Durbin won the AL Gold Glove Award for his defense at third base, the first of his career.

== Personal life ==
Durbin's father, Regis Durbin, and older brother, Regis Durbin Jr., were both collegiate wrestlers at Northwestern University.

Durbin's college roommate, Justin Hardy, died of stomach cancer in 2022. Since then Durbin has been a supporter of the HardyStrong Foundation, which raises awareness and funds for stomach cancer research.

Growing up in the suburbs of Chicago, Durbin grew up a fan of both the Chicago Cubs and Chicago White Sox.
