= Andruw Monasterio =

Venezuelan baseball player (born 1997)

Boston Red Sox – No. 32
- Infielder
- Born: May 30, 1997 (age 29); Caracas, Venezuela
- Bats: Right Throws: Right

MLB debut
- May 28, 2023, for the Milwaukee Brewers

MLB statistics (through 2026 season)
- Batting average: .243
- Home runs: 14
- Runs batted in: 102
- Stats at Baseball Reference

Teams
- Milwaukee Brewers (2023–2025); Boston Red Sox (2026–present)

Andruw José Monasterio (born May 30, 1997) is a Venezuelan professional baseball infielder for the Boston Red Sox of Major League Baseball (MLB). He has previously played in MLB for the Milwaukee Brewers.

== Career ==
=== Chicago Cubs ===
In 2014, at age 17, Monasterio tried out for the Chicago Cubs at the organization's Venezuelan academy. The Cubs were impressed and signed him to a contract on March 7, 2014. He made his professional debut with the Venezuelan Summer League Cubs. In 2015, Monasterio played in 42 games for the rookie-level Arizona League Cubs, hitting .252/.346/.348 with one home run and 16 RBI.

Originally a shortstop, Monasterio began seeing regular time as a second baseman starting in the 2016 season with the Single-A South Bend Cubs. Playing in 65 games between South Bend and the Low-A Eugene Emeralds, he hit .247/.294/.308 with one home run, 23 RBI, and 8 stolen bases. In 2017, Monasterio played in 84 contests split between South Bend and the High-A Myrtle Beach Pelicans, posting a .270/.341/.346 batting line with one home run, 28 RBI, and 8 stolen bases.

Monasterio began the 2018 season with Myrtle Beach, playing in 109 games and hitting .263/.359/.336 with career-highs in home runs (3) and RBI (36).

=== Washington Nationals ===
On August 21, 2018, Monasterio was traded to the Washington Nationals in exchange for Daniel Murphy and cash considerations. Monasterio was assigned to the Potomac Nationals of the High-A Carolina League, where he excelled, hitting .308 with 5 RBI and 2 stolen bases in 13 games.

Baseball scout Adam McInturff of 2080 Baseball described Monasterio in 2018 as a "high-floor prospect" with "above-average" defense, but not much power on offense.

=== Cleveland Indians ===
On November 30, 2018, Jefry Rodríguez, Daniel Johnson, and a player to be named later were traded to the Cleveland Indians in exchange for Yan Gomes. On December 17, Monasterio was sent to Cleveland as the unnamed player. Monasterio spent the 2019 season with the Double-A Akron RubberDucks. Although he missed brief time with an oblique injury, Monasterio played in 70 games and batted .217/.279/.253 with one home run and 11 RBI.

Monasterio did not play in a game in 2020 due to the cancellation of the minor league season because of the COVID-19 pandemic. He elected free agency following the season on November 2, 2020. On November 9, Monasterio re-signed with the team on a minor league contract. In 2021, Monasterio played in 107 games split between Akron and the Triple-A Columbus Clippers, hitting a cumulative .287/.371/.442 with 8 home runs, 61 RBI, and 7 stolen bases. He elected free agency following the season on November 7, 2021.

=== Milwaukee Brewers ===
On November 10, 2021, Monasterio signed a minor league contract with the Milwaukee Brewers organization. On August 1, 2022, while playing for the Double-A Biloxi Shuckers, Monasterio hit a walk-off grand slam to defeat the Montgomery Biscuits in 11 innings. In 110 games split between Biloxi and the Triple-A Nashville Sounds, he slashed .271/.364/.406 with 9 home runs, 44 RBI, and 15 stolen bases.

Monasterio returned to Nashville to begin the 2023 season, where he played in 42 games and hit .274/.410/.400 with 4 home runs, 19 RBI, and 11 stolen bases.

On May 27, 2023, Monasterio was selected to the 40-man roster and promoted to the major leagues for the first time after Willy Adames was placed on the concussion list. He made his MLB debut on May 28, and recorded his first career hit two days later on his 26th birthday. On June 4, Monasterio hit his first major league home run, a three–run shot off of Ben Lively of the Cincinnati Reds. Just over a month later on July 16, Monasterio came up with his first career go-ahead RBI with a single off Reds All-Star closer Alexis Diaz in the top of the 8th inning to take a 4-3 lead. He finished the season appearing in 92 games, had 282 at bats, and slashed .259/.330/.348 with three home runs and 27 RBI.

After making the Brewers' Opening Day roster and starting on Opening Day, Monasterio was optioned to Triple-A Nashville after playing just four games over the first two weeks of the 2024 season. He was brought back up on April 19 but was again optioned on April 22 without seeing a plate appearance. In 59 appearances for Milwaukee, Monasterio slashed .208/.303/.272 with one home run, 16 RBI, and six stolen bases.

Monasterio was optioned to Triple-A Nashville to begin the 2025 season. He was called up to Brewers on May 9. On July 12, he scored the winning walk-off run of a 6-5 comeback victory over the Washington Nationals amid a mid-season seven-game winning streak for the Brewers. Monasterio made 68 appearances for Milwaukee during the regular season, batting .270/.319/.437 with four home runs, 16 RBI, and two stolen bases.

=== Boston Red Sox ===
On February 9, 2026, the Brewers traded Monasterio, Caleb Durbin, Anthony Seigler, and a compensation round draft pick in the 2026 MLB draft to the Boston Red Sox in exchange for Kyle Harrison, David Hamilton, and Shane Drohan. On April 25, Monasterio hit his first career grand slam off of Baltimore Orioles pitcher Keegan Akin in a 17-1 win.
