= Andrew Vaughn =

American baseball player (born 1998)

- Vaughn during the 2026 World Series victory parade

Milwaukee Brewers – No. 28
- First baseman
- Born: April 3, 1998 (age 28); Santa Rosa, California, U.S.
- Bats: Right Throws: Right

MLB debut
- April 2, 2021, for the Chicago White Sox

MLB statistics (through 2026 season)
- Batting average: .259
- Home runs: 92
- Runs batted in: 382
- Stats at Baseball Reference

Teams
- Chicago White Sox (2021–2025); Milwaukee Brewers (2025–present)

Career highlights and awards
- World Series champion (2026); Golden Spikes Award (2018)

Andrew Clayton Vaughn (born April 3, 1998) is an American professional baseball first baseman for the Milwaukee Brewers of Major League Baseball (MLB). He has previously played in MLB for the Chicago White Sox. Vaughn played college baseball for the California Golden Bears, and won the Golden Spikes Award in 2018. He was selected by the White Sox in the first round of the 2019 MLB draft and made his MLB debut in 2021.

== Amateur career ==
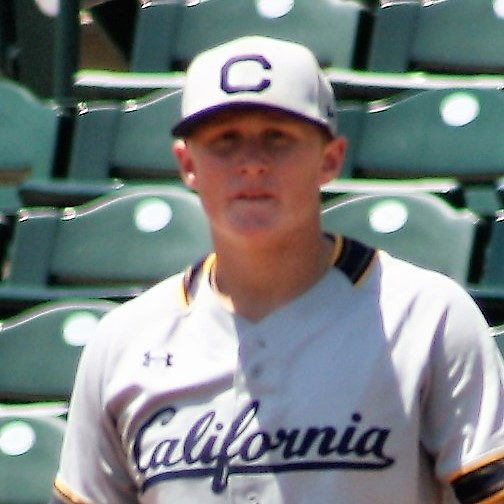
Vaughn with the Cal Golden Bears in 2019

Vaughn attended Maria Carrillo High School in Santa Rosa, California. Playing for the baseball team, he batted .380 with 29 doubles, three triples, one home run, 76 runs batted in (RBIs), 49 walks, and 15 strikeouts in 332 at bats. As a pitcher, he had 17–6 win–loss record with a 2.05 earned run average and 166 strikeouts.

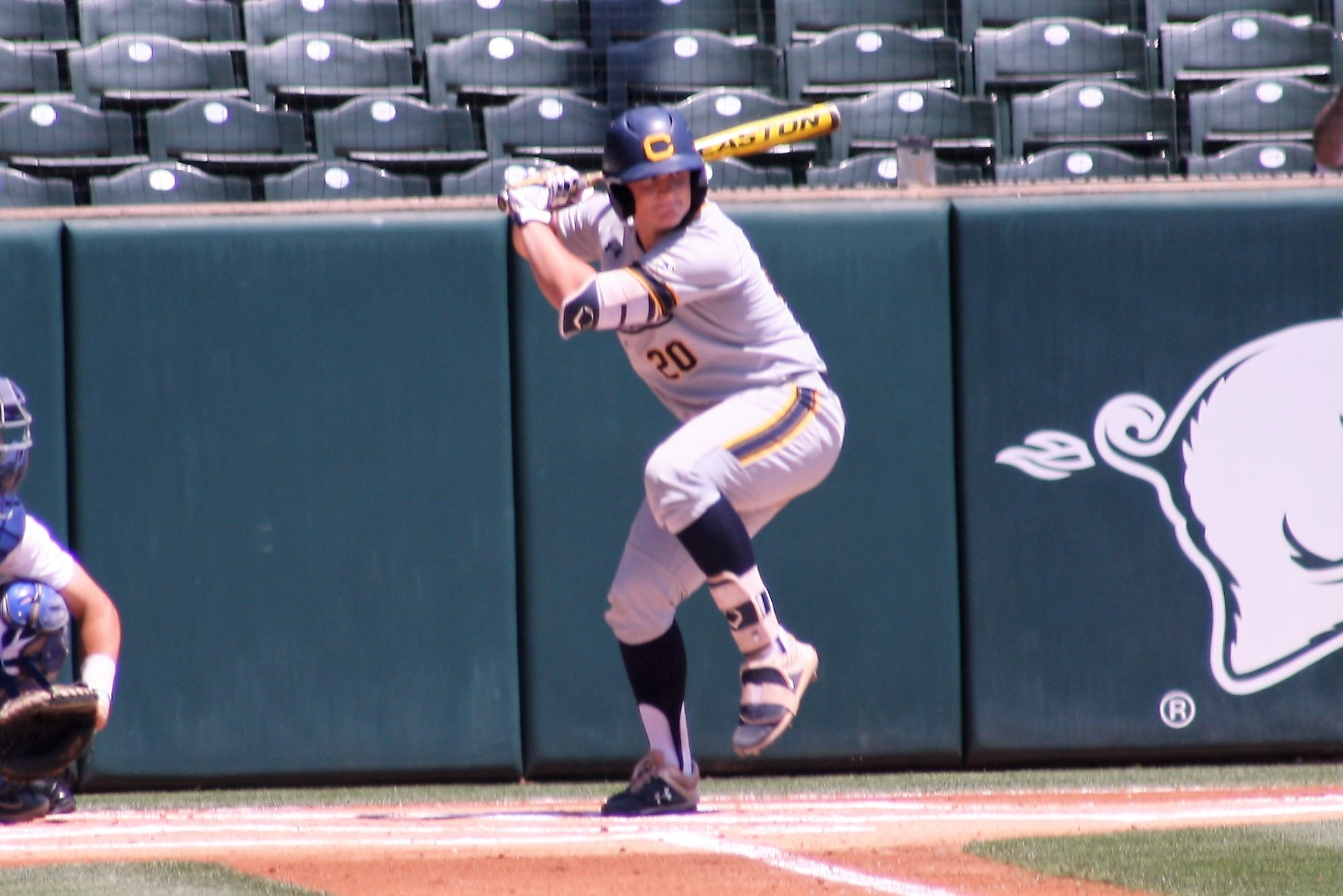
Vaughn batting for Cal in 2019

Vaughn enrolled at the University of California, Berkeley to play college baseball for the California Golden Bears. As a freshman, Vaughn played first base and made ten appearances as a pitcher. He hit 12 home runs while batting .349/.414/.555 and won the Pac-12 Conference Freshman of the Year Award. He played collegiate summer baseball in 2017 for the Victoria HarbourCats of the West Coast League.

As a sophomore in 2018, Vaughn hit 23 home runs batting .402/.531/.819. Perfect Game/Rawlings named him their National Player of the Year, and he won the Pac-12 Conference Baseball Player of the Year Award and Golden Spikes Award. After the 2018 season, he played collegiate summer baseball with the Wareham Gatemen of the Cape Cod Baseball League. In 2019, his junior year, he hit .374/.539/.704 with 15 home runs and 50 RBIs in 52 games.

== Professional career ==
=== Chicago White Sox ===
Considered a top prospect for the 2019 Major League Baseball (MLB) draft, Vaughn was selected by the Chicago White Sox with the third overall pick. Vaughn was selected in the draft along with six other Cal teammates. Vaughn signed with the White Sox for $7.2 million.

The White Sox first assigned Vaughn to the Rookie-level Arizona League White Sox, and promoted him to the Kannapolis Intimidators of the Single–A South Atlantic League after hitting .600/.625/.933 with a home run, two doubles, and four RBI in three Arizona League games. Vaughn was promoted again to the Winston-Salem Dash of the High–A Carolina League after batting .253/.388/.410 with two home runs, seven doubles, 11 RBI, and 14 runs scored in 23 games with Kannapolis. With the Dash he batted .252/.349/.411. After the season, on October 10, he was selected for the United States national baseball team in the 2019 WBSC Premier 12. Vaughn did not play in a game in 2020 due to the cancellation of the minor league season because of the COVID-19 pandemic.

The White Sox invited Vaughn to spring training as a non-roster player in 2021. Following an injury to left fielder Eloy Jiménez, the White Sox began to experiment with playing Vaughn in left field. The White Sox added Vaughn to their 40-man roster to include him on their Opening Day roster. Vaughn made his MLB debut on April 2 as the starting left fielder against the Los Angeles Angels. On May 12, Vaughn hit his first major league home run off of J. A. Happ of the Minnesota Twins. Overall in 2021, Vaughn hit .235 in 127 games with 15 home runs and 48 RBI.

In 2022, Vaughn batted .271/.321/.429. On defense he played in right field, he had the worst outs above average (OAA) rate in major league baseball, at -16.

In 2025, Vaughn appeared in 48 games, 31 at first base and 17 as designated hitter. He batted .189/.218/.314 with five home runs and 19 RBI. On May 23, the White Sox optioned Vaughn to the Triple-A Charlotte Knights.

=== Milwaukee Brewers ===
On June 13, 2025, the White Sox traded Vaughn to the Milwaukee Brewers in exchange for Aaron Civale and cash considerations. The cash was included to cover the difference between Civale and Vaughn's salaries. After acquiring Vaughn, the Brewers immediately optioned him to their Triple-A affiliate, the Nashville Sounds. In 16 games with Nashville, Vaughn batted .259 with seven extra base hits and 16 RBI.

On July 7, 2025, Vaughn was promoted to the Brewers active roster to take the place of the injured Rhys Hoskins. Vaughn's first 15 games with the club were highly successful, including five home runs and 21 RBI. He credited the improved performance to better swing discipline, after he had been told by the Brewers that he would not play if he continued to chase bad pitches. In 64 games with the Brewers in 2025, Vaughn slashed .308/.375/.493 with nine home runs and 46 RBI.
