= Isaac Collins (baseball) =

American baseball player (born 1997)

Kansas City Royals – No. 1
- Left fielder / Second baseman
- Born: July 22, 1997 (age 29); Maple Grove, Minnesota, U.S.
- Bats: Switch Throws: Right

MLB debut
- September 8, 2024, for the Milwaukee Brewers

MLB statistics (through 2026 season)
- Batting average: .233
- Home runs: 15
- Runs batted in: 94
- Stats at Baseball Reference

Teams
- Milwaukee Brewers (2024–2025); Kansas City Royals (2026–present)

Isaac Michael Collins (born July 22, 1997) is an American professional baseball left fielder and second baseman for the Kansas City Royals of Major League Baseball (MLB). He has previously played in MLB for the Milwaukee Brewers. He made his MLB debut in 2024.

== Amateur career ==
A native of Maple Grove, Minnesota, Collins graduated from Maple Grove Senior High School in 2016. He attended Creighton University and played college baseball for the Creighton Bluejays. Collins played collegiate summer baseball for the Duluth Huskies of the Northwoods League in 2017 and for the Wareham Gatemen of the Cape Cod Baseball League in 2018.

== Professional career ==
=== Colorado Rockies ===
After Collins’ junior season at Creighton, the Colorado Rockies selected him in the ninth round, with the 279th overall pick, of the 2019 Major League Baseball draft. He made his professional debut with the Low–A Boise Hawks, hitting .257 with 17 RBI over 37 games. Collins did not play in a game in 2020 due to the cancellation of the minor league season because of the COVID-19 pandemic.

Collins returned to action in 2021 with the Single–A Fresno Grizzlies and High–A Spokane Indians. In 95 games split between the two affiliates, he accumulated a .308/.407/.475 batting line with nine home runs, 54 RBI, and 21 stolen bases. Collins spent the 2022 campaign with the Double–A Hartford Yard Goats, playing in 111 games and batting .221/.337/.347 with five home runs, 32 RBI, and 30 stolen bases.

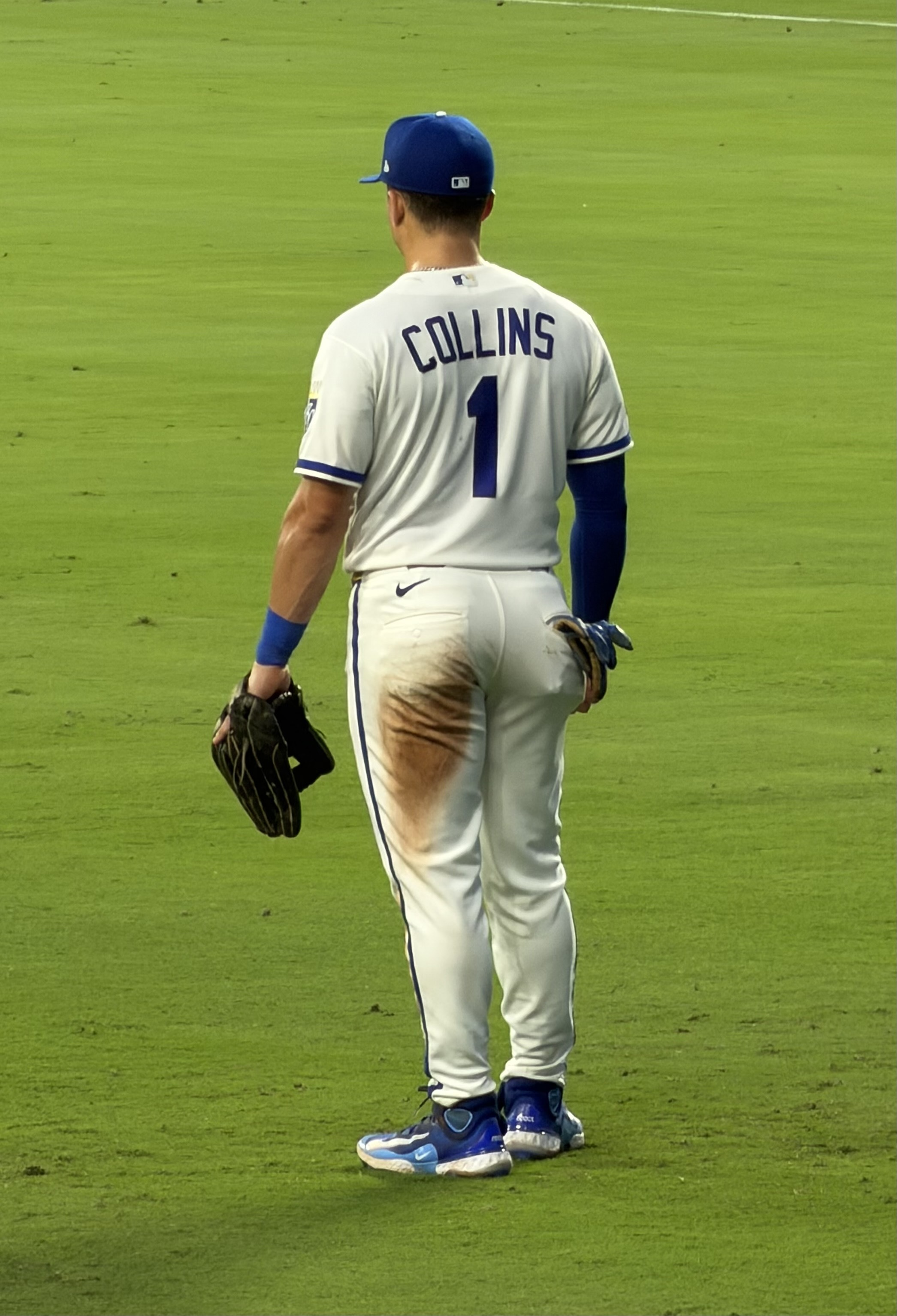
Isaac Collins in left field for the Royals in a game against the Twins at Kauffman Stadium in August 2026

=== Milwaukee Brewers ===
On December 7, 2022, Collins was selected by the Milwaukee Brewers in the minor league phase of the Rule 5 draft. He spent 2023 with the Double–A Biloxi Shuckers, and received a three–game cup of coffee with the Triple–A Nashville Sounds at the end of the season. In 93 games for Biloxi, Collins slashed .269/.424/.431 with 10 home runs, 44 RBI, and 29 stolen bases.

Collins began the 2024 season with Nashville, hitting .273/.386/.475 with career–highs in home runs (14) and RBI (76) over 113 games. On September 8, 2024, Collins was selected to the 40-man roster and promoted to the major leagues for the first time. In 11 appearances for Milwaukee during his rookie campaign, Collins went 2-for-17 (.118) with one stolen base and two walks.

On April 30, 2025, Collins hit his first career home run off of Tyler Gilbert of the Chicago White Sox. Collins was named the National League Rookie of the Month for July after going 25-for-78 (.321) with four stolen bases and eleven walks. On August 10, Collins hit a walk-off home run off of Edwin Diaz to defeat the New York Mets 7-6 at American Family Field. The next day, he was named the National League Player of the Week for August 4–10, a span in which he batted .476 (10–21) with six runs, two home runs, eight RBI, and an OPS of 1.529. Collins made 130 total appearances for Milwaukee, slashing .263/.368/.411 with nine home runs, 54 RBI, and 16 stolen bases. On November 12, Collins was named to MLB Pipeline's 2025 All-Rookie First Team.

=== Kansas City Royals ===
On December 14, 2025, Collins and Nick Mears were traded to the Kansas City Royals in exchange for Ángel Zerpa.

== See also ==
- Rule 5 draft results

Awards
Preceded by Jacob Misiorowski	National League Rookie of the Month; July 2025	Succeeded by Jakob Marsee
