= Aaron Civale =

American baseball player (born 1995)

- Civale with the Cleveland Indians in 2019

Free agent
- Pitcher
- Born: June 12, 1995 (age 31); East Windsor, Connecticut, U.S.
- Bats: Right Throws: Right

MLB debut
- June 22, 2019, for the Cleveland Indians

MLB statistics (through 2026 season)
- Win–loss record: 49–52
- Earned run average: 4.15
- Strikeouts: 756
- Stats at Baseball Reference

Teams
- Cleveland Indians / Guardians (2019–2023); Tampa Bay Rays (2023–2024); Milwaukee Brewers (2024–2025); Chicago White Sox (2025); Chicago Cubs (2025); Athletics (2026); Chicago Cubs (2026)

Aaron James Civale (/sɪˈvɑːliː/ sih-VAH-lee; born June 12, 1995) is an American professional baseball pitcher who is a free agent. He has played in Major League Baseball (MLB) for the for the Cleveland Indians / Guardians, Tampa Bay Rays, Milwaukee Brewers, Chicago White Sox, Chicago Cubs and Athletics. Civale played college baseball at Northeastern University, and was selected by the Cleveland Indians in the third round of the 2016 MLB draft. He made his MLB debut in 2019 with the Indians.

== Amateur career ==
A native of East Windsor, Connecticut, Civale attended Loomis Chaffee School in Windsor, Connecticut. He played college baseball at Northeastern University. Civale was honored as Co-Pitcher of the Year in the Colonial Athletic Association after going 9–3 with a 1.73 ERA for the Huskies. While playing for the Huskies, he pitched an exhibition game in Florida against the Boston Red Sox of Major League Baseball (MLB) at JetBlue Park. Before this start, Civale was a relief pitcher for the Huskies for two years. In 2015, he played collegiate summer baseball with the Hyannis Harbor Hawks of the Cape Cod Baseball League, where he was a league all-star, and received the Outstanding New England Prospect award.

== Professional career ==
=== Cleveland Indians / Guardians ===
The Cleveland Indians selected Civale in the third round of the 2016 MLB draft. He signed and spent 2016 with the Mahoning Valley Scrappers where he was 0–2 with a 1.67 ERA and 0.82 WHIP in 13 starts. In 2017, he played for both the Lake County Captains and Lynchburg Hillcats, posting a combined 13–6 record with a 3.28 ERA in 27 total starts between the two teams, and in 2018, he pitched with the Akron RubberDucks where he went 5–7 with a 3.89 ERA in 21 starts. He returned to Akron to begin 2019. Civale was promoted to the Columbus Clippers on June 6. He made seven starts between Double-A Akron and Triple-A Columbus going 5–0 with a 2.85 ERA before being called up.

On June 21, 2019, his contract was selected and Civale was called up to the major leagues for the first time. In his first game, he went 6 innings with 6 strikeouts against the Detroit Tigers and winning the game 2–0 after Brad Hand saved his 22nd game. He became the 10th Major League pitcher (and first for the Indians) since at least 1908 to pitch at least 5 2/3 innings and allow 2 runs or fewer in each of his first six career appearances as a starter.

In 2020 he was 4–6 with a 4.74 ERA. He led the AL in hits allowed (82) and highest batting average against (.282). On June 23, 2021, Civale was placed on the injured list with a middle finger sprain. At the time of his placement, Civale led the MLB in wins with 10. On July 26, Civale was transferred to the 60-day injured list. Civale returned in September and on October 3, he was the winning pitcher in Cleveland's final game under their Indians nickname, pitching six scoreless innings against the Texas Rangers. He finished the 2021 season with a 12–5 record and a 3.84 ERA in 21 starts.

On January 13, 2023, Civale agreed to a one-year, $2.6 million contract with the Guardians, avoiding salary arbitration.

=== Tampa Bay Rays ===
On July 31, 2023, the Guardians traded Civale to the Tampa Bay Rays for infield prospect Kyle Manzardo. In 10 starts down the stretch, he compiled a 2–3 record and 5.36 ERA with 58 strikeouts across 45 1/3 innings pitched.

Civale was signed to a one-year deal worth $4.9 million for 2024. He made 17 starts for Tampa Bay, posting a 2–6 record and 5.07 ERA with 84 strikeouts across 87 innings.

=== Milwaukee Brewers ===
On July 3, 2024, the Rays traded Civale to the Milwaukee Brewers in exchange for Gregory Barrios. He had a 6-3 record and a 3.53 ERA in 14 starts for Milwaukee.

On June 11, 2025, with the impending promotion of Jacob Misiorowski, the Brewers moved Civale from the starting rotation to the bullpen. Civale, who had never pitched out of the bullpen in his major league career, subsequently requested a trade to a team that would use him as a starting pitcher. In 5 starts for Milwaukee in 2025, he had logged a 1-2 record and 4.91 ERA with 19 strikeouts over 22 innings of work, a low total that was impacted by a left hamstring strain injury in his first start of the year.

=== Chicago White Sox ===
On June 13, 2025, the Brewers traded Civale and cash considerations to the Chicago White Sox in exchange for Andrew Vaughn. The cash was included to cover the difference between Civale and Vaughn's salaries. In 13 starts for Chicago, Civale logged a 2-7 record and 5.37 ERA with 55 strikeouts over 67 innings of work.

=== Chicago Cubs ===
On August 31, 2025, Civale was claimed off waivers by the Chicago Cubs. Civale made five appearances for the Cubs, registering a 1-0 record and 2.08 ERA with 14 strikeouts and one save over 13 innings of work.

=== Athletics ===
On February 10, 2026, Civale signed a one-year, $6 million contract with the Athletics. He made 16 appearances (including 15 starts) for the team, compiling a 5–7 record and 5.42 ERA with 58 strikeouts across 74 2/3 innings pitched. Civale was designated for assignment by the Athletics on July 15.

=== Chicago Cubs (second stint) ===
On July 18, 2026, the Athletics traded Civale and cash considerations to the Chicago Cubs in exchange for Aiden Moffett.
