= Nick Mears =

American baseball player (born 1996)

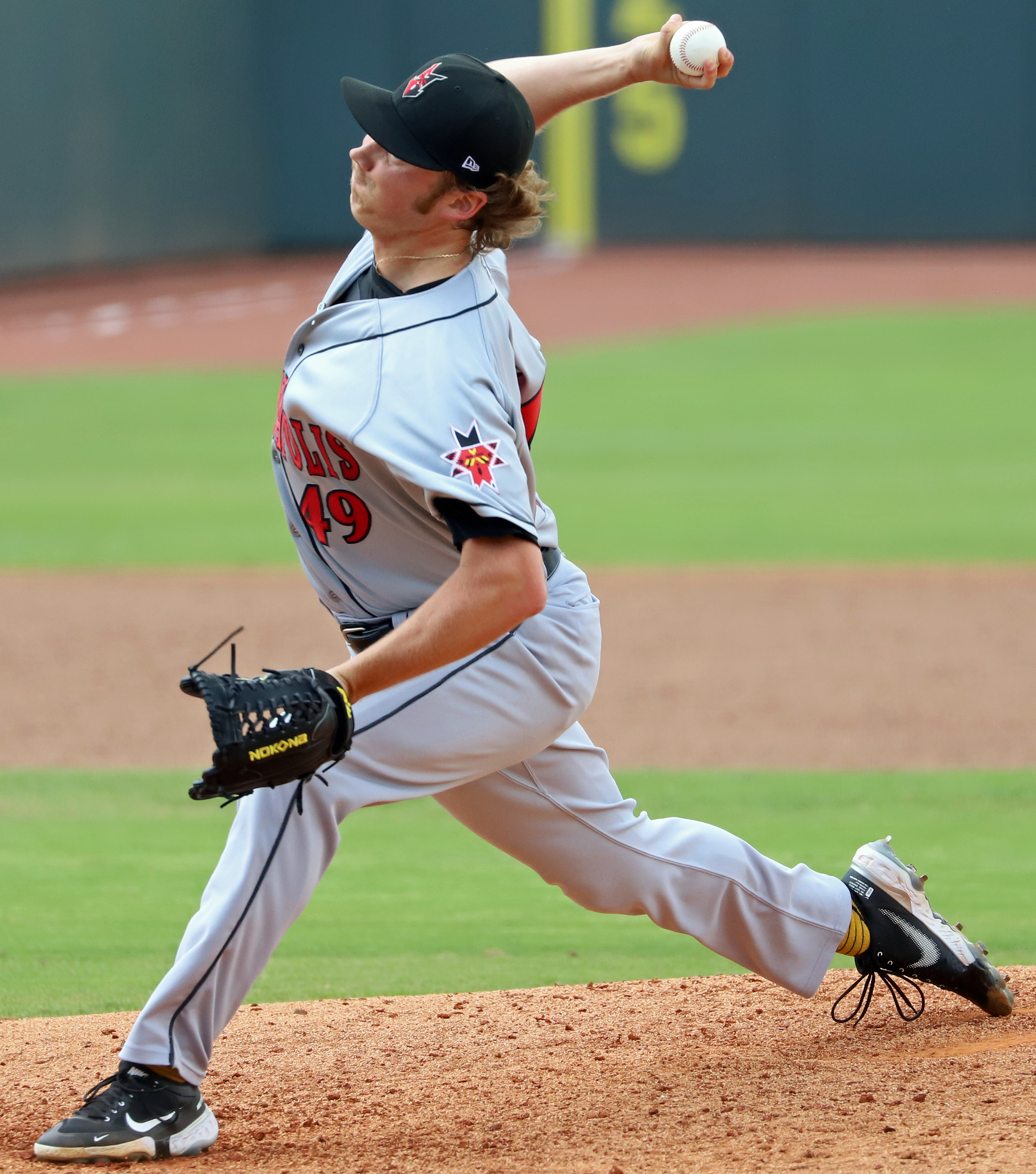
- Mears with the Indianapolis Indians in 2021

Free agent
- Pitcher
- Born: October 7, 1996 (age 30); Sacramento, California, U.S.
- Bats: Right Throws: Right

MLB debut
- August 8, 2020, for the Pittsburgh Pirates

MLB statistics (through 2026 season)
- Win–loss record: 9–12
- Earned run average: 4.66
- Strikeouts: 189
- Stats at Baseball Reference

Teams
- Pittsburgh Pirates (2020–2022); Colorado Rockies (2023–2024); Milwaukee Brewers (2024–2025); Kansas City Royals (2026)

Nicolaus Tanner Mears (born October 7, 1996) is an American professional baseball pitcher who is a free agent. He has previously played in Major League Baseball (MLB) for the Pittsburgh Pirates, Colorado Rockies, Milwaukee Brewers, and Kansas City Royals.

== Career ==
=== Amateur career ===
Mears attended Rocklin High School and played college baseball at Sacramento City College. In the summers of 2017 and 2018, he played summer league baseball for the Willmar Stingers of the Northwoods League.

=== Pittsburgh Pirates ===
Mears signed with the Pittsburgh Pirates as an undrafted free agent on August 22, 2018. Mears reached the Double-A Altoona Curve in his first full professional season, though he spent the bulk of the season with the High-A Bradenton Marauders. Across three levels in 2019, Mears threw 46 2/3 innings, striking out 69 while walking just 18, maintaining a 3.28 ERA while being used exclusively out of the bullpen.

Mears was called up to the majors for the first time on August 8, 2020 and made his major league debut that night, pitching one inning, allowing one run, against the Detroit Tigers. Mears made four appearances with the Pirates that season, throwing five innings and giving up three runs.

Mears began the 2021 season at Pittsburgh's alternate training site, and joined the Triple-A Indianapolis Indians when their season began in May. Recalled to the Pirates for the first time on May 26, he didn't make an appearance until his fourth stint with the major league team, which began on July 20.

Mears was placed on the 60-day injured list to begin the year on March 15, 2022, after undergoing arthroscopic surgery on his right elbow. He was activated on August 20, and optioned to Triple–A Indianapolis. On December 18, Mears was designated for assignment following the acquisition of Connor Joe.

=== Colorado Rockies ===
On December 23, 2022, Mears was claimed off waivers by the Texas Rangers. Four days later, Mears was designated for assignment to make room for free-agent signing Nathan Eovaldi.

On January 6, 2023, Mears was claimed off waivers by the Colorado Rockies. He was optioned to the Triple-A Albuquerque Isotopes to begin the season. In 16 games for the Rockies, Mears posted a 3.72 ERA with 21 strikeouts.

Mears made 41 appearances out of the bullpen for Colorado in 2024, registering a 5.56 ERA with 57 strikeouts across 45 1/3 innings pitched.

=== Milwaukee Brewers ===
On July 27, 2024, Mears was traded to the Milwaukee Brewers in exchange for Bradley Blalock and Yujanyer Herrera. In 13 appearances down the stretch for Milwaukee, he struggled to an 0-1 record and 7.30 ERA with 18 strikeouts across 12 1/3 innings pitched.

Mears made 63 appearances out of the bullpen for the Brewers in 2025, compiling a 5-3 record and 3.49 ERA with 46 strikeouts and one save across 56 1/3 innings pitched.

=== Kansas City Royals ===
On December 14, 2025, Mears and Isaac Collins were traded to the Kansas City Royals in exchange for Ángel Zerpa. On May 29, 2026, Mears was placed on the injured list due to a right shoulder impingement. He was transferred to the 60-day injured list on July 14. On November 20, Mears was non-tendered by the Royals and became a free agent.
