= Rob Zastryzny =

Canadian-American baseball player (born 1992)

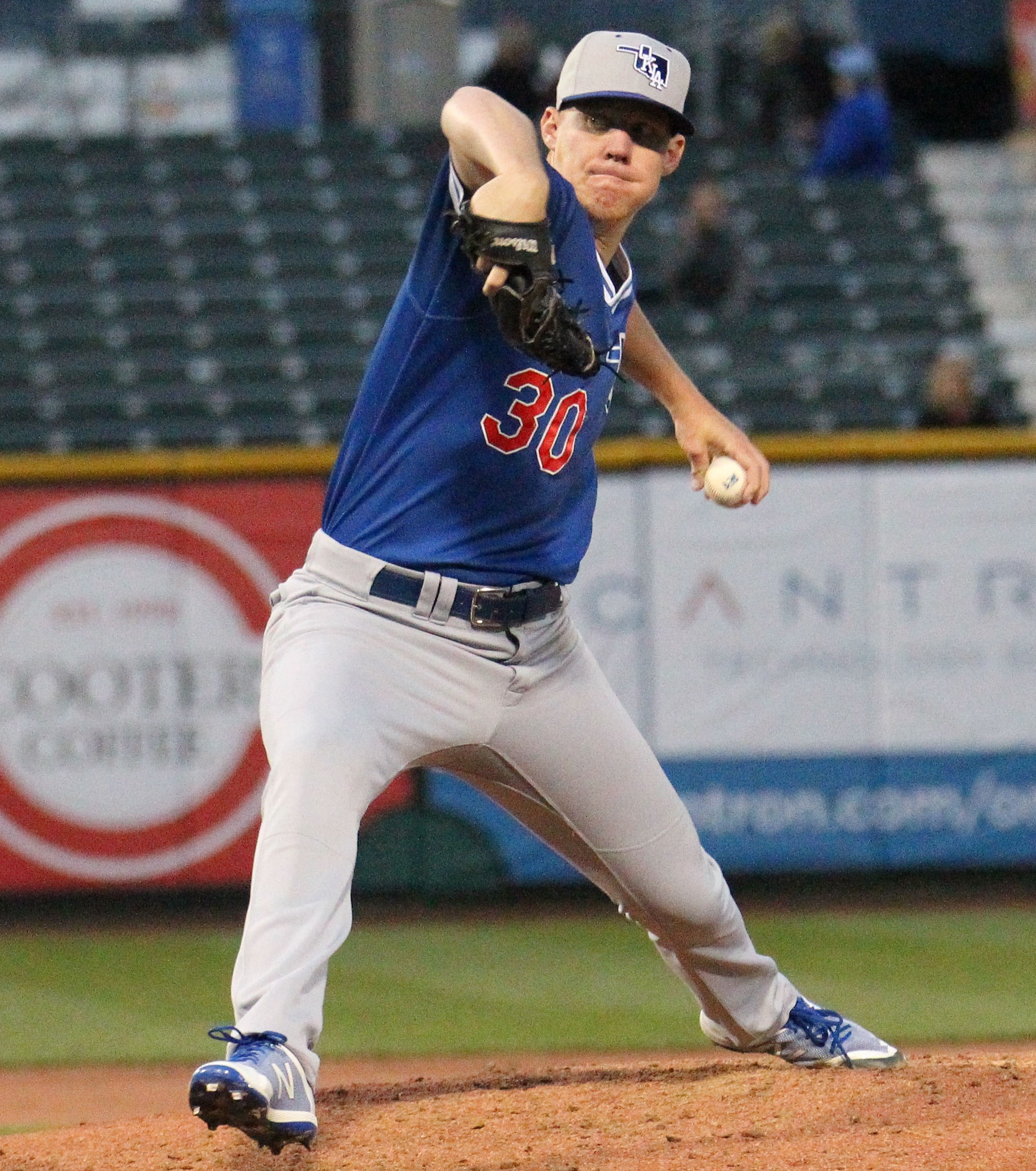
- Zastryzny pitching for the Oklahoma City Dodgers in 2019

Free agent
- Pitcher
- Born: March 26, 1992 (age 34); Edmonton, Alberta, Canada
- Bats: Right Throws: Left

MLB debut
- August 19, 2016, for the Chicago Cubs

MLB statistics (through 2025 season)
- Win–loss record: 6–1
- Earned run average: 3.84
- Strikeouts: 74
- Stats at Baseball Reference

Teams
- Chicago Cubs (2016–2018); New York Mets (2022); Los Angeles Angels (2022); Pittsburgh Pirates (2023); Milwaukee Brewers (2024–2025)

Robert John Zastryzny (za-STRIZ-nee born March 26, 1992) is a Canadian-American professional baseball pitcher who is a free agent. He has previously played in Major League Baseball (MLB) for the Chicago Cubs, New York Mets, Los Angeles Angels, Pittsburgh Pirates, and Milwaukee Brewers. He played college baseball for the Missouri Tigers.

== Early life ==
Zastryzny was born in Edmonton, Alberta, Canada. His family moved to Corpus Christi, Texas, when he was one year old. Zastryzny holds dual Canadian-American citizenship, and was homeschooled.

== Career ==
=== Amateur career ===
Zastryzny played for the Calallen High School baseball team as a pitcher and first baseman, but began to focus on pitching by his junior year. He compiled a 26–4 win–loss record and an 0.71 earned run average (ERA) and 299 strikeouts, including a 17–1 record and an 0.20 ERA and 198 strikeouts in his senior year. He pitched a perfect game during his junior year.

After graduating from Calallen, Zastryzny enrolled at the University of Missouri, where he played college baseball for the Missouri Tigers. In three years at Missouri, Zastryzny had a 9–19 win–loss record and a 3.79 ERA with 228 strikeouts, the eighth-most in Tigers history.

=== Chicago Cubs ===
The Chicago Cubs selected Zastryzny in the second round, with the 41st overall selection, of the 2013 MLB draft. He began his professional career with the Boise Hawks of the Low–A Northwest League, and was promoted to the Kane County Cougars of the Single–A Midwest League. He pitched for the Daytona Cubs of the High–A Florida State League in 2014. In 2015, he pitched for the Tennessee Smokies of the Double–A Southern League. After the 2015 regular season, the Cubs assigned Zastryzny to the Mesa Solar Sox of the Arizona Fall League.

Zastryzny began the 2016 season with Tennessee, and received a mid-season promotion to the Iowa Cubs of the Triple–A Pacific Coast League. On August 19, the Cubs promoted him to the major leagues. Zastryzny made 11 appearances for the Cubs to finish 2016, and finished 1-0 with a 1.13 ERA. The Cubs would eventually win the 2016 World Series, ending their 108-year drought. Zastryzny won his first World Series title. Zastryzny was added to the roster for the 2016 National League Championship Series, replacing Tommy La Stella who had been on the roster for the 2016 National League Division Series. Although eligible to play, he did not appear in any NLCS games. Zastryzny was replaced by Kyle Schwarber on the roster for the 2016 World Series. He was designated for assignment on September 1, 2018. He was outrighted to Iowa on September 3. Zastryzny was released by the Cubs organization on March 25, 2019.

=== Los Angeles Dodgers ===
On March 26, 2019, Zastryzny signed a minor league contract with the Los Angeles Dodgers organization. In 23 games (19 starts) split between the Double–A Tulsa Drillers and Triple–A Oklahoma City Dodgers, he compiled a 4–8 record and 5.58 ERA with 104 strikeouts across 113 innings pitched. After the season, on October 8, he was selected for the Canada national baseball team at the 2019 WBSC Premier12. Zastryzny elected free agency following the season on November 4.

=== Baltimore Orioles ===
On November 26, 2019, Zastryzny signed a minor league deal with the Baltimore Orioles organization. Zastryzny did not play in a game in 2020 due to the cancellation of the minor league season because of the COVID-19 pandemic. He spent most of the major league season on the team's 60-man alternate training site pool, but was released by the Orioles organization on September 18.

=== Miami Marlins ===
On March 26, 2021, Zastryzny signed with the Long Island Ducks of the Atlantic League of Professional Baseball. On May 4, prior to the 2021 ALPB season, Zastryzny's contract was purchased by the Miami Marlins. Zastryzny was assigned to the Triple-A Jacksonville Jumbo Shrimp. In 24 games for Jacksonville, he registered a 3.68 ERA with 41 strikeouts and 2 saves in 29 1/3 innings pitched. He elected free agency following the season on November 7.

=== New York Mets ===
On November 29, 2021, Zastryzny signed a minor league deal with the New York Mets. On August 20, 2022, Zastryzny's contract was selected from Triple-A and was promoted to the major league roster. On August 21, Zastryzyny was optioned to the Triple–A Syracuse Mets. On August 22, Zastryzyny was designated for assignment.

=== Los Angeles Angels ===
On August 25, 2022, Zastryzny was claimed off waivers by the Los Angeles Angels. On November 15, Zastryzny was designated for assignment by the Angels after they protected multiple prospects from the Rule 5 draft. On November 18, Zastryzny was non–tendered and became a free agent.

=== Pittsburgh Pirates ===
On December 22, 2022, Zastryzny signed a minor league deal with the Pittsburgh Pirates. He had his contract selected on March 30, 2023. In 18 appearances for Pittsburgh, he posted a 5.29 ERA with 13 strikeouts in 17.0 innings. After a brief stint on the injured list with left forearm inflammation, he was activated and promptly designated for assignment on July 7. Zastryzny cleared waivers and was sent outright to the Triple–A Indianapolis Indians on July 10. On August 24, Zastryzny was selected back to the major league roster. He was designated for assignment again on September 4. On September 8, he cleared waivers and elected free agency in lieu of an outright assignment.

=== Milwaukee Brewers ===
On December 12, 2023, Zastryzny signed a minor league contract with the Milwaukee Brewers. In 28 games for the Triple–A Nashville Sounds, he compiled a 3.18 ERA with 38 strikeouts and 2 saves across 28 1/3 innings pitched. On June 29, 2024, the Brewers selected Zastryzny's contract, adding him to their major league roster. In 9 games for Milwaukee, he compiled a 1.17 ERA with 5 strikeouts over 7 2/3 innings pitched. Zastryzny was placed on the injured list with left elbow tendinitis on July 26, and transferred to the 60–day injured list on September 12.

=== New York Yankees ===
On November 4, 2024, Zastryzny was claimed off waivers by the Chicago Cubs. He was designated for assignment by the Cubs on February 4, 2025. On February 11, Zastryzny cleared waivers and was sent outright to the minors. He subsequently rejected the assignment and elected free agency on February 13.

On February 17, 2025, Zastryzny signed a minor league contract with the New York Yankees. In 13 appearances for the Triple-A Scranton/Wilkes-Barre RailRiders, he recorded a 4.50 ERA with 12 strikeouts over 12 innings pitched.

=== Milwaukee Brewers (second stint) ===
On May 16, 2025, Zastryzny was traded to the Milwaukee Brewers in exchange for cash considerations; he subsequently had his contract selected and was added to Milwaukee's active roster.

Zastryzny began the 2026 season on the injured list due to a left rhomboid strain, after having pitched for the Canada national baseball team in the 2026 World Baseball Classic. He was transferred to the 60-day injured list on April 14, 2026. Zastryzny was activated by Milwaukee on May 31. In 11 appearances for Triple–A Nashville, he recorded a 1.93 ERA with nine strikeouts. Zastryzny was designated for assignment by Milwaukee on September 17; he cleared waivers and was sent outright to Triple–A Nashville two days later. He elected free agency on October 8.

== Personal life ==
Zastryzny married Natalie Sanchez in 2018.
