= Jacob Misiorowski =

American baseball player (born 2002)

- Misiorowski during the 2026 World Series victory parade

Milwaukee Brewers – No. 32
- Pitcher
- Born: April 3, 2002 (age 24); Blue Springs, Missouri, U.S.
- Bats: Right Throws: Right

MLB debut
- June 12, 2025, for the Milwaukee Brewers

MLB statistics (through 2026 season)
- Win–loss record: 21–8
- Earned run average: 2.51
- Strikeouts: 339
- Stats at Baseball Reference

Teams
- Milwaukee Brewers (2025–present)

Career highlights and awards
- 2× All-Star (2025, 2026); World Series champion (2026); NL Cy Young Award (2026); All-MLB First Team (2026); MLB ERA leader (2026); MLB strikeout leader (2026)

Jacob Walter Misiorowski (/mɪzəˈraʊski/ miz-ə-ROW-skee; born April 3, 2002), nicknamed "the Miz", is an American professional baseball pitcher for the Milwaukee Brewers of Major League Baseball (MLB). He made his MLB debut in 2025 and his first MLB All-Star appearance the same year. In 2026, he set the record for the fastest pitch thrown by a starting pitcher since tracking began in 2008. On September 8, 2026, Misiorowski became the first pitcher in MLB history to throw 1,000 pitches 100+ mph in one season, something no team in the speed-tracking era has ever done. He helped the Brewers win their first World Series title the same year, and was unanimously named the winner of the National League's Cy Young Award.

== Early life ==
Jacob Walter Misiorowski was born to Tom and Crystal Misiorowski on April 3, 2002, in Blue Springs, Missouri. He grew up in Grain Valley, Missouri, and attended Grain Valley High School. As a junior in 2018, he posted a 9–2 win-loss record with a 1.48 earned run average (ERA) and was named All-State. Misiorowski participated in a bullpen session that December, where he showcased a quality curveball with scouts from the Milwaukee Brewers, Tampa Bay Rays, and Colorado Rockies in attendance.

Misiorowski's senior season in 2020 was canceled due to COVID-19. His chances of being drafted that year were significantly lowered by MLB's decision to shorten the 2020 draft to five rounds, and Misiorowski's determination to play college baseball after missing that senior year. He initially committed to Oklahoma State but later decided to enroll at Crowder College.

Misiorowski appeared in two games as a freshman at Crowder in 2021 before a torn meniscus ended his season. He committed to transfer to Louisiana State for his final three years of collegiate eligibility during the season. Misiorowski made 15 starts at Crowder during his second season in 2022 and was named a second team NJCAA All-American after going 10–0 with a 2.72 ERA and registering 136 strikeouts in 76 innings pitched. Following the end of the 2022 season, Misiorowski participated in the Major League Baseball Combine and recorded the eight fastest pitches and averaged 99.8 miles per hour on his fastball. These superlative numbers brought widespread attention to Misiorowski and the expectation that he would be selected early in the 2022 MLB draft.

== Professional career ==
=== Draft and minor leagues ===
Although Misiorowski committed to play college baseball at Louisiana State University, the Milwaukee Brewers selected Misiorowski 63rd overall in the 2022 Major League Baseball draft. He signed with the Brewers on July 27, 2022, for an over-slot signing bonus of $2.35 million; the slot value for the 63rd pick that year was $1.1 million. In August 2024, the Brewers promoted Misiorowski to the Triple-A Nashville Sounds and moved him to the bullpen for a potential major league role later in their season. Their stated long-term plan, however, was for him to remain as a starting pitcher.

To begin the 2025 season, Baseball America rated Misiorowski as the Brewers' third-best prospect. The team assigned him to Triple-A Nashville, where he posted a 2.13 ERA with 80 strikeouts in 13 appearances. By June, Baseball America had Misiorowski as the 21st-best prospect in all of baseball.

=== Milwaukee Brewers ===
==== 2025 ====
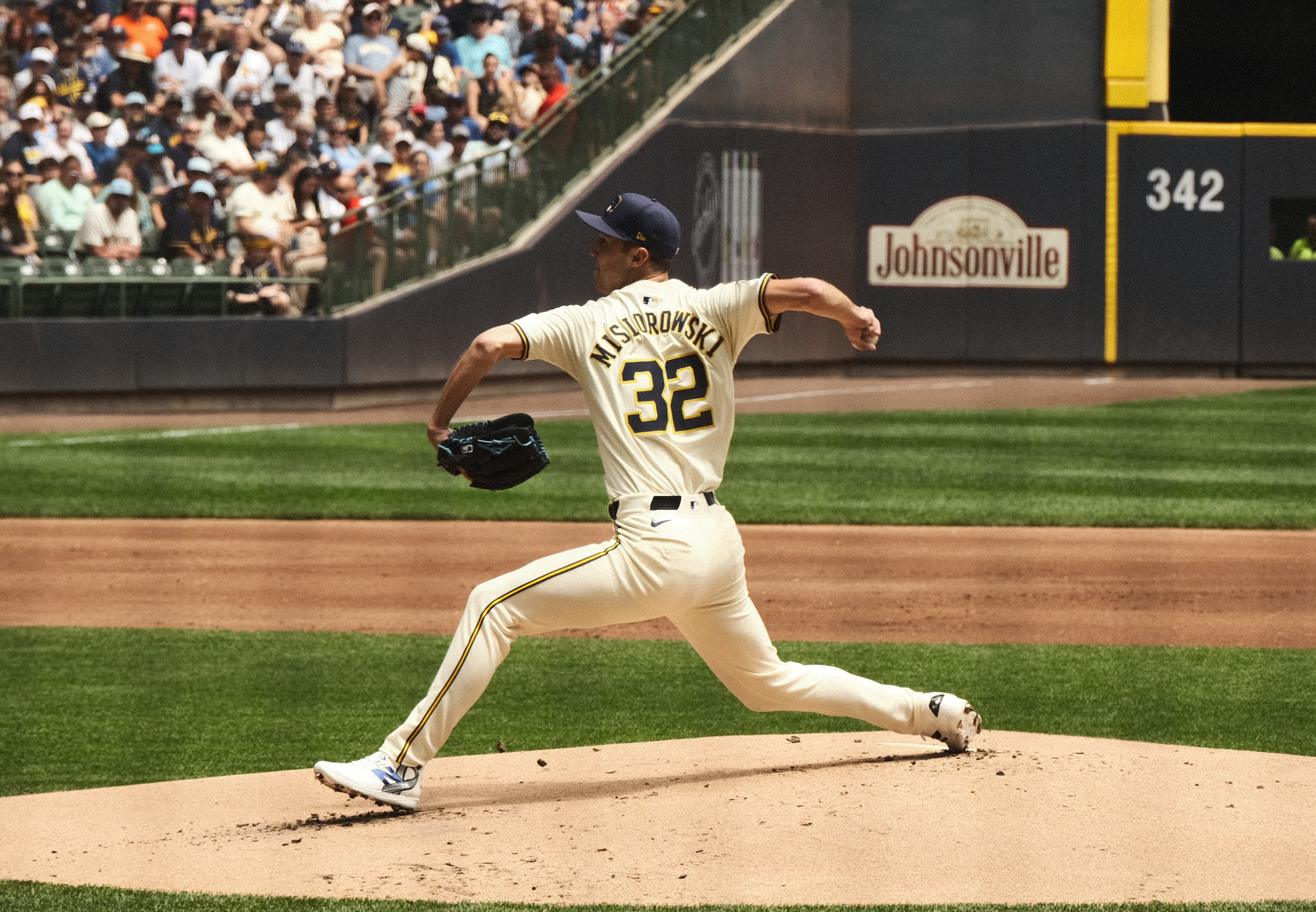
Misiorowski pitching for the Milwaukee Brewers in 2025

On June 12, 2025, Misiorowski was promoted to the Major Leagues for the first time. In his MLB debut, Misiorowski earned a win after throwing five innings of no-hit baseball. His start featured the fastest pitch thrown by a Brewers pitcher in the Statcast era, topping out at 102.3 miles per hour (164.6 km/h). In his second start, against the Minnesota Twins, Misiorowski threw six perfect innings, becoming the first MLB player to record 11 no-hit innings to start his career since 1961. In his third start, against Paul Skenes and the Pittsburgh Pirates, he became the first MLB pitcher since 1901 to allow five hits or fewer across his first three career starts. Misiorowski's fifth start came against Clayton Kershaw and the Los Angeles Dodgers—the National League leader in wins at the time, bolstered by what Milwaukee's local newspaper said was the best lineup in baseball that year. Misiorowski struck out twelve batters in six frames, including a near-immaculate inning, and induced a league-leading twenty-one swings-and-misses.

On July 11, 2025, Misiorowski was named to the National League All-Star roster as a replacement for Matthew Boyd, making him the fastest player in league history to become an All-Star after just five major league games. His selection was controversial due to his lack of experience in the majors. Misiorowski struggled after his All-Star Game appearance, getting scored on in each of his last nine appearances, where he went 1–2 with a 5.89 ERA. Misiorowski finished the regular season with a 5–3 record, a 4.36 ERA, and 87 strikeouts in 66 innings pitched. He also gained some Rookie of the Year votes, finishing 11th in National League Rookie of the Year voting.

Misiorowski was kept on the Brewers' postseason roster and made his postseason debut in game 2 of the National League Division Series against the Chicago Cubs. Misiorowski pitched three shutout innings, with four strikeouts and would get credit for the win in a 7–3 Brewers win. Misiorowski also pitched in relief in the series-deciding Game 5, pitching four innings and surrendering only one run, along with three strikeouts in a 3–1 Brewers win, which Misiorowski also got credit for. Misiorowski would finish the NLDS with a 2–0 record and a 1.29 ERA, along with seven strikeouts in seven innings pitched. Misiorowski appeared in Game 3 of the National League Championship Series against the Dodgers, pitching five innings and surrendering one earned run, while striking out nine batters, but got hit with the loss. Misiorowski finished the postseason with a 2–1 record and a 1.50 ERA, striking out 16 batters in 12 innings pitched.

==== 2026 ====
On March 20, 2026, the Brewers announced that Misiorowski would start on Opening Day (March 26) against the Chicago White Sox. Misiorowski became the youngest Brewers pitcher to start on Opening Day since Ben Sheets in 2002, and the third youngest in franchise history. Misiorowski gave up a lead-off home run to Chase Meidroth to start the game, but shut the White Sox down for the remainder of his start, giving up only two hits and three walks while striking out 11 batters in five innings, the most ever by a Brewers pitcher on Opening Day, while getting the decision in a 14–2 Brewers win.

On May 1, 2026, Misiorowski threw 5 1/3 hitless innings against the Washington Nationals before having to leave the game due to a right hamstring cramp. Misiorowski struck out 8 batters and walked two and got the win decision in a 6–1 Brewers victory. During May 2026, Misiorowski had a scoreless innings streak of 29 1/3 consecutive scoreless innings pitched that ended on May 25, Memorial Day, against the St. Louis Cardinals, giving up a run on an RBI groundout in the sixth inning; his streak was the third-longest in Brewers history. Misiorowski pitched seven innings against the Cardinals, giving up only the single run, while striking out 12 batters, tying a career-high, and became the first MLB pitcher to reach 100 strikeouts for the season. He completed the month of May with a 0.23 earned run average.

On June 6, 2026, Misiorowski threw a 103.7 mph fastball to Kyle Karros in a game against the Colorado Rockies, setting a new record for the fastest pitch delivered by a starting pitcher since tracking began in 2008. On June 12, in his next start, Misiorowski threw a 104.5 mph fastball to Kyle Schwarber of the Philadelphia Phillies, beating his record from a week before for fastest pitch by a starter. In the same game, he completed a Maddux, throwing a one-hit shutout on 95 pitches with 15 strikeouts, the most of any pitcher in accomplishing said feat, beating out Tarik Skubal's 13-strikeout Maddux from May 25, 2025. On June 26, he broke his record yet again by delivering a 105.5 mph fastball to Pete Crow-Armstrong of the Chicago Cubs.

On July 4, he was named to the All-Star Game for the second time in his career. During an August 9 start, Misiorwski notched his 200th strikeout of the season in his 130th inning pitched, becoming the second-fastest pitcher ever to reach the milestone (behind only Spencer Strider of the Atlanta Braves, who reached the mark in his 124th inning in 2023).

In 2026, Misiorowski made 30 starts with a 16–5 record and an MLB-leading 252 strikeouts in 174.2 innings pitched. His 1.80 ERA, 12.985 strikeouts per 9 innings pitched, 4.947 hits per 9 innings pitched, and 0.802 WHIP were also the best among all qualifiers, and on defense, he did not commit an error. Misiorowski became the first Brewers pitcher to register an ERA below 2.00 in 20-plus starts in a season, breaking the franchise record of 2.36 set by Mike Caldwell in 1978, and also set Brewers single-season records in strikeouts per 9 innings pitched, hits per 9 innings pitched, and WHIP.

Leading all of MLB with a 103–59 record, the Brewers won the 1-seed in the National League playoffs and hosted the San Diego Padres in the National League Division Series. Misiorowski started game 1, going only 4 innings, giving up 2 runs, striking out 6 batters, and getting a no-decision in a 3–2 Brewers victory. In the process, he threw the two fastest pitches yet recorded in a postseason game (104.8 mph and 104.6 mph), breaking a record set the previous season by Mason Miller. The Brewers won the NLDS 3–1 and advanced to the National League Championship Series, earning a rematch with the two-time defending world champion Los Angeles Dodgers. Game 1 of the NLCS featured both teams' prized aces, with Misiorowski starting against Tarik Skubal. Misiorowski struggled with having consistent control, pitching only 4 1/3 innings, giving up a run on 5 hits, 3 walks, and 5 strikeouts, and getting another no-decision in a 2-1 Brewers win. The Brewers swept the Dodgers in four games, winning their first-ever National League pennant and clinching their second trip ever to the World Series (having won the American League pennant in 1982).

Misiorowski started game one of the 2026 World Series, becoming the youngest pitcher in MLB history to start three series in a single postseason. His first pitch was recorded at 103.5 mph, setting a new record for the fastest pitch ever thrown by a starting pitcher in a World Series game. Misiorowski struck out three batters, walked one, and gave up one run over five innings, recording a 3-2 Brewers victory that made him the youngest pitcher to win a World Series opening game since 1997. Misiorowski started the fifth game of the series as well, pitching 5 2/3 shutout innings and striking out two batters before leaving the game with a cramp in his right calf. The Brewers went on to beat the Rays 4-1, claiming their first World Series victory in franchise history. Misiorowski went 2-0 with a 0.84 ERA in the Series.

On November 2, Misiorowski was named a finalist for the National League Cy Young Award alongside Chris Sale and Cristopher Sánchez. On November 11, Misiorowski was announced as the winner of the National League Cy Young Award for 2026, winning unaminously. He became the first pitcher to win the award and be the winning pitcher for the clinching game of a World Series in the same season since Randy Johnson in 2001; the first to start and get the winning decision since Orel Hershiser in 1988.

== Personal life ==
Misiorowski is of Polish descent and has expressed interest in representing Poland in the World Baseball Classic. He grew up a fan of the Kansas City Royals.

Misiorowski is an avid Pokémon fan and card collector. For the 2026 All-Star Game, he showcased a custom glove that lets the wearer insert a Pokémon card into a sleeve in the webbing.

He became engaged to his fiancée, Elle, in 2026.

His father was diagnosed with Parkinson's disease in 2014. In 2025, Misiorowski partnered with the Wisconsin Parkinson Association to bring awareness to the disease.

== See also ==
- List of Milwaukee Brewers award winners and All-Stars
- List of World Series starting pitchers

Awards and achievements
Preceded by Drake Baldwin	National League Rookie of the Month; June 2025	Succeeded by Isaac Collins
