= 2025 Major League Baseball postseason =

2025 Major League Baseball playoffs

Tournament details
- Dates: September 30 – November 2, 2025
- Teams: 12

Final positions
- Champions: Los Angeles Dodgers (9th title)
- Runners-up: Toronto Blue Jays

Tournament statistics
- Games played: 47
- Attendance: 2,102,123 (44,726 per game)
- Best BA: Aaron Judge (.500 (Note: Minimum 15 plate appearances or 9 bases on balls in the postseason.))
- Most HRs: Vladimir Guerrero Jr. (TOR) & Shohei Ohtani (LAD) (8)
- Most SBs: Randy Arozarena (SEA) (5)
- Best ERA: Yoshinobu Yamamoto (1.45 (Note: Minimum 15 innings pitched or 3 games started.))
- Most Ks (as pitcher): Blake Snell (LAD) (41)

Awards
- MVP: Yoshinobu Yamamoto (LAD)

The 2025 Major League Baseball postseason was the playoff tournament of Major League Baseball (MLB) for the 2025 season. In each of the two leagues—National and American—the three division winners and three wild card teams (the remaining teams with the best win-loss records) qualified for the postseason, for a total of twelve teams. First was the best-of-three-games Wild Card Series, with the two division winners with the best records in each league getting a bye. Next was the best-of-five-games Division Series. The victors advanced to the best-of-seven-games League Championship Series to determine the pennant winners, the champions of each league. These two teams played against each other in the 2025 World Series, which began on October 24.

In the American League, the Toronto Blue Jays returned for the fourth time in the last six years (2020, 2022–2023, 2025). Joining them were the New York Yankees, who made their eighth appearance in the last nine years (2017–2022, 2024–2025). The Seattle Mariners returned for the second time in the last four years (2022, 2025), and was their first postseason appearance as a division champion since 2001, ending the second-longest division title drought in the majors. Also returning were the Boston Red Sox, who made their first appearance since 2021 and the sixth in the last thirteen years (2013, 2016–2018, 2021, 2025). The Detroit Tigers made their second consecutive postseason appearance (2024–2025), and the Cleveland Guardians returned for the eighth time in the last thirteen years (2013, 2016–2018, 2020, 2022, 2024–2025).

In the National League, the Milwaukee Brewers clinched their seventh postseason berth in the last eight years (2018–2021, 2023–2025). Joining them were the Philadelphia Phillies, who returned for the fourth year in a row (2022–2025). The Chicago Cubs made their first postseason appearance since 2020 and their sixth appearance in the last eleven years (2015–2018, 2020, 2025). Also returning were the Los Angeles Dodgers, who made their thirteenth straight appearance (2013–2025), tying the New York Yankees for the second longest postseason appearance streak in MLB history (the Yankees previously made thirteen straight appearances from 1995 to 2007). Next up were the San Diego Padres, who returned for the fourth time in the last six years (2020, 2022, 2024–2025), and lastly were the Cincinnati Reds, who made their first postseason berth since 2020 (and first in a full season since 2013), marking the first time since then that both teams from Ohio made it to the postseason.

This was the first edition of the postseason since 2016 to not feature the Houston Astros, who previously made eight straight appearances from 2017 to 2024, and the first since 2014 to not feature either team from Texas. This was also the first postseason since 2017 to not feature the Atlanta Braves, who previously made seven straight appearances from 2018 to 2024.

The postseason began on September 30, 2025, and ended on November 2, 2025, with the Los Angeles Dodgers defeating the Toronto Blue Jays in the World Series. The Dodgers repeated as World Series champions and won their ninth championship. They became the eighth franchise in MLB history to win back-to-back titles.

The 2025 postseason was one of the most competitive in recent MLB history, with only two sweeps occurring across the entire bracket. Two Division Series, as well as the ALCS and World Series, all went to winner-take-all elimination games. It was also the first time during the Wild Card Series era (post-2021) that three of the four series went to a decisive Game 3.

== Teams ==
American League Teams National League Teams

The following teams qualified for the postseason:

=== American League ===
1. Toronto Blue Jays – 94–68, AL East champions (8–5 head-to-head vs. NYY)
2. Seattle Mariners – 90–72, AL West champions
3. Cleveland Guardians – 88–74, AL Central champions
4. New York Yankees – 94–68 (5–8 head-to-head vs. TOR)
5. Boston Red Sox – 89–73
6. Detroit Tigers – 87–75

=== National League ===
1. Milwaukee Brewers – 97–65, NL Central champions
2. Philadelphia Phillies – 96–66, NL East champions
3. Los Angeles Dodgers – 93–69, NL West champions
4. Chicago Cubs – 92–70
5. San Diego Padres – 90–72
6. Cincinnati Reds – 83–79

== Playoff bracket ==
Wild Card Series (ALWCS, NLWCS)
4	NY Yankees	2
5	Boston	1
3	Cleveland	1
6	Detroit	2
4	Chicago Cubs	2
5	San Diego	1
3	LA Dodgers	2
6	Cincinnati	0

Division Series (ALDS, NLDS)
1	Toronto	3
4	NY Yankees	1
American League
2	Seattle	3
6	Detroit	2
1	Milwaukee	3
4	Chicago Cubs	2
National League
2	Philadelphia	1
3	LA Dodgers	3

Championship Series (ALCS, NLCS)
1	Toronto	4
2	Seattle	3
1	Milwaukee	0
3	LA Dodgers	4

World Series
AL1	Toronto	3
NL3	LA Dodgers	4

== American League Wild Card Series ==
=== (3) Cleveland Guardians vs. (6) Detroit Tigers ===
Detroit won the series, 2–1.

Game	Date	Score	Location	Time	Attendance
1	September 30	Detroit Tigers – 2, Cleveland Guardians – 1	Progressive Field	2:34	26,186
2	October 1	Detroit Tigers – 1, Cleveland Guardians – 6	Progressive Field	3:12	26,669
3	October 2	Detroit Tigers – 6, Cleveland Guardians – 3	Progressive Field	2:50	29,891

This was the second postseason meeting in the history of the Guardians–Tigers rivalry. They last met in the ALDS the previous year, which the Guardians won in five games. This time, the Tigers returned the favor, defeating the Guardians in three games to advance to the ALDS for the second straight year.

Tarik Skubal pitched 7 2/3 solid innings as the Tigers took Game 1. Game 2 remained tied through seven, then the Guardians put up five unanswered runs in the bottom of the eighth to even the series, capped off by a three-run home run by Bo Naylor. In Game 3, after the Guardians tied the score in the bottom of the fourth, Dillon Dingler hit a solo homer in the top of the sixth to put the Tigers ahead for good, and then the Tigers put up four more insurance runs in the top of the seventh to win 6–3 and advance. This was the Tigers’ first postseason victory over a team from their current division since winning the American League pennant in 1984.

=== (4) New York Yankees vs. (5) Boston Red Sox ===
New York won the series, 2–1.

Game	Date	Score	Location	Time	Attendance
1	September 30	Boston Red Sox – 3, New York Yankees – 1	Yankee Stadium	3:04	47,027
2	October 1	Boston Red Sox – 3, New York Yankees – 4	Yankee Stadium	2:50	47,993
3	October 2	Boston Red Sox – 0, New York Yankees – 4	Yankee Stadium	2:30	48,833

This was the sixth postseason meeting in the history of the Red Sox–Yankees rivalry (1999, 2003, 2004, 2018, 2021). The Red Sox won the previous three meetings (2004, 2018, 2021). The Yankees defeated the Red Sox in three games to advance to the ALDS for the seventh time in nine years, marking their first postseason victory over the Red Sox since 2003.

Garrett Crochet pitched 7 2/3 solid innings as the Red Sox won Game 1. Game 2 remained tied after seven innings, until Austin Wells hit a two-out RBI single to put the Yankees ahead for good as they evened the series. In Game 3, Cam Schlittler pitched eight innings of shutout ball as the Yankees won 4–0 to advance, defeating their archrival in the postseason for the first time in 22 years. The Yankees became the first team to win their wildcard series, in its current three-game format, after losing the first game of the series.

With the win by the Yankees, the playoff history between these two teams is tied at three series wins each.

== National League Wild Card Series ==
=== (3) Los Angeles Dodgers vs. (6) Cincinnati Reds ===
Los Angeles won the series, 2–0.

Game	Date	Score	Location	Time	Attendance
1	September 30	Cincinnati Reds – 5, Los Angeles Dodgers – 10	Dodger Stadium	3:08	50,555
2	October 1	Cincinnati Reds – 4, Los Angeles Dodgers – 8	Dodger Stadium	3:01	50,465

This was the second postseason meeting between the Reds and Dodgers. They last met in the NLDS in 1995, which the Reds won in a sweep. On the 30th anniversary of their previous postseason meeting, the Dodgers returned the favor, sweeping the Reds to advance to the NLDS for the 13th year in a row.

Shohei Ohtani and Teoscar Hernández both hit two home runs each as the Dodgers blew out the Reds in Game 1. The Dodgers became the fifth team to have two players hit multiple home runs in one postseason game. Yoshinobu Yamamoto pitched 6 2/3 solid innings and the Dodger offense once again overwhelmed the Reds in an 8–4 win to complete the sweep. This was the only Wild Card series of the 2025 postseason that was a sweep.

With the series loss, the Reds extended their playoff game losing streak to eight games, dating back to the 2012 NLDS, and the NL Central moved to 0–10 in postseason series since 2019.

=== (4) Chicago Cubs vs. (5) San Diego Padres ===
Chicago won the series, 2–1.

Game	Date	Score	Location	Time	Attendance
1	September 30	San Diego Padres – 1, Chicago Cubs – 3	Wrigley Field	2:25	39,114
2	October 1	San Diego Padres – 3, Chicago Cubs – 0	Wrigley Field	2:54	41,083
3	October 2	San Diego Padres – 1, Chicago Cubs – 3	Wrigley Field	3:00	40,895

This was the second postseason meeting between the Cubs and Padres. They last met in the NLCS in 1984, which the Padres won in five games before falling in the World Series. This time, the Cubs returned the favor, defeating the Padres in three games to advance to the NLDS for the first time since 2017.

In Game 1, the Cubs won 3–1 while using six different pitchers throughout the game. In Game 2, a two-run homer by Manny Machado in the top of the fifth helped secure a shutout victory for the Padres as they evened the series. However, history would not repeat itself, as Cubs reliever Andrew Kittredge stopped a rally by the Padres in the top of the ninth to secure the series win for the Cubs. This was the first playoff series win by the Cubs since 2017.

The Cubs’ victory ended a streak of ten straight postseason series losses for the NL Central dating back to the 2019 NLCS.

== American League Division Series ==
=== (1) Toronto Blue Jays vs. (4) New York Yankees ===
Toronto won the series, 3–1.

Game	Date	Score	Location	Time	Attendance
1	October 4	New York Yankees – 1, Toronto Blue Jays – 10	Rogers Centre	3:06	44,655
2	October 5	New York Yankees – 7, Toronto Blue Jays – 13	Rogers Centre	3:04	44,764
3	October 7	Toronto Blue Jays – 6, New York Yankees – 9	Yankee Stadium	3:29	47,399
4	October 8	Toronto Blue Jays – 5, New York Yankees – 2	Yankee Stadium	3:22	47,823

The Yankees and Blue Jays finished the 2025 season with identical regular-season records of 94–68, with Toronto winning the tiebreaker due to winning eight out of 13 regular-season games between the two teams. The Blue Jays handily defeated the defending American League champion Yankees in four games to advance to the ALCS for the first time since 2016.

The series started disastrously for the Yankees, as the Blue Jays' offense overwhelmed the Yankees’ pitching staff in back-to-back blowout wins in Games 1 and 2 to take a 2–0 series lead headed to the Bronx, with the most notable moment being Vladimir Guerrero Jr. hitting the first postseason grand slam for the Blue Jays in Game 2. The Yankees overcame a 6–1 Blue Jays lead by scoring eight unanswered runs to take Game 3, in part thanks to a three-run homer by Aaron Judge in the bottom of the fourth and a solo homer in the bottom of the fifth from Jazz Chisholm Jr.. However, that was all the Yankees could manage as the Blue Jays took Game 4 by three runs despite using eight different pitchers. This was the first postseason series win by the Blue Jays since 2016.

=== (2) Seattle Mariners vs. (6) Detroit Tigers ===
Seattle won the series, 3–2.

Game	Date	Score	Location	Time	Attendance
1	October 4	Detroit Tigers – 3, Seattle Mariners – 2 (11)	T-Mobile Park	3:21	47,290
2	October 5	Detroit Tigers – 2, Seattle Mariners – 3	T-Mobile Park	2:46	47,371
3	October 7	Seattle Mariners – 8, Detroit Tigers – 4	Comerica Park	2:57 (2:53 delay)	41,525
4	October 8	Seattle Mariners – 3, Detroit Tigers – 9	Comerica Park	2:55	37,069
5	October 10	Detroit Tigers – 2, Seattle Mariners – 3 (15)	T-Mobile Park	4:58	47,025

In one of the closest and most grueling playoff series in postseason history, the Mariners narrowly defeated the Tigers in five games to return to the ALCS for the first time since 2001.

Game 1 was the first of two extra-inning contests. A two-run homer by Kerry Carpenter gave the Tigers the lead in the top of the fifth inning, then Julio Rodríguez tied the game in the bottom of the sixth with an RBI single, which ended up forcing extras. In the top of the eleventh, Zach McKinstry's RBI single put the Tigers in the lead for good, and Keider Montero shut down the Mariners in the bottom of the inning. In Game 2, Jorge Polanco hit two solo home runs off Tarik Skubal, but Spencer Torkelson hit a two-run RBI double in the top of the eighth to tie the game. Rodríguez put the Mariners back in the lead in the bottom of the eighth with an RBI single to even the series headed to Detroit. Seattle won their first LDS game since 2001. In Game 3, Eugenio Suárez, J. P. Crawford, and Cal Raleigh all homered for the Mariners as they won by four runs to take the series lead. In Game 4, Riley Greene, Javier Báez, and Gleyber Torres all homered for the Tigers as they blew out the Mariners to force a decisive fifth game back in Seattle.

Game 5 was the most memorable contest of the series. After Carpenter gave the Tigers the lead with yet another two-run homer in the top of the sixth, Leo Rivas tied the game in the bottom of the seventh with an RBI single, forcing extras. After seven scoreless innings, the Tigers’ pitching staff ultimately ran out of gas as the Mariners prevailed in the bottom of the fifteenth with Polanco's bases-loaded walk-off single. Game 5 was the longest winner-take-all postseason game in MLB history, in both innings and elapsed time.

== National League Division Series ==
=== (1) Milwaukee Brewers vs. (4) Chicago Cubs ===
Milwaukee won the series, 3–2.

Game	Date	Score	Location	Time	Attendance
1	October 4	Chicago Cubs – 3, Milwaukee Brewers – 9	American Family Field	3:05	42,678
2	October 6	Chicago Cubs – 3, Milwaukee Brewers – 7	American Family Field	2:57	42,787
3	October 8	Milwaukee Brewers – 3, Chicago Cubs – 4	Wrigley Field	3:13	40,737
4	October 9	Milwaukee Brewers – 0, Chicago Cubs – 6	Wrigley Field	3:03	41,770
5	October 11	Chicago Cubs – 1, Milwaukee Brewers – 3	American Family Field	2:36	42,743

This was the first postseason meeting in the history of the Brewers–Cubs rivalry, also known as the I-94 Rivalry. The Brewers defeated the Cubs in five games to return to the NLCS for the first time since 2018.

In Game 1, the Brewers put on an offensive showing with nine runs in the first two innings in a blowout win. In Game 2, the Cubs jumped out to a 3–0 lead in the top of the first, but after a game-tying three-run home run by Andrew Vaughn in the bottom of the first, the Brewers put up four more unanswered runs to take a 2–0 series lead headed to Chicago. There, the Cubs responded. After Michael Busch’s game-tying homer in the bottom of the first, the Cubs put up three more runs and their bullpen stopped a late Brewers rally to win Game 3. In Game 4, a three-run homer by Ian Happ gave the Cubs a lead they wouldn't relinquish as they shut out the Brewers to force a decisive fifth game back in Milwaukee. In Game 5, after Seiya Suzuki tied the game for the Cubs with a solo homer, Vaughn hit his second homer of the series in the bottom of the fourth to put the Brewers in the lead for good, securing their spot in the NLCS.

=== (2) Philadelphia Phillies vs. (3) Los Angeles Dodgers ===
Los Angeles won the series, 3–1.

Game	Date	Score	Location	Time	Attendance
1	October 4	Los Angeles Dodgers – 5, Philadelphia Phillies – 3	Citizens Bank Park	3:00	45,777
2	October 6	Los Angeles Dodgers – 4, Philadelphia Phillies – 3	Citizens Bank Park	3:07	45,653
3	October 8	Philadelphia Phillies – 8, Los Angeles Dodgers – 2	Dodger Stadium	2:54	53,689
4	October 9	Philadelphia Phillies – 1, Los Angeles Dodgers – 2 (11)	Dodger Stadium	3:30	50,563

This was the sixth postseason meeting between the Phillies and Dodgers (1977, 1978, 1983, 2008, 2009), and their first meeting outside of the NLCS. The Phillies won the most recent three meetings (1983, 2008, 2009). The Dodgers defeated the Phillies in four games to reach the NLCS for the tenth time in seventeen years.

In Game 1, the Phillies led 3–2 after six innings, then a three-run homer from Teoscar Hernández in the top of the seventh put the Dodgers in the lead for good, stealing a road win. Game 2 was a pitchers' duel between Blake Snell and Jesús Luzardo, won by the former as the Dodgers took a 2–0 series lead headed to Los Angeles. In Game 3, the Phillies blew out the Dodgers to get on the board in the series. Game 4 was another pitchers' duel, which extended into extras, and after the Dodgers loaded the bases with two outs, pinch runner Hyeseong Kim scored on a walk-off error by Philadelphia's Orion Kerkering in the bottom of the eleventh to seal the series win.

This series was a repeat of the 1978 NLCS between both teams: just like in that series, the Dodgers stole the first two games on the road in Philadelphia, then the Phillies took Game 3 in a rout, and then the Dodgers won Game 4 in extra innings. With the win by the Dodgers, the playoff history between these two teams is tied at three series wins each.

== American League Championship Series ==
=== (1) Toronto Blue Jays vs. (2) Seattle Mariners ===
Toronto won the series, 4–3.

Game	Date	Score	Location	Time	Attendance
1	October 12	Seattle Mariners – 3, Toronto Blue Jays – 1	Rogers Centre	2:48	44,474
2	October 13	Seattle Mariners – 10, Toronto Blue Jays – 3	Rogers Centre	3:28	44,814
3	October 15	Toronto Blue Jays – 13, Seattle Mariners – 4	T-Mobile Park	2:49	46,471
4	October 16	Toronto Blue Jays – 8, Seattle Mariners – 2	T-Mobile Park	2:54	46,981
5	October 17	Toronto Blue Jays – 2, Seattle Mariners – 6	T-Mobile Park	3:00	46,758
6	October 19	Seattle Mariners – 2, Toronto Blue Jays – 6	Rogers Centre	2:51	44,764
7	October 20	Seattle Mariners – 3, Toronto Blue Jays – 4	Rogers Centre	2:50	44,770

This was the second postseason meeting between the Blue Jays and Mariners, the two AL expansion teams of 1977. They first met in the Wild Card series in 2022, which the Mariners won in a sweep in Toronto. The Blue Jays overcame a two-games-to-none series deficit to defeat the Mariners in seven games, returning to the World Series for the first time since 1993.

The Mariners continued their postseason winning streak at Rogers Centre to start the series. After a George Springer leadoff home run, the Mariners responded with three unanswered runs, which consisted of a home run by Cal Raleigh and two Jorge Polanco RBI singles for a 3–1 win in Game 1. The next day, Julio Rodríguez, Polanco, and Naylor all hit multi-run home runs as the offense overcame Logan Gilbert's three-inning, three-run start as the Mariners blew out the Blue Jays to take a 2–0 series lead headed to Seattle. Things then took a turn for the worse for the Mariners, as the Blue Jays’ offense overwhelmed the Mariners pitching staff in back-to-back blowout wins to even the series at two. In Game 5, the Blue Jays took a 2–1 lead in the top of the sixth and were six outs away from taking the series lead, but then the Mariners put up five unanswered runs in the bottom of the eighth, capped off by a grand slam from Eugenio Suárez, to take a 3–2 series lead headed back to Toronto. In Game 6, home runs from Vladimir Guerrero Jr. and Addison Barger would help secure a 6-2 Blue Jays win as they forced a seventh game. In Seattle's first-ever Game 7, the Mariners led 3–1 in the bottom of the seventh and were eight outs away from winning their first AL pennant, but then Springer hit a three-run home run to put the Blue Jays in the lead for good, securing their first pennant in 32 years. This was the first Game 7 ever won by the Blue Jays in franchise history, and they became the first team to win a league pennant after losing the first two games at home.

Along with the Edmonton Oilers winning the NHL Western Conference title, 2025 marked the first year since 1993 in which multiple Canadian teams were playing for a championship in the four major leagues, as the Blue Jays and the Montreal Canadiens previously won both the World Series and Stanley Cup respectively that year.

With the loss, the Mariners fell to 0–4 in the ALCS, having previously lost in 1995, 2000, and 2001.

== National League Championship Series ==
=== (1) Milwaukee Brewers vs. (3) Los Angeles Dodgers ===
Los Angeles won the series, 4–0.

Game	Date	Score	Location	Time	Attendance
1	October 13	Los Angeles Dodgers – 2, Milwaukee Brewers – 1	American Family Field	2:53	41,737
2	October 14	Los Angeles Dodgers – 5, Milwaukee Brewers – 1	American Family Field	2:51	41,427
3	October 16	Milwaukee Brewers – 1, Los Angeles Dodgers – 3	Dodger Stadium	2:48	51,251
4	October 17	Milwaukee Brewers – 1, Los Angeles Dodgers – 5	Dodger Stadium	2:41	52,883

This was the third postseason meeting between the Dodgers and Brewers (2018, 2020), and a rematch of the 2018 NLCS, which the Dodgers won in seven games before falling in the World Series. The Dodgers swept the overall top seed Brewers to return to the World Series for the second year in a row and fifth time in nine years.

Blake Snell pitched eight innings of shutout ball and struck out ten batters as the Dodgers took Game 1. Game 1 was also notable for the Brewers pulling off the first 8-6-2 double play in postseason history despite the loss. In Game 2, Yoshinobu Yamamoto pitched a complete game as the Dodgers took a 2–0 series lead headed to Los Angeles. It was the first complete game in the postseason for the Dodgers since José Lima did it in the third game of the NLDS in 2004 and the first postseason complete game overall since Justin Verlander in Game 2 of the ALCS in 2017. Yamamoto was also the first Japanese pitcher to throw a complete game in the MLB postseason. Game 3 remained tied until the sixth inning, when Tommy Edman put the Dodgers back in the lead for good with an RBI single, and then Freddie Freeman added an insurance run off a throwing error by Abner Uribe as the Dodgers took a commanding three games to none series lead. In Game 4, Shohei Ohtani carried the Dodgers to the pennant with three home runs, and pitching six shutout innings with ten strikeouts, completing the sweep.

With the win, the Dodgers improved their postseason record against the Brewers to 3–0, and it marked the first time since the 1970s that the Dodgers won at least three NL pennants in a single decade (1974, 1977, 1978).

Both teams met in the NLCS once again the next year, where the Brewers returned the favor and swept the Dodgers en route to a World Series title.

== 2025 World Series ==
=== (AL1) Toronto Blue Jays vs. (NL3) Los Angeles Dodgers ===
Los Angeles won the series, 4–3.

Game	Date	Score	Location	Time	Attendance
1	October 24	Los Angeles Dodgers – 4, Toronto Blue Jays – 11	Rogers Centre	3:13	44,353
2	October 25	Los Angeles Dodgers – 5, Toronto Blue Jays – 1	Rogers Centre	2:36	44,607
3	October 27	Toronto Blue Jays – 5, Los Angeles Dodgers – 6 (18)	Dodger Stadium	6:39	52,654
4	October 28	Toronto Blue Jays – 6, Los Angeles Dodgers – 2	Dodger Stadium	2:54	52,552
5	October 29	Toronto Blue Jays – 6, Los Angeles Dodgers – 1	Dodger Stadium	3:02	52,175
6	October 31	Los Angeles Dodgers – 3, Toronto Blue Jays – 1	Rogers Centre	3:02	44,710
7	November 1	Los Angeles Dodgers – 5, Toronto Blue Jays – 4 (11)	Rogers Centre	4:07	44,713

This World Series marked the first meeting between teams from Toronto and Los Angeles in a postseason series since the 1993 Stanley Cup playoffs. In one of the closest and most grueling World Series ever played, the Dodgers narrowly defeated the Blue Jays in seven games to repeat as World Series champions, winning their ninth championship in franchise history.

In the first World Series game in Toronto in 32 years, the Blue Jays' offense chased Blake Snell from the mound in a Game 1 blowout win. Game 1 was also notable for Addison Barger’s pinch-hit grand slam in the bottom of the sixth, which was the first in World Series history. In Game 2, Yoshinobu Yamamoto pitched his second complete game of the postseason as the Dodgers prevailed by four runs to even the series headed to Los Angeles. Yamamoto became the first pitcher to throw multiple complete games in the same postseason since Madison Bumgarner in 2014, the first to do it in back-to-back games since Curt Schilling in 2001, and the first to throw a complete game in the World Series since Johnny Cueto in 2015.

Game 3 was the most notable contest of the series. It was a long extra-innings grind which went eighteen innings, tying with Game 4 of the 2005 NLDS (Atlanta vs. Houston), Game 2 of the 2014 NLDS (Washington vs. San Francisco), Game 3 of the 2018 World Series (which also featured the Dodgers), and Game 3 of the 2022 ALDS (Houston vs. Seattle) as the longest postseason games in MLB history in terms of innings. After Shohei Ohtani forced extras with his second home run of the game in the bottom of the seventh, the game remained scoreless through the next ten and a half innings until the Dodgers prevailed off a Freddie Freeman walk-off solo homer in the bottom of the eighteenth. With his walk-off home run, Freeman was the first player to accomplish this feat in consecutive World Series, after his grand-slam walk-off in Game 1 of the 2024 World Series. Game 3 would ultimately be Clayton Kershaw’s final postseason game.

In Game 4, the Dodgers jumped out to an early lead, but it was quickly erased by a two-run homer by Vladimir Guerrero Jr. in the top of the second, which put the Blue Jays in the lead for good as they evened the series at two. In Game 5, Trey Yesavage pitched seven solid innings, and the Blue Jays' offense once again gave Snell trouble as they won 6–1 to take a 3–2 series lead headed back to Toronto. In Game 6, Yamamoto pitched six innings, allowing five hits and one run, and Mookie Betts got out of his postseason dry spell with a two-run RBI single in the top of the third as the Dodgers won to force a decisive seventh game. In Toronto's first ever World Series Game 7, the Blue Jays led 4–3 in the top of the ninth and were two outs away from their third title, but then Miguel Rojas hit a solo homer to tie the game, forcing the first extra inning Game 7 since 2016. After a scoreless ninth and tenth, a solo homer from Will Smith in the top of the eleventh put the Dodgers in the lead for good, and then Yamamoto earned his third win of the series in the bottom of the inning. This was the fifth consecutive World Series Game 7 to be won by the road team.

Yamamoto won World Series MVP, becoming the first Japanese-born player to accomplish such a feat since Hideki Matsui in 2009. With the win, the Dodgers tied the Boston Red Sox and the Athletics for the third most World Series championships. The Dodgers became the first team to win back-to-back titles since the New York Yankees did so in 1999 and 2000 (as part of a World Series three-peat from 1998 to 2000), and they became the first National League team to repeat as World Series champions overall since the Cincinnati Reds did so in 1975 and 1976. The Dodgers also became the first team to win the World Series after sweeping the LCS, but with their opponent winning the pennant in a winner-take-all game since the Detroit Tigers did so in 1984, and were the first to do it since the LCS moved to a seven-game series in 1985.

This was Toronto's first defeat in the World Series. Previously, they had won in their first two appearances in 1992 and 1993. This marked the first time a Toronto-based team lost in a championship round of the four major North American leagues since the 1960 Stanley Cup Final.

== Broadcasting ==
=== Television coverage ===
==== United States ====
Coverage of the four Wild Card Series were produced by ESPN, with ABC aired two National League games and one American League game, and ESPN aired the remaining games (five American League games and three National League games).

TNT Sports (TBS and TruTV) aired the National League Division Series and National League Championship Series.

Fox Sports (Fox, FS1, or FS2) aired the American League Division Series and the American League Championship Series. Due to a rain delay, Game 3 of the Tigers/Mariners series aired instead on MLB Network and FS2. The World Series will be broadcast exclusively on Fox for the 26th consecutive year.

Spanish language broadcasts was available on ESPN Deportes for ESPN's games, Fox Deportes for Fox Sports' games, and UniMás for TNT Sports' games. Along with Fox Deportes, Univision also aired Game 1 of the World Series.

==== Canada ====
Sportsnet broadcast all Toronto Blue Jays games, and simulcast the U.S. feeds of all the other postseason series in English, with TVA Sports covering the AL postseason and World Series, and rival RDS covering the NL postseason games in French.

==== Japan ====
NHK broadcast all Los Angeles Dodgers games, and some other games including all World Series games (regardless participation of the Dodgers) through its NHK BS, NHK General TV, and/or NHK BSP4K channels. J Sports also broadcast some postseason games.

=== Streaming ===
==== United States ====
All ESPN-produced games (including games on ABC) were available on the ESPN app. All of TNT Sports' games then will be available on HBO Max, and all of Fox Sports' games will be available on Fox One. Additionally, ESPN/ABC, TNT Sports', and Fox Sports' games were streamed on their respective apps.

==== Canada ====
All games were available on Sportsnet+.

=== Radio ===
ESPN Radio aired the entire MLB postseason. Spanish language broadcasts were available on Univision Radio.

=== Most watched playoff games ===
All times Eastern. Note that this only includes viewership numbers on networks within the United States.

Rank	Round	Date	Game	Matchup			TV network(s)	Streaming	Viewers (millions)
1	World Series	Tuesday, October 28, 8:00 p.m.	Game 4	Los Angeles Dodgers	2–6	Toronto Blue Jays	Fox	Fox One	14.520
2	World Series	Wednesday, October 29, 8:00 p.m.	Game 5	Toronto Blue Jays	6-1	Los Angeles Dodgers	Fox	Fox One	14.292
3	World Series	Friday, October 24, 8:00 p.m.	Game 1	Los Angeles Dodgers	4–11	Toronto Blue Jays	Fox	Fox One	12.499
4	World Series	Saturday, October 25, 8:00 p.m.	Game 2	Los Angeles Dodgers	5-1	Toronto Blue Jays	Fox	Fox One	11.399
5	World Series	Monday, October 27, 8:00 p.m.	Game 3	Toronto Blue Jays	5–6 (18)	Los Angeles Dodgers	Fox	Fox One	11.157
6	ALDS	Friday, October 10, 8:08 p.m.	Game 5	Detroit Tigers	2–3 (15)	Seattle Mariners	Fox	Fox One	8.591
7	ALWC	Thursday, October 2, 8:08 p.m.	Game 3	Boston Red Sox	0–4	New York Yankees	ESPN	ESPN Unlimited	7.440
8	ALWC	Wednesday, October 1, 6:08 p.m.	Game 2	Boston Red Sox	3–4	New York Yankees	ESPN	ESPN Unlimited	6.759
9	ALWC	Tuesday, September 30, 6:08 p.m.	Game 1	Boston Red Sox	3–1	New York Yankees	ESPN	ESPN Unlimited	6.518
10	NLCS	Tuesday, October 14, 8:08 p.m.	Game 2	Los Angeles Dodgers	5–1	Milwaukee Brewers	TBS, TruTV	HBO Max	6.051

In Canada, Game 7 of the ALCS attracted an average of 6 million viewers on Sportsnet, CityTV and Sportsnet+. Sportsnet reported an average of 7.5 million viewers across the World Series. The Game 7 telecast was one of the most-watched television broadcasts in Canadian history, with an average of 11.6 million viewers across Sportsnet and TVA Sports, a peak average viewership of 14 million on Sportsnet during the bottom of the ninth inning, and an estimated 18.5 million watching all or part of the game (representing approximately 45% of the country's population). In Japan, Game 6 of the World Series was seen by an average of 13.1 million viewers on NHK General TV, and Game 7 was seen by an average of 12 million viewers on NHK BS.
