= 2025 National League Wild Card Series =

Teams
Team (Wins)		Manager	Season
Los Angeles Dodgers (2)		Dave Roberts	93–69 (.574), GA: 3
Cincinnati Reds (0)		Terry Francona	83–79 (.512), GB: 14
- Dates: September 30 – October 1
- Television: ESPN
- TV announcers: Jon Sciambi, Doug Glanville, and Alden Gonzalez
- Radio: ESPN
- Radio announcers: Tom Hart and Tim Kurkjian
- Umpires: Ryan Additon, Lance Barrett, Tripp Gibson, Nick Mahrley, Alfonso Márquez (crew chief), Quinn Wolcott

Teams
Team (Wins)		Manager	Season
Chicago Cubs (2)		Craig Counsell	92–70 (.568), GB: 5
San Diego Padres (1)		Mike Shildt	90–72 (.556), GB: 3
- Dates: September 30 – October 2
- Television: ABC (Games 1 & 2); ESPN (Game 3)
- TV announcers: Kevin Brown, Jessica Mendoza, Ben McDonald, and Jesse Rogers
- Radio: ESPN
- Radio announcers: Mike Couzens and Chris Burke
- Umpires: Erich Bacchus, Cory Blaser, Ben May, Mike Muchlinski, D. J. Reyburn, Todd Tichenor (crew chief)

The 2025 National League Wild Card Series were the two best-of-three playoff series in Major League Baseball’s (MLB) 2025 postseason to determine the participating teams of the 2025 National League Division Series (NLDS). Both Wild Card Series began on September 30, with Game 2s scheduled for October 1. ESPN and ABC each broadcast one series in the United States (Except for ESPN airing game 3 of the Cubs vs Padres series instead of ABC), with ESPN Radio also airing both series.

These matchups were:

- (3) Los Angeles Dodgers (NL West champions) vs. (6) Cincinnati Reds (third wild card): Dodgers won the series, 2–0.
- (4) Chicago Cubs (first wild card) vs. (5) San Diego Padres (second wild card): Cubs won the series, 2–1.

== Background ==
The lowest-seeded division winner and three wild-card teams in each league play in a best-of-three series after the end of the regular season. The winners of each league's wild card rounds advance to face the two best division winners in that league's Division Series. This was the first National League postseason to not feature the Atlanta Braves since 2017, ending the current third longest consecutive postseason streak in MLB.

The Cincinnati Reds and New York Mets entered the last day of the season tied for the sixth seed at 83–78. Due to the 4–2 record versus the Mets this season, the Reds would qualify for the postseason if both teams finished tied. This was the second straight season the Mets are playing to get into the postseason on the last day of the season. Coincidentally, the last time the Reds were in this situation was in 1999 when they were tied with the Mets and had to play a tie-breaker game to reach the postseason. Ultimately, the Mets and Reds both lost on the last day of the season, giving the Reds the sixth seed. The Mets went 38–55 after a 45–24 start to the season.

The Los Angeles Dodgers (93–69) clinched their league-leading thirteenth consecutive postseason appearance on September 19 and won the National League West on September 25 via a road victory against the Arizona Diamondbacks. Due to them having the worst record among the three NL division winners, they were locked into the third seed. This was the first time the Dodgers were in the Wild Card Series/Game since 2021 but the first as the division winner. They played host to the Cincinnati Reds (83–79), who clinched a postseason appearance on the last day of the season with a New York Mets loss to the Miami Marlins. This was the first playoff appearance for Cincinnati since 2020 and first in a full season since 2013. The Dodgers won the season series against the Reds, 5–1. Cincinnati and Los Angeles had a fierce rivalry from their days in the NL West together from 1969 to 1993, including eleven 1–2 finishes in the standings, with seven of them being within 5 1/2 games or fewer. Cincinnati won the only postseason match-up between the two teams, sweeping Los Angeles in the 1995 NLDS (this was also their last postseason series victory, as they have the current longest postseason series win drought in MLB).

The Chicago Cubs (92–70) clinched their first postseason berth since 2020 on September 17 and were locked into the Wild Card four days after a loss to the Cincinnati Reds, which ended their National League Central title aspirations. They played the San Diego Padres (90–72), who clinched a postseason berth for the second consecutive season and the fourth time in the last six years (2020, 2022, 2024–2025) with a 5–4 walk-off victory against the Milwaukee Brewers on September 22 and then clinch home-field advantage against them. The Cubs and Padres split their regular season series, 3–3. This was the first postseason meeting between the two teams since the 1984 NLCS, which the Padres dramatically won in five games after being down 2–0.

As top two seeds, the Milwaukee Brewers (97–65) and Philadelphia Phillies (96–66) earned a first-round bye and will have home-field advantage in the NLDS.

== Matchups ==
=== Los Angeles Dodgers vs. Cincinnati Reds ===
Los Angeles won the series, 2–0.

Game	Date	Score	Location	Time	Attendance
1	September 30	Cincinnati Reds – 5, Los Angeles Dodgers – 10	Dodger Stadium	3:08	50,555
2	October 1	Cincinnati Reds – 4, Los Angeles Dodgers – 8	Dodger Stadium	3:01	50,465

=== Chicago Cubs vs. San Diego Padres ===
Chicago won the series, 2–1.

Game	Date	Score	Location	Time	Attendance
1	September 30	San Diego Padres – 1, Chicago Cubs – 3	Wrigley Field	2:25	39,114
2	October 1	San Diego Padres – 3, Chicago Cubs – 0	Wrigley Field	2:54	41,083
3	October 2	San Diego Padres – 1, Chicago Cubs – 3	Wrigley Field	3:00	40,895

== Los Angeles vs. Cincinnati ==
From 1969 to 1993, the Dodgers and Reds shared the National League West and dominated it together, combining to win 14 division titles, 10 NL pennants, and five World Series from 1970 to 1990. The rivalry died when the Reds moved to the National League Central in 1994.

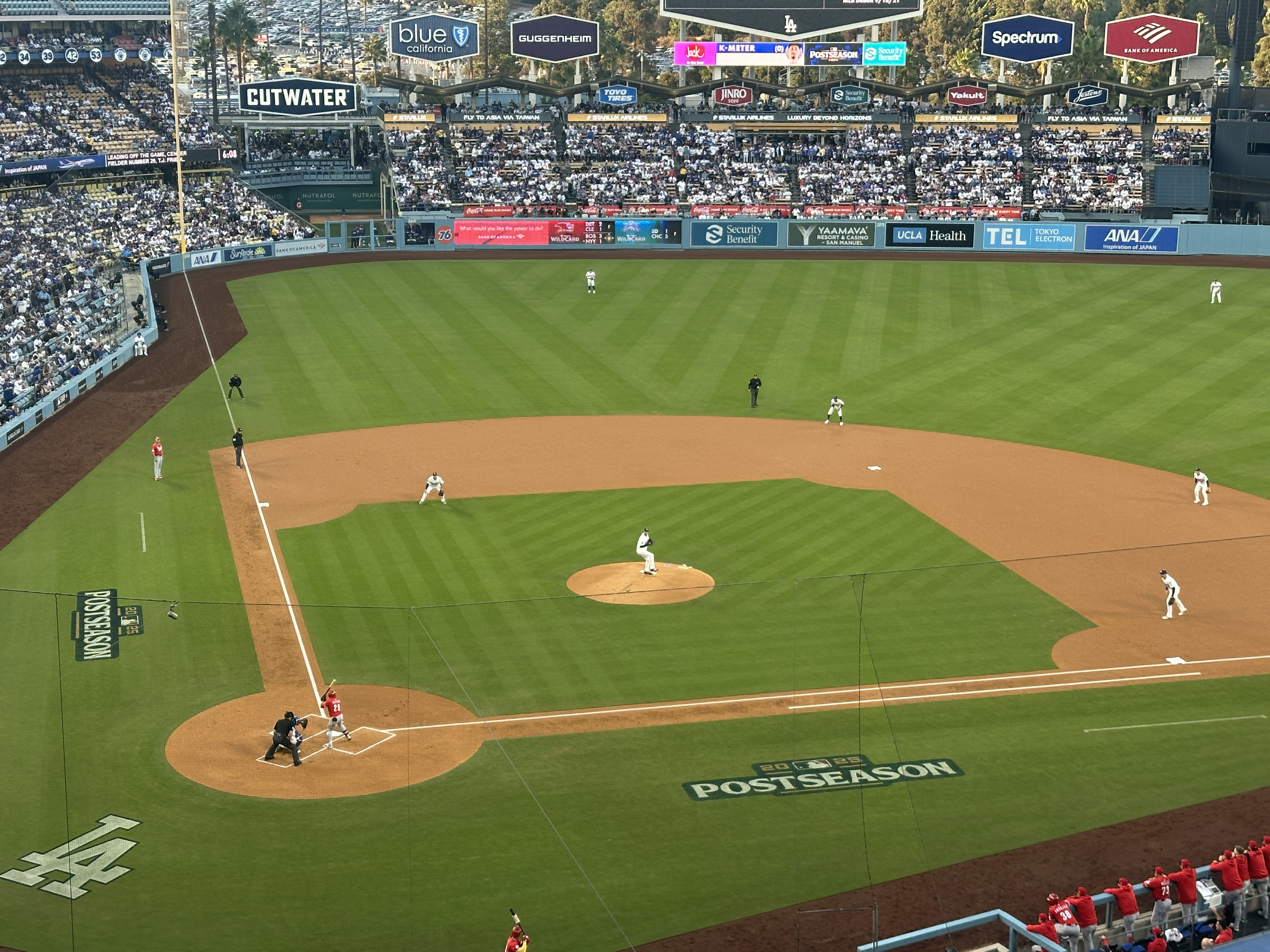
Blake Snell throws the first pitch for the Dodgers in the opening game of the Wild Card Series

This was the second postseason meeting between the Cincinnati Reds and the Los Angeles Dodgers. Their only other postseason meeting occurred in the 1995 National League Division Series, in which the Reds swept the Dodgers in three games. That 1995 series is also Cincinnati's most recent playoff series win, as their 30-year drought the longest in the majors.

=== Game 1 ===
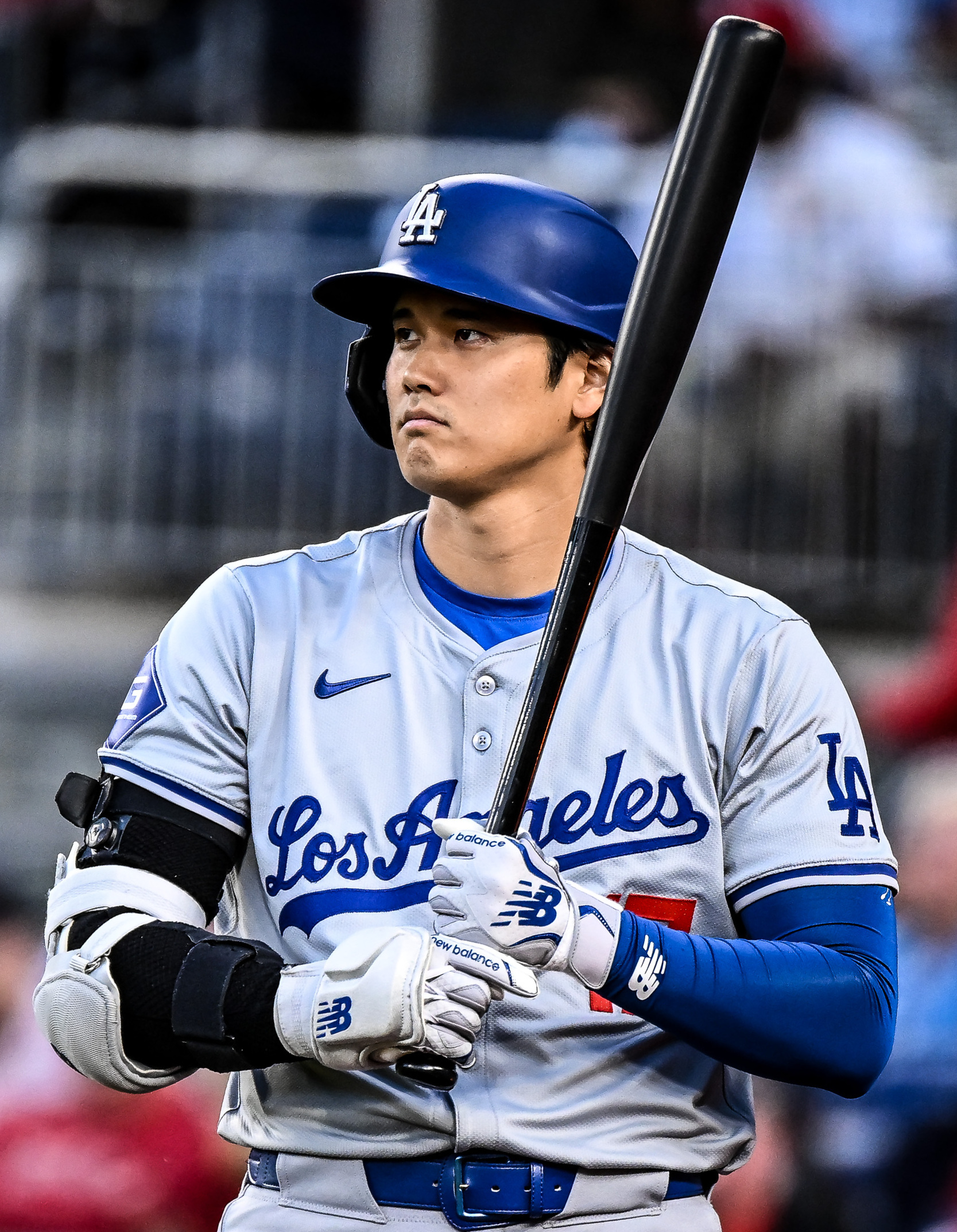
Shohei Ohtani hit two home runs in Game 1.

September 30, 2025 6:08 pm (PDT) at Dodger Stadium in Los Angeles, California 71 °F (22 °C), Clear
Team	1	2	3	4	5	6	7	8	9	R	H	E
Cincinnati	0	0	0	0	0	0	2	3	0	5	6	1
Los Angeles	1	0	4	0	1	2	2	0	X	10	15	0
WP: Blake Snell (1–0) LP: Hunter Greene (0–1); Home runs: CIN: None; LAD: Shohei Ohtani 2 (2), Teoscar Hernández 2 (2), Tommy Edman (1); Attendance: 50,555; Boxscore

In the bottom of the first inning, Shohei Ohtani hit a leadoff, solo home run to give the Dodgers a 1–0 lead. Back-to-back home runs from Teoscar Hernández and Tommy Edman in the bottom of the third extended the Dodgers' lead to 5–0. In the bottom of the fifth inning, Hernández hit his second homer of the game, extending the Dodgers' lead to 6–0. In the bottom of the sixth inning, Ohtani hit his second home run of the game, extending the Dodgers' lead to 8–0. In the top of the seventh inning, Elly De La Cruz and Tyler Stephenson hit RBI singles to get the Reds on the board. In the bottom of the seventh inning, Alex Call and Ben Rortvedt hit RBI singles to extend the Dodgers' lead to 10–2. The Reds scored three more runs in the top of the eighth inning as Sal Stewart with an RBI walk, Spencer Steer with an RBI single, and De La Cruz drew a walk to drive in a forced run for Miguel Andujar, cutting the Reds' deficit to 10–5. Blake Treinen gets the final out of the game as Andujar grounds out.

The Dodgers became the fifth team in postseason history with two players with a multi-HR game in the same postseason game.

=== Game 2 ===
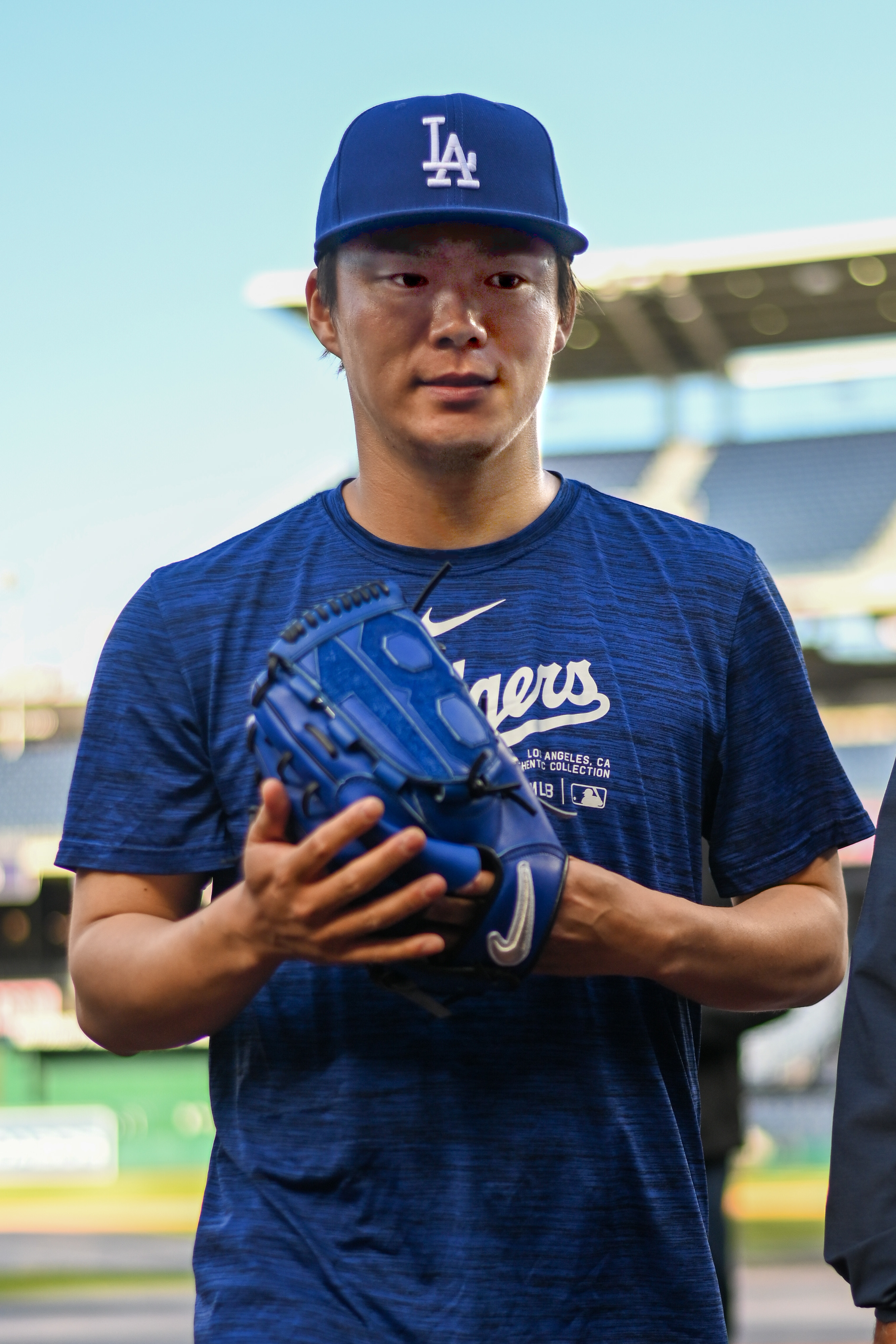
Yoshinobu Yamamoto struck out nine hitters in Game 2.

October 1, 2025 6:08 pm (PDT) at Dodger Stadium in Los Angeles, California 73 °F (23 °C), Clear
Team	1	2	3	4	5	6	7	8	9	R	H	E
Cincinnati	2	0	0	0	0	0	0	2	0	4	6	1
Los Angeles	0	0	1	2	0	4	1	0	X	8	13	3
WP: Yoshinobu Yamamoto (1–0) LP: Zack Littell (0–1); Attendance: 50,465; Boxscore

In the top of the first inning, Sal Stewart drove in Austin Hays and Gavin Lux to give the Reds a 2–0 lead after Teoscar Hernández dropped a fly ball that would have ended the inning. In the bottom of the third inning, Ben Rortvedt scored off a Mookie Betts RBI single, putting the Dodgers on the board and cutting their deficit to 2–1. In the bottom of the fourth inning, back-to-back hits from Kiké Hernández and Miguel Rojas gave the Dodgers a 3–2 lead. In the top of the sixth inning, Yoshinobu Yamamoto escaped a no-out bases-loaded jam to preserve a 3–2 lead for the Dodgers. RBI hits from Shohei Ohtani, Betts, and Teoscar Hernández in the bottom of the sixth inning extended the Dodgers' lead to 7–2. Yamamoto pitched 6 2/3 innings, giving up four hits and two runs (zero earned runs) while striking out nine batters. In the seventh inning, Betts hit an RBI double to extend the Dodgers' lead to 8–2. The Reds scored two more runs in the top of the eighth inning as Stewart hit an RBI single and Tyler Stephenson hit a sacrifice fly to drive in a run for Hayes, cutting the Reds' deficit to 8–4. Then, Alex Vesia escaped a two-out bases-loaded jam to preserve a four-run lead for the Dodgers. Rookie pitcher Roki Sasaki pitched a perfect ninth inning, with Betts catching the final out of the game on lineout from Hayes. The Dodgers advanced to their thirteenth consecutive NLDS and will take on the Philadelphia Phillies.

This was the Reds' eighth consecutive postseason loss, dating back to 2012. As a division, the NL Central moved to 0–10 in playoff series since the 2019 NLCS.

=== Composite line score ===
2025 NLWC (2–0): Los Angeles Dodgers beat Cincinnati Reds

Team	1	2	3	4	5	6	7	8	9	R	H	E
Cincinnati Reds	2	0	0	0	0	0	2	5	0	9	12	2
Los Angeles Dodgers	1	0	5	2	1	6	3	0	0	18	28	3
Total attendance: 101,020 Average attendance: 50,510

== Chicago vs. San Diego ==
This is the second postseason meeting between the Chicago Cubs and the San Diego Padres. Their only other postseason meeting occurred in the 1984 National League Championship Series, in which the Padres won in five games after being down 2–0.

=== Game 1 ===
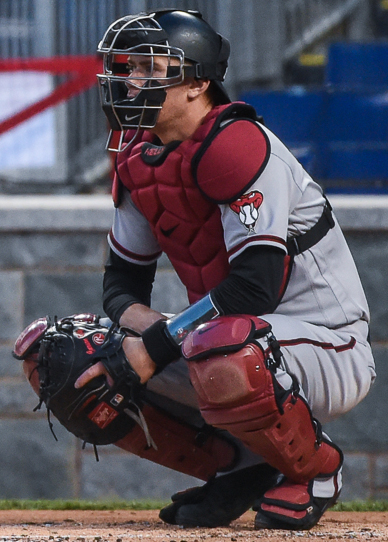
Carson Kelly hit the second of back-to-back home runs in the fifth inning.

September 30, 2025 2:08 pm (CDT) at Wrigley Field in Chicago, Illinois 75 °F (24 °C), Sunny
Team	1	2	3	4	5	6	7	8	9	R	H	E
San Diego	0	1	0	0	0	0	0	0	0	1	4	0
Chicago	0	0	0	0	2	0	0	1	X	3	6	1
WP: Daniel Palencia (1–0) LP: Nick Pivetta (0–1) Sv: Brad Keller (1); Home runs: SD: None; CHI: Seiya Suzuki (1), Carson Kelly (1); Attendance: 39,114; Boxscore

In the top of the second inning, Xander Bogaerts hit a RBI double to give the Padres a 1–0 lead. This snapped a 25-inning postseason scoreless streak for San Diego, dating back to the previous season's Division Series against the Dodgers. Chicago's Seiya Suzuki and Carson Kelly hit back-to-back solo home runs in the bottom of the fifth inning off Nick Pivetta to give the Cubs a 2–1 lead. Nick Pivetta pitched five innings and struck out nine while Matthew Boyd pitched 4 1/3 innings and struck out two batters as the starting pitchers for both teams in Game 1. In the bottom of the eighth inning, Dansby Swanson scored on a Nico Hoerner sacrifice fly to give the Cubs a 3–1 lead. Brad Keller earned the save after pitching a perfect ninth inning, giving the Cubs a 1–0 series lead. Four Cub relievers combined to retire the final 15 Padres to seal the win.

=== Game 2 ===
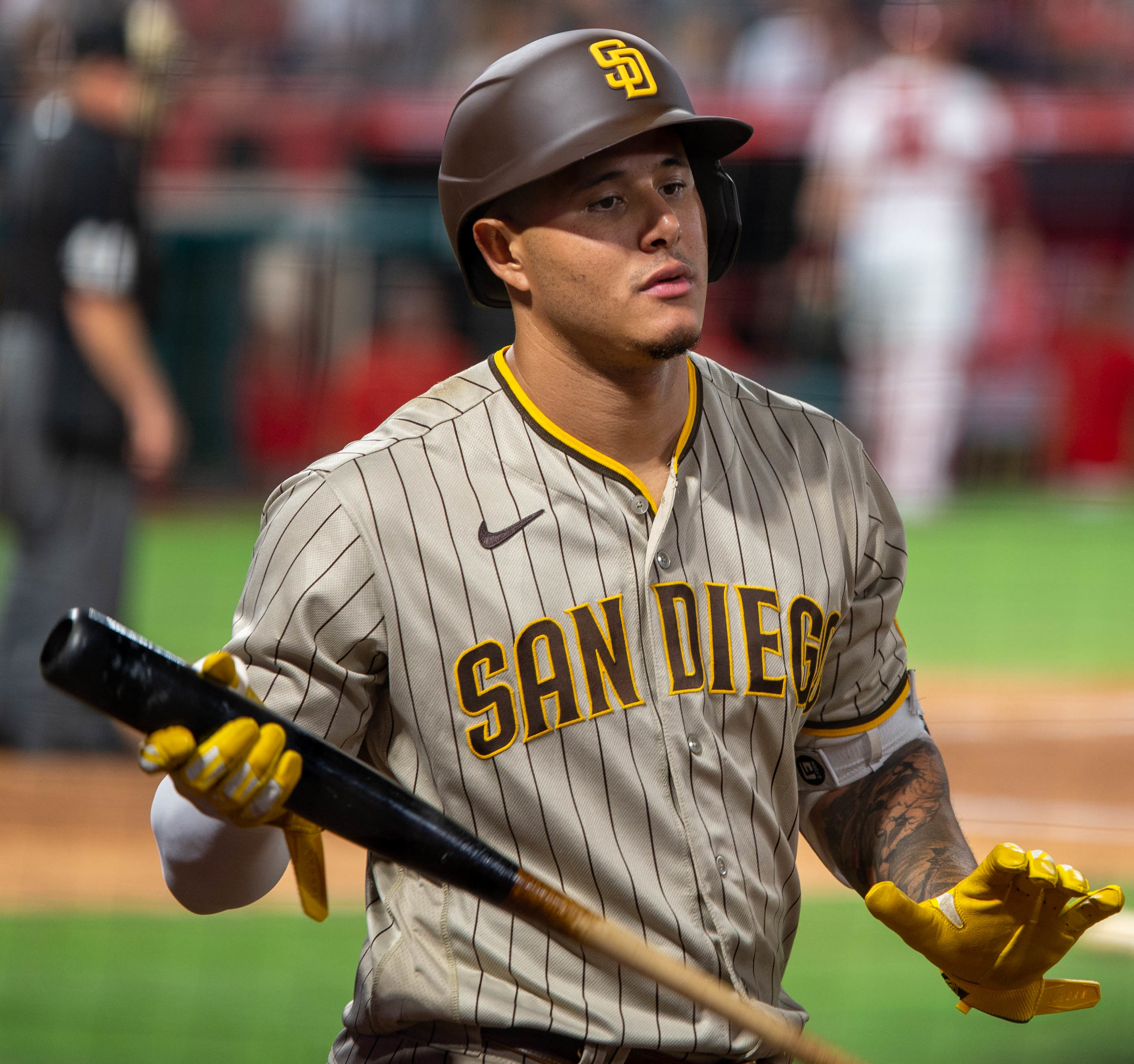
Manny Machado hit a two-run home run in Game 2.

October 1, 2025 3:08 pm (CDT) at Wrigley Field in Chicago, Illinois 72 °F (22 °C), Cloudy
Team	1	2	3	4	5	6	7	8	9	R	H	E
San Diego	1	0	0	0	2	0	0	0	0	3	7	0
Chicago	0	0	0	0	0	0	0	0	0	0	4	0
WP: Adrián Morejón (1–0) LP: Andrew Kittredge (0–1) Sv: Robert Suárez (1); Home runs: SD: Manny Machado (1); CHI: None; Attendance: 41,083; Boxscore

In the top of the first inning, Fernando Tatis Jr. scored on a sacrifice fly from Jackson Merrill. Andrew Kittredge only pitched one inning as he allowed two hits and one earned run while striking out one. Shota Imanaga came in for relief of Kittredge in the second inning and pitched four innings, allowing three hits and two earned runs while striking out three. Dylan Cease pitched 3 2/3 innings as he allowed three hits and zero earned runs while striking out five. Manny Machado hit a two-run home run in the top of the fifth inning to extend the Padres' lead to 3–0. Mason Miller came in to pitch 1 2/3 innings of relief; he gave up zero runs and zero hits while striking out five. Robert Suárez pitched 1 1/3 innings, only giving up one hit to earn the save, giving the Padres a 3–0 victory, and even the series 1–1 to force a winner-take-all Game 3.

Miller had the fastest postseason strikeout pitch since 2008 when he struck out Carson Kelly with a 104.5 mph four-steam fastball, and his eight straight strikeouts in the series tied Josh Hader in 2022 for the most consecutive batters struck out in the postseason at any point. It's also the longest streak to start a postseason career by two, per Sarah Langs.

=== Game 3 ===
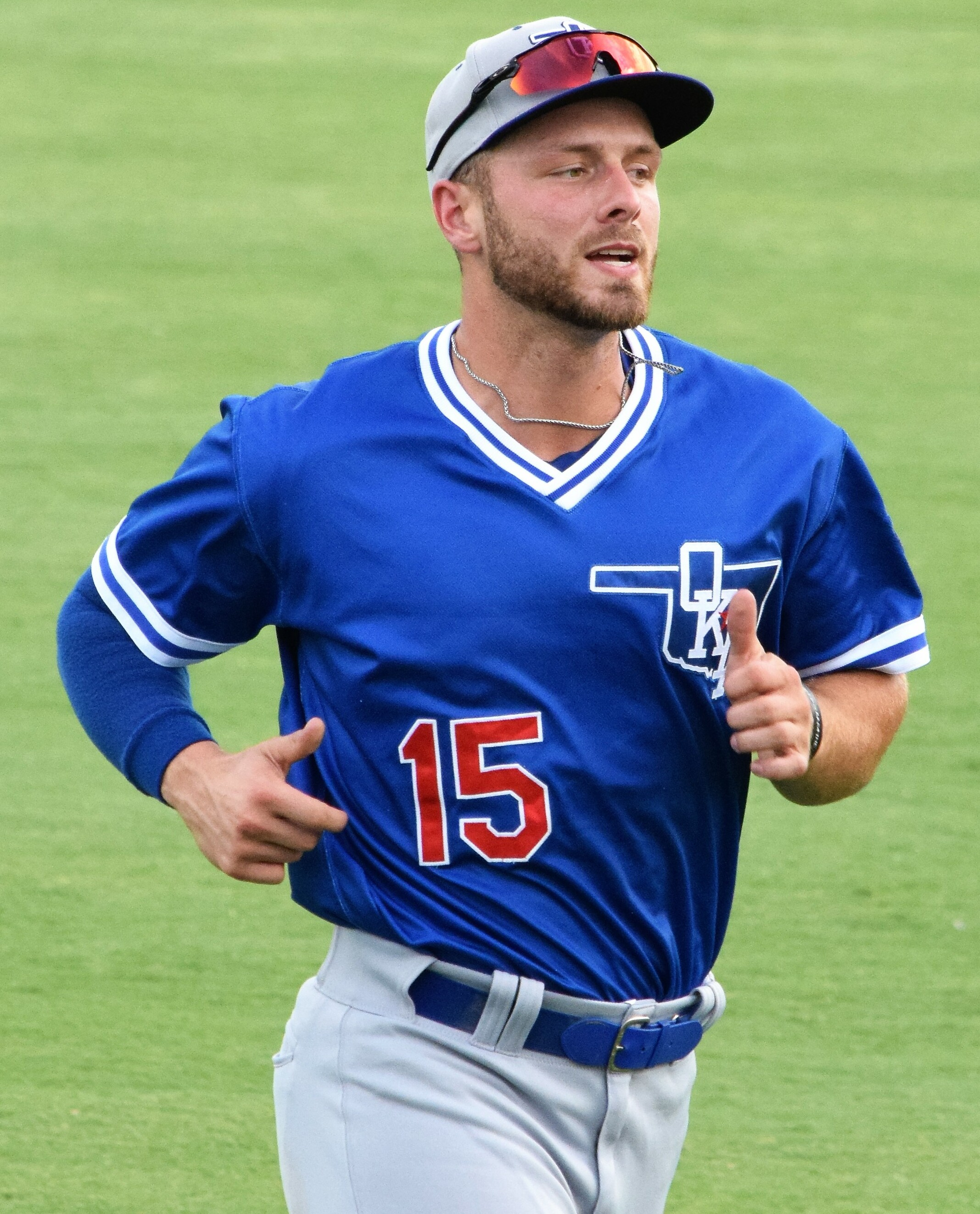
Michael Busch hit a solo home run in the seventh inning to help seal the Cubs series win over the Padres and send them to the NLDS.

October 2, 2025 4:08 pm (CDT) at Wrigley Field in Chicago, Illinois 79 °F (26 °C), Sunny
Team	1	2	3	4	5	6	7	8	9	R	H	E
San Diego	0	0	0	0	0	0	0	0	1	1	7	0
Chicago	0	2	0	0	0	0	1	0	X	3	13	0
WP: Daniel Palencia (2–0) LP: Yu Darvish (0–1) Sv: Andrew Kittredge (1); Home runs: SD: Jackson Merrill (1); CHI: Michael Busch (1); Attendance: 40,895; Boxscore

The Cubs scored first in the bottom of the second inning when Kyle Tucker scored on an RBI single by Pete Crow-Armstrong, giving the Cubs a 1−0 lead. Later in the inning, Seiya Suzuki scored on an RBI walk by Dansby Swanson, extending the Cubs' lead to 2−0. Yu Darvish only pitched one inning, allowing four hits and two runs while striking out one batter; it was his second time lasting less than two innings in an elimination postseason start, following Game 7 of the 2017 World Series. Jameson Taillon pitched four innings, only giving up two hits and zero runs while striking out four batters. In the bottom of the seventh inning, Michael Busch hit a solo home run off Robert Suarez to extend the Cubs' lead to 3−0. Jackson Merrill hit a solo home run in the top of the ninth inning to give the Padres their first run and cut the Cubs' lead to 3−1. Andrew Kittredge earned his first save of the series to secure the series win and send the Cubs to the NLDS against their NL Central division rival Milwaukee Brewers. This was the Cubs' first postseason series victory since 2017, and the first for an NL Central team since 2019.

=== Composite line score ===
2025 NLWC (2–1): Chicago Cubs beat San Diego Padres

Team	1	2	3	4	5	6	7	8	9	R	H	E
San Diego Padres	1	1	0	0	2	0	0	0	1	5	18	0
Chicago Cubs	0	2	0	2	0	0	1	1	0	6	23	1
Total attendance: 121,092 Average attendance: 40,364

== See also ==
- 2025 American League Wild Card Series
