= 2025 National League Division Series =

Teams
Team (Wins)		Manager	Season
Milwaukee Brewers (3)		Pat Murphy	97–65 (.599), GA: 5
Chicago Cubs (2)		Craig Counsell	92–70 (.568), GB: 5
- Dates: October 4–11
- Television: TBS; TruTV (Games 2–5); UniMás (Spanish)
- TV announcers: Alex Faust, Ron Darling, and Lauren Jbara
- Radio: ESPN
- Radio announcers: Jon Sciambi and Doug Glanville
- Umpires: Lance Barksdale (crew chief), Ryan Blakney, Chris Conroy, Mike Estabrook, Will Little, Edwin Moscoso

Teams
Team (Wins)		Manager	Season
Los Angeles Dodgers (3)		Dave Roberts	93–69 (.574), GA: 3
Philadelphia Phillies (1)		Rob Thomson	96–66 (.593), GA: 13
- Dates: October 4–9
- Television: TBS; TruTV (Games 2–4); UniMás (Spanish)
- TV announcers: Brian Anderson, Jeff Francoeur, and Lauren Shehadi
- Radio: ESPN
- Radio announcers: Dave O'Brien and Jessica Mendoza
- Umpires: Nestor Ceja, Adrian Johnson, Nic Lentz, Dan Merzel, Mark Wegner (crew chief), Jim Wolf
- NLWC: Los Angeles Dodgers over Cincinnati Reds (2–0); Chicago Cubs over San Diego Padres (2–1)

The 2025 National League Division Series (NLDS) were the two best-of-five playoff series in Major League Baseball's (MLB) 2025 postseason to determine the participating teams of the 2025 National League Championship Series (NLCS). These matchups were:

- (1) Milwaukee Brewers (NL Central champions) vs. (4) Chicago Cubs (Wild Card Series winner): Brewers won the series, 3–2.
- (2) Philadelphia Phillies (NL East champions) vs. (3) Los Angeles Dodgers (Wild Card Series winner): Dodgers won the series, 3–1.

The team with the better regular season record (higher seed) of each series hosted Games 1, 2, and (if necessary) 5, while the lower seeded team hosted Game 3 and (if necessary) 4.

The Dodgers would go on to sweep the Brewers in the National League Championship Series, then went on to win the World Series in seven games over the American League champion Toronto Blue Jays to repeat as World Series champions.

== Background ==
The top two division winners (first two seeds) are determined by regular season winning percentages. The final two teams are the winners of the National League Wild Card Series, played between the league's third to sixth-seeded teams.

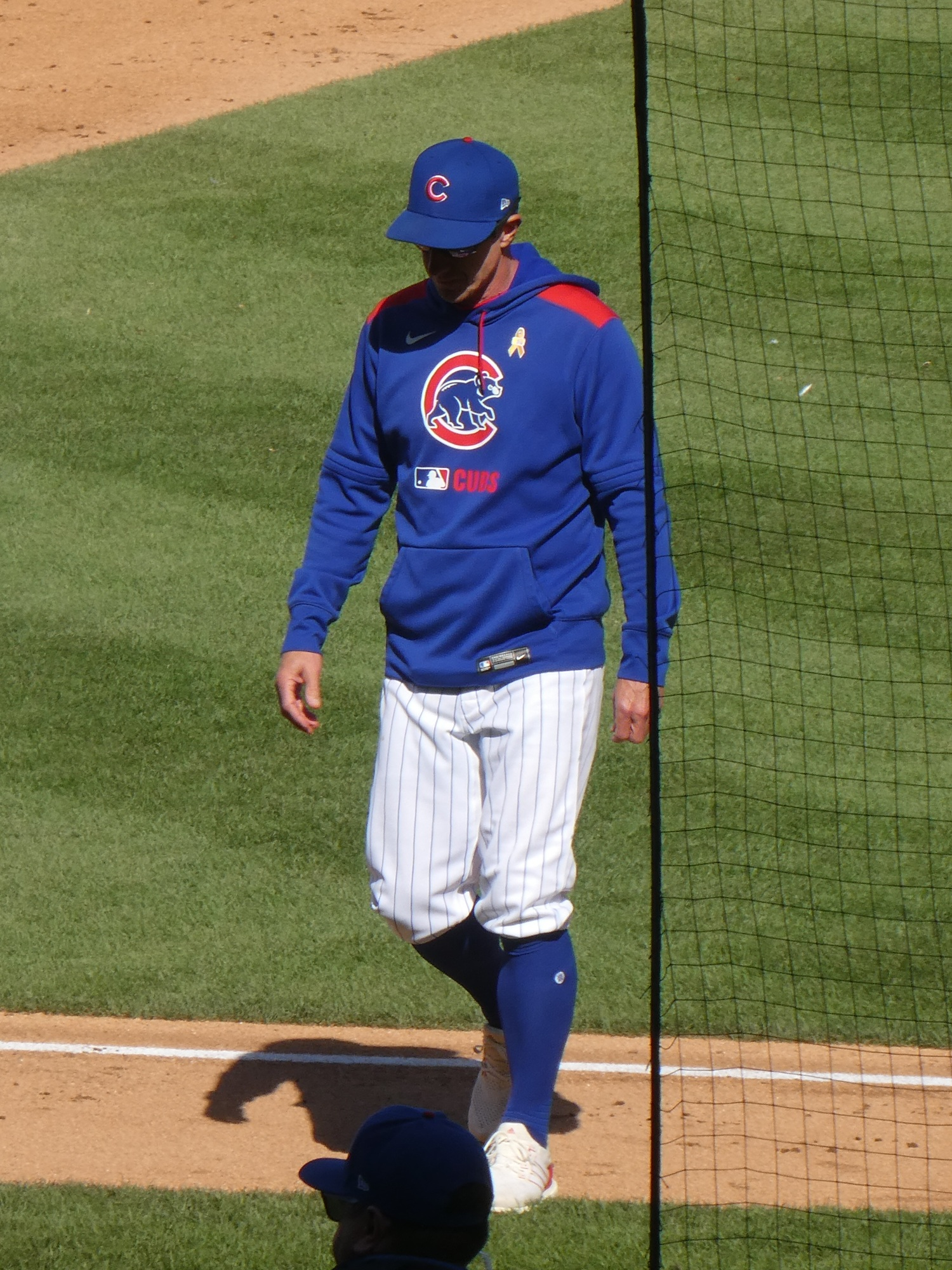
Craig Counsell, Brewers manager from 2015 to 2023, now managing the Cubs.

The Milwaukee Brewers (97–65) clinched their seventh postseason berth in the last eight seasons (third consecutive) on September 13, won the National League Central and earned a first-round bye on September 21, and earned home-field advantage throughout the MLB postseason after the Philadelphia Phillies were defeated by the Minnesota Twins on September 27. This is just the second time Milwaukee has been a top seed in the NL, following their 2018 team. They will play their divisional rivals, the fourth-seeded Chicago Cubs (92–70), who defeated the San Diego Padres in three games in the Wild Card Series. The Cubs won the regular season series, 7–6. This is the first postseason meeting in the I-94 Rivalry, although they did play a Game 163 in 2018 to determine the NL Central division, which the Brewers won 3–1 at Wrigley Field. In 2023, Craig Counsell left the Brewers to become the Cubs manager. In his introductory press conference, he admitted he underestimated the rivalry part of Brewers fans feeling like he just went to “the other side.”

The Philadelphia Phillies (96–66) clinched their fourth straight postseason berth on September 14, won the National League East for the second consecutive season on September 15, and earned a first-round bye via a September 24 victory against the Miami Marlins. They played the National League West champion Los Angeles Dodgers (93–69), who swept the Cincinnati Reds in the Wild Card Series to get to their thirteenth consecutive NLDS. The Phillies won the regular season series, 4–2, which included winning a series a few weeks prior at Dodger Stadium. This was the sixth playoff meeting between the Phillies and the Dodgers, with their most recent match-up coming in the 2009 NLCS, in which Philadelphia won in five games. This was their first playoff meeting prior to an NLCS.

== Matchups ==
=== Milwaukee Brewers vs. Chicago Cubs ===
Milwaukee won the series, 3–2.

Game	Date	Score	Location	Time	Attendance
1	October 4	Chicago Cubs – 3, Milwaukee Brewers – 9	American Family Field	3:05	42,678
2	October 6	Chicago Cubs – 3, Milwaukee Brewers – 7	American Family Field	2:57	42,787
3	October 8	Milwaukee Brewers – 3, Chicago Cubs – 4	Wrigley Field	3:13	40,737
4	October 9	Milwaukee Brewers – 0, Chicago Cubs – 6	Wrigley Field	3:03	41,770
5	October 11	Chicago Cubs – 1, Milwaukee Brewers – 3	American Family Field	2:36	42,743

=== Philadelphia Phillies vs. Los Angeles Dodgers ===
Los Angeles won the series, 3–1.

Game	Date	Score	Location	Time	Attendance
1	October 4	Los Angeles Dodgers – 5, Philadelphia Phillies – 3	Citizens Bank Park	3:00	45,777
2	October 6	Los Angeles Dodgers – 4, Philadelphia Phillies – 3	Citizens Bank Park	3:07	45,653
3	October 8	Philadelphia Phillies – 8, Los Angeles Dodgers – 2	Dodger Stadium	2:54	53,689
4	October 9	Philadelphia Phillies – 1, Los Angeles Dodgers – 2 (11)	Dodger Stadium	3:30	50,563

== Milwaukee vs. Chicago ==
This was the first postseason match-up between the Milwaukee Brewers and Chicago Cubs.

=== Game 1 ===
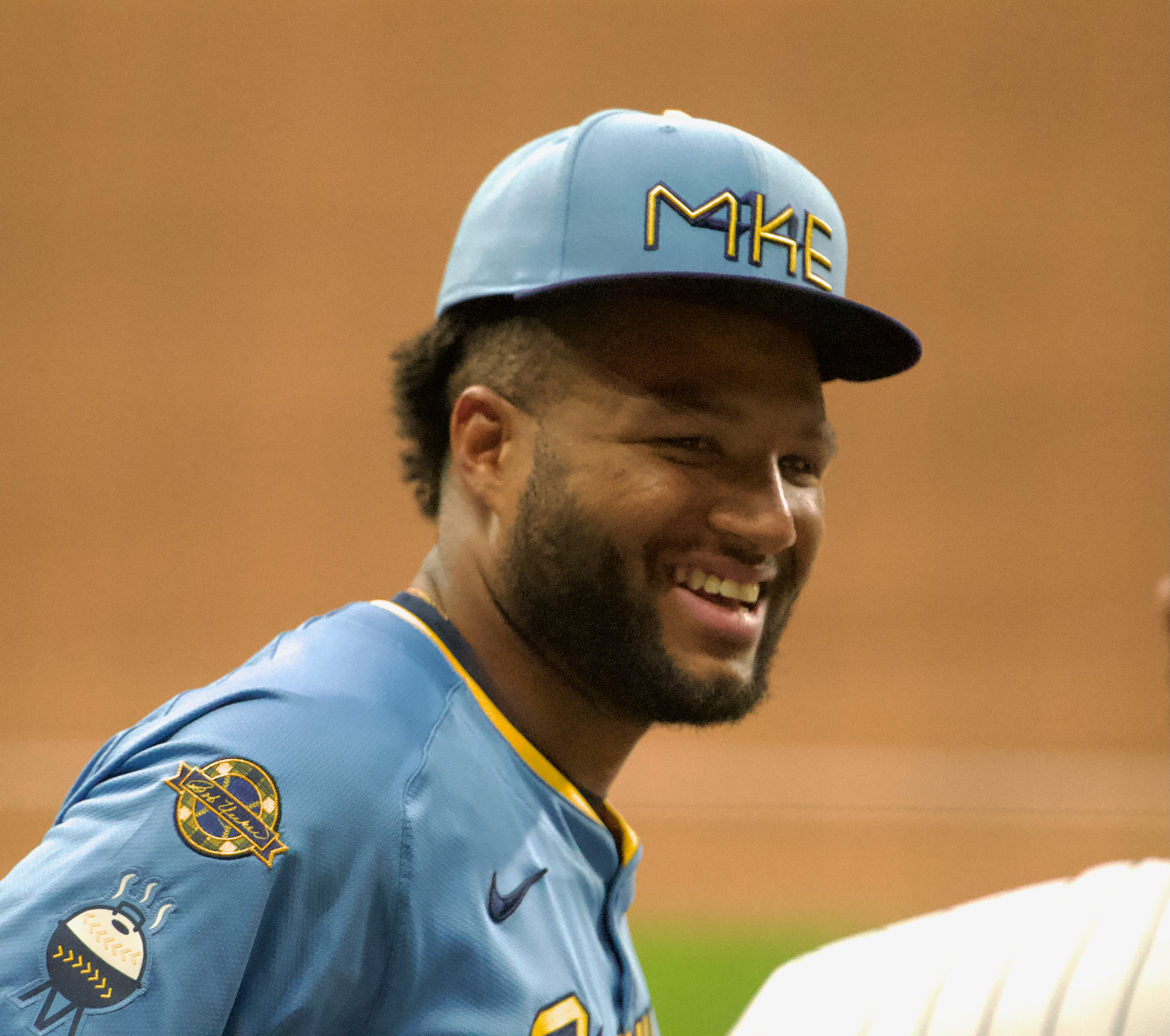
Jackson Chourio, connected three hits in Game 1, including two in the first inning.

October 4, 2025 1:08 pm (CDT) at American Family Field in Milwaukee, Wisconsin 85 °F (29 °C), Sunny
Team	1	2	3	4	5	6	7	8	9	R	H	E
Chicago	1	0	0	0	0	1	0	1	0	3	5	1
Milwaukee	6	3	0	0	0	0	0	0	X	9	13	0
WP: Freddy Peralta (1–0) LP: Matthew Boyd (0–1); Home runs: CHC: Michael Busch (1), Ian Happ (1), Nico Hoerner (1); MIL: None; Attendance: 42,678; Boxscore

In the top of the first inning, Michael Busch hit a leadoff solo home run off Freddy Peralta to give the Cubs a 1–0 lead. In the bottom of the first, Jackson Chourio and Brice Turang scored off RBI doubles from Turang and William Contreras to take the lead for the Brewers at 2–1. The Brewers then extended the lead to 3-1 when Contreras scored after a fielding error by Nico Hoerner. Cubs starter Matthew Boyd only pitched 2/3 innings, allowing four hits and four runs (two earned). Later in the inning, Andrew Vaughn scored off an RBI single by Blake Perkins to extend the Brewers' lead to 4–1. Chourio then scored Sal Frelick and Perkins to further extend the lead to 6–1. Those six runs in the first inning tie a Milwaukee franchise postseason record. In the bottom of the second inning, Caleb Durbin hit a two-run single to allow Contreras and Christian Yelich to score to extend the Brewers' lead to 8–1. Chourio scored Vaughn on an infield single to extend the lead to 9–1. In the top of the sixth inning, Ian Happ hit a solo home run to cut the Brewers' lead to 9–2. Brewers starter Peralta pitched 5 2/3 innings, allowing four hits and two runs while striking out nine batters. A Nico Hoerner home run in the top of the eighth inning further cut the Brewers' lead to 9–3. The Brewers get the final out of the game when Moisés Ballesteros grounds out to first baseman Jake Bauers, as they took Game 1 of the series.

This game tied for the second-largest postseason win differential in Brewers franchise history, tying with their 6–0 win against the Colorado Rockies in Game 3 of the 2018 NLDS.

=== Game 2 ===
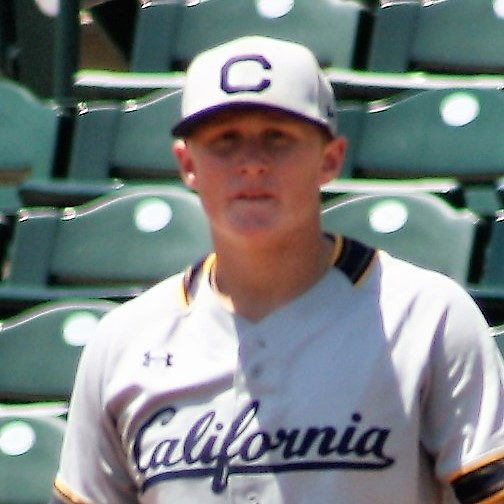
Andrew Vaughn, pictured here with the California Golden Bears, hit a tying three-run homer in Game 2.

October 6, 2025 8:08 pm (CDT) at American Family Field in Milwaukee, Wisconsin 75 °F (24 °C), Roof Closed
Team	1	2	3	4	5	6	7	8	9	R	H	E
Chicago	3	0	0	0	0	0	0	0	0	3	4	1
Milwaukee	3	0	1	3	0	0	0	0	X	7	11	0
WP: Jacob Misiorowski (1–0) LP: Shota Imanaga (0–1); Home runs: CHC: Seiya Suzuki (1); MIL: Andrew Vaughn (1), William Contreras (1), Jackson Chourio (1); Attendance: 42,787; Boxscore

In the top of the first inning, Seiya Suzuki hit a three-run home run off Brewers starter Aaron Ashby to take the lead for the Cubs. In the bottom of the first, Andrew Vaughn hit a three-run home run to left field to tie the game at 3–3. Ashby pitched 1 2/3 innings, allowing three hits and three runs while striking out only one batter. Cubs starter Shota Imanaga pitched 2 2/3 innings, allowing five hits and four runs while striking out three batters. In the bottom of the third inning, William Contreras hit a solo home run to put the Brewers ahead, 4–3. In the bottom of the fourth inning, Jackson Chourio hit a three-run home run to give the Brewers a 7–3 lead. Brewers rookie pitcher Jacob Misiorowski pitched three innings of shutout relief to earn the win. Abner Uribe struck the Cubs out in order in the ninth for the Brewers to take a 2–0 lead over their divisional rivals.

=== Game 3 ===
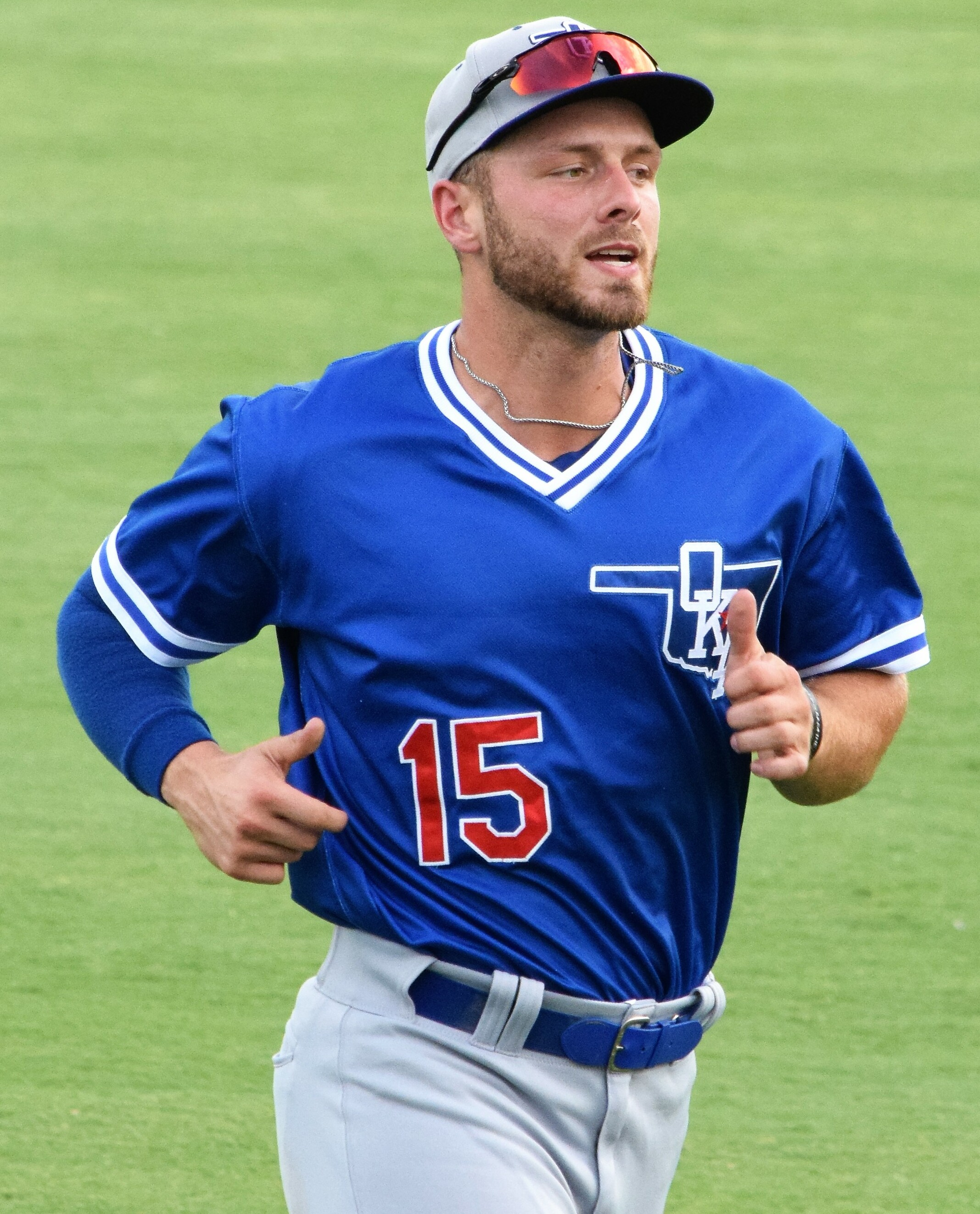
Michael Busch, pictured here with the Oklahoma City Dodgers, hit a leadoff home run in Game 3.

October 8, 2025 4:08 pm (CDT) at Wrigley Field in Chicago, Illinois 61 °F (16 °C), Partly Cloudy
Team	1	2	3	4	5	6	7	8	9	R	H	E
Milwaukee	1	0	0	1	0	0	1	0	0	3	6	0
Chicago	4	0	0	0	0	0	0	0	X	4	8	0
WP: Drew Pomeranz (1–0) LP: Quinn Priester (0–1) Sv: Brad Keller (1); Home runs: MIL: Jake Bauers (1); CHC: Michael Busch (2); Attendance: 40,737; Boxscore

In the top of the first inning, Christian Yelich scored on an RBI sacrifice fly by Sal Frelick, giving the Brewers a 1−0 lead. Michael Busch hit a solo home run to lead off the bottom of the first inning for the Cubs, tying the game at 1−1. Nico Hoerner and Kyle Tucker also scored in the bottom of the first inning off an RBI single by Pete Crow-Armstrong, giving the Cubs a 3−1 lead. Brewers starting pitcher Quinn Priester only pitched 2/3 of an inning, allowing four runs on three hits and two walks while striking out only one batter. Ian Happ would go on to score on a wild pitch by Nick Mears, extending the Cubs' first-inning lead to 4−1. In the top of the fourth inning, Frelick would score on an RBI single by Jake Bauers, which cut the Cubs' lead to 4−2. Cubs' starting pitcher Jameson Taillon pitched four innings, allowing two runs on five hits and one walk while striking out three batters. Bauers hit a lead-off solo home run in the top of the seventh inning to cut the Cubs' lead to one run, 4−3. Brad Keller pitched 1 1/3 innings to earn the save as the Cubs avoided elimination and forced a Game 4.

=== Game 4 ===
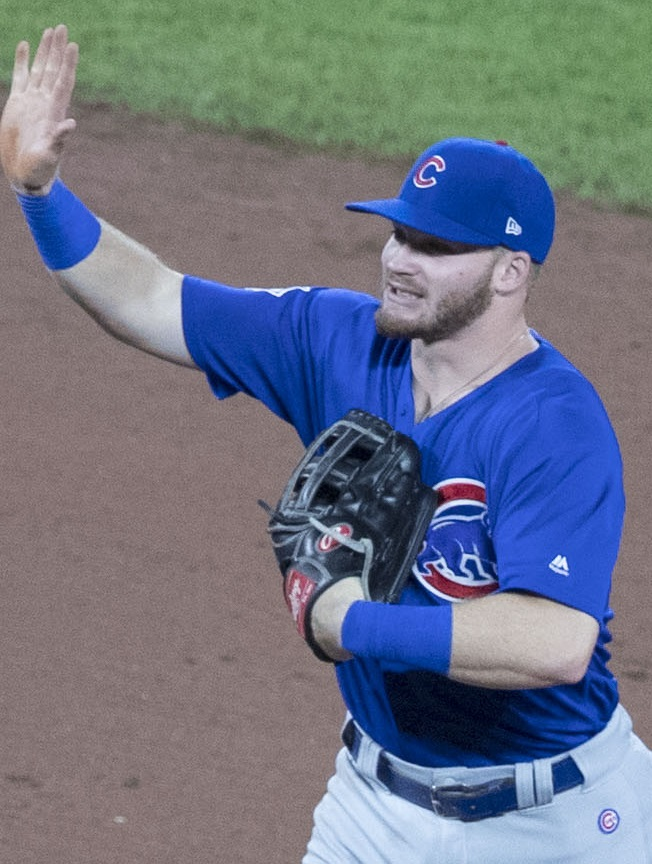
Ian Happ hit a three-run home run in Game 4.

October 9, 2025 8:08 pm (CDT) at Wrigley Field in Chicago, Illinois 58 °F (14 °C), Clear
Team	1	2	3	4	5	6	7	8	9	R	H	E
Milwaukee	0	0	0	0	0	0	0	0	0	0	3	1
Chicago	3	0	0	0	0	1	1	1	X	6	10	0
WP: Daniel Palencia (1–0) LP: Freddy Peralta (1–1); Home runs: MIL: None; CHC: Ian Happ (2), Kyle Tucker (1), Michael Busch (3); Attendance: 41,770; Boxscore

In the bottom of the first inning, Ian Happ hit a three-run home run off Brewers starter Freddy Peralta to give the Cubs a 3–0 lead. Cubs starter Matthew Boyd pitched 4 2/3 scoreless innings, allowing two hits, two walks, and striking out six batters. Peralta pitched four innings, allowing three hits and three runs (all earned) while walking two and striking out six. In the bottom of the sixth inning, Matt Shaw scored Carson Kelly with an RBI single to extend the Cubs' lead to 4–0. In the bottom of the seventh inning, Kyle Tucker pushed the lead to 5–0 with a solo home run to center field. In the bottom of the eighth inning, Michael Busch hit a solo home run, his third of the series, to extend the lead to 6–0. Four Cub relievers shut out the Brewers while Caleb Thielbar got the final out after Caleb Durbin grounded out to even the series and force a winner-take-all Game 5. The loss marked Milwaukee's ninth straight postseason road defeat.

=== Game 5 ===
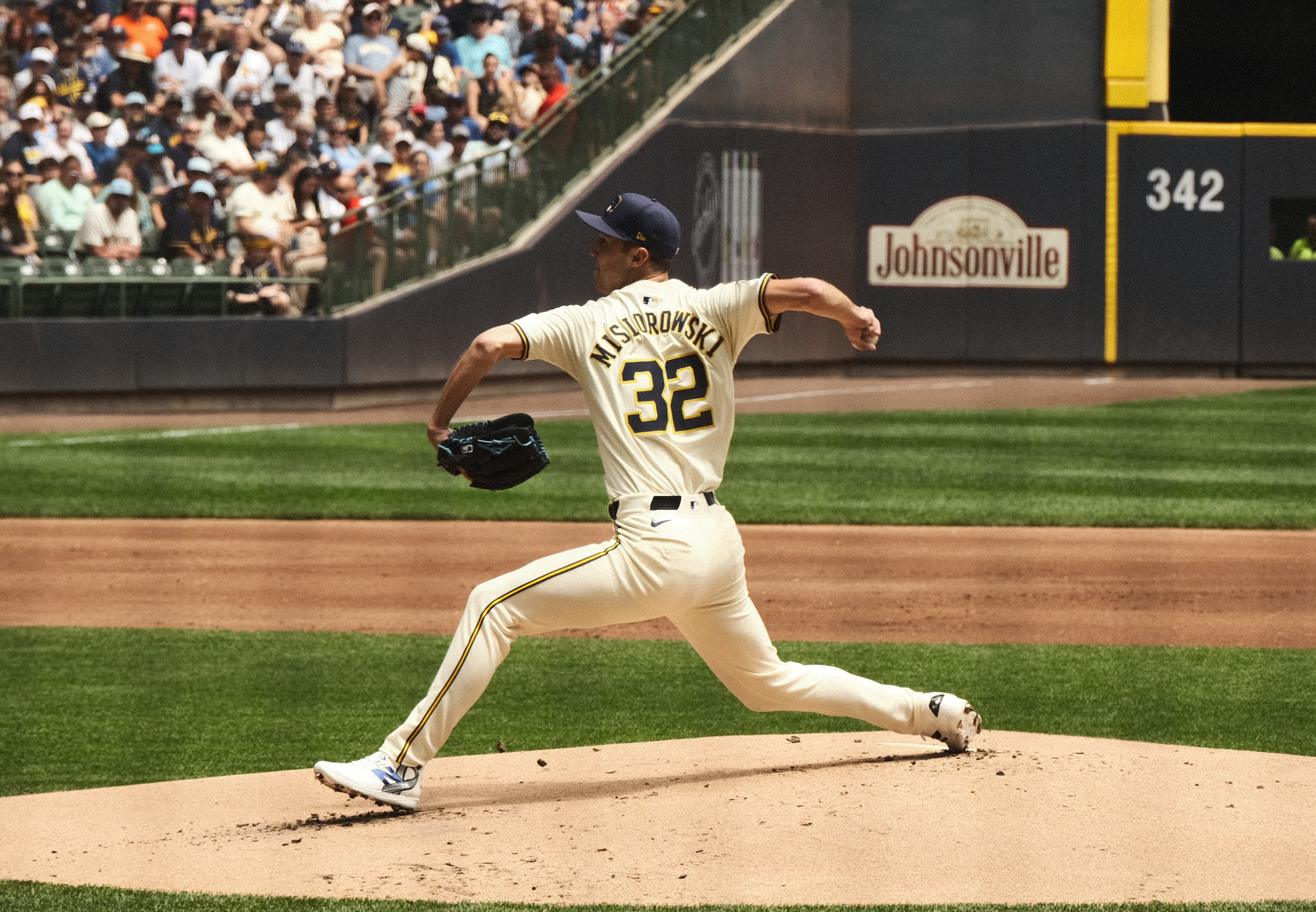
Jacob Misiorowski got the win after pitching four innings in Game 5.

October 11, 2025 7:08 pm (CDT) at American Family Field in Milwaukee, Wisconsin 67 °F (19 °C), Clear, Roof Closed
Team	1	2	3	4	5	6	7	8	9	R	H	E
Chicago	0	1	0	0	0	0	0	0	0	1	4	2
Milwaukee	1	0	0	1	0	0	1	0	X	3	6	0
WP: Jacob Misiorowski (2–0) LP: Colin Rea (0–1) Sv: Abner Uribe (1); Home runs: CHC: Seiya Suzuki (2); MIL: William Contreras (2), Andrew Vaughn (2), Brice Turang (1); Attendance: 42,743; Boxscore

In the bottom of the first inning, William Contreras hit a solo home run off Cubs starter Drew Pomeranz for the Brewers to take the lead at 1–0. In the top of the second inning, Seiya Suzuki hit a solo home run off Brewers reliever Jacob Misiorowski to tie the game at 1–1. Pomeranz pitched one inning, allowing one hit and one run while striking out only one batter. In the bottom of the fourth inning, Andrew Vaughn hit a solo home run to left field to put the Brewers ahead, 2–1. Misiorowski pitched four innings, allowing three hits and only one run while striking out only three batters. In the bottom of the seventh inning, Brice Turang hit a solo home run to extend the Brewers' lead to 3–1. Abner Uribe got the save for the Brewers by pitching the last two innings of winner-take-all Game 5, and the Brewers headed to the NLCS for the third time, and fourth overall LCS, in franchise history.

=== Composite line score ===
2025 NLDS (3–2): Milwaukee Brewers over Chicago Cubs

Team	1	2	3	4	5	6	7	8	9	R	H	E
Chicago Cubs	11	1	0	0	0	2	1	1	1	17	31	4
Milwaukee Brewers	11	3	1	5	0	0	2	0	0	22	39	1
Total attendance: 210,715 Average attendance: 42,143

== Philadelphia vs. Los Angeles ==
This was the sixth playoff match-up between the Philadelphia Phillies and Los Angeles Dodgers, tying Cincinnati–Pittsburgh and Los Angeles–St. Louis for most frequent playoff meetings in the National League. Los Angeles won the first two match-ups in 1977 and 1978, while Philadelphia won the three most recent, in 1983, 2008, and 2009.

=== Game 1 ===
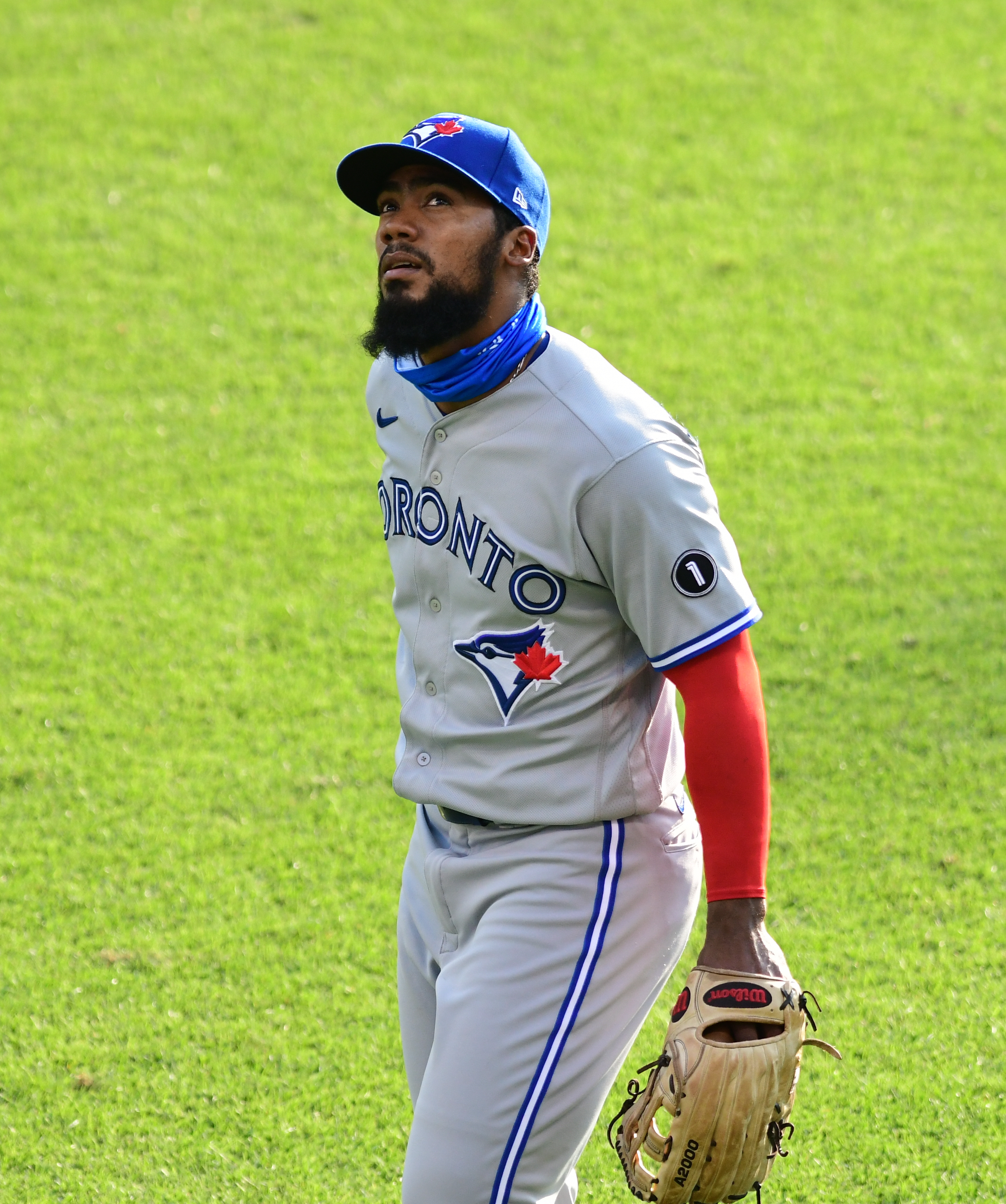
Teoscar Hernández, pictured here with the Toronto Blue Jays, hit a go-ahead three-run homer in Game 1.

October 4, 2025 6:38 pm (EDT) at Citizens Bank Park in Philadelphia, Pennsylvania 77 °F (25 °C), Cloudy
Team	1	2	3	4	5	6	7	8	9	R	H	E
Los Angeles	0	0	0	0	0	2	3	0	0	5	6	1
Philadelphia	0	3	0	0	0	0	0	0	0	3	5	0
WP: Shohei Ohtani (1–0) LP: David Robertson (0–1) Sv: Roki Sasaki (1); Home runs: LAD: Teoscar Hernández (1); PHI: None; Attendance: 45,777; Boxscore

Cristopher Sánchez started the game for Philadelphia, while Dodgers' two-way star Shohei Ohtani became the first player in MLB history to start at pitcher and another position in the same postseason game, and just the fourth player overall to ever start a postseason game at pitcher and another position, with the prior three (Smoky Joe Wood, Babe Ruth and Rick Ankiel) having begun their careers as pitchers before becoming full-time position players later on. In the bottom of the second inning, Ohtani walked Alec Bohm and allowed a single to Brandon Marsh to begin the inning before J. T. Realmuto drove both in with a two-run triple to give the Phillies a 2–0 lead. Harrison Bader scored Realmuto on a sacrifice fly two batters later to make the score 3–0. Ohtani pitched six innings, allowing three runs on three hits, walking one and striking out nine in his first-ever postseason start. Meanwhile, Sánchez allowed just three baserunners in his first 5 2/3 innings, while striking out eight, but was chased from the game with two outs in the sixth inning after allowing a walk to Freddie Freeman, a single to Tommy Edman, and a two-run double to Kiké Hernández in succession to bring the Dodgers within a run at 3–2. Sanchez finished having allowed four total hits and two earned runs in his 5 2/3 innings of work. In the top of the seventh inning, David Robertson, who had come on to record the final out of the sixth, allowed a single to Andy Pages and hit Will Smith to lead off the inning. He was replaced by Matt Strahm, who retired the next two hitters but surrendered a three-run home run to Teoscar Hernández to give the Dodgers a 5–3 lead. Los Angeles' prospective Game 4 starting pitcher Tyler Glasnow relieved Ohtani, getting through the seventh before loading the bases in the bottom of the eighth on a single and two walks. Alex Vesia entered with two outs in the inning and induced a flyout from Edmundo Sosa to escape the bases-loaded jam with the Dodgers' two-run lead still intact. Roki Sasaki earned his first ever save, regular or postseason, by pitching a perfect ninth inning to secure Game 1 for the defending champion Dodgers. This marked the first postseason win for the Dodgers in Philadelphia since Game 2 of the 1978 NLCS.

=== Game 2 ===
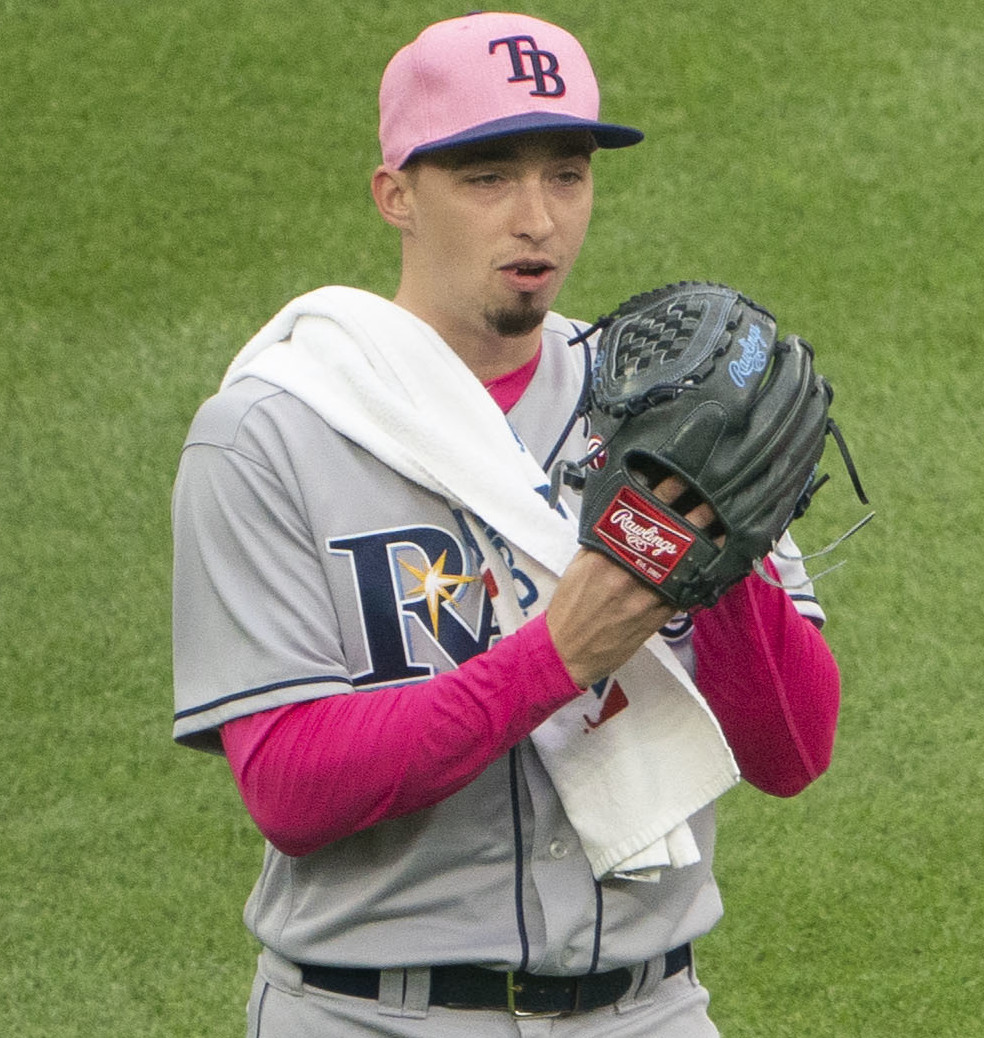
Blake Snell, pictured here with the Tampa Bay Rays, struck out nine over six scoreless innings in Game 2.

October 6, 2025 6:08 pm (EDT) at Citizens Bank Park in Philadelphia, Pennsylvania 78 °F (26 °C), Partly Cloudy
Team	1	2	3	4	5	6	7	8	9	R	H	E
Los Angeles	0	0	0	0	0	0	4	0	0	4	7	0
Philadelphia	0	0	0	0	0	0	0	1	2	3	7	0
WP: Blake Snell (1–0) LP: Jesús Luzardo (0–1) Sv: Roki Sasaki (2); Attendance: 45,653; Boxscore

The game was a scoreless pitching duel through six innings between Blake Snell and Jesús Luzardo. Luzardo allowed three hits while giving up one run and striking out five, but gave up two runs in the seventh. Teoscar Hernández scored the game's first run off a Kiké Hernández fielder's choice, giving the Dodgers a 1−0 lead. Later in the inning, catcher Will Smith hit a two-out RBI single to score Freddie Freeman and Kiké Hernández, extending the lead to 3–0. A Shohei Ohtani RBI single further extended the lead to 4–0. Snell pitched six innings, allowing one hit and four walks while striking out nine. In the bottom of the eighth inning, Max Kepler scored on a Trea Turner RBI single to get the Phillies on the board. In the bottom of the ninth inning, Nick Castellanos hit a two-run RBI double off Blake Treinen to score Alec Bohm and J.T. Realmuto, cutting the Dodgers' lead to 4–3. Roki Sasaki came into the game with a tying run on third and retired Turner to get his second career save as the Dodgers took a 2–0 series lead. On the final out, Tommy Edman threw the ball low, uncommon for a throw from second base to first base, and first baseman Freeman had to stretch unusually far off the bag to make the out.

=== Game 3 ===
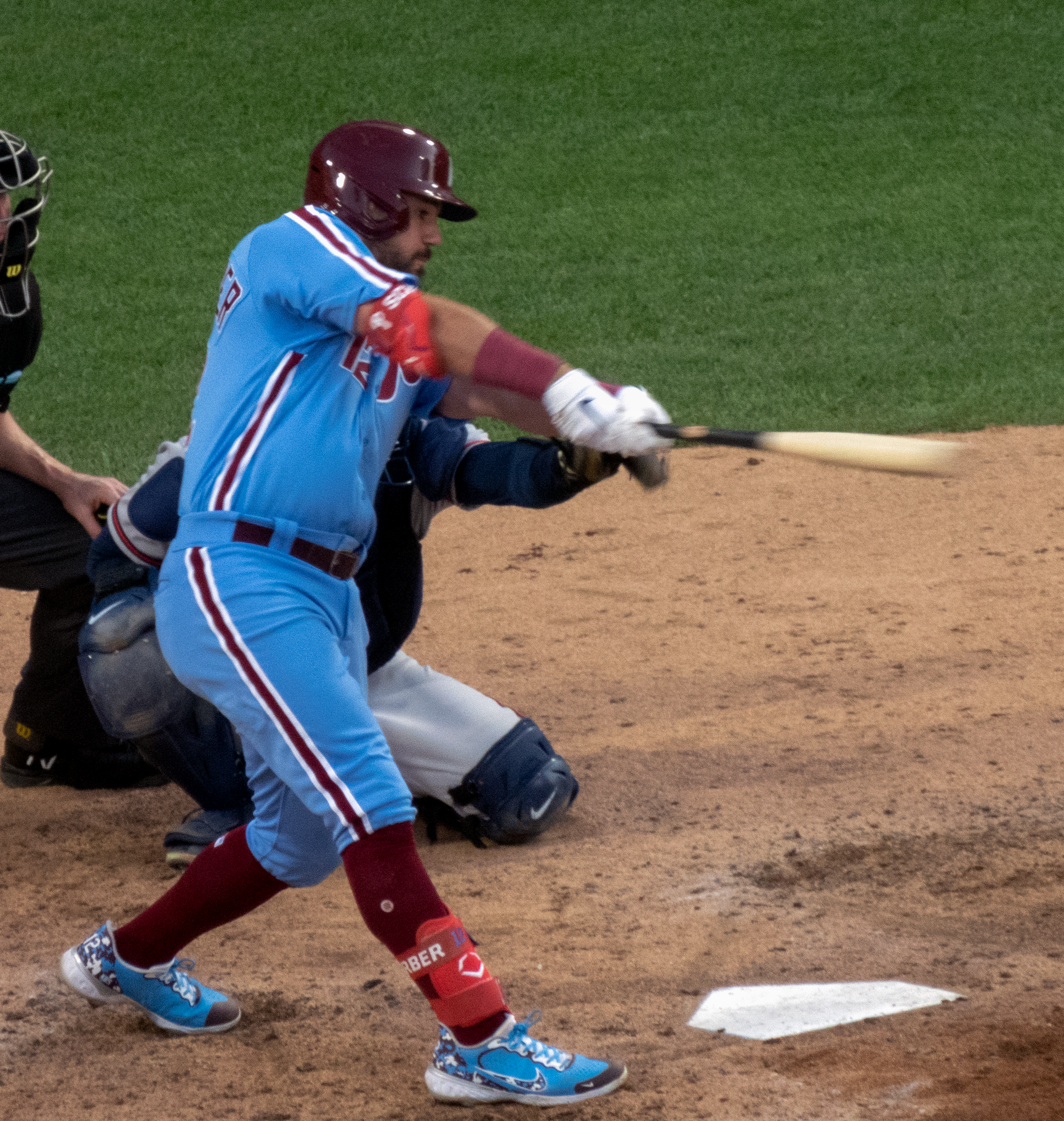
Kyle Schwarber hit two home runs in Game 3.

October 8, 2025 6:08 pm (PDT) at Dodger Stadium in Los Angeles, California 69 °F (21 °C), Clear
Team	1	2	3	4	5	6	7	8	9	R	H	E
Philadelphia	0	0	0	3	0	0	0	5	0	8	12	0
Los Angeles	0	0	1	0	0	0	0	0	1	2	8	2
WP: Ranger Suárez (1–0) LP: Yoshinobu Yamamoto (0–1); Home runs: PHI: Kyle Schwarber 2 (2), J. T. Realmuto (1); LAD: Tommy Edman (1); Attendance: 53,689; Boxscore

Phillies starter Aaron Nola pitched two innings while striking out only three batters. In the bottom of the third inning, Tommy Edman hit a leadoff solo home run off Phillies reliever Ranger Suárez to take a 1–0 lead for the Dodgers. In the top of the fourth inning, Kyle Schwarber hit a solo home run to tie the game at 1−1. Later in the inning, Bryce Harper scored on a throwing error from Teoscar Hernández and Brandon Marsh hit a sacrifice fly, putting the Phillies ahead, 3–1. Dodgers starter Yoshinobu Yamamoto pitched four innings, allowing six hits and three runs while striking out only two batters. In the top of the eighth inning, J. T. Realmuto hit a solo home run to left center field to extend the Phillies' lead to 4–1. A two-run RBI single from Trea Turner and a two-run home run from Schwarber in the top of the eighth inning further extended the lead to 8–1. In the bottom of the ninth inning, Edman scored Kiké Hernández to cut the Phillies' lead to 8–2. The Phillies got the final out when Shohei Ohtani hit a fly out to right field and they avoided a series sweep to force a Game 4.

=== Game 4 ===
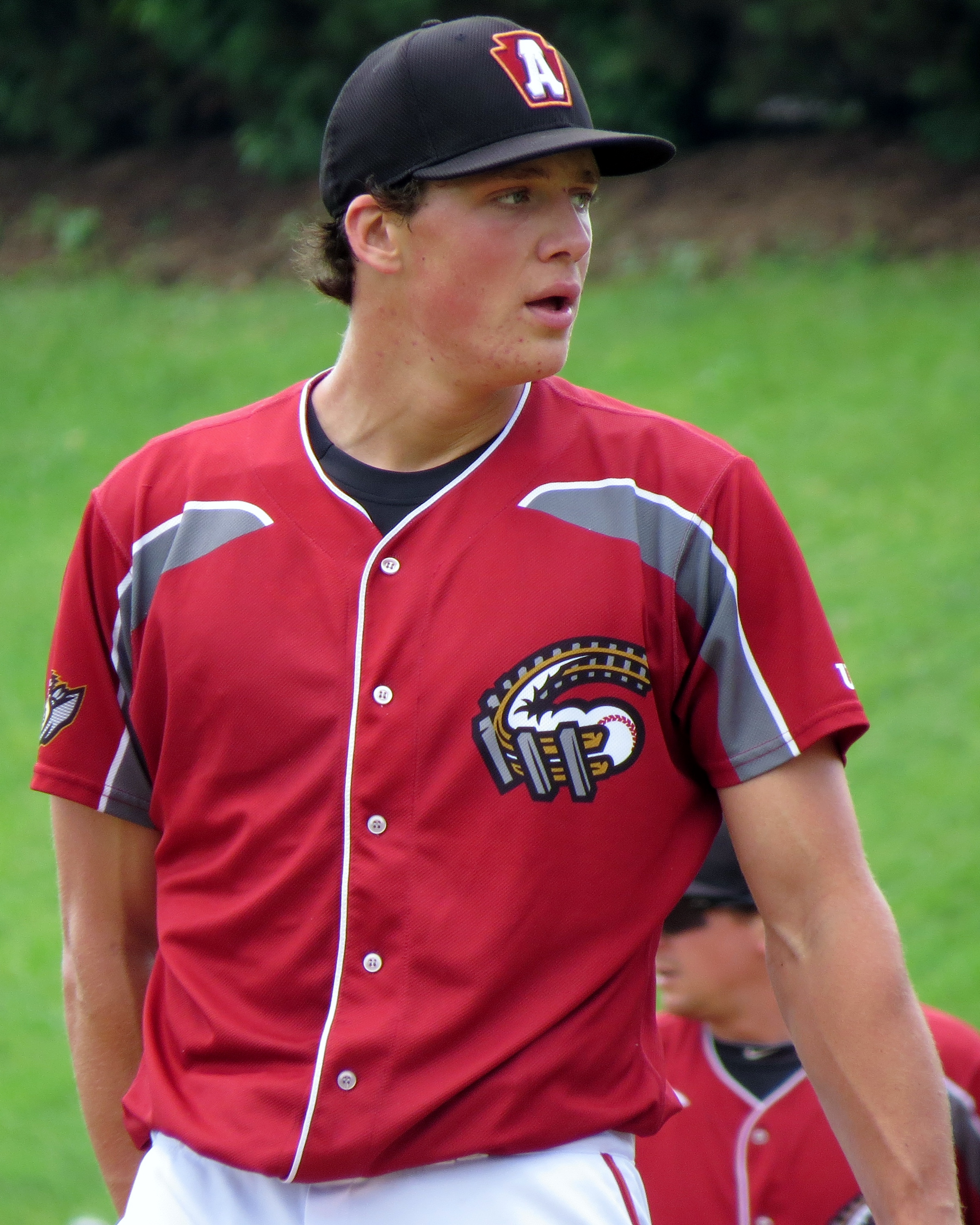
Tyler Glasnow, pictured here with the Altoona Curve, struck out eight over six scoreless innings in Game 4.

October 9, 2025 3:08 pm (PDT) at Dodger Stadium in Los Angeles, California 75 °F (24 °C), Partly Cloudy
Team	1	2	3	4	5	6	7	8	9	10	11	R	H	E
Philadelphia	0	0	0	0	0	0	1	0	0	0	0	1	4	2
Los Angeles	0	0	0	0	0	0	1	0	0	0	1	2	8	1
WP: Alex Vesia (1–0) LP: Jesús Luzardo (0–2); Attendance: 50,563; Boxscore

External videos
- Game 4 full replay on the MLB's official YouTube channel

Game 4 started scoreless for the first six innings, with Dodgers starter Tyler Glasnow pitching six innings, giving up zero runs on two hits and three walks while striking out eight batters. In the top of the seventh inning, with a runner on first and nobody out, the Dodgers attempted to turn a double play on Max Kepler's groundball to first, but relief pitcher Emmet Sheehan was unable to secure the second out while covering first base, allowing the ball to go into the dugout and advancing Kepler to second. Nick Castellanos followed with an RBI double, giving the Phillies a 1−0 lead. Phillies starter Cristopher Sánchez pitched 6 1/3 innings, allowing five hits and two walks, while striking out five batters, and was relieved by closer Jhoan Durán after allowing a walk and a single with one out in the seventh inning. After a groundout advanced both runners, Shohei Ohtani was intentionally walked to load the bases. Duran then walked Mookie Betts on a full count, forcing in pinch runner Justin Dean to tie the game at 1–1 with the run charged to Sánchez, before striking out Teoscar Hernández to end the threat. Beginning in the eighth inning, Dodgers closer Roki Sasaki pitched three innings of relief without allowing a baserunner, with three Phillies relievers combining to do the same over the same period. In the top of the 11th inning, Bryce Harper walked and reached second on a wild pitch by Dodger reliever Alex Vesia, but was stranded there. In the bottom of the inning, Tommy Edman singled off of Philadelphia's Game 2 starter Jesus Lúzardo with one out, and Max Muncy singled with two outs before Luzardo was lifted for Orion Kerkering. Kerkering walked Kiké Hernandez to load the bases. The next batter, Andy Pages, hit a comebacker that Kerkering was unable to field cleanly; Kerkering decided to attempt a force play at home, but the throw was well wide of catcher J. T. Realmuto. The error allowed pinch runner Hyeseong Kim to score, sealing the series and sending the Dodgers to the NLCS for the second consecutive year. Kerkering's error was the second time in league history that a postseason series ended on an error, following the walk-off error by Rougned Odor in Game 3 of the 2016 ALDS.

This series was a repeat of the NLCS in 1978 between both teams. Just like in that series, the Dodgers stole the first two games on the road in Philadelphia, then the Phillies took Game 3 in a rout, and then the Dodgers won Game 4 in extra innings. With the win by the Dodgers, the playoff history between these two teams is tied at three series wins each.

In addition to the Phillies being eliminated, the Philadelphia Eagles and Philadelphia Flyers also lost on the same night. This triple loss occurred for the first time since October 16, 1983, when the Phillies were eliminated by the Baltimore Orioles in Game 5 of the 1983 World Series.

=== Composite line score ===
2025 NLDS (3–1): Los Angeles Dodgers beat Philadelphia Phillies

Team	1	2	3	4	5	6	7	8	9	10	11	R	H	E
Los Angeles Dodgers	0	0	1	0	0	2	8	0	1	0	1	13	29	4
Philadelphia Phillies	0	3	0	3	0	0	1	6	2	0	0	15	28	3
Total attendance: 195,682 Average attendance: 48,921

== See also ==
- 2025 American League Division Series
- Brewers–Cubs rivalry
