= Brewers–Cubs rivalry =

Major League Baseball rivalry

- Location: Midwestern United States
- Teams: Milwaukee Brewers; Chicago Cubs
- First meeting: June 13, 1997; Wrigley Field, Chicago, Illinois; Brewers 6, Cubs 4
- Latest meeting: September 9, 2026; American Family Field, Milwaukee, Wisconsin; Brewers 8, Cubs 6
- Next meeting: April 26, 2027; American Family Field, Milwaukee, Wisconsin
- Stadiums: Brewers: American Family Field; Cubs: Wrigley Field

Statistics
- Total meetings: 474
- All-time series: Brewers, 242–232 (.511)
- Regular season series: Brewers, 239–230 (.510)
- Postseason results: Brewers, 3–2 (.600)
- Largest victory: Brewers, 18–1 (August 2, 2010); Cubs, 19–5 (April 30, 2008)
- Longest win streak: Brewers, 11 (April 24 – September 18, 2021); Cubs, 9 (July 30 – September 22, 2015)
- Current win streak: Brewers, 3

Post-season history
- 2025 NL Division Series: Brewers won, 3–2

Locations of the Milwaukee Brewers and Chicago Cubs

The Brewers–Cubs rivalry is a Major League Baseball (MLB) rivalry between the Milwaukee Brewers and Chicago Cubs. Both teams are members of MLB's National League (NL) Central Division. The rivalry is also sometimes known as the I-94 Rivalry, because the two teams' ballparks are located only 83 miles (134 km) from each other off Interstate 94 (I-94).

The Brewers and Cubs have been playing each other in spring training Cactus League games since the Brewers franchise began as the Seattle Pilots in 1969. However, the rivalry did not begin until 1998, when the Brewers moved from the American League (AL) Central Division to the National League Central. Until then, the Brewers had a rivalry with Chicago's AL team, the White Sox.

The Brewers–Cubs rivalry has been ranked among the best and most competitive in baseball. It is even similar to and fierce as the Bears-Packers rivalry. Conversely, the notion of a rivalry continues to be questioned by Cubs players, who cite the omnipresence of Cubs fans in attendance at games played against the Brewers in Milwaukee. At least 16% of the lift in Milwaukee attendance for Cubs games is attributed to Cubs fans. This is despite the Brewers' efforts to restrict Cubs fans' ability to purchase tickets.

In 2018, the teams played a Game 163 to determine the NL Central division championship, which the Brewers won 3–1 at Wrigley Field.

In 2023, Craig Counsell left the Brewers to become the Cubs manager. He admitted he may have underestimated the rivalry part of Brewers fans feeling like he just went to "the other side".

The first postseason meeting between the two teams took place in 2025 in the NLDS, which the Brewers won in five games.

== Background ==
=== 1953–1965: Braves–Cubs rivalry ===
The rivalry between the two cities originated from when the Braves were in Milwaukee from 1953 to 1965. Although, not in the same division (the Braves were in the National League West, while the Cubs played in the National League East), the proximity between the two ballparks created an intense atmosphere. The short-lived rivalry died when the Braves moved to Atlanta in 1966. The Braves went 158-112 against the Cubs before they left for Atlanta in 1966.

When the Brewers moved from the AL to the NL in 1998, one of the reasons given for the switch was to rekindle the rivalry the Braves and Cubs had.

=== 1997–1998: First meetings ===
The Brewers and Cubs met for the first official time on June 13, 1997, in interleague play, a 4–2 Brewers victory at Wrigley Field in Chicago. They met for the first time as division rivals on June 15, 1998, a 6–5 Cubs victory also in Wrigley Field.

=== 1999–2016: Geographic foes and division races; Cubs end the curse ===
After battling for the NL Central title in both 2007 and 2008, the teams met at Miller Park for the Brewers' home opener in 2009. During the second game of the series on April 11, the Brewers had the highest attendance in Major League Baseball for the rivalry game.

During games in Milwaukee, it was sometimes common for there to be many Cubs fans in attendance. This has been largely due to the ticket availability at Miller Park; Wrigley Field has routinely sold out in the past, so it has often been easier and cheaper for Cubs fans to watch games at Miller Park (with Amtrak's Hiawatha providing low-cost access between both cities and trains often packed during rivalry games either way), leading Cubs fans to call Miller Park by the derisive nickname of "Wrigley North". During the 2006 season, the Milwaukee Brewers started the "Take Back Miller Park" campaign to regain home field advantage. Since then, the dominating presence of Cubs fans has somewhat dwindled as the Brewers have become more popular with local fans following the sale of the team from Bud Selig to Mark Attanasio. Through the 2007 and 2008 seasons, the rivalry became more intense with both teams battling for the National League Central crown, a prize the Cubs eventually claimed both seasons. During 2008, the Brewers had a sellout streak going at the start of a mid-July series at home against the Cubs. That season, Milwaukee also made their first playoff appearance since the 1982 World Series as a wild card entrant, off the backs of a blockbuster CC Sabathia trade. Before the Brewers and Cubs lost in the NLDS, ending their season's in disappointment after what looked like a chance at their the rivals first playoff series.

The rivalry was less prominent in the early 2010s, as both teams finished well out of playoff contention in 2010, while in 2011 the Brewers claimed the NL Central title and the Cubs struggled to a 71–91 record. The Brewers lost in the NLCS to the Cardinals, but it was their most successful season since their World Series appearance in 1982. However, the Brewers could not capitalize off this success as they lost slugger Prince Fielder in free agency and Ryan Braun lost most of a season due to suspension after PED use, which left a hole in the line-up. They quickly fell to the middle of the pack in the National League and did not compete for the division until 2017.

To try to turn things around, the Cubs hired executive Theo Epstein, who was considered one of the best general managers in baseball. With his hiring in 2011, they began a complete rebuild. After the 2011 season ended, former Brewer player, coach and manager Dale Sveum was hired by the Cubs to be their new manager in 2012. The Brewers in 2012, won 13 of 17 games against the Cubs to take the all-time series at 118–117. In 2015, the Brewers hired Craig Counsell, who was a popular player on the team from 2007 to 2011, to manage.

By 2015, Chicago was reaping the benefits of their rebuild with a roster that featured talented young players, such as Kris Bryant, Anthony Rizzo, Javier Baez, Jake Arrieta and Addison Russell. They had also hired experienced manager Joe Maddon to manage the young core. In 2015, they made the postseason as a wild card and upset the rival St. Louis Cardinals in the NLDS, but were swept by the New York Mets in the NLCS. In 2016, the Cubs added key veterans, such as John Lackey, Jon Lester, and Aroldis Chapman (trade deadline) to a title favorite. That season, they broke through winning a World Series against Cleveland in a seven-game classic, ending their 108-year drought.

=== 2018–2023: Brewers dominance ===
In 2017, a Brewers team led by young prospects and veterans challenged the defending World Series champion Cubs for the division; the two played in a key end of the season series which led to the Cubs clinching their second division crown in a row, finishing the season 92–70, six games ahead of the 86–76 Brewers.

The rivalry reached a pivotal stage in 2018. After narrowly missing the playoffs in 2017, the Brewers made several acquisitions during the off-season. They signed free agent outfielder Lorenzo Cain and acquired former Miami Marlins outfielder Christian Yelich in a blockbuster trade. These acquisitions, both occurring on January 25, 2018, helped the Brewers match the Cubs in terms of offensive prowess. During the regular season, the Cubs won eight of first nine meetings, but the Brewers ended up winning the last four series against the Cubs and both teams were tied for first place in the NL Central after 162 games. The teams faced off in a tie-breaker game for the division title. Milwaukee won 3–1, winning the division and securing home-field advantage throughout the National League playoffs. The Brewers also enjoyed a large contingent of Brewers fans at Wrigley Field during this game, which marked a turn in a series where Cubs fans normally "took over" Miller Park. The Cubs were relegated to the Wild Card Game, which they lost to the Colorado Rockies. The Brewers went on to beat the Rockies in the NLDS but lost to the Los Angeles Dodgers in the NLCS.

The two would remain competitive in 2019 and 2020, with the Brewers making the playoffs in 2019 as a wild card and the Cubs winning the division in the pandemic shortened 2020 season (the Brewers would make the playoffs as a wild card that year). However, it cooled off for a few years following the Cubs' selloff of their 2016 World Series core leading to two under .500 seasons, while the Brewers won the division in 2021 and narrowly missed the playoffs in 2022; however, they never made it past the first round. In 2023, the rivalry came back when this time a young Cubs team led by prospects and resurgent veterans (led by free agent signings Cody Bellinger, Dansby Swanson and Marcus Stroman) challenged a first place Brewers team for the division. The Brewers would win the division, the Cubs would collapse and miss the playoffs, and the Brewers would once again be knocked out in the first round.

=== 2024–present: Craig Counsell, the first official playoff meeting, and Brewers first championship ===
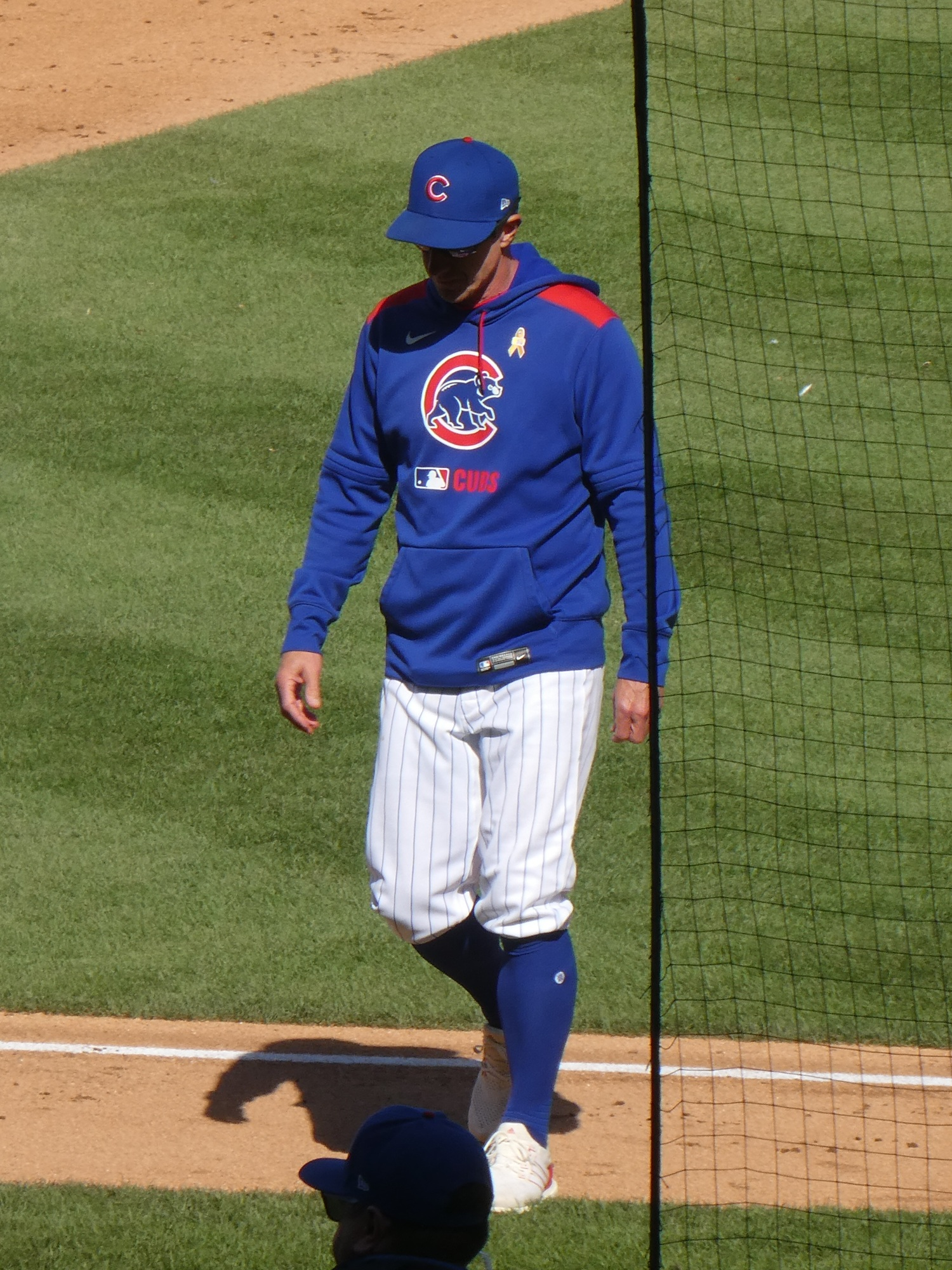
Craig Counsell, Brewers' manager from 2015 to 2023, managing the Cubs since 2024.

On November 6, 2023, Counsell was hired as the manager of the Chicago Cubs on a five-year contract worth over $40 million, making him the highest-paid manager in Major League Baseball history, both in annual average value and total value. The move was described as a surprise by observers, who had expected Counsell to sign with the New York Mets or Cleveland Guardians if he did not remain with the Brewers. A few days after Counsell's departure, the Brewers promoted longtime bench coach Pat Murphy to manager.

As a result of Counsell's unexpected move to the Cubs, the sign for Craig Counsell Park, located in his hometown of Whitefish Bay, was vandalized. He was also greeted with a swarm of booing from fans upon his return to American Family Field in May 2024.

Despite the Counsell acquisition, the Cubs could not build on their near playoff appearance in 2023. They finished with an 83–79 record, the same record as last year and ultimately missed the playoffs. On the other hand, the Brewers continued to exceed expectation under Murphy, going 93–69 and winning the division for the second season in a row. Even with significant injury troubles and starting pitching woes, Murphy was awarded the 2024 NL Manager of the Year Award, making him the first Brewers manager to earn this distinction. The Brewers, however, once again faltered in the postseason, losing to the New York Mets in three games in the Wild Card Series.

In 2025, the two teams faced each other in their first postseason series. In the series, Milwaukee, who had the best record in the NL that season, handily won both home games. At Wrigley Field, the Cubs rallied to win a close Game 3 and a blowout Game 4. In the decisive Game 5 at American Family Field, the Brewers won the game, 3–1, advancing to the NLCS for the first time since 2018, where they lost to the Los Angeles Dodgers. After Game 5, the Brewers posed with the "L" flag in a team photo, which enraged many Cubs fans.

A year later, the Brewers won their first World Series, breaking through to defeat the Padres in the NLDS, the Dodgers in the NLCS, and Rays in the World Series. It was the first championship for the NL Central division since the 2016 Cubs won a decade before. It was the Brewers first championship in their franchise history and the second for the city of Milwaukee (after the 1957 Braves).

== Season-by-season results ==
Brewers vs. Cubs Season-by-Season Results
1990s (Cubs, 14–13)

Season	Season series		at Milwaukee Brewers	at Chicago Cubs	Overall series	Notes
1997	Cubs	2‍–‍1	no games	Cubs, 2‍–‍1	Cubs; 2‍–‍1	Only interleague season
1998	Tie	6‍–‍6	Tie, 3‍–‍3	Tie, 3‍–‍3	Cubs; 8‍–‍7	With MLB's expansion and realignment, Brewers are transferred from the AL Central and are placed in NL Central with the Cubs
1999	Tie	6‍–‍6	Tie, 3‍–‍3	Tie, 3‍–‍3	Cubs; 14‍–‍13	

2000s (Cubs, 84–76)

Season	Season series		at Milwaukee Brewers	at Chicago Cubs	Overall series	Notes
2000	Brewers	7‍–‍6	Brewers, 5‍–‍1	Cubs, 5‍–‍2	Tie; 20‍–‍20	
2001	Brewers	9‍–‍8	Cubs, 4‍–‍3	Brewers, 6‍–‍4	Brewers; 29‍–‍28	
2002	Brewers	10‍–‍7	Brewers, 6‍–‍4	Brewers, 4‍–‍3	Brewers; 39‍–‍35	
2003	Cubs	10‍–‍6	Cubs, 7‍–‍0	Brewers, 6‍–‍3	Tie; 45‍–‍45	
2004	Cubs	10‍–‍7	Tie, 5‍–‍5	Cubs, 5‍–‍2	Cubs; 55‍–‍52	
2005	Brewers	9‍–‍7	Brewers, 7‍–‍3	Cubs, 4‍–‍2	Cubs; 62‍–‍61	
2006	Tie	8‍–‍8	Cubs, 4‍–‍3	Brewers, 5‍–‍4	Cubs; 70‍–‍69	
2007	Cubs	9‍–‍6	Cubs, 4‍–‍2	Cubs, 5‍–‍4	Cubs; 79‍–‍75	
2008	Cubs	9‍–‍7	Cubs, 5‍–‍2	Brewers, 5‍–‍4	Cubs; 88‍–‍82	Brewers clinched NL Wild Card and first postseason appearance since 1982 against the Cubs in game 162 of the regular season in Milwaukee with a victory along with a Mets' loss.
2009	Cubs	10‍–‍7	Cubs, 5‍–‍4	Cubs, 5‍–‍3	Cubs; 98‍–‍89	

2010s (Tie, 91–91)

Season	Season series		at Milwaukee Brewers	at Chicago Cubs	Overall series	Notes
2010	Cubs	9‍–‍6	Cubs, 6‍–‍3	Tie, 3‍–‍3	Cubs; 107‍–‍95	
2011	Brewers	10‍–‍6	Brewers, 8‍–‍1	Cubs, 5‍–‍2	Cubs; 113‍–‍105	
2012	Brewers	13‍–‍4	Brewers, 7‍–‍2	Brewers, 6‍–‍2	Brewers; 118‍–‍117	Cubs hire former Brewers manager Dale Sveum as manager. Brewers win 10 straight home meetings (April 2011 – May 2012).
2013	Brewers	13‍–‍6	Brewers, 7‍–‍3	Brewers, 6‍–‍3	Brewers; 131‍–‍123	MLB realignment results in teams meeting 19 times per season beginning in 2013.
2014	Cubs	11‍–‍8	Brewers, 5‍–‍4	Cubs, 7‍–‍3	Brewers; 139‍–‍134	
2015	Cubs	14‍–‍5	Cubs, 8‍–‍2	Cubs, 6‍–‍3	Cubs; 148‍–‍144	
2016	Cubs	11‍–‍8	Brewers, 5‍–‍4	Cubs, 7‍–‍3	Cubs; 159‍–‍152	Cubs win 2016 World Series
2017	Cubs	10‍–‍9	Cubs, 7‍–‍3	Brewers, 6‍–‍3	Cubs; 169‍–‍161	
2018	Cubs	11‍–‍9	Tie, 5‍–‍5	Cubs, 6‍–‍4	Cubs; 180‍–‍170	Both teams were 95–67, tied atop the division after 162 games, so they played a tie-breaker game to determine the division champion. The Brewers won the tie-breaker in Chicago, 3–1, to win the division, while the Cubs were relegated to the Wild Card Game.
2019	Brewers	10‍–‍9	Brewers, 7‍–‍3	Cubs, 6‍–‍3	Cubs; 189‍–‍180	

2020s (Brewers, 62–43)

Season	Season series		at Milwaukee Brewers	at Chicago Cubs	Overall series	Notes
2020	Tie	5‍–‍5	Cubs, 2‍–‍1	Brewers, 4‍–‍3	Cubs; 194‍–‍185	Season shortened to 60 games (with 10 meetings) due to COVID-19 pandemic.
2021	Brewers	15‍–‍4	Brewers, 7‍–‍2	Brewers, 8‍–‍2	Brewers; 200‍–‍198	
2022	Cubs	10‍–‍9	Brewers, 5‍–‍4	Cubs, 6‍–‍4	Brewers; 209‍–‍208	Last year of 19 divisional games against each other. Balanced schedule starts in 2023 only 13 games against each other.
2023	Brewers	7‍–‍6	Brewers, 4‍–‍3	Tie, 3‍–‍3	Brewers; 216‍–‍214	
2024	Brewers	8‍–‍5	Brewers, 5‍–‍2	Tie, 3‍–‍3	Brewers; 224‍–‍219	Cubs hire former Brewers manager Craig Counsell as manager.
2025	Cubs	7‍–‍6	Tie, 3‍–‍3	Cubs, 4‍–‍3	Brewers; 230‍–‍226	
2025 NLDS	Brewers	3‍–‍2	Brewers, 3‍–‍0	Cubs, 2‍–‍0	Brewers; 233‍–‍228	First meeting in the postseason. Home team wins all five games.
2026	Brewers	9‍–‍4	Cubs, 4‍–‍3	Brewers, 6‍–‍0	Brewers; 242‍–‍232	Brewers win 2026 World Series, their first in franchise history.
2027	Tie	0‍–‍0	Upcoming at Brewers, April 26‍–‍28, August 30‍–‍September 1	Upcoming at Cubs, May 17‍–‍20, September 6‍–‍8	Brewers; 242‍–‍232	

Summary of Results

Season	Season series		at Milwaukee Brewers	at Chicago Cubs	Notes
Regular Season	Brewers	239‍–‍230	Brewers, 124‍–‍109	Cubs, 121‍–‍115	
Postseason games	Brewers	3‍–‍2	Brewers, 3‍–‍0	Cubs, 2‍–‍0	
Postseason series	Brewers	1‍–‍0	Brewers, 1‍–‍0	Cubs, 1‍–‍0	NLDS: 2025
Regular and postseason	Brewers	242‍–‍232	Brewers, 127‍–‍109	Cubs, 123‍–‍115	

== See also ==
Sports rivalries of the same cities/states:

- Bears–Packers rivalry
