= 2015 in baseball =

The following are the baseball events of the year 2015 throughout the world.

== Champions ==
=== Major League Baseball ===
- World Series: Kansas City Royals
  - American League: Kansas City Royals
    - Eastern Division: Toronto Blue Jays
    - Central Division: Kansas City Royals
    - Western Division: Texas Rangers
    - Wild Card 1: New York Yankees
    - Wild Card 2: Houston Astros
  - National League: New York Mets
    - Eastern Division: New York Mets
    - Central Division: St. Louis Cardinals
    - Western Division: Los Angeles Dodgers
    - Wild Card 1: Pittsburgh Pirates
    - Wild Card 2: Chicago Cubs

Postseason

Wild Card Game (ALWC, NLWC)
4	NY Yankees	0
5	Houston	1
4	Pittsburgh	0
5	Chicago Cubs	1

Division Series (ALDS, NLDS)
1	Kansas City	3
5	Houston	2
American League
2	Toronto	3
3	Texas	2
1	St. Louis	1
5	Chicago Cubs	3
National League
2	LA Dodgers	2
3	NY Mets	3

League Championship Series (ALCS, NLCS)
1	Kansas City	4
2	Toronto	2
5	Chicago Cubs	0
3	NY Mets	4

World Series
AL1	Kansas City	4
NL3	NY Mets	1

=== Other champions ===
- Minor League Baseball
  - AAA
    - Championship: Fresno Grizzlies (Houston Astros)
      - International League: Columbus Clippers (Cleveland Indians)
      - Pacific Coast League: Fresno Grizzlies (Houston Astros)
    - Mexican League: Tigres de Quintana Roo
  - AA
    - Eastern League: Bowie Baysox (Baltimore Orioles)
    - Southern League: Chattanooga Lookouts (Minnesota Twins)
    - Texas League: Midland RockHounds (Oakland Athletics)
  - High A
    - California League: Rancho Cucamonga Quakes (Los Angeles Dodgers)
    - Carolina League: Myrtle Beach Pelicans (Chicago Cubs)
    - Florida State League: Charlotte Stone Crabs (Tampa Bay Rays)
  - A
    - Midwest League: West Michigan Whitecaps (Detroit Tigers)
    - South Atlantic League: Hickory Crawdads (Texas Rangers)
  - Short Season A
    - New York–Penn League: West Virginia Black Bears (Pittsburgh Pirates)
    - Northwest League: Hillsboro Hops (Arizona Diamondbacks)
  - Rookie
    - Appalachian League: Greeneville Astros (Houston Astros)
    - Arizona League: AZL White Sox (Chicago White Sox)
    - Dominican Summer League: DSL Giants (San Francisco Giants)
    - Gulf Coast League: GCL Red Sox (Boston Red Sox)
    - Pioneer League: Missoula Osprey (Arizona Diamondbacks)
    - Venezuelan Summer League: VSL Tigers (Detroit Tigers)
  - Arizona Fall League: Scottsdale Scorpions (BOS/CLE/DET/MIN/SFG)
- Independent baseball leagues
  - American Association: Laredo Lemurs
  - Atlantic League: Somerset Patriots
  - Can-Am League: Trois-Rivières Aigles
  - Frontier League: Traverse City Beach Bums
  - North Country Baseball League: Newburgh Newts
  - Pacific Association: San Rafael Pacifics
  - Pecos League: Roswell Invaders
- Amateur
  - College
    - College World Series: University of Virginia
    - NCAA Division II: University of Tampa
    - NCAA Division III: Cortland State
    - NAIA: Lewis-Clark State College
    - Junior College Baseball World Series: Northwest Florida State College
    - Cape Cod Baseball League: Yarmouth–Dennis Red Sox
  - Youth
    - Big League World Series: Puerto Rico D13 (Guayama, Puerto Rico)
    - Junior League World Series: Chung Shan Junior Little League (Taichung, Taiwan)
    - Little League World Series: Tokyo Kitasuna Little League (Tokyo, Japan)
    - Senior League World Series: West University Little League (Houston, Texas)
- International
  - National Teams
    - 18U Baseball World Cup: USA
    - 12U Baseball World Cup: USA
    - Pan Am Games : Canada
    - World Port tournament: Cuba
    - 2015 WBSC Premier12: South Korea
    - 2015 Asian Baseball Championship: South Korea
  - International club team competitions
    - Caribbean Series : Pinar del Río (Cuba)
    - European Cup: Neptunes (Netherlands)
  - Domestic leagues
    - Australian Baseball League: Perth Heat
    - China Baseball League: Jiangsu Pegasus
    - Cuban National Series: Ciego de Ávila
    - Dominican League: Gigantes del Cibao
    - Dutch Baseball League : Curaçao Neptunus
    - France – Division Élite: Rouen 76
    - Italian Baseball League: Telemarket Rimini
    - Japan Series: Fukuoka SoftBank Hawks
      - Pacific League: Fukuoka SoftBank Hawks
      - Central League: Tokyo Yakult Swallows
    - Korean Series: Doosan Bears
    - Mexican Pacific League: Tomateros de Culiacán
    - Puerto Rican League : Cangrejeros de Santurce
    - Taiwan Series: Lamigo Monkeys
    - Venezuelan League : Caribes de Anzoátegui

== Awards and honors ==
=== Major League Baseball ===
- Baseball Hall of Fame honors
- BBWAA election
  - Craig Biggio
  - Randy Johnson
  - Pedro Martínez
  - John Smoltz
- MVP Award
  - American League: Josh Donaldson (TOR)
  - National League: Bryce Harper (WSH)
- Cy Young Award
  - American League: Dallas Keuchel (HOU)
  - National League: Jake Arrieta (CHC)
- Rookie of the Year
  - American League: Carlos Correa (HOU)
  - National League: Kris Bryant (CHC)
- Manager of the Year Award
  - American League: Jeff Banister (TEX)
  - National League: Joe Maddon (CHC)

Major League Baseball awards

- World Series MVP: Salvador Pérez (KC)
- League Championship Series MVP
  - American League: Alcides Escobar (KC)
  - National League: Daniel Murphy (NYM)
- All-Star Game MVP: Mike Trout (LAA)
- Roberto Clemente Award: Andrew McCutchen (PIT)
- Reliever of the Year Award
  - American League: Andrew Miller (NYY)
  - National League: Mark Melancon (PIT)
- Hank Aaron Award
  - American League: Josh Donaldson (TOR)
  - National League: Bryce Harper (WSH)

Sporting News awards

- Player of the Year Award: Josh Donaldson (TOR)
- Starting pitcher of the Year Award
  - American League: Dallas Keuchel (HOU)
  - National League: Zack Greinke (LAD)
- Relief pitcher of the Year Award
  - American League: Dellin Betances (NYY)
  - National League: Mark Melancon (PIT)
- Rookie of the Year Award
  - American League: Carlos Correa (HOU)
  - National League: Kris Bryant (CHC)
- Comeback Player of the Year Award
  - American League: Prince Fielder (TEX)
  - National League: Matt Harvey (NYM)
- Manager of the Year Award
  - American League: Paul Molitor (MIN)
  - National League: Terry Collins (NYM)
- Executive of the Year Award: Alex Anthopoulos (TOR)

Players Choice Awards

- Player of the Year: Josh Donaldson (TOR)
- Outstanding Players
  - American League: Josh Donaldson (TOR)
  - National League: Bryce Harper (WSH)
- Outstanding Pitchers
  - American League: Dallas Keuchel (HOU)
  - National League: Zack Greinke (LAD)
- Outstanding Rookies
  - American League: Carlos Correa (HOU)
  - National League: Kris Bryant (CHC)
- Comeback Players of the Year
  - American League: Prince Fielder (TEX)
  - National League: Matt Harvey (NYM)
- Always Game: Jose Altuve (HOU)
- Marvin Miller Man of the Year: Adam Jones (BAL)

Others

- Luis Aparicio Award: Miguel Cabrera (DET)

Silver Slugger Awards

American League			National League
Player	Team	Position	Player	Team
Miguel Cabrera	(DET)	First baseman	Paul Goldschmidt	(AZ)
Jose Altuve	(HOU)	Second baseman	Dee Gordon	(MIA)
Josh Donaldson	(TOR)	Third baseman	Nolan Arenado	(COL)
Xander Bogaerts	(BOS)	Shortstop	Brandon Crawford	(SF)
Mike Trout	(LAA)	Outfielder	Bryce Harper	(WSH)
Nelson Cruz	(SEA)	Outfielder	Andrew McCutchen	(PIT)
J. D. Martinez	(CWS)	Outfielder	Carlos González	(COL)
Brian McCann	(NYY)	Catcher	Buster Posey	(SF)
Kendrys Morales	(KC)	Designated hitter/Pitcher	Madison Bumgarner	(SF)

Gold Glove Awards

American League			National League
Player	Team	Position	Player	Team
Eric Hosmer	(KC)	First baseman	Paul Goldschmidt	(AZ)
Jose Altuve	(HOU)	Second baseman	Dee Gordon	(MIA)
Manny Machado	(BAL)	Third baseman	Nolan Arenado	(COL)
Alcides Escobar	(KC)	Shortstop	Brandon Crawford	(SF)
Yoenis Céspedes	(DET/NYM)	Left fielder	Starling Marte	(PIT)
Kevin Kiermaier	(TB)	Center fielder	A. J. Pollock	(AZ)
Kole Calhoun	(LAA)	Right fielder	Jason Heyward	(STL)
Salvador Pérez	(KC)	Catcher	Yadier Molina	(STL)
Dallas Keuchel	(HOU)	Pitcher	Zack Greinke	(LAD)

=== Minor League Baseball ===
- International League MVP: Matt Hague (Buffalo Bisons [TOR])
- Pacific Coast League MVP: Matt Duffy (Fresno Grizzlies [HOU])
- Eastern League MVP: Brock Stassi (Reading Fightin Phils [PHI])
- Southern League MVP: Max Kepler (Chattanooga Lookouts [MIN])
- Texas League Player of the Year: A. J. Reed (Corpus Christi Hooks [HOU])
- Baseball America MiLB Player of the Year: Blake Snell (TB)
- Joe Bauman Home Run Award: A. J. Reed (Lancaster JetHawks/Corpus Christi Hooks [HOU])
- Dernell Stenson Sportsmanship Award: Yadiel Rivera (Surprise Saguaros [MIL])
- Joe Black Award: Adam Engel (Glendale Desert Dogs [CWS])
- Larry Doby Award: Kyle Schwarber (CHC)
- USA Today MiLB Player of the Year: Blake Snell (TB)

== Events ==
=== January ===
- January 6 – For the first time since 1955, the BBWAA elected four players to the Hall of Fame. Pitchers Randy Johnson, Pedro Martínez and John Smoltz, all in their first year on the ballot, received 97.3, 91.1 and 82.9 percent of the ballots, respectively, while second baseman/catcher Craig Biggio, in his third year on the ballot, received 82.7 percent of the votes after falling two votes short of induction in 2014. Four players had been inducted in the 1955 voting; those players were Joe DiMaggio, Ted Lyons, Dazzy Vance and Gabby Hartnett. It is also the first time that three pitchers are enshrined in the same year, as well as the second consecutive year that three players in their first year on the ballot are inducted; Greg Maddux, Tom Glavine and Frank Thomas had been inducted in 2014.
- January 20 – Max Scherzer signs a $210 million, seven-year contract with the Washington Nationals. In his five seasons with the Detroit Tigers, Scherzer had posted an 82–35 record, including a 21–3 record in 2013, during which he won the American League's Cy Young Award. The contract is the second-largest for a pitcher, after Clayton Kershaw's $215 million, seven-year deal, which runs from 2014 to 2020. The previous highest contract for a right-handed pitcher was the $180 million, seven-year deal from 2013 to 2019, signed by Scherzer's ex-Tiger teammate, Justin Verlander.

=== February ===
- February 8 :
  - The Perth Heat defeated the Adelaide Bite, 12–5, in the third and final game of the Australian Baseball League championship series to capture the Claxton Shield for the second straight season and the fourth time in five seasons.
  - The Pinar del Río club from Cuba defeated the Tomateros de Culiacán from Mexico in the finals of the 2015 Caribbean Series. It was Cuba's first Caribbean Series win since 1960.
    - February 11: Jackie Robinson West Little League is stripped of its 2014 LLWS United States title due to the use of ineligible players Mountain Ridge West Little League is awarded the U.S. title by default.

=== March ===
- March 13 – The Boston Red Sox officially announced the signing of 19-year-old Cuban prospect Yoan Moncada. The Red Sox reached an agreement for a signing bonus of $31.5 million, the largest ever for a minor league contract. Because Boston had already exceeded its bonus pool for the 2014–15 international signing period, the team will pay a full 100 percent tax on Moncada's bonus, bringing the total cost for his services to $63MM. On top of that, the Red Sox will now be restricted from signing any international amateur for more than $300K in the 2015–16 and the 2016–17 international signing periods. Moncada will likely start this season playing second base for Class A Greenville Drive.

=== April ===
- April 5 – In the very first home opener played at Wrigley Field, the St. Louis Cardinals defeat the Chicago Cubs 3–0. Jason Heyward collects three hits in his Cardinal debut, Matt Holliday drives in two of the three Cardinal runs, and Adam Wainwright throws six innings of five-hit ball. The game is the first at the newly renovated Wrigley, which features a giant video board in left field and images of Ernie Banks, who had died in January, covering the bleachers.
- April 8 – At Dodger Stadium, in the Los Angeles Dodgers' third game of the season, Adrián González hits three home runs off San Diego Padres pitcher Andrew Cashner, leading the Dodgers to a 7–4 victory over San Diego. With a home run in both of the previous two games, González becomes the first player in major league history to hit five home runs in the first three games of the season. González also becomes the third Dodger to hit a home run in each of his team's first three games (Carl Furillo and Jimmy Wynn did it in 1955 and 1974, respectively), as well as the first National League player to begin a season with three 3-hit games since Orlando Cepeda in 1963.
- April 10 – At Yankee Stadium, the Boston Red Sox defeat the New York Yankees 6–5 in a 19-inning, 6 hour, 49 minute marathon, but not without squandering three one-run leads to extend the game. With the Yankees trailing 3–2 with two out in the ninth, Chase Headley sends the game into extra innings with a solo home run. David Ortiz homers in the top of the 16th to give the Red Sox the lead again, but Mark Teixeira, turning 35 years old as the clock strikes midnight, homers in the bottom half of the inning. In the 18th inning, the Red Sox take the lead again as Pablo Sandoval singles in Dustin Pedroia, only for the Yankees to again tie the game as Carlos Beltrán doubles home John Ryan Murphy. The Red Sox take the lead for a fourth time as Xander Bogaerts scores on a Mookie Betts fly ball, then turn a double play on a Garrett Jones ground ball to end the game at 2:13 AM. The game, which also features a 12th-inning power outage that delays the game for 16 minutes, is the longest by time in Red Sox history, and the second-longest for the Yankees, who defeated the Detroit Tigers in 22 innings in a June 24, 1962 game that lasted an even 7 hours. It is also the longest game in the Yankees-Red Sox rivalry since the Yankees defeated the Red Sox in the second game of an August 29, 1967 doubleheader that lasted 20 innings.
- April 12 – At Anaheim Stadium, Angels first baseman Albert Pujols hits his 522nd career home run off Kansas City Royals pitcher Yordano Ventura, breaking a tie with Ted Williams, Willie McCovey and Frank Thomas for 18th place on the MLB career list. The blast is not a factor in the decision, however, as the Royals prevail by a score of 9–2 and sweep the Angels. Pujols is now 12 home runs shy of tying Jimmie Foxx, who sits in 17th place on baseball's all-time home run list with 534.
- April 13 :
  - Boston Red Sox young leadoff hitter and center fielder Mookie Betts thrills his teammates and the capacity crowd at the home opener in Fenway Park and starts the Red Sox toward a 9–4 win over the Washington Nationals. Betts walks and adds a pair of stolen bases on one play in the second half of the first inning; he successfully steals second base, then continues on to third when no one is able to cover due to an infield shift. He scores the go-ahead run on a single by David Ortiz. Then Betts belts a three-run home run in the second inning and drives in another run in the third on a well-placed infield single. Additionally, Betts robs Bryce Harper of a home run in the first, leaping against the right-center field wall to save two runs. The 22-year-old Betts smashes his second homer of the season off Jordan Zimmermann. His first blast came off Philadelphia Phillies' Cole Hamels in the Opening Day at Citizens Bank Park.
  - Stephen Drew hits a pinch-hit grand slam off Baltimore Orioles pitcher Tommy Hunter in the seventh inning to propel the New Yankees to a 6–5 victory at Camden Yards. With his effort, Drew joins Don Baylor, Johnny Damon and Babe Ruth as the only players to hit a grand slam for both the Yankees and the Red Sox.
- April 15– In the ninth annual Civil Rights Game—played on Jackie Robinson Day—the Los Angeles Dodgers defeat the Seattle Mariners, 5–2, at Dodger Stadium in Los Angeles.
- April 17 – Mike Trout collects his first multi-home run game of the season, a two-run homer in the sixth inning and a three-run shot in the eighth, that carries the Anaheim Angels to a 6–3 victory over the Houston Astros at Minute Maid Park. At 23 years, 253 days of age, Trout becomes the youngest player ever to record 100 home runs and 100 stolen bases in major league history.
- April 22 – Boston Red Sox designated hitter David Ortiz continues his climb through the game's record book ranks in the 7–5 defeat to the Tampa Bay Rays at Tropicana Field. Ortiz delivers a fifth-inning solo home run off pitcher Nathan Karns, which moves him past Joe DiMaggio into 46th place on the MLB Career RBI List with 1,538, and also breaks a tie with Chipper Jones for 32nd place on the homer list with his 469th home run.
- April 23 – The New York Mets tie a franchise season record of eleven straight wins, and for the first time in its 54-year history win ten straight homestand games, becoming the seventh major league team since 1900 to win at least 10 straight homestand games.
- April 28 – For the second consecutive day, the scheduled game between the Baltimore Orioles and the Chicago White Sox at Camden Yards is postponed. The series opener between the two teams was postponed a day in advance, after protests in the area around Camden Yards turn violent. The teams will play the third game of the series in front of an empty stadium because the game will be closed to the public. The Orioles consulted with Major League Baseball and local and state officials about the best way to move forward in the midst of violent protests following the death of Freddie Gray, a 25-year-old man who suffered a spinal injury while in police custody earlier in the month. Baltimore was declared to be in a state of emergency and the National Guard was summoned to help restore peace. As a result, the Orioles will also play their three-game series against the Tampa Bay Rays, scheduled for May 1–3, at Tropicana Field, while serving as the home team. Additionally, the postponed games between the Orioles and the White Sox will be made up as part of a single-admission doubleheader on May 28 at Camden Yards.
- April 29 – Chris Davis hits a three-run homer in a six-run first inning and the Baltimore Orioles beat the Chicago White Sox, 8–2, in a fanless stadium. The gates at Camden Yards were locked because of concern for fan safety following recent rioting in Baltimore. As a result, the game is played before members of the media in the press box and 45,968 empty forest green seats. This is the first game held behind closed doors in the 145-year history of the major leagues.

=== May ===
- May 1 :
  - Major League Baseball emails all 30 teams to announce that, effective following this year's draft, players selected in the amateur draft will be available for trade beginning the day after the conclusion of the World Series. The change is a revamp of the previous iteration, which had prohibited clubs from trading players for one year after being drafted. With the new deadline in effect, things should be much easier for teams and players going forward.
  - At Fenway Park, Alex Rodríguez of the New York Yankees hits his 660th career home run to tie Willie Mays for fourth place on the all-time home run list. Pinch-hitting for Garrett Jones in the eighth inning, Rodríguez lines a 3-0 pitch by Junichi Tazawa over Fenway's Green Monster to break a tie and give the Yankees a 3–2 victory over the Boston Red Sox.
  - Due to safety concerns as a result of the Baltimore riots, the Orioles three-game series against the Rays is moved from Orioles Park at Camden Yards to Tropicana Field with the Orioles acting as the home team.
- May 3 :
  - The Milwaukee Brewers dismiss manager Ron Roenicke after a 7–18 start, ending his tenure with the team after four-plus seasons. Roenicke had been hired by the Brewers before the 2011 season and found immediate success. In his first year at the helm, Roenicke guided the Brewers to a franchise-best 96–66 record and first place in the National League Central. Milwaukee won its first-round NLDS matchup with the Arizona Diamondbacks but fell to the division-rival St. Louis Cardinals in the pennant series. That season earned Roenicke a second-place finish in the NL Manager of the Year voting, but that success proved hard to replicate. The Brewers slumped to an 83–79 record in 2012, while the 2013 edition dropped below .500 with a 74–88 mark. The Brewers then led the division from the 2014 season's first week all the way through the end of August, but the team went 9–17 over the final month of the year, going from one game up in the Central on August 30 to finishing the season eight games back of the eventual division champion Cardinals, and six games back in the NL Wild Card. Ultimately, Roenicke finished his time at Milwaukee with a 341–331 record.
  - The surprising Houston Astros won their 10th straight game, boosting the best record in the American League by beating the Seattle Mariners, 7–6, at Minute Maid Park. At 18–7, Houston set a team record for its best mark through the first 25 games. The Astros are coming off a 70–92 season, which followed three straight years of at least 106 losses. Not only do the Astros have the best 25–game start in franchise history, they tied for the fourth-best start in major league history, being surpassed only by the 19–6 record shared by the 1899 St. Louis Perfectos, the 1978 Oakland Athletics, and the 1993 Philadelphia Phillies.
- May 4 – Milwaukee Brewers general manager Doug Melvin announces Craig Counsell as the new manager of the team, less than 24 hours after dismissing Ron Roenicke. A Milwaukee area native, Counsell spent six seasons of his 16-year major league playing for the Brewers. Counsell also scored the winning run for the Florida Marlins in the 11th inning of Game 7 of the 1997 World Series, and was named MVP of the 2001 NLCS as a member of the eventual 2001 World champions Arizona Diamondbacks. Counsell had been Melvin's special assistant since 2012 and was among the candidates last offseason to succeed Joe Maddon as Tampa Bay Rays' manager.
- May 5 :
  - At Citi Field, Bartolo Colón of the New York Mets defeats the Baltimore Orioles, 3–2, to become the first pitcher to defeat the same opponent while pitching for seven different teams. He strikes out nine and walks none in 7 2/3 innings, having been pulled after having a shutout broken up by a Manny Machado home run. Colón had also defeated the Orioles while playing with the Cleveland Indians, Chicago White Sox, Los Angeles Angels of Anaheim, Boston Red Sox, New York Yankees and Oakland Athletics.
  - Carlos Pérez hits a walk-off home run at Angel Stadium in his first major league game, as the Anaheim Angels snap their four-game skid with a 5–4 victory over the Seattle Mariners. The 24-year-old rookie catcher from Venezuela, who also singled in his first major league at-bat, becomes only the fourth player to belt a game-ending home run in his big-league debut since 1900, joining countryman Miguel Cabrera (2003), Josh Bard (2002) and Billy Parker (1972). The Angels acquired Pérez from the Houston Astros in the offseason and promoted him while he was batting .361 for the Triple-A Salt Lake Bees.
- May 6:
  - At Nationals Park, Bryce Harper hits three home runs in the Washington Nationals' 7–5 victory over the Miami Marlins. The home runs, all off Tom Koehler, come in his first three trips to the plate: a solo shot in the second inning, with a runner on base in the third, and with the bases empty in the fifth. Harper becomes the fourth player in Nationals history to hit three homers in one game, joining Alfonso Soriano, Adam Dunn and Ryan Zimmerman in 2006, 2010 and 2013, respectively.
  - In the Minnesota Twins' 13–0 home victory over Oakland, outfielder Eddie Rosario becomes the twenty-ninth player in history to hit a home run on the first major league pitch he sees.
- May 7:
  - The Boston Red Sox announce that Juan Nieves is relieved of his duties as pitching coach, after presiding over a struggling pitching rotation that posted a 5.54 ERA through 28 starting appearances, the worst mark in the 15-team American League. The Red Sox starters have failed to complete the fifth inning in seven of 28 games and have combined to throw only 154 1/3 innings, the sixth-lowest total in the league. Additionally, the Red Sox sport a collective 4.86 ERA, the second highest in the major leagues (the Colorado Rockies have the highest at 5.38). Nieves joined the Red Sox prior to the 2013 season, and he helped lead the resurgence of starters Jon Lester (15–8), Clay Buchholz (11–1) and Félix Doubront (11–6) en route to the 2013 World Series championship. Overall, the staff posted a 3.79 ERA in 2013, the lowest mark for the club since 2002 (3.75 ERA), and also set a single-season franchise record with 1,294 strikeouts.
  - At Yankee Stadium, Alex Rodriguez of the New York Yankees overtakes Willie Mays for the sole possession of fourth place on the all-time home run list. In the third inning of the Yankees' 4–3 victory over the Baltimore Orioles, Rodriguez hits a Chris Tillman changeup for his 661st career home run. Rodriguez nearly homered in the first inning, but was robbed by right fielder Delmon Young, who made a leaping catch in front of the stands.
  - Top New York Mets prospect Noah Syndergaard pitches eight strong innings and falls a triple shy of hitting for the cycle, as Triple-A Las Vegas 51s win their 14th straight game in an 8–2 victory over the host Albuquerque Isotopes. In five games, Syndergaard improves to a 3–0 record with a 1.82 ERA and 34 strikeouts in 29 2/3 innings for Las Vegas. He eventually makes his major league debut with the Mets on May 12.
- May 8 – Bryce Harper slugs two more home runs and drives in five runs, as the Washington Nationals beat the visiting Atlanta Braves, 9–3. Harper again uses the long ball multiple times a game after hitting three home runs with five RBI against the Florida Marlins. According to the Elias Sports Bureau, Harper became the first player in Nationals/Expos franchise history to hit five home runs in two games. The last player to do it in the major leagues was Josh Reddick of the Oakland Athletics, who accomplished the feat on August 9–10, 2013. At age 22, Harper, is also the youngest player to hit five homers within two games. The previous mark was set by Mark McGwire at age 23.
- May 9 – Bryce Harper continues his torrid home run pace with a dramatic two-run, walk-off shot in the ninth inning to send the surging Washington Nationals to an 8–6 victory over the Atlanta Braves. Harper's home run is his sixth in three games, and the third walk-off of his career, while the Nationals collect their ninth victory in 11 games and improve to a 16–15 record to break the .500 mark for first time in this season.
- May 10 – This is the 10th year that Major League Baseball partners with Louisville Slugger to produce the special pink bats, which usually are auctioned off to raise money for breast cancer charities. Additionally, players also show their support by wearing the symbolic pink ribbon, as well as pink wrist bands, bracelets, cleats and necklaces. As a result, the annual Mother's Day pink celebration around the MLB ballparks bring about memorable moments for baseball fanatics and ballplayers, particularly for some pitchers.
  - The 41-year-old Bartolo Colón holds the Philadelphia Phillies to a pair of runs, before giving up a pair of hits to lead off the seventh inning and end his day in the New York Mets 7–4 victory at Citizens Bank Park. As he has done all season, Colón gives his team enough effort to win, becoming the first pitcher to reach six wins in 2015. Colón also extends his club record of games without issuing a walk to six straight and 40 1/3 innings, as he has walked only one batter in 46 1/3 innings of work. Colón, whose mother Adriana died last August, is the only starting pitcher not wearing cleats with pink laces or highlights in honor of Mother's Day. Nevertheless, he let his performance to do the tribute to his mom.
  - At Safeco Field, Félix Hernández of the Seattle Mariners records his 2,000th career strikeout after striking out Sam Fuld in the fifth inning of a 4–3 victory over the Oakland Athletics. Only Walter Johnson, Sam McDowell and Bert Blyleven, who were all 28 when they struck out 2,000, reached the milestone at a younger age than Hernández at 29 years, 32 days old. Hernāndez improves to 6–0 and ties with Bartolo Colón for the most wins in the season, while his eight strikeouts on May 4 against the Angeles Angels push him past the 1,988 strikeouts of Johan Santana to give him the most by a Venezuelan-born pitcher. Hernández was the fourth-youngest to reach 1,000 strikeouts on August 25, 2010.
  - New York Yankees pitcher Michael Pineda has the most notable achievement of his career, dominating the visiting Baltimore Orioles over seven innings with a career-high 16 strikeouts. Pineda strikes out the side in the second and fifth innings, and records at least two strikeouts in every inning he pitches. He is removed from the game after throwing 81 of his 111 pitches for strikes, and the Yankees beat the Orioles 6–2. Pineda's strikeouts tie the most by a Yankees right-hander, and leaves him two shy of tying the club record set in 1978 by the lefty Ron Guidry. The 16 strikeouts also matches the most any major league pitcher has had in a seven-inning outing.
  - Texas Rangers pitcher Wandy Rodríguez sets a club record by retiring 34 straight hitters over two games. The record comes against the visiting Tampa Bay Rays, as Rodriguez retires the first 15 hitters he faced. The Rangers prevail, beating the Rays 2–1, even though Rodríguez gets a no decision. The streak started on May 5 when Rodríguez retired the last 19 batters he faced in a 7–1 Rangers victory over the Houston Astros. Rodríguez was credited with the win in that game. The previous record was held by Kenny Rogers, who retired 28 in a row in 1994, including his perfect game against the California Angels.
- May 13 – At Progressive Field, Corey Kluber of the Cleveland Indians ties Bob Feller's 77-year franchise record by striking out 18 St. Louis Cardinals in the Indians' 2–0 victory, his first win of the season in eight starts. The reigning American League Cy Young Award winner, Kluber, 0-5 entering this game, also has a no-hitter broken up with two out in the seventh on a Jhonny Peralta single. This will be the only hit Kluber allows in eight innings; he is relieved by Cody Allen, who records his fifth save of the season. Feller had struck out 18 Detroit Tigers on October 2, 1938 in the first game of a doubleheader; however, the Tigers defeated the Indians 4–1.
- May 15 :
  - Adrián Beltré of the Texas Rangers hits his 400th career home run in the first inning of the Rangers' 8–3 loss to the visiting Cleveland Indians. The 36-year-old Beltre jumps ahead of Miguel Cabrera, Andrés Galarraga and Al Kaline at 399 homers, as he becomes the 52nd big leaguer to hit 400. In his 18th season, Beltré ranks fourth among active players behind Alex Rodríguez (663), Albert Pujols (526) and David Ortiz (470).
  - Houston Astros prospect Jon Singleton continues his powerful display at the plate with his third grand slam in five games, and the Triple-A Fresno Grizzlies roll to an 8–3 victory against the Albuquerque Isotopes at Isotopes Park. Two days before, Singleton capped a four-hit game with a slam, a two-run homer, and a franchise record of 10 RBI in the Fresno 17–6 win against the Isotopes. In his five-game stint, Singleton batted .381 (8-for-21) with five home runs and 23 RBI, while leading all of Minor League Baseball with 12 home runs and 40 RBI. Eight of his 12 home runs have come in his last 11 games, and he is 5-for-7 with three homers and 17 RBI with the bases loaded at this point in the 2015 season.
  - MLB and the independent Atlantic League of Professional Baseball (ALPB) sign a formal written agreement which explicates the rules that the ALPB would follow in selling its players' contracts to MLB clubs and their affiliates. This is a watershed moment for independent baseball because, although MLB clubs have routinely bought players from independent leagues, this marks the first time that MLB, which has enjoyed a U.S. Supreme Court-granted antitrust exemption since 1922, had made any formal agreement with or acknowledgment of an independent baseball league.
- May 16 – Miguel Cabrera of the Detroit Tigers hits his 400th career home run, a solo shot off St. Louis Cardinals pitcher Tyler Lyons in the first inning, as the Tigers go on to beat the Cardinals, 4–3, in 10 innings at Busch Stadium. Cabrera moves to 53rd place for most career home runs in MLB history. Cabrera, who passed Tigers legend Al Kaline, becomes the second player to join the club in as many days. Texas Rangers third baseman Adrián Beltré hit his 400th on May 15. The home run also moved Cabrera past Andrés Galarraga on the home run list, making him the all-time home run leader among MLB players born in Venezuela.
- May 17 :
  - Atlanta Braves pitcher Shelby Miller holds a no-hitter through 8 2/3 innings until Miami Marlins first baseman Justin Bour breaks up the no-hit bid with a sharp single up the middle. Dee Gordon follows with an infield single before Miller retires Martín Prado on a pop-up for the final out. Miller notches a 6–0 shutout over the Marlins at Marlins Park. Miller, who struck out four, improves to 5–1 in the season with a 1.33 ERA in eight starts. It is the third time in his career that he started and pitched the first five innings of a game without a hit. Miller also allowed a hit with two outs in the sixth inning in each of his two previous outings. The no-hitter would have been the Braves' first since Kent Mercker on April 8, 1994.
  - The Miami Marlins announce that manager Mike Redmond is relieved of his duties. Bench coach Rob Leary is also dismissed. The announcement comes after the Marlins were nearly no-hit in a 6–0 loss to the Atlanta Braves that completed a three-game sweep at Marlins Park. At this point, the Marlins have lost nine of their past 13 games and are fourth in the National League East with a 16–22 record. Marlins owner Jeffrey Loria, notorious for not being extremely patient with managers, fired Jeff Torborg after an identical record of 16–22 in 2003. His replacement Jack McKeon then led a turnaround that resulted in an improbable run to the 2003 World Series title. Along with the early-season firing of Torborg, Loria dismissed Fredi González in June 2010, and fired Joe Girardi and Ozzie Guillén after one season each. Redmond posted a 62–100 record in his first year as a major league manager with the Marlins in 2013, as the club improved to 77–85 in 2014, ending a streak of three consecutive last-place finishes in the NL East. Their 15-win improvement tied for the best in the NL by a 100-loss team since 1986. On the final day of last season, Redmond's contract was extended two years through 2017, while Guillén is in the final year of his four-year contract, which means the team will be paying three different managers in this season.
- May 18 – The Miami Marlins officially announce that general manager Dan Jennings will succeed Mike Redmond as the team's new manager for the remainder of the season. In other internal decision, Mike Goff will be the club's new bench coach, while VP/assistant GM Mike Berger will assume Jennings' former front office roles. Jennings has no dugout experience, but he is a respected baseball mind throughout the industry. At this point, the Marlins are still paying Jennings' GM predecessor, Larry Beinfest. They will also pay Redmond through the 2017 season and pay former manager Ozzie Guillén through the end of the current season. As a result, the move from GM to manager for Jennings will prevent the team from taking on a financial commitment to a third manager, though it is not directly clear how large a role that factor played in the decision. Owner Jeffrey Loria was not present for the press conference.
- May 19 – Ryan Zimmerman smashes a two-run, game-ending home run with two outs in the 10th inning, lifting the Washington Nationals to an 8–6 comeback victory over the New York Yankees at Nationals Park. Zimmerman hits his shot off Yankees closer Andrew Miller, who had not allowed a run in 18 1/3 innings this season. Zimmerman's 10th career walk-off homer ties him with eight other players for 10th on the all-time list, which is topped by Jim Thome at 13. Additionally, 5.3% (10 of 189) of his career home runs have been walk-offs, the highest percent of HRs via walk-off among 819 players in MLB history with at least 100 career HRs, according to the Elias Sports Bureau.
- May 23 – The Chicago White Sox retire Paul Konerko's #14 in a pre-game ceremony at U.S. Cellular Field. Konerko becomes the 11th player to have his number retired by the White Sox, joining Nellie Fox (2), Harold Baines (3), Luke Appling (4), Minnie Miñoso (9), Luis Aparicio (11), Ted Lyons (16), Billy Pierce (19), Frank Thomas (35), Jackie Robinson (whose #42 is retired throughout all of Major League Baseball) and Carlton Fisk (72).
- May 27 – At Yankee Stadium, Alex Rodriguez of the New York Yankees breaks Lou Gehrig's American League record for most runs batted in. In the third inning of the Yankees' 4–2 victory over the Kansas City Royals, he hits a three-run home run off Chris Young for 1995 career RBIs, all in the American League and two more than Gehrig's total (all with the Yankees), according to the Elias Sports Bureau.
- May 28 – The 22-year-old Eduardo Rodríguez earns the win in his much-anticipated major league debut, tossing 7 2/3 shutout innings in the Boston Red Sox's 5–1 victory over the Texas Rangers at Globe Life Park. Rodríguez allows just three hits and walks two batters, while striking out seven on 105 pitches, 68 of them for strikes. Already the youngest Red Sox pitcher to make his major league debut on the road since 21-year-old Roger Clemens faced the Cleveland Indians in 1984, Rodríguez also becomes the youngest Red Sox starter to win in his major league debut on the road since 1967, when 21-year-old Billy Rohr hurled a one-hit shutout against the New York Yankees.

=== June ===
- June 3 – In a six-player transaction, the Seattle Mariners acquire outfielder Mark Trumbo and pitcher Vidal Nuño from the Arizona Diamondbacks in exchange for catcher Welington Castillo, pitcher Dominic Leone, and minor league prospects Gabby Guerrero and Jack Reinheimer. Trumbo adds power to a Mariners lineup that consists of Nelson Cruz, Robinson Canó and Kyle Seager, while the D–Backs need a catcher after Tuffy Gosewisch suffered an ACL injury. The trade also opened space for Yasmany Tomas in the crowded outfield lineup.
- June 5 :
  - The 29-year-old, ambidextrous pitcher Pat Venditte makes his major league debut with the Oakland Athletics. Venditte had spent eight seasons in the minor leagues before getting his first call to the majors. The Athletics lose to the Boston Red Sox 2–4 at Fenway Park, even though the switch-pitcher was not a factor in the decision. The pitcher must declare which hand he will be throwing with and must do that to the batter for the whole at bat. This matters most for switch hitters. As a result, Venditte pitches a nearly perfect 7th inning, retiring lefty Brock Holt with his left arm, then switching to his right to face righties Hanley Ramírez and Mike Napoli. He allows a single to Ramírez, but Napoli hits a double play to end the inning. In the 8th, Venditte retires Xander Bogaerts on a ground ball and strikes out Mookie Betts. He then declares that he will pitch right-handed against switch-hitter Blake Swihart, so Swihart elects to bat left-handed. Swihart strikes out swinging. Since the New York Yankees selected Venditte in the 20th round of the 2008 MLB draft, he became one of the more intriguing stories in the minor leagues. A switch-thrower since age three, Venditte uses a special glove that can be used on either hand and can be easily switched from hitter to hitter. After spending seven seasons in the Yankees system, Venditte signed with the Athletics as a minor league free agent during the postseason. Venditte became the second pitcher in MLB's modern era since Greg A. Harris with the Montreal Expos on September 28, 1995, to throw with both arms in the same game.
  - At Yankee Stadium, Alex Rodriguez moves up on two all-time career lists. In the fifth inning of the Yankees' 8–7 victory over the Los Angeles Angels of Anaheim, his single scores Brett Gardner and gives Rodriguez 1,997 career runs batted in, passing Barry Bonds for third place on the all-time list; he now trails Babe Ruth and Hank Aaron. Two innings later, Rodriguez scores on a Chris Young single for his 1,950th career run scored, passing Stan Musial for eighth place. Rodriguez also collects four hits for the first time since 2011 and moves to within nine of 3,000 for his career.
- June 8 – Los Angeles Angels slugger Albert Pujols hits his 535th career home run off New York Yankees pitcher CC Sabathia in the Angels' 6–2 defeat at Yankee Stadium, moving him past Jimmie Foxx into 17th place on the all-time home run list. Pujols is now one home run shy of tying Mickey Mantle in 16th place.
- June 9:
  - At Citi Field, the 27-year-old rookie Chris Heston of the San Francisco Giants no-hits the New York Mets, 5–0. Striking out 11 and allowing only three base runners, all on hit by pitches, Heston becomes the first rookie to pitch a no-hitter since Clay Buchholz in 2007. He strikes out the side in the ninth inning, which has not happened since Sandy Koufax's perfect game in 1965. With the no-hitter, the Giants become only the second team in major league history to record a no-hitter in four consecutive seasons, with Matt Cain pitching a perfect game in 2012 and Tim Lincecum pitching no-hitters in both 2013 and 2014. The Los Angeles Dodgers had recorded a no-hitter for four consecutive years, from 1962–1965; Sandy Koufax had pitched all four of those no-hitters, the perfect game being the last of them. The no-hitter is also the first against the Mets in a Met home game since Bob Moose no-hit them at Shea Stadium in 1969; they were also on the losing end of Jim Bunning's perfect game at Shea in 1964.
  - At Great American Ball Park, Joey Votto hits three home runs in the Cincinnati Reds' 11–2 victory over the Philadelphia Phillies. Having also hit three home runs against the Chicago Cubs on May 7, 2008 and the Washington Nationals on May 13, 2012, Votto joins Johnny Bench as the only players with three three-home run games in a Cincinnati Reds uniform.
- June 11 – Albert Pujols clubs his 537th career home run off Tampa Bay Rays pitcher Preston Guilmet to reach 16th place on the all-time home run list. Pujols' milestone home run, which comes in the ninth inning, completes the Anaheim Angels' 6–2 victory over the Rays at Tropicana Field. Since the start of this season, Pujols has surpassed Ted Williams, Willie McCovey, Frank Thomas, Jimmie Foxx and Mickey Mantle. Pujols is now 11 home runs short of tying Mike Schmidt for 15th place on MLB's career home run list.
- June 15 – The San Diego Padres announce that Bud Black has been relieved of his managerial duties. Black, who joined the Padres as their manager in 2007, posted a 649–713 record in 1,362 games for San Diego but never reached the postseason. Black was awarded National League Manager of the Year in 2010 after leading the modest Padres to a 90–72 season, the team's best record during his eight-plus years in San Diego. The Padres organization also announces that bench coach Dave Roberts will take over immediately until a new manager is appointed.
- June 16:
  - San Diego Padres general manager A. J. Preller announces that Pat Murphy will be the interim manager of the team for the remaining of the season. Murphy stepped into the job after Bud Black was dismissed in the middle of his ninth season. Murphy, who is in his sixth year with the Padres organization, managed their Triple-A El Paso Chihuahuas to a 180–172 record over the past three seasons. Murphy also previously coached at Notre Dame (1988–1994) and Arizona State (1995–2009), collecting a college career coaching record of 1,000-457-4.
  - At Oriole Park at Camden Yards, the Baltimore Orioles hit eight home runs in their 19–3 drubbing of the Philadelphia Phillies. The home runs are the most in one game for the Orioles since the St. Louis Browns franchise moved to Baltimore in the 1954 season. The Orioles had hit seven home runs three times previously, most recently against the Toronto Blue Jays on September 26, 2012. With the loss, the Phillies complete an 0-8 road trip, their first winless road trip of at least eight games since 1883, the franchise's inaugural season.
  - Valuable utility man Brock Holt becomes the first Boston Red Sox player in almost 19 years to hit for the cycle. Holt goes 4-for-5 with two RBI and two runs scored, helping the Red Sox snap their seven-game losing streak in a 9–4 victory against the Atlanta Braves in interleague play at Fenway Park. Holt, who is batting leadoff and playing at second base in the absence of injured Dustin Pedroia, doubles in the first inning, singles in the fifth, crushes a solo home run in the seventh, and finishes off the cycle with an RBI triple in the eighth. The last Red Sox player to accomplish the feat was John Valentin on June 16, 1996. Holt becomes one of 14 players this season to accumulate 10 total bases in a single game and is also the first player to hit for the cycle against the Braves since Keith Hernandez of the New York Mets on July 4, 1985. Holt had already entered the Red Sox record book last season by becoming the first Boston player to start games at seven different positions.
- June 19 – At Yankee Stadium, Alex Rodriguez of the New York Yankees becomes the 29th member of the 3,000 hit club. His milestone hit is an opposite-field home run off Justin Verlander in the first inning of Yankees' 7–2 victory over the Detroit Tigers. Rodriguez becomes the third player to hit a home run for his 3,000th career hit, joining Wade Boggs in 1999 and Derek Jeter in 2011. He also becomes the fifth player with 3,000 career hits and 500 career home runs, joining Hank Aaron, Willie Mays, Eddie Murray and Rafael Palmeiro.
- June 20 – At Nationals Park, Max Scherzer of the Washington Nationals no-hits the Pittsburgh Pirates 6–0. After retiring the first 26 batters, he comes to within one strike of a perfect game, only to hit the 27th batter, José Tábata. Scherzer, who records 10 strikeouts, completes the no-hitter by retiring Josh Harrison on a fly ball. In his previous start, he took a perfect game into the seventh at Milwaukee Brewers and finished with a one-hitter and 16 strikeouts. The lone hit was a leadoff single by Carlos Gómez. Scherzer also becomes the second pitcher to throw a no-hitter after having a perfect game bid broken up with two out in the ninth, joining Chicago Cubs' Milt Pappas against the San Diego Padres on September 2, 1972. Pappas had his bid broken up by a walk to the 27th hitter, Larry Stahl. The two consecutive outings by Scherzer are perhaps the best consecutive starts in major league history since Johnny Vander Meer pitched back-to-back no-hitters for the Cincinnati Reds in 1938. The deepest a pitcher took a no-hitter after throwing one was Nolan Ryan in 1973, when he allowed a hit to the Baltimore Orioles with no outs in the eighth inning.
- June 21 – The Boston Red Sox crush the Kansas City Royals, 13–2, at Kauffman Stadium. David Ortiz adds another milestone to his résumé, as the solo home run he belts to right field off Chris Young in the fourth inning gives the Sox a 2–0 lead. Officials measure the blast at 456 feet, but it is the 476th home run of his career, putting Ortiz in 29th place on MLB's career home run list. He had been tied with Hall-of-Famers Stan Musial and Willie Stargell. Ortiz now needs 18 homers to pass Lou Gehrig and Fred McGriff and move into 27th place.
- June 24 – At TD Ameritrade Park in Omaha, Nebraska, the Virginia Cavaliers defeat the defending champion Vanderbilt Commodores in the deciding game of a best-of-three championship series to win their first-ever College World Series. After losing the first game of this best-of-three series 5–1, the Cavaliers shut out the Commodores 3–0, then win the deciding game 4–2. The Commodores had defeated the Cavaliers two games to one in the best-of-three final to win the 2014 College World Series. The Cavaliers finish the season 44–24; the victory total is the fewest by a College World Series champion since Southern Cal won 43 games in winning the 1968 College World Series. Virginia's title also ends the Atlantic Coast Conference's 60-year drought of not having won a College World Series title. Wake Forest had won the conference's only other College World Series title, doing so in 1955.
- June 25 – At Nationals Park, the Washington Nationals' starting pitchers set a franchise record for the most consecutive innings without allowing a run, with Doug Fister pitching seven scoreless innings in a 7–0 victory over the Atlanta Braves, while giving the Nationals starters 41 1/3 consecutive scoreless innings. The last run scored against a Washington starter was off Joe Ross on June 19 in the second inning of the Nats' 4–1 victory over the Pittsburgh Pirates. Ross then pitched 5 1/3 shutout innings before being relieved. This game followed with a no-hitter pitched by Max Scherzer and 20 consecutive zeros by Gio González (7), Stephen Strasburg (5), Jordan Zimmermann (8), and finally, Fister. The franchise's previous scoreless inning streak of 39 1/3 innings was held by the 1981 Montreal Expos.
- June 26:
  - Ryne Sandberg resigns as manager of the Philadelphia Phillies. Having replaced the dismissed Charlie Manuel late in the 2013 season, Sandberg had managed the Phillies to a 119–159 record in less than two seasons. Pete Mackanin, a former Phillies player, will replace Sandberg as interim manager. Mackanin previously had served as Manuel's bench coach from 2009–2012. Mackanin also had two previous stints as an interim manager, in 2005 with the Pittsburgh Pirates, as well as for the Cincinnati Reds in 2007.
  - Later that evening, the Philadelphia Phillies are held without a baserunner through five and a third innings by Washington Nationals hurler Max Scherzer. A double by Phillies batsman Freddy Galvis with one out in the sixth inning represents the first hit allowed by Scherzer in a span of fifty four batters, having tossed an otherwise perfect one-hitter on June 14 against the Milwaukee Brewers, and a no-hitter six days later against the Pittsburgh Pirates. Scherzer comes up short of matching Johnny Vander Meer, who threw two straight no-hitters for the Cincinnati Reds on June 11 and 15 of 1938 against the Boston Bees and the Brooklyn Dodgers, respectively. It is the third consecutive start in which Scherzer has taken a perfect game through at least five innings. With his squad leading 5–2, Scherzer is pulled after eight innings of work and is ultimately credited with his 100th career win.
  - At the Rogers Centre, Prince Fielder hits his 300th career home run in the first inning of the Texas Rangers' 12–2 loss to the Toronto Blue Jays. With his father Cecil having hit 319 career home runs, the Fielders become the second father-and-son duo to hit 300 career home runs each, joining Barry Bonds and his father Bobby, who hit 762 and 332 home runs respectively.
  - Milwaukee Brewers' Kyle Lohse becomes just the 14th pitcher in major league history to collect at least one win over all current clubs, as the Brewers beat the Minnesota Twins 10–4 at Miller Park. Lohse, who started his career with the Twins in 2001, joins A. J. Burnett and Dan Haren as one of three active pitchers in a fraternity that began with Al Leiter in 2002, following the establishment of MLB's 29th and 30th teams beginning play for the 1998 season. The other eight pitchers to have defeated all 30 current teams include in alphabetical order Kevin Brown, Randy Johnson, Derek Lowe, Jamie Moyer, Terry Mulholland, Vicente Padilla, Curt Schilling, Javier Vázquez, Woody Williams and Barry Zito.
- June 29 – The Philadelphia Phillies announce the hiring of Andy MacPhail to head the team's baseball operations department. In 1986, at 33, MacPhail became the youngest general manager in major league history when he served in that role for the Minnesota Twins. The next year, he became the youngest GM to win a World Series title. He also has worked with the Chicago Cubs as their GM, president and CEO in different stints, and later served as president of baseball operations for the Baltimore Orioles. MacPhail will serve as a special assistant to interim president Pat Gillick for the remainder of the season, before assuming the role of president of the club following Gillick's retirement shortly after the season ends.
- June 30 – At Busch Stadium, Chris Sale of the Chicago White Sox ties Pedro Martínez's 16-year record of eight consecutive games of 10 or more strikeouts. Sale strikes out 12 in eight innings as the White Sox defeat the St. Louis Cardinals 2–1 on Tyler Flowers' home run in the 11th inning. Martínez had set the record in 1999, beginning on August 19 and ending on September 27.

=== July ===
- July 1 – In defeating the Tampa Bay Rays 8–1 at Tropicana Field, Cleveland Indians pitcher Carlos Carrasco has a no-hitter broken up with two out in the ninth inning—and one strike to go. The first two batters he faces in the ninth reach base: former teammate Asdrúbal Cabrera on a walk, and Brandon Guyer on a hit by pitch. After Grady Sizemore hits into a force play to retire Guyer, Kevin Kiermaier strikes out for the second out. Carrasco then gets two strikes on Joey Butler before Butler lines the ball inches over second baseman Jason Kipnis to score Cabrera. Austin Adams then relieves Carrasco and gets the final out. Butler had also broken up Carrasco's bid for a perfect game in the seventh by drawing a base on balls after Carrasco, who recorded 13 strikeouts, had retired the first 19 Rays batters. The no-hitter would have been the first by an Indians pitcher since Len Barker's perfect game on May 15, 1981.
- July 5 – Gerrit Cole allows three runs and five hits in eight innings, retiring 16 straight Cleveland Indians at one point, while the Pittsburgh Pirates put up a five-run rally in the 5th inning, getting Cole his MLB-leading 12th win. Additionally, Cole becomes the fifth pitcher in Pirates history to notch a dozen wins before the All-Star break. The others are Ken Brett (1974), Dock Ellis (1971), ElRoy Face (1969) and Rip Sewell (1943).
- July 8 – The Atlantic League of Professional Baseball debuts Rawlings baseballs with red and blue seams in its All-Star Game. Such balls have been virtually unused in the sport since the American League swapped the blue in their seams for red in 1934.
- July 12 – At Citi Field, Kirk Nieuwenhuis becomes the 10th New York Mets player to hit three home runs in one game, as well as the first to do so in a home game. In the Mets' 5–3 victory over the Arizona Diamondbacks, Nieuwenhuis hits the first two, a solo shot in the second and a two-run shot in the third, off D-backs starter Rubby De La Rosa. The third home run come with the bases empty off reliever Randall Delgado. Ike Davis had been the last Met before Nieuwenhuis to hit three home runs in one game, on July 28, 2012.
- July 14 – The American League defeats the National League, 6–3, in the 86th All-Star Game played at Great American Ball Park. Mike Trout of the Los Angeles Angels of Anaheim hits a home run off Los Angeles Dodgers pitcher Zack Greinke leading off the game; he is the first player to do so in an All-Star Game since Joe Morgan in 1977. The home run completes an All-Star hitting cycle for Trout, who had hit a single in 2012, a double in 2013 and a triple in 2014, all coming in consecutive style, all in his first at bats in the four games. Trout earned the game's Most Valuable Player Award honors and, as the MVP in the 2014 game, he becomes the first player to win the award in consecutive games, as well as the fifth player to win the award twice, joining Willie Mays, Steve Garvey, Gary Carter and Cal Ripken Jr.
- July 20 – History was made in Canada, as the first ever International Women's Baseball game was played as part of the 2015 Pan American Games. (See Main article)
- July 21:
  - At Citizens Bank Park, the Tampa Bay Rays defeat the Philadelphia Phillies, 1–0, as starter Nathan Karns hits a third-inning home run off pitching prospect Aaron Nola, who was making his major league debut. Karns becomes the sixth American League pitcher, and the first in the designated hitter era, to hit a home run in a 1–0 game. Milt Pappas had been the last American League pitcher to do it on April 18, 1962.
  - At Coors Field, Shin-Soo Choo hits for the cycle in the Texas Rangers' 9–0 victory over the Colorado Rockies. Choo begins the cycle with a double in the second inning, followed by a home run in the fourth and a single in the fifth. Then in the ninth, he lines a ball over center fielder Charlie Blackmon's head for the triple to complete the feat. A native of Busan, South Korea, Choo becomes the first Asian to hit for the cycle.
- July 25 – At Wrigley Field, Cole Hamels of the Philadelphia Phillies no-hits the Chicago Cubs 5–0. Hamels strikes out 13 and allows only two base runners, both walks to Dexter Fowler. He nearly loses the no-hitter on the final batter of the game as center fielder Odubel Herrera loses his footing while running down Kris Bryant's fly ball. Nevertheless, Herrera keeps his concentration and catches the ball for the final out. The no-hitter is the first to be pitched against the Chicago Cubs since Sandy Koufax's perfect game on September 9, 1965. The Cubs' span of 7,920 games is the longest of all major league teams since a no-hitter was last pitched against them. It is also the first no-hitter to be pitched at Wrigley Field since the Cubs' Milt Pappas no-hit the San Diego Padres on September 2, 1972. The starting pitcher in the Phillies' combined no-hitter on September 1, 2014, Hamels also becomes the fifth pitcher to also throw in a combined no-hitter, joining Vida Blue, Mike Witt, Kent Mercker and Kevin Millwood.
- July 27 – At Globe Life Park in Arlington, Alex Rodriguez celebrates his 40th birthday by hitting a home run in the New York Yankees' 6–2 victory over the Texas Rangers. The home run comes in the sixth inning off Matt Harrison and makes Rodriguez, whose first three major league home runs came in 1995 before his 20th birthday, the fourth player to hit home runs before turning 20 years old and after turning 40, joining Ty Cobb, Rusty Staub and Gary Sheffield.
- July 29 – During the New York Mets' game with the San Diego Padres at Citi Field, rumors spread that Wilmer Flores had been traded to the Milwaukee Brewers along with pitcher Zack Wheeler for Carlos Gómez. Despite the rumors, Flores remains in the game, and is visibly emotional when he returns to the field. Following the game, Mets general manager Sandy Alderson tells the media that no trade has occurred, and that "social media got ahead of the facts." It is later reported that the trade deal had fallen through. Two days later, Flores would hit his first career walk-off home run against Washington Nationals pitcher Felipe Rivero.

=== August ===
- August 3 – Mike Hessman of the Toledo Mud Hens belted his 433rd career home run, a go-ahead grand slam to break the minor league all-time home run record, and before Toledo eventually fell to the Lehigh Valley IronPigs in 11 innings, 10–8, in Triple-A International League action. In the seventh inning, Hessman took a 2-0 offering from pitcher Dustin McGowan for a no-doubt shot over the left-center field wall, clearing the bases and erasing a 79-year-old record held by Buzz Arlett. Previously, Hessman had become the home run champion in the International League in June 2014 with his 259th homer on the circuit (now at 289), breaking Ollie Carnegie's 69-year-old record. Outside of his minor league success, Hessman hit 14 homers in 109 major league games for the Atlanta Braves, Detroit Tigers and Mets, and six more in 2011 for the Orix Buffaloes in Japan. His next step was catching North American minor league home run leader Héctor Espino, who is credited with hitting 484 homers in Mexican baseball. Nelson Barrera (479), Andrés Mora (444) and Álex Ortiz (434) also are ahead of Hessman on that list.
- August 8 – Justin Smoak lined Toronto Blue Jays' first-ever grand slam at either Yankee Stadium, as the Blue Jays beat the New York Yankees, 6–0, for their seventh win in a row. Troy Tulowitzki also homered, and David Price allowed three hits and stroke out seven in seven shutout innings, while the Blue Jays closed within 2½ games of the AL East-leading Yankees. The next day Toronto swept the Yankees in a series of at least three games for the first time since May 2003.
- August 11 – For the first time in major league history, all 15 home teams win on the same day. The Seattle Mariners give the home teams the perfect record by defeating the Baltimore Orioles 6–5 in 10 innings at Safeco Field. According to the Elias Sports Bureau, the previous best performance by home teams had been 12–0 on May 23, 1914, which included four games in the Federal League, then considered one of the three major leagues. The best performance by home teams since then had been 11–0 on September 16, 1989.
- August 12 – At Safeco Field, Hisashi Iwakuma of the Seattle Mariners no-hits the Baltimore Orioles 3–0. Striking out seven batters and walking three, he becomes the second Japanese-born pitcher, after Hideo Nomo, to pitch a major league no-hitter Nomo previously pitched two – against the Colorado Rockies on September 17, 1996 while with the Los Angeles Dodgers, and against the Orioles on April 4, 2001 while with the Boston Red Sox. The Iwakuma no-hitter is the fifth in Seattle Mariners history and also the American League's first since that of another Mariners pitcher, Félix Hernández, who hurled the most recent perfect game in Major League Baseball against the Tampa Bay Rays on August 15, 2012. The twelve no-hitters in between had all been in the National League, including a combined no-hitter on September 1, 2014.
- August 14 – At Coors Field, Matt Kemp becomes the first San Diego Padre to hit for the cycle in the 7,444th game in the franchise's history. In the Padres' 9–5 victory over the Colorado Rockies, Kemp hits a home run in the first inning, followed by a single in the third and a double in the 7th. He completes the cycle by tripling in the ninth inning. Entering this game, the Padres also had been the only major league team without a cycle to its credit.
- August 15 – Jackie Bradley Jr. hit two home runs and three doubles to drive in seven runs and score five, as the Boston Red Sox battered Félix Hernández and the Seattle Mariners 22–10 at Fenway Park, while collecting 26 hits in the highest-scoring game ever against the Mariners' 39-year history. The night before, Boston delivered 21 hits and crushed Seattle, 15–1. As a result, Boston became the first major league club to get at least 15 runs and 21 hits in consecutive games since the Red Sox did it in 1950. Besides, Bradley Jr. set a Red Sox team-record with five extra-base hits in a single game, and also became the second big leaguer ever to collect five extra-base hits at the age of 25 or younger, joining Larry Twitchell, who did it on August 15, 1889.
- August 16 – Milwaukee Brewers prospect David Denson publicly announced he is gay, according to an interview published by the Milwaukee Journal Sentinel. The news made Denson the first active player affiliated with a major league organization to come out publicly. Billy Bean, a former big leaguer who publicly came out after his career ended and currently serves as Major League Baseball's first Ambassador for Inclusion, helped Denson throughout the process of coming out. The 20-year-old first baseman, who plays for the Rookie-level Helena Brewers, is rated as the No. 27 prospect in the Brewers minor league system by MLB.com, and also earned Top Star honors at the Northwest/Pioneer League All-Star Game this month.
- August 18 – The Boston Red Sox hired Dave Dombrowski to be their president of all baseball operations, matters effective immediately. Dombrowski started his executive career with the Chicago White Sox in 1978 and served as general manager for the Montreal Expos in 1988 at the age of 31, becoming the youngest general manager in Major League Basaball at the time. He later joined the Florida Marlins in 1992, helping them win a World Series championship in 1997, and then took the Detroit Tigers from consistent losers when he was hired in 2001 to consistent winners, leading them to World Series appearances in 2006 and 2012. Dombrowski also has a close relationship with John Henry, who owned the Marlins in the late 1990s until he bought the Red Sox in 2002. The announcement also revealed that Ben Cherington declined to continue in his role as Red Sox GM, but agreed to assist Dombrowski during the transition. Bringing Dombrowski on board, the Red Sox adopted the same management structure employed by a number of other teams who have both a president and GM of baseball operations, including the Arizona Diamondbacks, Chicago Cubs, Chicago White Sox, Los Angeles Dodgers and Philadelphia Phillies.
- August 21 – At Minute Maid Park, Mike Fiers of the Houston Astros no-hits the Los Angeles Dodgers 3–0. Throwing 134 pitches in pitching his first complete game in the majors, he strikes out 10 and walks three in his third start for the Astros since being traded from the Milwaukee Brewers on July 30. The no-hitter also foils Chase Utley's Dodger debut; Utley, who had been traded two days earlier from the Philadelphia Phillies, for whom he had played since 2003, goes 0-for-4. The no-hitter is the Astros' first since the combined six-pitcher no-hitter against the New York Yankees on June 11, 2003, and their first complete game no-hitter since Darryl Kile on September 8, 1993.
- August 26 – For the second time in his career, Justin Verlander of the Detroit Tigers has his bid for a third career no-hitter broken up in the ninth. In the Tigers' 5–0 victory over the Los Angeles Angels of Anaheim at Comerica Park, Chris Iannetta, who entered the game batting .186, breaks up the bid by lining a doubleinches inside the third base line; the hit is the only one Verlander will allow. Verlander, who no-hit the Milwaukee Brewers on June 12, 2007 and the Toronto Blue Jays on May 7, 2011, was bidding to become the sixth pitcher to throw three or more no-hitters, joining Larry Corcoran (three in the 1880s), Cy Young (three), Bob Feller (three), Sandy Koufax (four) and Nolan Ryan (seven). Besides, Verlander also had a no-hitter broken up in the ninth against the Pittsburgh Pirates on May 18, 2012.
- August 28 – The Seattle Mariners announced that general manager Jack Zduriencik had been relieved of his duties, effective immediately. Zduriencik was hired as Seattle's GM in October 2008 after a decade with the Milwaukee Brewers, where he was regarded as a top talent evaluator. Over his seven seasons in charge of baseball operations in Seattle, the Mariners finished with a winning record just twice and never qualified for the postseason. Assistant GM Jeff Kingston will assume Zduriencik's responsibilities on an interim basis through the end of the season, according to the team.
- August 30 :
  - David Ortiz hit his 494th career home run in the 5–4 loss to the New York Mets at Citi Field. That moves Ortiz into sole possession of 27th place on the all-time home run list, ahead of Lou Gehrig and Fred McGriff at 493. Ortiz is now 10 home runs short of tying Eddie Murray 26th place on MLB's career home run list.
  - At Dodger Stadium, Jake Arrieta of the Chicago Cubs no-hits the Los Angeles Dodgers 2–0. He strikes out a season-high 12 batters, including all three he faces in both the first and ninth innings, in pitching the Cubs' 14th no-hitter and their first since Carlos Zambrano in 2008. Sandy Koufax had been the last pitcher to complete a no-hitter by striking out all three batters he faced in the ninth inning, doing so in his perfect game against the Cubs on September 9, 1965—a game also played in Dodger Stadium. Arrieta receives the benefit of a close call from the official scorer on Kiké Hernández's third-inning ground ball, which Cub second baseman Starlin Castro tries to play on a short hop; the ball bounces off Castro and rolls away for what the official scorer rules an error. The Dodgers, no-hit by Mike Fiers of the Houston Astros nine days earlier, become the first team to have two no-hitters pitched against it in one month since the Cincinnati Reds in June, 1971. The nine-day span is also the shortest between no-hitters pitched against a team since the 1923 Philadelphia Athletics were no-hit twice in three days. The no-hitter is the third to be pitched against the Dodgers at Dodger Stadium; they had also been on the losing end of Dennis Martínez's perfect game in 1991, and Kent Mercker's no-hitter 1994.

=== September ===
- September 3 – The Washington Nationals crushed the Atlanta Braves, 15–1, at Nationals Park. Bryce Harper made history, as he scored four runs for the Nationals, even though he statistically did not have an at-bat but drew a walk in each of his four plate appearances. Only three other big leaguers have ever scored four runs and received four walks in a game without taking a turn at-bat: Larry Doby (1951), Joe Morgan (1973) and Rickey Henderson (1989). Besides, Harper worked a bases loaded walk and was credited with a run batted in, which is the first time in modern history that a hitter has drawn at least four walks, scored four times, and drove in a run without having a hit in each of his turns at-bat.
- September 4 – At Wrigley Field, Addison Russell of the Chicago Cubs became the first position player in National League history to hit two home runs in the same game while batting ninth in the order. The home runs came in the second and fourth innings, both off pitcher Zack Godley, in the Cubs' 14–5 victory over the Arizona Diamondbacks. At 21 years, 224 days old, Russell also became the youngest Cubs player to hit two home runs in the same game since Danny Murphy did so at 19 years, 35 days old on September 27, 1961.
- September 10 – The Philadelphia Phillies announced that they would not extend the contract of general manager Rubén Amaro Jr. Amaro, 50, rose from team batboy between 1980 and 1983 to playing for the Phillies during five seasons spanning 1992–1998. Amaro rejoined the Phillies in the 2008 offseason, when he succeeded GM Pat Gillick. The Phillies won the 2009 National League pennant and made a World Series run in Amaro's first full year as GM, ultimately coming up short to the New York Yankees, and went on to reach the postseason in the 2010 and 2011 campaigns as well. However, a number of transactions made by Amaro that were aimed at keeping the Phillies in contention served, instead, to only deplete its minor league system while failing to pay significant on-field dividends.
- September 12 – David Ortiz connected his career 500th home run against Tampa Bay Rays pitcher Matt Moore in the fifth inning, sending a 2-and-2 curveball to right-center field at Tropicana Field. It was the second home run of the game for Ortiz, the 50th time he has hit multiple home runs in a game. Ortiz also has hit 443 of his home runs as a designated hitter, a major league record at that position. In addition, he now ranks 27th in major league history and 12th in American League history in home runs, as well as 11th among lefthanded batters and fourth among players from the Dominican Republic. His next milestone will be moving up the Boston Red Sox all-time list, which is led by Ted Williams with 521 home runs followed by Carl Yastrzemski with 452. At the time, Ortiz has 442.
- September 15 – Stephen Strasburg gave up one hit and tied a career best with 14 strikeouts in eight dominant innings, as the Washington Nationals beat the Philadelphia Phillies, 4–0, at Citizens Bank Park. Bryce Harper hit two home runs and drove in all the runs, while collecting his 10th career multihomer game and fifth this season. The 14 strikeouts matched Strasburg's career high, which came in his first career start against the Pittsburgh Pirates on June 8, 2010, joining Bill Stoneman as the only Nationals/Expos franchise pitchers to strike out at least 14 hitters twice.
- September 16 – Jake Peavy led the San Francisco Giants to a 5–3 victory over the Cincinnati Reds at AT&T Park, posting a solid outing and helping himself with the bat. The veteran right hander allowed two runs on seven hits over six-plus innings, striking out eight batters and walking just one. Peavy also blasted his career third home run off Collin Balester in the fourth inning, to become the fifth Giants pitcher this season to hit a home run, matching a major league record. Not until he got past second base and saw an umpire signal did Peavy know he had cleared the fence. Peavy is legally blind and with contacts can only get to 20-40 vision. The Giants starting rotation has hit nine homers, one shy of the single-season franchise record set in 1924 and matched in 1934. Madison Bumgarner has collected five, and Mike Leake, Tim Hudson, Ryan Vogelsong and Peavy have one apiece.
- September 20 – Kansas City Royals DH Kendrys Morales enjoyed what might have been the best offensive game of his major league career, hitting three solo home runs in a 10–3 win over the Detroit Tigers at Comerica Park. Morales also hit a triple, scored five runs, and set a team record with 15 total bases. Kris Medlen allowed three unearned runs and five hits in five innings of work and was credited with the win, while Danny Duffy pitched four shutout innings for his first career save.
- September 22:
  - The Philadelphia Phillies named Pete Mackanin as its permanent manager signing him through the 2016 season with a club option for 2017. Mackanin, who has coached for the Phillies for six of the past seven seasons, was named interim manager of the Phillies on June 26 following the resignation of Ryne Sandberg. Mackanin previously served the same role for the Pittsburgh Pirates in 2005 and the Cincinnati Reds in 2007.
  - At Wrigley Field, Jake Arrieta became the first pitcher in the major leagues to win 20 games this season and the first Cubs pitcher since Jon Lieber in 2001 to win 20 in a season. Arrieta shutout the Milwaukee Brewers, 4–0, allowing three hits and striking out 11 in his fourth complete game and third shutout of the season to record his 18th consecutive quality start, which is also the most in Cubs history. With 209 strikeouts on the season, Arrieta also became the first Cubs pitcher to win 20 games and strike out 200 batters in a season since Ferguson Jenkins in 1971. Besides, Kris Bryant hit his 26th home run of the season to eclipse a Cubs rookie record of 25 home runs held by Billy Williams since the 1961 season.
- September 24 :
  - Mike Hazen was introduced as the new senior vice president and general manager of the Boston Red Sox. Hazen has spent 10 years in the organization serving in various capacities in the front office, the past three as the assistant general manager in the Ben Cherington regime. The announcement was made just over a month after Dave Dombrowski was named president of baseball operations of the organization. Dombrowski said he had a list of 30 names he considered for the GM opening upon arriving in Boston, adding that he only interviewed two of the potential candidates, Hazen and Quinton McCracken, a former 12-year big leaguer who most recently has been serving as the director of player development for the young and upcoming Houston Astros. Hazen's familiarity and track record with the Red Sox won out and gives the team continuity.
  - The Kansas City Royals defeated the Seattle Mariners, 10–4, becoming division champs for the first time in three decades to end the longest MLB division title drought by any team. It is Kansas City's first division title since 1985, when George Brett led the Royals to an American League West crown en route to their only World Series championship.
- September 26 – The Toronto Blue Jays clinched their first playoff berth since 1993 by defeating the Tampa Bay Rays, 10–8. ending the longest playoff drought by any MLB team. Later in the day, the New York Mets captured they first National League East division title in nine years, with a 10–2 victory over the Cincinnati Reds.
- September 27 – In a creative way, the Boston Red Sox closed out their 2015 home schedule by blanking the Baltimore Orioles for the third straight day, completing a three-game sweep with a 2–0 victory. Rookie pitcher Henry Owens stroke out five, gave up three hits and walked one in 7 2/3 innings, while Blake Swihart hit a solo home run and Brock Holt scored one run. The Red Sox finished their 104th season in Fenway Park with a 43–38 record, a nine-game improvement over last season's 34–47. The previous day, first-time starter Craig Breslow and other six relievers combined on a five-hitter, 8–0 victory. The improbable three-game scoreless streak began with Rich Hill, a 35-year-old recycled starter who threw his first shutout in almost a decade, blanking the Orioles 7–0 while striking out 10 in the process. It is the first time the Orioles franchise was shut out in three straight games by the same opponent since the St. Louis Browns lost consecutive 1–0 games to the Chicago White Sox in April 1909. For Boston, this is the first sweep of a three-game set without allowing a run since September 19–21, 1958, against the Washington Senators.
- September 28 – Jerry Dipoto was introduced as the Seattle Mariners new general manager and executive president of the team. He will replace dismissed GM Jack Zduriencik. Dipoto, 47, enjoyed an eight-year major league career as a relief pitcher for the Cleveland Indians, New York Mets and Colorado Rockies. He then joined the Boston Red Sox as a scout in 2003 and later earned the position of scouting director with the Colorado Rockies and the Arizona Diamondbacks, serving as interim GM in Arizona following the dismissal of Josh Byrnes. Before the 2012 season, Dipoto was named GM of the Angeles Angels and served in that capacity until this summer, when he resigned abruptly following clashes with manager Mike Scioscia, who reportedly took umbrage to Dipoto's attempts to provide him with analytical data for the purposes of aiding his in-game decision-making. The dispute escalated to the point where Dipoto walked away from the organization. His most significant transactions for the Angels included the signing of free agents Albert Pujols, Josh Hamilton, C. J. Wilson and Joe Smith, as well as making trades for Huston Street, Zack Greinke, David Freese, Chris Iannetta, Hector Santiago, Tyler Skaggs and Andrew Heaney. After a brief stop as a senior adviser with the Red Sox, he received the opportunity to join the Seattle organization. Mariners CEO Howard Lincoln said that Dipoto will be given what he needs to create the roster he wants, whether it is through developing the farm system or through trades and free agency. With the Toronto Blue Jays making the postseason, no team in baseball has been out of the playoffs longer than the Mariners. Their last postseason appearance was in 2001.
- September 29 :
  - September 29 – The Oakland Athletics announced that Dr. Justine Siegal would serve as a guest instructor for their 2015 Instructional League club, making her the first female coach to be hired by a Major League Baseball organization. Siegal, who previously worked for the Athletics and other five teams during spring training in 2011, will pitch batting practice for Oakland players from October 4 through 17 at the Lew Wolff Training Complex in Mesa, Arizona.
  - Clayton Kershaw led the Los Angeles Dodgers to their third straight National League West Division title, pitching a one-hit shutout with 13 strikeouts and only a walk, as Los Angeles beat Madison Bumgarner and the San Francisco Giants, 8–0, at AT&T Park. Kershaw finally got the best of his 2015 nemesis in the fourth matchup of the year against 2014 World Series MVP Bumgarner, striking out the side in order three times and retiring the final 19 batters, as the Dodgers snapped a four-game losing streak. Kershaw defeated Bumgarner for the first time in their four meetings this year and his second win in their seven career meetings. He is now six strikeouts away from 300 in the season, while the Dodgers captured their 14th NL West title and earned their 29th playoff berth overall and 20th in Los Angeles.
- September 30 – The Toronto Blue Jays clinched its first American League East division crown since the 1993 season and the sixth in franchise history with a 15–2 blowout of the Baltimore Orioles in Camden Yards. In National League action, the St Louis Cardinals defeated the Pittsburgh Pirates 11–1 at PNC Park, to clinch their third straight Central division title. St. Louis will host Game 1 of the NL Division Series on October 9 as it chases the franchise's third title in a decade.

=== October ===
- October 1 – The New York Yankees clinched an American League playoff berth for the first time since 2012 by defeating the Boston Red Sox, 4–1, at Yankee Stadium. With the Toronto Blue Jays having won the AL East title, the Yankees are locked into the top spot wild card spot and will host the one-game wild card playoff. In addition, the Yankees became the first AL team, and the eighth overall, to top 10,000 regular-season victories with this win. Furthermore, the Texas Rangers clinched a wild-card spot and put on the verge of their first AL West division title since 2011, following a 5–3 victory over the Los Angeles Angels of Anaheim at Globe Life Park.
- October 3 – Washington Nationals right-hander Max Scherzer pitched his second no-hitter of the season in a 2–0 victory over the New York Mets at Citi Field. Scherzer had a perfect game until the sixth inning, when third baseman Yunel Escobar committed an error on a ground ball hit by Kevin Plawecki. After that, Scherzer was untouchable, striking out nine of the next 12 batters he faced for a total of 17 strikeouts, setting a new Nationals record and a personal career high. At one point, he struck out nine consecutive batters. Scherzer previously hurled a no-hitter against the Pittsburgh Pirates on June 20, when he came within one strike of a perfect game before hitting José Tábata. Scherzer also became the sixth pitcher to throw two no-hitters in the same season. Roy Halladay was the last to have that distinction, pitching a perfect game in the 2010 regular season and a no-hitter in the postseason. The others are Nolan Ryan in 1973, Virgil Trucks in 1952, Allie Reynolds in 1951, and Johnny Vander Meer in 1938 – the first and only pitcher in major league history to have thrown no-hitters in consecutive starts. In addition, Scherzer tied Ryan for the most strikeouts in any no-hitter and he set the record for the most strikeouts in a no-hit, no-walk game, set by Clayton Kershaw in 2014. Besides, the Scherzer second no-hitter was the seventh of this season, matching the record set in 1990, 1991 and 2012.
- October 4 :
  - At Globe Life Park in Arlington, the Texas Rangers won the American League West division title by defeating the Los Angeles Angels of Anaheim 9–2. As a result, the Rangers will play their first game against the Toronto Blue Jays in the AL Division Series on October 8 at Rogers Centre. Meanwhile, even though the Houston Astros lost to the Arizona Diamondbacks at Chase Field, 5–3, they claimed the second AL wild card after Anaheim's loss. This will be Houston's first trip to the MLB postseason since being swept by the Chicago White Sox in the 2005 World Series. Now the Astros will face the New York Yankees at Yankee Stadium on October 6, and the winner will take on the AL Central champion Kansas City Royals in the AL Division Series, starting on October 8.
  - On the final day of the season, Clayton Kershaw struck out seven batters in the Los Angeles Dodgers' 6–3 victory over the San Diego Padres. Overall, Kershaw posted a 16–7 record with a 2.13 ERA and a strikeout total of 301, to become the first pitcher to collect 300 or more strikeouts in a regular season since 2002, when Curt Schilling and Randy Johnson reached the milestone as Arizona Diamondbacks teammates. In addition, Kershaw became the only Dodgers pitcher other than Sandy Koufax to strike out 300 or more in a season.
  - The Boston Red Sox' season-ending surge finished with a 3–1 loss to the Cleveland Indians marked the team's fourth straight defeat, its longest losing streak since July, and left them with a 78–84 mark to conclude the season alone in last place in the American League East with a .481 record. The Sox endured back-to-back last-place finishes for the first time since 1929–1930. It was also the first time that the Sox have finished two consecutive seasons below .500 since a three-year fallow run from 1992 to 1994. Earliest in the day, the Red Sox announced that John Farrell will be back as the club manager in 2016, and that Torey Lovullo had signed a two-year agreement to remain as bench coach until 2017. Lovullo waived the right to pursue any major league managerial openings in the off-season. He served as Boston's acting manager since Farrell left to be treated for a lymphoma on August 14, and led the Sox to a 28–19 record.
- October 5 :
  - The Washington Nationals dismissed manager Matt Williams and his entire coaching staff. Nationals general manager Mike Rizzo gave the news during a meeting at Nationals Park. Williams, 49, had limited managerial experience when he was hired before the 2014 season, but he led the Nationals to a 96–66 record for the best record in the National League and an East Division in his first season. The Nationals lost to the San Francisco Giants in the Division Series and Williams was named NL Manager of the Year. Nevertheless, the Nationals went 83-79 this year, which resulted in a disappointing second-place finish after Washington entered the season with high expectations. Williams had to deal with a long list of injuries, including to half of the everyday lineup for long stretches, which was available for only two games all season. Overall, Washington went 179–145 with Williams during his two seasons tenure. The Nationals were a huge favorite to win the World Series during spring training, especially after they signed free-agent pitcher Max Scherzer in the offseason. But Williams' job appeared to be in jeopardy after the Nationals were swept in a three-game series against the New York Mets during the second week of September, losses that put Washington seven games behind first place and eventual champion Mets. According to a source, Rizzo was apologetic when he gave Williams the news about his dismissal.
  - New York Yankees pitcher CC Sabathia announced that he would be checking into alcohol rehabilitation and miss the postseason. The statement was released by the Yankees just one day before their scheduled AL wild-card game against the Houston Astros. Sabathia said, "As difficult as this decision is to share publicly, I don't want to run and hide. But for now please respect my family's need for privacy as we work through this challenge together." The development stunned the Yankees community, but teammates and coaches expressed nothing but support and lauded Sabathia's courage and leadership.
  - The Los Angeles Angels of Anaheim hired Billy Eppler as their general manager and signed him to a four-year contract, a deal that could extend his tenure in Anaheim beyond that of team's manager Mike Scioscia. Eppler, 40, worked as a New York Yankees assistant general manager and was a finalist for the Angels job when the team hired Jerry Dipoto after the 2011 season. Eppler was also a finalist for the Seattle Mariners GM job that went to Dipoto last week. Scioscia's 10-year contract expires after the 2018 season, while Eppler's contract extends through the 2019 season. Neither of the two previous general managers hired by Angels' owner Arte Moreno, Tony Reagins and Dipoto, had a contract that outlasted Scioscia's. Reagins served the Angels from 2007 until his 2011 resignation, while Dipoto resigned on July 1 amid renewed friction with Scioscia.
  - The Oakland Athletics promoted Billy Beane to the role of executive vice president of baseball operations and David Forst to general manager. Beane served as the team's general manager starting after the 1997 season. During his 18 seasons at the helm, Oakland had a 1552–1362 (.533) record, winning six American League West titles and two AL Wild Card spots in 2001 and 2014. Forst recently completed his 12th year as the Athletics assistant general manager and 16th with the organization. By making this pair of promotions, the Athletics adopted the same management structure employed by a number of other teams who have both a president and GM of baseball operations, including the Arizona Diamondbacks, Boston Red Sox, Chicago Cubs, Chicago White Sox, Los Angeles Dodgers and Philadelphia Phillies.

==== MLB Postseason ====
- October 6 :
  - The Cleveland Indians announced that general manager Chris Antonetti has been promoted to the role of president of baseball operations. Antonetti, 41, served as the Indians' GM for five years as an assistant for former team's president Mark Shapiro and has been in the Cleveland organization since 1999. Under his guide, the Indians reached the postseason as a Wild Card team in 2013 and have had three consecutive winning seasons from 2013 to 2015 with Tito Francona at the helm. Antonetti also oversaw the signings of Michael Brantley, Carlos Carrasco, Yan Gomes, Jason Kipnis, Corey Kluber to long-term extensions, and signed players such as Cody Allen, Trevor Bauer, Francisco Lindor and Danny Salazar, who are all controlled for the foreseeable future. The Indians also announced the promotions of Mike Chernoff to the title of general manager and Derek Falvey to the role of assistant general manager. These moves reflect a structure that a number of other MLB teams have recently adopted.
  - The upstart Houston Astros, just two years removed from a 111-loss season, beat the New York Yankees 3–0 at Yankee Stadium, as they secured their spot in this winner-take-all game, advancing to the American League division series against the Kansas City Royals. Pitching on three days rest, Dallas Keuchel allowed three singles in six innings and combined with three relievers in the three-hit shutout. The offensive support came from Colby Rasmus and Carlos Gómez, who batted solo home runs against Masahiro Tanaka, and Jose Altuve with an RBI-single off Dellin Betances. The Yankees, who still have not led in a postseason game since a four-game sweep by the Detroit Tigers in 2012, reached their fifth consecutive loss in the postseason to match a franchise record. The Astros now will face the defending AL champion Royals, starting on October 8 at Kauffman Stadium.
- October 7 – Jake Arrieta led the Chicago Cubs to their first postseason victory in 12 years, shutting out the Pittsburgh Pirates, 4–0, in the National League Wild Card Game. As a result, Pittsburgh was eliminated after finishing second in the major leagues with 98 victories this year (the Cubs were third with 97). Arrieta, who topped the majors with 22 wins, pitched a four-hit complete game and struck out 11 without a walk. Dexter Fowler hit a solo home run and scored three times for the Cubs, while Kyle Schwarber, a rookie who began his season in Double-A, hit an RBI-single off Pittsburgh starter Gerrit Cole in the first inning and added a towering 430 feet, two-run homer out of PNC Park in the third, as Chicago raced to an early lead and let Arrieta do the rest. Conversely, the Pirates dropped a second consecutive home Wild Card Game. Last season, Pittsburgh lost that game, 8–0, to the eventual World Series Champion San Francisco Giants behind a pitching gem from Madison Bumgarner and a grand slam by Brandon Crawford. To complete his feat, Arrieta tossed the first complete-game shutout for the Cubs in the postseason since Claude Passeau threw a one-hitter in the 1945 World Series against the Detroit Tigers. It was the Cubs' first step toward their ultimate goal of ending a 107-year World Series championship drought, as they advanced to face the St. Louis Cardinals (whose 100 wins relegated the Pirates and Cubs to the Wild Card Game) in the National League Division Series, which begins on October 9 at Busch Stadium.
- October 8 :
  - Robinson Chirinos hit a two-run home run, Rougned Odor added a solo homer and scored three runs, and the Texas Rangers beat David Price and the Toronto Blue Jays 5–3 in Game 1 of the ALDS, as postseason baseball returned to Toronto for the first time in 22 years. Yovani Gallardo allowed two runs and four hits in five innings and was credited with the win.
  - The Houston Astros scored three runs in the first two innings against Yordano Ventura to defeat the host Kansas City Royals, 5–2, in Game 1 of the ALDS. Astros starter Collin McHugh shut out the Royals over six innings, and three relievers took over and got the game to Luke Gregerson, who handled the ninth for a save. George Springer batted a solo home run and Colby Rasmus hit a two-run one homer, while Jose Altuve went 3-for-5 with one run and an RBI.
- October 9 :
  - Hanser Alberto lined a tiebreaking single to center in the 14th inning, helping the Texas Rangers beat the highly favored Toronto Blue Jays, 6–4, for a 2–0 lead in the best-of-five ALDS. Alberto, who was only in the lineup because third baseman Adrián Beltré was out with a strained back, had made a costly fielding error that led to Toronto's first two runs but redeemed himself with his big hit in extra innings. Alberto also had a sacrifice fly early in the game. Keone Kela worked one inning for the win, and Ross Ohlendorf finished for a save. LaTroy Hawkins was charged with the loss. The underdog Rangers will try to sweep the Blue Jays at home in Game 3.
  - The Kansas City Royals rallied from a three-run early deficit, getting a go-ahead hit from Ben Zobrist in the seventh inning, and beat the Houston Astros 5–4 to tie the ALDS at a game apiece. The Astros mauled Johnny Cueto from the start, scoring their four runs in the first three innings. But the Royals tied the game at four off Scott Kazmir and two relievers in the sixth, and took the lead in the seventh when Alcides Escobar led off with a triple and Zobrist followed with his single. Kelvin Herrera and Ryan Madson each tossed a scoreless inning for the Royals, and Wade Davis came on to close it. Herrera was credited with the win, while Will Harris got the loss. Colby Rasmus hit one home run, a double and drove in two runs for Houston, becoming the first player in major league Bhistory to collect at least an extra-base hit in his first six postseason games.
  - John Lackey outpitched old Boston Red Sox teammate Jon Lester, allowing two hits into the eighth inning, and rookies Tommy Pham and Stephen Piscotty each homered late for the St. Louis Cardinals, in a 4–0 victory over the visiting Chicago Cubs in the opener of their NL Division Series. Piscotty scored the first run of the game on and RBI-single by Matt Holliday in the first inning. Lackey protected the 1–0 lead by holding the Cubs hitless for five innings, striking out five and walking one in his start. Lester, who struck out nine, gave up a solo home run to Pham after one out in the eight. Lester followed with his first walk of the game before being relieved by Pedro Strop, who gave up a two-run homer to Piscotty. Kevin Siegrist struck out the two batters he faced to end the eighth inning, and Trevor Rosenthal gave up a single and a walk but struck out three in finishing the three-hitter.
  - The New York Mets defeated the Los Angeles Dodgers, 3–1, in Game 1 of the NLDS, behind seven shutout innings from Jacob deGrom and key hits by David Wright and Daniel Murphy. The young deGrom outpitched Clayton Kershaw, whose postseason struggles continued in the Dodgers loss, with deGrom delivering the Mets their first postseason victory since 2006. Murphy opened the scoring off Kershaw with a solo home run in the fourth inning, while Wright capped the victory with a two-run single off Pedro Báez in the seventh. Adrián González hit a RBI-single off Tyler Clippard in the eight for the only Dodgers run, and Jeurys Familia earned the save in 1 1/3 innings of relief for the Mets. deGrom, who matched Tom Seaver's franchise record with 13 strikeouts in a postseason game, combined with Kershaw (11) to become the first pitchers to record at least 11 strikeouts in the same game in postseason history. Besides, Kershaw has posted a 1–6 record with a 7.23 ERA in 12 postseason games.
  - The Seattle Mariners announced that Lloyd McClendon will not return as the team's manager in 2016. The Mariners, based on the decision of new general manager Jerry Dipoto, decided to part ways with McClendon after two seasons, a span over which he compiled a winning record of 163-161 (.503). McClendon guided the Mariners to an 87–75 mark in his first season, but in 2015, despite high preseason expectations, Seattle finished 10 games under .500 and in fourth place in the American League West. McClendon is under contract for 2016, but Dipoto was given the autonomy to determine whether to keep him or move on with his own manager. McClendon previously managed the Pittsburgh Pirates from 2001 to 2005.
- October 10 :
  - Jorge Soler hit a two-run home run that fueled a five-run second inning, and the Chicago Cubs held off the St. Louis Cardinals, 6–3, to even the NLDS at one game apiece. The Cubs scored their five runs on a single, one walk, two errors, and two successful squeeze bunts before Soler's blast to center field. Five unearned runs were charged to St.Louis starter Jaime García, who was lifted because of a stomach ailment after second inning meltdown and charged with the loss. Dexter Fowler, Starlin Castro and Soler each had two of Chicago's six hits in a game played in front of a lively crowd of 47,859, a postseason record at 10-year-old Busch Stadium, that included thousands of Cubs fans. The Cardinals homered three times, including a leadoff shot by Matt Carpenter and consecutive shots by Kolten Wong and Randal Grichuk with two outs in the fifth inning, which chased Cubs starter Kyle Hendricks one out shy of qualifying for the victory in his postseason debut. Travis Wood, Trevor Cahill and Héctor Rondón combined for 4 1/3 scoreless innings of relief, with Wood getting the win and Rondón a save.
  - The Los Angeles Dodgers tied their best-of-five NLDS against the visiting New York Mets with a 5–2 comeback win after a four-run rally in the seventh inning, keyed by a controversial and hard slide from Chase Utley that sent Mets shortstop Rubén Tejada to the hospital with a fractured right fibula. Adrián González hit a two-run double with the game 2–1, two outs and runners at the corners, highlighting the rally after Howie Kendrick's fielder's-choice grounder that resulted in the tying run scoring on an overturned call after Utley's slide upended Tejada. González scored the fourth run of the inning on a double by Justin Turner. Zack Greinke allowed two runs and five hits in seven innings, striking out eight and walking none to take the win. Chris Hatcher pitched a perfect eight inning and Kenley Jansen closed the ninth for the save, completing a five-hitter. Noah Syndergaard took the loss, allowing three runs on five hits and four walks, striking out nine in 6 1/3 innings. Yoenis Céspedes and Michael Conforto hit solo home runs against Greinke in the second, while Andre Ethier had an RBI double for the Dodgers in the fourth.
- October 11 :
  - Dallas Keuchel remained undefeated at Minute Maid Park with a sterling pitching performance, and Chris Carter went 3-for-3 with a double and one home run, leading the Houston Astros to a 4–2 win over the Kansas City Royals for a 2–1 lead in the best-of-five ALDS. Keuchel improved to 16–0 at home with a 1.45 ERA by allowing one run on five hits and three walks with seven strikeouts, throwing a season-high 124 pitches and going deep in each of his final two innings. Lorenzo Cain hit a solo homer for the Royals leading off the fourth inning. After that, Keuchel pitched out of a jam in which the Royals had two base runners in the fifth, and retired Alex Gordon with a runner on third base in the sixth inning. Then Carlos Gómez singled in the bottom of the sixth to score George Springer and make it a 3–1 game. In the seventh, with one runner on second and Cain representing the tying run, Keuchel struck out him to preserve the lead and cap his outing. As for Carter, who finished a triple shy of the cycle, he hit a double in the fifth inning and subsequently scored the go-ahead run on an RBI single by Jason Castro. He then belted a first-pitch leadoff homer in the seventh off reliever Danny Duffy, bringing the score to 4–1. Kansas City starter Edinson Vólquez fell to 0–3 in his postseason career by allowing five hits and three runs in 5 2/3 innings. Reliever Tony Sipp earned the hold with 2/3 innings of work, and Luke Gregerson gave up a leadoff homer to Gordon in the ninth, before finishing off the Astros' first playoff game in Houston in 10 years with a four-out save.
  - Troy Tulowitzki drove in four runs, including three with a home run for his first hit in the ALDS, and Marco Estrada held the Texas Rangers to five hits and one run in 6 1/3 innings, as the Toronto Blue Jays cut their deficit to 2–1 in the best-of-five series with a 5–1 victory at Globe Life Park. Estrada, who made his first postseason start and third postseason appearance, used his fastball-changeup combination and did not walk a batter, striking out four while throwing 57 of his 89 pitches for strikes. Toronto started the sixth inning with consecutive singles to chase Rangers starter Martín Pérez, and Edwin Encarnación then drew a 10-pitch walk from reliever Chi Chi Gonzalez to load the bases before the Rangers' fourth double play in as many innings, twice with the bases loaded, that prevented any runs from scoring. Tulowitzki, by then 0-for-11 in the series, followed with his homer against González on a full-count changeup. Previously, Tulowitzki have walked with the bases loaded in the fourth inning. The first Blue Jays run came on a double play grounder with the bases loaded and no out in the second inning. Overall, Pérez gave up four runs on six hits and three walks in five plus innings and was charged with the loss. The Estrada performance was backed up by four relievers who delivered 7 2/3 perfect innings.
- October 12 :
  - The Kansas City Royals overcame a four-run deficit to stave off elimination against the Houston Astros and send the ALDS back to Kansas City for a decisive fifth game. The Royals scored five times in the eighth inning to defeat the Astros, 9–6, and even the best-of-five series at two games apiece. Kansas City began the eight inning with four consecutive singles off reliever Will Harris, and all four runners scored to tie the game. Harris then was relieved by Tony Sipp, who suffered the loss, though, after allowing a fifth consecutive single to Eric Hosmer, who drove in the first run and scored the go-ahead run to cap the five-run eighth. The Royals took advantage when Astros shortstop Carlos Correa could not handle a deflected grounder that might have been a double-play ball and committed an error. Later in the inning, Alex Gordon batted an RBI groundout that put Kansas City ahead, while Hosmer blasted a two-run homer in the ninth inning to make it 9–6. Royals starter Yordano Ventura allowed three runs with eight strikeouts in five innings, giving up solo homers to Carlos Gómez and Correa. Ventura was followed by Kelvin Herrera, who allowed one run in the sixth, and Ryan Madson, who gave up back-to-back homers to Correa and Colby Rasmus in the seventh and still got the win. Wade Davis pitched two scoreless innings for his second save. As for Rasmus, it was his third home run in the series and the fourth in five postseason games, as he homered in the Astros' AL wild-card win over the New York Yankees. Astros rookie right-hander Lance McCullers Jr. was sharp in his postseason debut, limiting the Royals to two runs on two hits and two walks with seven strikeouts over 6 1/3 innings. McCullers allowed a two-run homer to Salvador Pérez in the second inning to give the Royals an early lead, but retired 15 of the next 18 batters before leaving after hitting Pérez with a pitch with one out in the seventh. Besides his costly error, Correa homered twice, doubled, singled, drove in four runs and scored two times in four at-bats. At 21 years and 20 days old, he became the youngest player in American League history to record a multi-homer game in the postseason.
  - The Toronto Blue Jays stayed alive in the postseason by relying on the long ball and their Cy Young Award winners R. A. Dickey and David Price, beating the Texas Rangers 8–4 and even the ALDS at two games apiece, to force a deciding Game 5 at home. Josh Donaldson, Chris Colabello and Kevin Pillar each hit home runs off Rangers starter Derek Holland with Toronto's season hanging in the balance for the second consecutive game. Pillar went 3-for-4 and finished with three RBI, while Donaldson and Colabello each drove in two runs. Overall, Toronto racked up 12 hits. Dickey made his first career postseason appearance a memorable one, allowing only one run on five hits with three strikeouts and no walks, even if he did not qualify for the win. Dickey was pulled by manager John Gibbons with a 7–1 lead and two outs in the fifth inning. Price, who was the losing pitcher in the series opener, was out of the mix for an eventual start in Game 5. Price then retired the next nine outs, working into the eighth inning to pick up the victory despite allowing three runs, while Aaron Sanchez and Roberto Osuna combined on 1 1/3 innings of perfect relief. The Blue Jays will try to become only the third of 30 teams to win a best-of-five series after losing the first two games at home. The 2001 New York Yankees pulled off such a comeback in a division series against the Oakland Athletics, and the San Francisco Giants did it against the Cincinnati Reds in 2012.
  - The Chicago Cubs set a postseason mark for a club with six home runs and beat the St. Louis Cardinals, 8–6, for a 2–1 lead in the best-of-five NLDS playoffs. Cubs starter Jake Arrieta struck out nine before departing in the sixth inning, and the bullpen finished the job in the first playoff game at Wrigley Field in seven years. Kyle Schwarber and Starlin Castro hit solo home runs against Michael Wacha in the second and fourth innings, respectively. In the fifth, Kris Bryant hit a two-run homer off Wacha and Anthony Rizzo added a solo shot against reliever Kevin Siegrist. Then, Jason Heyward responded with a two-run homer in the sixth, which got to Arrieta for four runs in his worst start in four months, but the Cardinals were unable to keep the Cubs in the ballpark. In the bottom of the inning, Jorge Soler connected a two-run blast against Adam Wainwright and made it a 7–4 game. The final homer for Chicago went to Dexter Fowler, a solo shot against Jonathan Broxton in the eight inning. St. Louis trailed 8–4 before Stephen Piscotty hit a two-run shot against Héctor Rondón with two outs in the ninth, which caused alarm at Wrigley Field, but Rondón retired Matt Holliday on a groundout for the final out.
  - The New York Mets crushed the Los Angeles Dodgers, 13–7, in the first postseason game played at Citi Field. The Mets took an early lead in the second inning on a bases-loaded double from Curtis Granderson, erasing a three-run deficit and never looked back to set a franchise postseason run record and take a 2–1 advantage over the Dodgers in the NLDS playoffs, despite a subpar outing from Matt Harvey. Harvey labored through five innings in his postseason debut, allowing three runs (two earned) on seven hits and two walks, striking out seven while throwing a total of 97 pitches. Harvey was backed by four relievers that combined to throw four solid innings to preserve the victory. Granderson drove in five runs with two doubles, Yoenis Céspedes belted a three-run home run, and Travis d'Arnaud added a two-run shot with an RBI-single. Dodgers starter Brett Anderson took the loss, as he allowed six runs and seven hits in three ineffective innings. After that, Alex Wood was charged with four runs and Pedro Báez was tagged with three more without retiring a hitter. Yasmani Grandal hit a single to drove in the first two runs for Los Angeles, while Adrián González homered and Howie Kendrick slugged a three-run shot.
  - A total of 21 home runs were batted in the four Division Series played on this date, blowing away the single-day postseason record of 15, set back on October 3, 1995, just when major league's offensive atmosphere was heightened. Moreover, the eight home runs combined by the Chicago Cubs and St. Louis Cardinals at Wrigley Field also set a record for a postseason game, while the 61 runs scored in the four games surpassed the previous high of 48 stabilized on October 2, 2002.
- October 13 :
  - The Chicago Cubs clinched a postseason series at Wrigley Field for the first time ever, after beating the St. Louis Cardinals to win the NL Division Series in four games. A day after hitting a postseason-record six homers, the Cubs got home runs from Javier Báez, Anthony Rizzo and Kyle Schwarber en route to the NL Championship Series. Báez hit a three-run homer in the second inning, Rizzo belted a tiebreaking home run with two outs in the sixth, and Schwarber cleared the right field scoreboard with his 7th-inning blast to give the Cubs a 6–4 lead. The shot by Rizzo, was his second in two games against reliever Kevin Siegrist, who was charged with the loss. The Cubs fell behind quickly on Stephen Piscotty's two-run homer in the first off starter Jason Hammel, who left after giving up two runs over three innings. Seven relievers combined to hold the Cardinals to two runs and five hits the rest of the way. Trevor Cahill earned the win, and Héctor Rondón closed the nine for the save. Following an MLB-best 100–62 record in the regular season, the Cardinals failed to advance in the postseason after winning at least one series the previous four years. Pitching on three days rest, St. Louis starter John Lackey gave up four runs and four hits over three innings after out-pitching Jon Lester, 7–0, in the series opener. The Cubs last reached the NLCS in 2003, when they lost in seven games to the Florida Marlins, the eventual 2003 World Series winners. Wrigley Field hosted its first Cubs game in 1916, eight years after they last won the World Series.
  - Clayton Kershaw finally came through the postseason, holding the New York Mets to just one run on three hits over seven innings, and leading the Los Angeles Dodgers to a 3–1 win at Citi Field. The victory leveled their NLDS at 2-2 and forced a decisive Game 5 at Los Angeles on October 15. As a result, the reigning National League MVP and three-time Cy Young Award winner snapped a five-start losing streak in the playoffs, the longest in Dodgers franchise history. Pitching on three days rest, following his Game 1 loss, Kershaw struck out eight and walked only one through 94 pitches, yielding his only run on a fourth-inning home run by Daniel Murphy. The Dodgers scored their runs in the third inning in a rally started by an-out single from Kershaw and keyed by an RBI-single by Adrián González, followed by a two-run double by former Met Justin Turner off New York rookie starter Steven Matz. The 24-year-old Matz pitched five-plus innings, allowing the three runs on six hits and two walks while striking out four batters. Matz went 4–0 with a 2.27 ERA in six major league starts in the regular season, and was pitching in a big league game for the first time in 19 days, after an ailing back sidelined him late in September. Still, he looked effective through 85 pitches, 50 of them for strikes. Kenley Jansen got four outs for his second save in the series. With two runners on base in the eighth and a 3-2 count, he retired Murphy on a fly out to right field. Jensen then worked a 1-2-3 ninth as the Dodgers ended a seven-game losing streak in road playoff games. The winner of Game 5 will host the wild-card Chicago Cubs in the NL Championship Series opener on October 17.
- October 14 :
  - The Toronto Blue Jays channeled their frustration into a four-run burst and a trip to the American League Championship with a 6–3 win over the Texas Rangers at Rogers Centre. With the best-of-five ALDS level at 2-2, a tense game turned during a stormy 53-minute seventh inning, which had managers and umpires checking the rule book, featured two dugout clearing confrontations, a full-capacity crowd showering the field with debris, two ejections, and Toronto playing the game under protest. Overcoming one of the most unusual plays in playoff history, José Bautista blasted a tiebreaking three-run home run off reliever Sam Dyson that would define this series. In the first inning, Prince Fielder hit an RBI grounder off Toronto starter Marcus Stroman to put ahead Texas 1–0. Shin-Soo Choo extended the margin to 2–0 with a solo shot to right field in the third. In the bottom of the inning, Bautista hit a double against Cole Hamels that drove in Ben Revere with the first Blue Jays run. Edwin Encarnación then pulled his team even with Texas, 2–2, with a solo blast off Hammels in the sixth, but the Rangers reclaimed a 3–2 lead on a controversial play that started the seventh inning on a weird path that would define the series. Rougned Odor led off the seventh with a single and went to third on a sacrifice and groundout. Odor scored when catcher Russell Martin's throw back to Sanchez on a 2-2 deflected off batter Choo and dribbled toward third base and allowed the tiebreaking to score. Home plate umpire Dale Scott initially ruled it a dead ball, but after Rangers manager Jeff Banister questioned the call, the umpires huddled and Odor was sent home. Martin was given an error. Blue Jays manager John Gibbons argued and fans littered the field as they booed while Gibbons asked for a video review. The call stood, and the Blue Jays announced that they were playing the game under protest. Texas committed three errors to start the Blue Jays' seventh. After a forced out at home, Dyson replaced Hamels to face Josh Donaldson, whose flare to second base eluded Odor, who got the force at second as the tying run scored. Bautista then hit his two-out, mammoth homer to left field to give the Blue Jays a definitive 6–3 lead. Hamels allowed five runs (two earned) on four hits and two walks while striking out eight in 6 1/3 innings to take the loss. Reliever Aaron Sanchez pitched 1 1/3 innings and was credited with the win, while Roberto Osuna struck out four in 1 2/3 innings and earned the save. The Toronto Blue Jays became one of only three teams to come back and win a best-of-five series after losing their first two games at home. The New York Yankees pulled off such a comeback in a division series against the Oakland Athletics in 2001, and the San Francisco Giants did it against the Cincinnati Reds in 2012 and won the World Series. The Blue Jays will now attempt to be in their first World Series in 22 years. They will first have to face the Kansas City Royals or Houston Astros in the best-of-seven ALCS.
  - Johnny Cueto hurled a masterpiece in the fifth and decisive game of the AL Division Series, holding the Houston Astros to two hits over eight innings, as the Kansas City Royals rallied once more for a 7–2 victory that sent them to the AL Championship Series for a second year in a row. Cueto, who was acquired in a July transaction with the Cincinnati Reds, retired the final 19 batters he faced after Luis Valbuena hit a two-run home run. in the second inning. It was the only mistake Cueto made. The right-hander walked none and struck out eight, his high in 15 starts with the Royals, including two appearances in the ALDS. With the Royals trailing by two runs in the fourth inning, Lorenzo Cain hit a single against Astros starter Collin McHugh before Eric Hosmer fought off a pitch and blooped a single to center field. Cain was running on the pitch from first base and kept running when center fielder Carlos Gómez fell down after fielding the ball, which allowed Cain to circle the bases and score. Alex Ríos then provided the key hit, a two-run double off reliever Mike Fiers in the fifth, and later scored on a Ben Zobrist sacrifice fly that gave Kansas City a 4–2 lead. Kendrys Morales capped the game with a three-run homer off Dallas Keuchel in the eighth to put it away. McHugh, who won the ALDS opener for Houston, allowed three runs in four-plus innings and charged with the loss. Wade Davis needed just eight pitches to retire the three batters he faced in the ninth. Kansas City will receive the Toronto Blue Jays at Kauffman Stadium in the ALCS opener on October 16.
- October 15 – Daniel Murphy provided most of the offense that allowed the New York Mets to edge the Los Angeles Dodgers, 3–2, to win the decisive Game 5 of the NLDS at Dodger Stadium. Mets starter Jacob deGrom struggled early in the game but regrouped and finished in a strong way. The Mets advanced to their first NLCS since 2006, as they did so by beating Clayton Kershaw and Zack Greinke, two of the top pitchers in major league, in the first and final games of the best-of-five series. The Mets jumped in front 1–0 in the first inning of decisive game, when Murphy hit a one-out RBI-double against Greinke. Four consecutive singles in the bottom of the inning off deGrom allowed the Dodgers to rally, with Justin Turner and Andre Ethier driving in one run apiece for a 2–1 Los Angeles lead. Murphy then opened the fourth inning with a single to right field. After one out, the Dodgers shifted three infielders to the right side and left no one near third base when left-handed hitter Lucas Duda came to bat. After Duda walked on a 3-1 pitch count, Murphy jogged to second and suddenly sprinted and stole third base unopposed against an infield shift, and scored the tying run on a Travis d'Arnaud sacrifice fly. Two innings later, Murphy smashed a go-ahead home run off Greinke that led the Mets over the Dodgers, 3–2. deGrom earned his second victory of the series, allowing two runs on six hits and three walks, while striking out seven in six innings of work. Noah Syndergaard pitched a scoreless inning of relief and Jeurys Familia was perfect in two innings and earned the save. Murphy, who went 7-for-21 (.333) in the five games, scored seven runs with five RBI and homered three times off Kershaw (2) and Greinke (1). As for Greinke, he allowed three runs on six hits and one walk and struck out nine in 6 2/3 innings, being credited with the loss. The Mets will face the Chicago Cubs in the NLCS beginning on October 17 at Citi Field stadium. The Mets will try to advance to their first World Series since 1986, while the Cubs try to do it for the first time since 1945.
- October 16 – Edinson Vólquez combined with three relievers on a three-hitter, Salvador Pérez hit a solo home run off Toronto Blue Jays starter Marco Estrada, and the Kansas City Royals opened the American League Championship Series with a 5–0 victory at Kauffman Stadium. Alcides Escobar and Lorenzo Cain also drove in runs off Estrada, who was charged with the loss. Then Eric Hosmer and Kendrys Morales added one RBI-run apiece off reliever LaTroy Hawkins to put the game away. Vólquez allowed two hits and stroke five with four walks in six innings, and was credited with the win. The Royals' bullpen finished off the club's eighth consecutive ALCS victory, dating back to the 2014 season.
- October 17 :
  - The Kansas City Royals rallied for five runs in the bottom of the seventh off Toronto Blue Jays left-hander David Price, erasing a three-run deficit and paving the way for a 6–3 victory at Kauffman Stadium in Game 2 of the American League Championship Series. Price had dominated the Royals until the seventh, retiring 18 batters in a row and allowing just a first-pitch single by Alcides Escobar to lead off the bottom of the first inning. But Kansas City erupted with five hits in the seventh, including a game-tying RBI single by Mike Moustakas and a go-ahead RBI double by Alex Gordon. Royals starter Yordano Ventura was solid through five innings, but he ran into trouble in the sixth, leaving the game with the bases loaded and one out, while trailing 3–0. Then reliever Luke Hochevar got two quick outs to keep Kansas City close. The Blue Jays were held scoreless through the first 11 innings of the series, but they finally broke out of their slump in the third, when Kevin Pillar and Ryan Goins batted consecutives doubles starting the inning. Edwin Encarnación and Troy Tulowitzki added RBI singles the sixth, and the way Price was dominating the Royals lineup, a 3–0 lead looked to be enough. After the Escobar's lead-off single, Price threw first-pitch strikes to 12 of 14 batters at one point and struck out the side in the sixth inning, giving no indication he was about to implode. Finally, Price was charged with five runs and six hits in 6 2/3 innings and got the loss. The Royals tacked on another run off the Toronto relief corps in the eighth, but it was unnecessary. Danny Duffy pitched a perfect seventh inning and was credited with the win, while Kelvin Herrera and Wade Davis finished off the Blue Jays with a scoreless inning apiece, with Davis earning the save.
  - Matt Harvey delivered 7 2/3 innings of four-hit, nine-strikeout ball, as the New York Mets surpassed the Chicago Cubs at Citi Field, 4–2, in Game 1 of the National League Championship Series. There were the four perfect innings with which Harvey started his work, commanding all four unhittable pitches, and striking out six of the 12 Cubs he faced, setting himself up to get deep in this game by averaging only 11 pitches an inning. Starlin Castro RBI-double ended Harvey's no-hitter bid and shutout in the fifth inning, even though a monster 463-foot eighth-inning home run by Kyle Schwarber ended his evening after 97 pitches, 64 of them for strikeouts. Mets second baseman Daniel Murphy opened the scoring with a two-out, first-inning solo homer against Cubs starter Jon Lester. After that, Curtis Granderson drove in two runs for New York with one single and a sacrifice fly, and Travis d'Arnaud hit a solo homer off the giant Mets apple in straightaway center field. Jeurys Familia followed Harvey with 1 1/3 innings of shutout relief for his third postseason save. Lester lasted 6 2/3 innings and was charged with loss, allowing four runs on eight hits and one walk, while striking out five batters. Murphy homered in his third consecutive postseason game, matching the franchise record set by Donn Clendenon in 1969. Murphy also matched a franchise single-postseason record with four home runs, set by Rusty Staub in 1973 and equaled by Mike Piazza in 2000 and Carlos Delgado in 2006.
- October 18 – The New York Mets used a combination of pitching and power to defeat Jake Arrieta and the Chicago Cubs, 4–1, and took a 2–0 lead in the best-of-seven National League Championship Series. Daniel Murphy smashed a two-run home run to cap a three-run first inning off Arrieta, and that was all the Mets and their starter Noah Syndergaard needed on a cold, windy night at Citi Field, where an enthusiastic crowd was dressed in winter jackets and most of the players used balaclavas to keep their heads warm. There was a time when Syndergaard touched 99 mph with his blazing fastball, keeping the Cubs hitters off balance with curveballs and changeups to strike out nine, while allowing one run on three hits and one walk in 5 2/3 innings to get the win. Curtis Granderson led off the first inning with a single and David Wright followed with an RBI-double before the Murphy homer. The Mets added an insurance run in the third, when Granderson walked, stole second and third bases, to score on an RBI-single by Yoenis Céspedes. To complete his stellar night, Granderson robbed Chris Coghlan of a likely home run with a leaping grab at the centerfield wall in the second inning. The only run for Chicago came in the sixth, when Dexter Fowler singled, advanced to second on wild pitch by Syndergaard, and scored on a double off the bat of Kris Bryant. Four Mets relievers combined to pitch 3 1/3 scoreless innings, with Jeurys Familia earning the save. Arrieta, who posted a 22–6 record with a 1.77 ERA and also hurled a no-hitter in the season, had his second consecutive subpar outing in the playoffs. He struck out eight across five innings and allowed four runs on four hits and two walks.
- October 19 – The Toronto Blue Jays bats came to life at Rogers Centre to beat the Kansas City Royals, 11–8, in Game 3 of the American League Championship Series. The Blue Jays opened the ALCS at Kansas City in frustrating form by getting shut out in Game 1 and blowing a 3–0 lead in the seventh inning of Game 2, but they returned to form when they came back to the stadium where they have won so often this year – a 53–28 record in the regular season. Toronto starter Marcus Stroman allowed four runs on 11 hits and one walk, and struck out only one batter in 6 1/3 innings. Even so, he was credited with the win. Kansas City took an early lead in the first inning, when lead-off hitter Alcides Escobar connected a triple and scored on a Ben Zobrist RBI-grounder. But Toronto answered in the second against Royals' Johnny Cueto, when Ryan Goins drove in two runs with a single and later scored on an RBI-single by Josh Donaldson that made a 3–1 game. In the third inning, Zobrist scored on a grounder by Eric Hosmer to cut the lead to one run. But Toronto crushed Cueto in the bottom of the inning, scoring six runs on a three-run homer by Troy Tulowitzki, a bases loaded walk by Russell Martin and an RBI-double by Kevin Pillar, which prompted Royals manager A. J. Hinch to summon reliever Kris Medlen. Donaldson connected a homer for a 9–2 lead after Medlen retired two batters. Then in the fifth inning, Escobar scored on wild pitch by Stroman and Mike Moustakas singled Zobrist to put the score 9–4, but Goins homered off Medlen in the bottom, and Toronto matched its postseason best with three homers in a game. Previously, the Blue Jays also hit three against the Texas Rangers in Game 4 of the ALDS. Toronto scored its last run in the eight on an RBI-single by José Bautista. Nevertheless, the resilient Royals tried to come back this time too, when Kendrys Morales capped a four-run surge with a two-run homer in the ninth before Roberto Osuna closed out the 11–8 victory.
- October 20 :
  - At Rogers Centre, the Kansas City Royals overwhelmed the Toronto Blue Jays in Game 4 of the American League Championship Series, 14–2, and are one victory from returning to the World Series for a second year in a row. Alcides Escobar, who sparked the offense with a leadoff single off R. A. Dickey in the first inning, finished with four RBI. In addition, Ben Zobrist belted a two-run homer and Alex Ríos went 3-for-3 with a solo shot, while Lorenzo Cain drove in three runs in a 15-hit attack against six Toronto pitchers. Former Cy Young Award winner Dickey gave up five runs in 1 2/3 innings that left Toronto in a 5–0 hole they could not overcome, despite scoring two runs in the third inning, and Liam Hendriks providing 4 1/3 innings of spotless relief to hold the Royals scoreless and to just one hit. But the Royals ended any chance of a rally roughing up LaTroy Hawkins, who came on in the seventh but did not retire a batter and allowed three runs on two hits and one walk. Ryan Tepera came to rescue him, but gave up four runs and five hits in 1 2/3 innings. Mark Lowe then replaced Tepera and allowed two runs in one inning. In a final act of desperation to save his relief corp for what a do-or-die Game Five, Blue Jays manager John Gibbons used utility infielder Cliff Pennington to get the final out, which he finally managed, but not before Kansas City pushed across two more runs that were charged to Lowe and completed the rout. Pennington, who allowed two hits and got one out, became the first primarily position player to pitch in major league postseason history. In contrast, the Kansas City bullpen marked the difference. Chris Young, who had not started a game since October 2, allowed two runs in 4 2/3 innings of work. Then Luke Hochevar, Ryan Madson, Kelvin Herrera and Franklin Morales delivered 4 1/3 scoreless innings, with Hochevar earning the win. Not only did four relievers to pitch 4 1/3 scoreless innings, but the offense supplied nine insurance runs after Young left the game to take a 3–1 lead in the best-of-seven series.
  - The New York Mets defeated the Chicago Cubs 5–2 in Game 3 of the National League Championship Series at Wrigley Field. David Wright and Yoenis Céspedes collected three hits apiece, Daniel Murphy homered for the fifth straight postseason game, and Jacob deGrom pitched through seven effective innings. The Mets broke a 2–2 tie on a wild-pitch strikeout in the sixth inning, as they moved to within one victory of their first trip to the World Series since the 2000 season. Céspedes hit a two-out double against Cubs starter Kyle Hendricks that brought Wright with the first run for New York in the first inning. Murphy then improved his remarkable postseason in the third, hitting his fifth homer in a row off Hendricks, to match Carlos Beltrán's MLB record for consecutive postseason games with a home run. DeGrom, who struggled in the bottom of the first inning, gave up a one-out home run to Kyle Schwarber and two singles in a total of 30 pitches. But he bounced back to retire 18 of the final 20 batters he faced. DeGrom then allowed only one hit in that stretch, on a 3-1 fastball up that Jorge Soler smacked for a solo homer that tied the game at 2–2 in the fourth. After that deGrom retired 11 batters in order, finishing with seven strikeouts and a walk. As for Hendricks, he lasted four innings before manager Joe Maddon went to his bullpen and, starting in the sixth, the Mets took advantage of some breaks. With two outs, and Céspedes running on third base, Trevor Cahill threw a knuckle curveball that Michael Conforto swung through the third strike, but the ball hit the dirt and spun away from the glove of catcher Miguel Montero, allowing Céspedes to score for a 3–2 Mets advantage. New York scored two more runs in the seventh on a single by Céspedes and a grounded out by Lucas Duda, which enabled to score Wright and Murphy, respectively. Tyler Clippard relieved deGrom in the eight and Jeurys Familia got the save with a perfect ninth inning.
- October 21 :
  - The Toronto Blue Jays received a pitching masterpiece from Marco Estrada, to keep their season alive with a 7–1 victory over the Kansas City Royals at Rogers Centre. Estrada allowed three hits and one run in 7 2/3 innings of work and faced the minimum 18 batters through six innings, as Toronto pulled to within 3–2 in the best-of-seven American League Championship Series. Estrada allowed a single to Alcides Escobar in the fourth inning and did not allow another hit until Salvador Pérez homered and Alex Gordon singled with two outs in the eighth inning. Chris Colabello gave Toronto the early lead with a second inning solo home run against Edinson Vólquez. Edwin Encarnación then walked with the bases loaded in the sixth and Vólquez was relieved by Kelvin Herrera, who struck out Colabello for the first out of the inning. But Troy Tulowitzki broke the game open in when he lined a three-run double off Herrera to give the Blue Jays a 5–0 lead. José Bautista and Kevin Pillar followed with RBI-doubles of their own in the seventh and eight innings to put the game away. The series will head back to Kansas City for Game 6 on October 23.
  - The New York Mets reached the World Series for the first time in 15 years, following a four-game sweep of the Chicago Cubs in Game 4 of the National League Championship Series at Wrigley Field, with an 8–3 victory before 42,227 spectators. Mets first baseman Lucas Duda provided a strong offensive effort, hitting a two-out, three-run home run to center field in the first inning to lift the Mets to an early lead. Then Travis d'Arnaud followed suit, driving a solo shot to right field to make it 4–0. Duda would follow up his game-breaker with a two-RBI double in the second as the Mets order batted around Jason Hammel to gain a 6–0 advantage. Duda, who also doubled in the ninth, was hitting .125 with no extra-base hits and 13 strikeouts in 24 at-bats before the game. Additionally, Daniel Murphy connected a two-run against Fernando Rodney in the eighth inning. It was his seventh homer of the playoffs, as the string includes a shot in the deciding Game 5 of the National League Division Series at Dodger Stadium on October 15. Murphy, who was tied with Carlos Beltrán for the postseason homer streak, also became the first player to hit a homer in six consecutive postseason games. He finished with four hits and batted .529 (9-for-17) in the series, earning NLCS Most Valuable Player honors. Bartolo Colón replaced rookie Steven Matz with two out in the fifth and runners on first and second, and struck out Kris Bryant swinging on a 3-2 pitch, preserving the Mets 6–1 lead. Colón got the win for his 1 1/3 inning effort, and three relievers finished the job. The Mets, who clinched their fifth NL pennant, also did it in 1969, 1973, 1986 and 2000, winning the World Series in 1969 and 1986. New York will face the winner of the Kansas City Royals–Toronto Blue Jays American League Championship Series beginning on October 27 at AL Champion ballpark.
- October 22 – Don Mattingly will not return as the Los Angeles Dodgers manager in 2016. Mattingly had one more year left in his contract but he and the Dodgers came to a mutual agreement. According to a teleconference with reporters, Mattingly offered no explanation for the mutual parting. "I'm doing what's best for myself; I'm doing what's best for the organization; I just look at it that it's the right time for both parties", he said.
- October 23 – The Kansas City Royals beat the visiting Toronto Blue Jays, 4–3, to earn their second straight trip to the World Series. The victory in Game 6 of the American League Championship Series sent the Royals into the World Series, starting on October 27 at Kauffman Stadium against the National League champion New York Mets. Lorenzo Cain scored from first base on a single by Eric Hosmer in the bottom of the eighth inning following a 45-minute rain delay, and it proved to be the winning run in an unexpected and exciting way. As for reliever Wade Davis, he performed a great escape in the ninth inning to seal the victory. In a historic feat, José Bautista hit a pair of home runs, including a game-tying two-run shot in the eighth inning, to become the first player in Blue Jays history with a multi-homer effort in a postseason game. Bautista also set the franchise single-postseason record by hitting four homers overall, but there would be no jubilant celebration afterward with the Royals overcoming the two blasts. Early solo home runs by Ben Zobrist and Mike Moustakas against David Price in the first two innings had staked Kansas City to a 2–0 lead, which Bautista cut in half with a solo homer off Yordano Ventura in the fourth. After that, Ventura gave up a one-out double to Edwin Encarnación in the sixth and was relieved by Kelvin Herrera, who retired the next five batters he faced. Alex Ríos then drove in an insurance run with a single in the seventh to increase the Royals lead to 3–1. Holding a two-run lead heading into the eighth, reliever Ryan Madson allowed a leadoff single to Ben Revere and struck out Josh Donaldson before yielding the two-run homer to Bautista. After a walk to Encarnación, Royals manager Yost pulled Madson and sent in Davis, who promptly retired the next two batters. In the bottom of the eight, Roberto Osuna was summoned by manager John Gibbons to get the heart of Kansas City's lineup. At this point the rain intervened and Davis had to wait in the clubhouse along with his teammates. After the delay, Cain promptly worked a leadoff walk from Osuna and Hosmer followed with a clean single that Bautista fielded down the right-field line. Rather than hit the cutoff man, Bautista threw to shortstop Troy Tulowitzki at second to keep Hosmer to a single, which gave the speedy Cain running full speed the entire way and slid into the plate easily ahead of Tulowitzki's throw for the game-winning run. When play resumed, not only did Hosmer had his RBI, because Davis returned after not pitching for over an hour. Davis then suddenly was wedged in an extremely tight spot when Toronto put runners on second and third bases with nobody out in the top of the ninth. But Davis responded, striking out the next two batters before retiring Donaldson on a ground ball to finish the game. Alcides Escobar earned ALCS Most Valuable Player honors after hitting .478 (11-for-23) with five RBI and six runs scored. The Royals-Mets will be the first MLB World Series ever played between two expansion teams.
- October 26 :
  - The Boston Red Sox announced that former Philadelphia Phillies general manager Rubén Amaro Jr. has been hired as the club's new first base coach. Amaro will also serve as Boston's outfield instructor and assist in coaching the club on baserunning. Amaro, who also had experience as an infielder/outfielder in the majors but has never coached on any level, has expressed an interest in managing a team in the future and his focus for the time being was on coaching. Amaro replaces Arnie Beyeler, who served as first-base coach for Boston the last three seasons. The move by a GM back onto the field is not without precedent, which was the case for the Miami Marlins this past season, when GM Dan Jennings was asked by team's owner Jeffrey Loria to take over after Mike Redmond was dismissed as manager. Amaro is signed with the Red Sox through the 2017 season.
  - Scott Servais was introduced as the new manager of the Seattle Mariners. Servais, who replaces departed Lloyd McClendon, will be the 17th full-time manager in Mariners history. Seattle's general manager Jerry DiPoto selected Servais from a group of six that included Charlie Montoyo, Phil Nevin, Dave Roberts, Jason Varitek and Tim Bogar, who will be on Servais' staff as Seattle's bench coach. Along with Bogar, Servais announced that Mel Stottlemyre Jr. will be his pitching coach. The other members of the staff are hitting coach Edgar Martínez and first base coach Chris Woodward, who will be retained from the previous staff. Servais, who is a former major league catcher with no prior managerial experience, served as assistant general manager for DiPoto with the Los Angeles Angels, where he oversaw scouting and player development.
- October 27 – The Kansas City Royals outlasted the New York Mets in a 14-inning, five-hour, nine-minute marathon, to win Game One of the World Series by a score of 5–4 at Kauffman Stadium. Alcides Escobar connected a leadoff, first pitch inside-the-park home run; Eric Hosmer hit a game-winning sacrifice fly, and Chris Young, who was scheduled to open Game Four, pitched three hitless innings of relief along with four strikeouts. The Royals sent the game to extra innings when, trailing 4–3 with one out in the bottom of the ninth, Alex Gordon drilled a dramatic home run to deep center field against Mets closer Jeurys Familia to tie it 4–4. It was a rare blown save opportunity by Familia, who matched a franchise record with 43 regular-season saves. Then he had logged 9 2/3 scoreless innings through two rounds of the postseason, including a six-out save against the Los Angeles Dodgers in decisive Game 5 of the National League Division Series. Hosmer, whose critical error in the eighth briefly gave the Mets the lead, redeemed himself with his sacrifice fly to right field off reliever Bartolo Colón to score Escobar, that set off a celebration for the Kansas City players and their devoted fans. It was a tumultuous contest filled with twists and turns before the first pitch. There was a note of sadness as word spread that the father of Kansas City's starting pitcher, Edinson Vólquez, had died back home in the Dominican Republic. Then the Fox Sports broadcast of the game was interrupted during 23 minutes in the middle of the fourth inning due to technical difficulties, with the MLB International crew eventually taking over for the Fox broadcasters, while allowing play to resume. The Mets were jolted in the first by the first pitch thrown by their Game One starter Matt Harvey, when Escobar drove a fly deep to left-center. Center fielder Yoenis Céspedes briefly took his eye off the ball to glance at left fielder Michael Conforto, but the ball descended past Céspedes' glove and struck him on the lower leg, kicking towards the left-field corner, as Escobar dashed around the bases for the first inside-the-park homer in the World Series since Mule Haas of the Philadelphia Athletics circled the bases in 1929. It also was the first in a World Series Game One since Casey Stengel of the New York Giants in 1923. After that, the Mets tied the game in the fourth inning with an RBI-single by Travis d'Arnaud, then took the lead on a Curtis Granderson solo home run in the fifth, and made it 3–1, in the sixth, on a sacrifice fly by Conforto. Harvey had retired eleven Kansas City hitters in a row heading to the bottom of the sixth, but that streak ended when the Royals rallied with two runs to tie the score, as Hosmer's first sacrifice fly scored Ben Zobrist, and Mike Moustakas's single scored Lorenzo Cain with the tying run. But Hosmer, a two-time Gold Glove first baseman, committed an error in the top of the eight inning that allowed the Mets to take a 4–3 lead and made him the potential scapegoat of the game, until Gordon rescued the Royals from the dead with his solo homer off Familia, then Hosmer got his redemption in extra innings. A total of 36 players were used in the game, including 13 pitchers. Besides, Kansas City outfielder Paulo Orlando became the first Brazilian-born player to appear in a World Series game. As the game wore on, the managers turned to veterans Colón (42) and Young (36). They matched zeros for two innings before the unexpected outcome of the 14th inning.
- October 28 – Johnny Cueto hurled a complete-game two-hitter, and the Kansas City Royals jumped on Jacob deGrom with a four-run fifth-inning rally, on the way to a 7–1 victory over the New York Mets and a 2–0 lead in the World Series. Cueto gave up two softly hit singles to Lucas Duda while going the distance, walking three and striking out four. The Royals scored their four runs in the fifth inning just on five singles and a walk, to take a 4–1 lead that never relinquished. The veteran Cueto faced the minimum nine batters through the first three innings, and although the Mets took a 1–0 lead in the fourth, Cueto never got rattled. After Duda's RBI single, Cueto retired 16 of the final 17 Mets batters he faced. As for deGrom, he held Kansas City to one hit through four innings but got in trouble in the fifth, when he walked Alex Gordon on a full-count slider leading off. Gordon advanced to second on a single by Alex Ríos and scored the tying run on an Alcides Escobar single. Ben Zobrist then advanced the runners to second and third with a groundout, before deGrom retired Lorenzo Cain for the second out, but Eric Hosmer responded with a tie-breaking, two-run single. Kendrys Morales then added another single, while Hosmer scored the fourth run of the inning on an RBI-single by Mike Moustakas. DeGrom, with a 3–0 record and a 1.80 ERA over 20 innings in the postseason coming in, allowed four runs on six hits and three walks while striking out two in five innings of work. Kansas City added three insurance runs in the eight, following an RBI-double by Alex Gordon, a sacrifice fly by Paulo Orlando, and an RBI-triple by Escobar. Hosmer now leads the Kansas City lineup with 15 postseason runs batted in. Earlier in the playoffs, Hosmer surpassed the franchise postseason record of 23 career RBI set by George Brett, and including the 2014 postseason, Hosmer is at 27 and counting. With his two-hit gem, Cueto became the first American League pitcher to throw a complete game in the World Series since Jack Morris did it for the Minnesota Twins in 1991. Moreover, not since Atlanta Braves' Greg Maddux in 1995 had a pitcher logged at least nine innings and allowed no more than two hits in the World Series. Additionally, Cueto allowed the fewest hits in a World Series complete game by an American League pitcher since Boston Red Sox's Jim Lonborg's one-hitter against the St. Louis Cardinals in 1967. On October 30, New York will host Kansas City in the first World Series game to be played at Citi Field ballpark. Forty-one of the 51 teams to take 2-0 leads in a best-of-seven World Series have gone on to win the title, according to the Elias Sports Bureau.
- October 29 :
  - The Texas Rangers announced that pitching coach Mike Maddux will not return to the next season. Maddux joined the Rangers before the 2009 season, when former team president Nolan Ryan brought him in from the Milwaukee Brewers, where Maddux was pitching coach from 2003 to 2008. Maddux had been among six coaches invited to return in 2015 and was previously offered a new contract that he had not signed. With Maddux departure, the Rangers are now searching for three new assistants, as bullpen coach Andy Hawkins resigned and hitting coach Dave Magadan left in hopes of finding a job closer to his home in Florida. Maddux is also leaving after serving four years as special assistant to general manager Jon Daniels.
  - The San Diego Padres hired Arizona Diamondbacks third base coach Andy Green as their new manager. Green takes over a team that underachieved despite San Diego general manager A. J. Preller hatched an aggressive offseason roster shuffle during the offseason. The Padres finished 74-88 and fourth place in the National League West Division, 18 games behind the division champion Los Angeles Dodgers. At this time, San Diego has had five straight losing seasons and has missed the playoffs for nine straight years. A former major league infielder, Green has four seasons of minor league managerial experience in spite of his young age (38). From 2011 through 2014, he managed in the D-Backs' minor league system, guiding the Missoula Osprey to a Pioneer League championship in 2012 and achieving a pair of postseason berths for the Double-A Mobile Bay Bears in 2013 and 2014, being named Southern League Manager of the Year in each of those two seasons.
  - The Toronto Blue Jays announced that general manager Alex Anthopoulos rejected a five-year contract extension and is leaving the team. The announcement was made the same day that he earned The Sporting News executive of the year honors. Since Anthopoulos joined the team in 2009, the Blue Jays posted a 489–483 record, including the American League East Division title with a 93–69 record, while earning their first trip to the postseason since winning the World Series in 1993. They were eliminated from the American League Championship Series by the Kansas City Royals in six games. According to a report, Anthopoulos chose to leave because of concerns over the imminent changing dynamic in Blue Jays new management. Mark Shapiro, who was the Cleveland Indians' general manager for eight years, was hired to become Toronto's president and CEO in August, and is slated to assume his duties with the team on November 2.
- October 30 – The New York Mets rallied from an early deficit to beat the Kansas City Royals, 9–3, in the first World Series game ever played at Citi Field, which set a record when 44,781 fans attended the game. Noah Syndergaard settled down after yielding three runs and six hits in the first two innings, Curtis Granderson and David Wright each belted a two-run home run, as the Mets took Game 3 of the series after two tough losses in Kansas City. Syndergaard's first pitch was a 97 mph fastball just off the inside corner and above the head of Royals leadoff hitter Alcides Escobar, who had tormented the Mets for crushing first-pitch fastballs in the series, including one for an inside-the-park home run in Game 1. Obviously, Syndergaard wanted to attack the Royals early, make them feel uncomfortable, a feat that Matt Harvey and Jacob deGrom had failed to accomplish in the first two games. Finally, Escobar struck out swinging, the first of six strikeouts for Syndergaard in the game. On a would-be inning-ending double play, Mets shortstop Wilmer Flores threw wide to first base, allowing Eric Hosmer to beat the throw and Ben Zobrist to score the game's opening run. The Royals did not attempt to retaliate after that, but there were certainly some discontented players in their clubhouse afterward. In the bottom of the inning, Granderson singled and Wright homered against Yordano Ventura which provided a 2–1 lead. But the Royals did not seem fazed. They scored two runs in the second on an RBI-single by Alex Ríos, who later scored on Travis d'Arnaud's passed ball. Then Granderson blasted another two-run homer in the third. Syndergaard had singled ahead of Granderson and he could continue to attack the Royals. After Escobar singled for the fourth hit of Kansas City the second inning, Syndergaard retired the next 12 Royals in order. Even in the sixth, when Syndergaard allowed a two-out single to Mike Moustakas and walked two consecutive batters to load the bases, he retired Ríos on a grounder to shortstop for the last out and complete his outing. Syndergaard was charged with three runs, giving up seven hits, two walks and striking out six in six innings. Michael Conforto hit an RBI-single in the fourth that put the score 5–3, as the Mets erupted for four runs in the sixth. Juan Uribe, just back from a chest injury, pinch-hit for Syndergaard and delivered an RBI single against Franklin Morales that put the Mets ahead 6–3. Then Wright added a two-run single against Kelvin Herrera and Yoenis Céspedes added a sacrifice fly. Aided by more unsteady fielding from a Royals team known for tight defense, New York collected hits from nine different players and finished with 12. Kansas City rookie Raúl A. Mondesí made history after debuting in a World Series game, becoming the first rookie to ever do so. As for Ventura, he was charged with the loss after allowing five runs on seven hits, while striking out one without walks in 3 1/3 innings. Lifted by the roars of the home fan base, the Mets narrowed the deficit in the best-of-seven World Series to 2–1.
- October 31 – The Kansas City Royals capitalized an error by New York Mets second baseman Daniel Murphy, and rallied for three runs in the eighth inning for a 5–3 victory at Citi Field and a 3-1 World Series lead. The Royals insurgence against relievers Tyler Clippard and Jeurys Familia wasted a pair of home runs hit by Michael Conforto and a strong start from Steven Matz, to put the Mets on brink of elimination. Besides Murphy's blunder and bullpen's fault, outfielder Yoenis Céspedes struggled in every aspect of the game. Kansas City closer Wade Davis came on in the eighth inning to register a six-out save, and Salvador Pérez went 3-for-4 with a double, one RBI and one run scored. Conforto bashed his first home run of the game against Kansas City starter Chris Young to lead off the third inning, giving the Mets a 1–0 lead. Wilmer Flores followed with a single, advanced on a wild pitch and was sacrificed to third by Matz, scoring on a Curtis Granderson's sacrifice fly to make it 2–0. In the fifth inning, Pérez hit a sinking liner to center field that turned into a double when Céspedes accidentally kicked it into left field as he reached down to try to make the catch. Next, Alex Gordon slapped an RBI single for the first Kansas City run. As for Céspedes, he previously misplayed and booted a ball into an inside-the-park home run by Alcides Escobar on Matt Harvey's first pitch in Game 1, yet Cespedes offered a poor optic when he jogged after the ball to retrieve it. After this, Conforto hit his second home run of the game off reliever Danny Duffy to lead off the bottom of the inning, giving the Mets a 3–1 lead. At age 22, Conforto became the first rookie to connect two homers in a World Series game since Atlanta Braves' Andruw Jones (19) did it at Yankee Stadium in 1996. Conforto also became the first Mets player to hit two home runs in a World Series game since Gary Carter in 1986. In between, Mets hometown rookie Matz held the Royals to two runs with two hits and five strikeouts without walks in five innings-plus. Mets manager Terry Collins then sent Clippard, his fifth pitcher of the night, out to start the eighth inning. Trailing, 3–2, the Royals drew consecutive one-out walks against Clippard, prompting manager Collins to call on closer Familia to try for a five-out save. Familia forced Eric Hosmer to tap a slow roller to the right side and Murphy charged in only to have the dribbler sneak under his glove and roll into right field, which allowed Ben Zobrist to score and Lorenzo Cain to reach third. On a 1-2 count, Mike Moustakas singled in the go-ahead run past the glove of a diving Murphy and Pérez drove in another insurance run. For second time in the Series, Familia failed to rescue Clippard and blew the save. Two of the three runs the Royals scored off Familia were charged to Clippard, who was credited with the loss. Previously, the usually reliable Familia failed to rescue Clippard and blew the save, as he had allowed Gordon's ninth-inning, tying homer in a Game 1 loss. Murphy, who still made every play look easy in the National League Championship Series and led the Mets to their first World Series since 2000 with seven homers in nine playoff games, has been silenced by Royals pitching. But he hit a one-out infield single in the ninth off Davis. Céspedes followed with another single, and Lucas Duda hit an easy liner to third baseman Moustakas, but Céspedes found himself way too far off first base, giving the Royals an easy double play and another incredible comeback. Ryan Madson pitched a perfect seventh for the win, and Davis worked two scoreless innings for his first save in the Series.

=== November ===
- November 1 – The Kansas City Royals captured the second World Series title in franchise history, with a 12-inning, 7–2 victory over the New York Mets in Game 5 at Citi Field. Once again, Kansas City came from behind to overcome a dominant start by Matt Harvey, who carried a 2–0 shutout through eight innings, then convinced Mets manager Terry Collins to let him remain in the game. As a result, the Royals rallied for a pair of runs in the ninth to tie it at 2–2 before the five-run explosion in the decisive 12th. Salvador Pérez, who hit .364 (8-for-22) in the Series, earned Most Valuable Player honors. Pérez also was involved in the tying run and started the five-run rally to put the game away. Edinson Vólquez returned from his father's funeral in the Dominican Republic in time to start the game for the Royals. When Vólquez was preparing to start Game 1 of the Series, his father Daniel died at age 63 and had been battling heart disease. Even though, Vólquez allowed just three runs on six hits in six innings of Kansas City's 5–4 victory in the opener. This time Vólquez gave up a leadoff home run to Curtis Granderson on his third pitch of the night. But he settled down and retired the next three batters, then faced the minimum nine batters over the next three frames thanks to a pair of double plays, holding the Mets' lead at 1–0 while Harvey dominated the Royals inning after inning. Vólquez kept his composure as the game moved to the sixth, when the Mets used a Granderson walk, a David Wright single and an error to load the bases with nobody out. But Vólquez limited the damage to one run, striking out Yoenis Céspedes and allowing a sacrifice fly RBI to Lucas Duda before retiring Travis d'Arnaud on a third base ground ball, keeping the Royals well within striking distance. Harvey took the mound for the ninth with his pitch count at 102 and the Mets leading 2–0. Up to that point, Harvey's line was four hits with nine strikeouts and one walk. Harvey proceeded to walk leadoff batter Lorenzo Cain, who subsequently stole second base and scored on an RBI double by Eric Hosmer. Mets manager Collins then summoned Jeurys Familia to close out the game, but with Hosmer at third base and one out, Pérez hit a soft ground ball to third, with the infield in, and Wright looked Hosmer back to third and threw to first for the out. But Hosmer bounced around third the whole play, waited for Wright to make the throw and he bolted for home. Duda took the throw for the second out but his relay to the plate was wide right, pulling d'Arnaud away from the play and allowing Hosmer to score the tying run. With both teams tied at 2–2, the game went into extras innings, and the Royals took control in the top of the 12th scoring five runs. Pérez started with a leadoff single off losing pitcher Addison Reed, while pinch-runner Jarrod Dyson stole second and moved to third on a grounder. Christian Colón then stepped in as a pinch-hitter for reliever Luke Hochevar. It was his first plate appearance since October 4, but he was able to hit a hard single to left field that brought home the tiebreaking run. After that, Paulo Orlando grounded into fielder's choice to second baseman Daniel Murphy, and was safe at second on a two bases error by Murphy. Alcides Escobar followed with a double that scored Colón and advanced Orlando to third. With Kansas City up 4–2, Ben Zobrist was intentionally walked and Bartolo Colón replaced Reed. Cain then hit a bases loaded double against Colón to push the score to 7–2. Hochevar was credited with the win and Wade Davis retired the last three outs of the Series. The Kansas City Royals are the first team since the 1989 Oakland Athletics to win the World Series a season after losing the World Series the previous year. They also are the first American League team since the 1961 New York Yankees to win a World Series a year after losing Game 7 of the World Series.
- November 2 – The Miami Marlins announced the hiring of Don Mattingly as their new manager. Mattingly will receive a four-year contract, becoming the eighth manager of the Marlins since the 2010 season. Mattingly will replace Dan Jennings, who made the unusual transition from general manager to field manager earlier this year after Mike Redmond was dismissed. Mattingly posted a 446–363 record and a winning record in each of his five seasons for the Los Angeles Dodgers from 2011 to 2015, guiding his club to the National League West Division title in each of the final three years of his term, a first in franchise history.
- November 3 – The Washington Nationals hire Dusty Baker as their new manager. A three-time National League Manager of the Year, Baker takes over from Matt Williams, who was dismissed in October after the regular season. The Nationals reportedly first offered the manager's job to Bud Black, but financial terms could not be agreed. Baker arrives in Washington after managing the San Francisco Giants (1993–2002), Chicago Cubs (2003–2006) and Cincinnati Reds (2008–2013), collecting a career record of 1,671–1,504 as part of his NL Pennant with San Francisco (2002) and the first divisional title in over a decade for Chicago (2003). To date, Baker is one of only three African Americans to manage a World Series team, joining Cito Gaston of the Toronto Blue Jays (1992–1993) and Ron Washington of the Texas Rangers (2010–2011).
- November 4 :
  - The New York Mets agreed to a two-year contract extension with manager Terry Collins, as he reportedly does not want to manage too much longer but was said to be open to continuing for at least the next two seasons. The 66-year-old Collins is an oft-mentioned National League Manager of the Year candidate after leading the Mets to a surprising 90-win season, en route to their first National League pennant in 15 years and World Series run, despite to dealt with a number of injuries early in the season plus questions as to when top prospects would be promoted. Collins has been managing the Mets since 2011, though the 2015 season marked his first winning campaign.
  - The Washington Nationals hired recently departed Texas Rangers pitching coach Mike Maddux to fill the same role in their organization under new manager Dusty Baker. Widely considered one of the game's more respected coaches of any discipline, Maddux could become the highest-paid pitching coach in the major leagues, according to a report.
  - The Cincinnati Reds promoted vice-president and assistant general manager Dick Williams to the general managerial role, while previous general manager Walt Jocketty will remain with the club as its president of baseball operations for one more year before moving into an advisory role. After 21 years as a general manager with the St. Louis Cardinals and Cincinnati, Jocketty wanted a less demanding role.
- November 12 :
  - Colby Rasmus made history when he became the first major league player ever to accept a qualifying offer. The 29-year-old Houston Astros outfielder will return to the team in 2016 on a one-year, $15.8 million contract, as Rasmus is the first big leaguer free agent to accept one qualifying offer since the system came in place three years ago. The next day, Baltimore Orioles catcher Matt Wieters agreed to accept the team's one-year offer.
  - The Los Angeles Angels of Anaheim agreed to acquire Gold Glove winner shortstop Andrelton Simmons from the Atlanta Braves, along with rookie catcher Jose Briceno. Pitchers Sean Newcomb and Chris Ellis are going to Atlanta in return, along with long-time Angels shortstop Erick Aybar. In addition, the Braves will pick up $2.5MM in the swap to offset some of Aybar's salary. Simmons also is under contract through 2020, whereas Aybar could become a free agent next postseason.
- November 13 – Los Angeles Dodgers pitcher Brett Anderson decided to accept his qualifying offer, meaning he will get a one-year, $15.8 million deal for 2016. Anderson joins Colby Rasmus and Matt Wieters in taking the qualifying offer, the first three players to do so since the system started. In the first three years of the current iteration of Major League Baseball's free-agent system, 34 players were made qualifying offers by their former teams. All 34 declined. This year, a record 20 players were made qualifying offers, a procedural move primarily designed to protect their former team's right to a compensatory draft pick.
- November 14 – The Boston Red Sox announced the acquisition of four-time, All-Star closer Craig Kimbrel from the San Diego Padres in return for prospects Manuel Margot, Javier Guerra, Carlos Asuaje and Logan Allen. In dealing Margot and Guerra, the Red Sox took advantage of two of the deeper positions in their minor league system. Boston assumed $25 million remaining on Kimbrel's contract, but have him under control for up to three more seasons.
- November 23 – The Los Angeles Dodgers hired Dave Roberts as their new manager. Roberts will succeed Don Mattingly, who mutually parted ways with the Dodgers last month after five years with the team. Roberts, whose father is an African-American former Marine and mother is a Japanese-American, becomes the first minority manager of the storied franchise that signed the first African-American player, Jackie Robinson. Roberts, 43, was born in Okinawa, Japan, where his father was stationed. A former Dodgers outfielder, Roberts played for the team from 2002 to 2004. He also played for the Cleveland Indians, Boston Red Sox, San Diego Padres and San Francisco Giants during a 10-year major league career that ended in 2008. Roberts is perhaps best known for his stolen base in the 2004 playoffs, which sparked a Red Sox eight-game winning streak that culminated with a World Series championship, its first in 86 years. The Dodgers announced that Roberts would officially be introduced at a news conference at Dodgers Stadium on December 1.

== 2015 in baseball results ==
=== Major League Baseball ===
- April 5 – October 4: 2015 Major League Baseball season
  - American League winners: (Missouri) Kansas City Royals
  - National League winners: (New York (state)) New York Mets
- June 8 – 10: First-year player draft, held at (New Jersey) Secaucus
  - #1 pick: (Georgia (U.S. state)) Dansby Swanson, selected by the Arizona Diamondbacks out of (Tennessee) Vanderbilt
- July 14: 86th All-Star Game, played at Great American Ball Park in (Ohio) Cincinnati
  - All-Star Game winners: American League
  - 30th Home Run Derby winner: (New Jersey) Todd Frazier, (Ohio) Cincinnati Reds infielder
- October 27 – November 1: 111th World Series
  - The (Missouri) Kansas City Royals defeated the (New York (state)) New York Mets in five games, to win the second World Series title in franchise history.

=== Little League World Series ===
- July 28 – August 30: 2015 Little League World Series Schedule for Baseball
  - July 28 – August 4: 2015 Big League World Series in (South Carolina) Easley at the Easley Recreation Complex
    - Team Latin America ( Guayama, Puerto Rico) defeated Team West ( Thousand Oaks, California), 3–1, in the final match.
  - August 2 – 8: 2015 Little League Intermediate World Series in (California) Livermore at the Max Baer Park
    - Team Asia-Pacific ( (South Korea) West Seoul Little League) defeated Team Southeast ( (Florida) Wellington Recreation Little League), 10–5, in the final match.
  - August 2 – 8: 2015 Senior League World Series in (Maine) Bangor at the Shawn T. Mansfield Stadium
    - Team US Southwest ( West University Place, Texas) defeated Team US Central ( Holmes County, Ohio), 8–1, in the final match.
  - August 16 – 23: 2015 Junior League World Series in (Michigan) Taylor at Heritage Park
    - Team Asia-Pacific ( (Chinese Taipei) Taichung) defeated Team USA Southeast ( Winchester, Virginia), 12–0, in the final match.
  - August 20 – 30: 2015 Little League World Series in South Williamsport at the Howard J. Lamade Stadium and Little League Volunteer Stadium
    - Team Japan Region ( Tokyo) defeated Team Mid-Atlantic Region ( Lewisberry, Pennsylvania), 18–11, in the final match.

=== International baseball ===
- February 2 – 8: 2015 Caribbean Series in (Puerto Rico) San Juan
  - (Cuba) Pinar del Río defeated (Mexico) Tomateros de Culiacán 3–2 in the final.
- June 2 – 7: European Cup "A" Qualifier Champions Cup in (France) Paris and (Netherlands) Rotterdam
  - Paris winner: (Italy) CNF Unipolsai Bologna
  - Rotterdam winner: (Netherlands) Curaçao Neptunus
  - August 6 – 9: 2015 European Champions Cup in (Italy) Bologna and (Netherlands) Rotterdam
    - Winner: (Netherlands) Curaçao Neptunus
- July 18 – 26: 2015 World Port tournament in Rotterdam
  - Cuba defeated the Netherlands, 5–3, to win their eighth World Port Tournament title. Curaçao took third place.
- July 24 – August 2: 2015 12U Baseball World Cup in Tainan
  - The United States defeated Chinese Taipei, 7–2, to win their second consecutive WBSC U-12 Baseball World Cup title. Nicaragua took the bronze medal.
- August 28 – September 6: 2015 18U Baseball World Cup in Osaka
  - The United States defeated Japan, 2–1, to win their third consecutive and eighth overall WBSC 18U Baseball World Cup title. South Korea took the bronze medal.
- November 8 – 21: 2015 WBSC Premier12 in (Chinese Taipei) Taipei, (Chinese Taipei) Taichung, Sapporo and Tokyo.
  - South Korea defeated the United States, 8–0, to win the inaugural WBSC Premier12 tournament. Japan won the bronze medal.

== Deaths ==
=== January ===
- January 1 – Mario Cuomo, 82, American politician, who previously played as a center fielder for the Pittsburgh's affiliate Brunswick Pirates in 1952, until being badly injured by a pitch in the back of the head which forced him to quit baseball.
- January 4 – Stu Miller, 87, two-time All-Star pitcher who spent 16 years in the majors with the St. Louis Cardinals, Philadelphia Phillies, New York/San Francisco Giants, Baltimore Orioles and Atlanta Braves, leading the National League in ERA in 1958, while gathering the most saves in the NL in 1961 and the American League in 1963 and earning a World Series ring with Baltimore in 1966. Committed a famous balk in the first game of the 1961 All-Star game.
- January 4 – Hank Peters, 90, Baltimore Orioles general manager from 1976 to 1987, and the architect of 1979 pennant-winners and 1983 world championship team, the most recent time Baltimore won the World Series; selected MLB Executive of the Year for both seasons; also played significant executive roles for Kansas City Athletics and Cleveland Indians (where he was club president from 1988 to 1991), and was president of Minor League Baseball (1972–1975).
- January 7 – Herb Simpson, 94, first baseman/outfielder and the last known living member of the Seattle Steelheads of the Negro Baseball League, who also became the first black player to integrate two different minor league circuits, starring for the Spokane Indians (INTL) and the Albuquerque Dukes (TNML).
- January 9 – Chuck Locke, 82, pitcher on the 1955 Baltimore Orioles.
- January 10 – Renae Youngberg, 81, infielder who played for four clubs of the All-American Girls Professional Baseball League between 1949 and 1953, including the Grand Rapids Chicks squad that won the league's title in 1953.
- January 12 – Carl Long, 79, Negro leagues outfielder and one of the first players who broke the color barrier in the minor leagues.
- January 18 – Yasuaki Taiho, 51, Taiwanese first baseman and outfielder in Nippon Professional Baseball, who played from 1989 through 2002 for the Hanshin Tigers and Chunichi Dragons, earning the Best Nine Award in the 1994 season.
- January 22 – Don Bryant, 73, catcher for the Chicago Cubs and the Houston Astros in part of three seasons spanning 1966–1970, who caught Don Wilson's second career no-hitter in 1969; later coached for the Boston Red Sox from 1974 to 1976 and Seattle Mariners from 1977 to 1980.
- January 23 – Ernie Banks, 83, Hall-of-Famer who played with the Chicago Cubs from 1953 to 1971, first African-American in Chicago Cub history, 14-time All-Star, National League Most Valuable Player in 1958 and 1959, member of the 500-home run club; his number 14 was the first to be retired by the Cubs.
- January 23 – Nick Koback, 79, catcher who played with the Pittsburgh Pirates from 1953 to 1955.
- January 23 – Frank Sims, 93, broadcaster for the Phillies, Tigers, Dodgers, Angels and Padres.
- January 25 – Margaret Berger, 92, founding member of the All-American Girls Professional Baseball League and an All-Star pitcher in 1943.
- January 25 – Bill Monbouquette, 78, four-time All-Star pitcher who spent 11 seasons spanning 1958–1968 with the Boston Red Sox, Detroit Tigers, New York Yankees and San Francisco Giants, winning 114 games, including a no-hitter in 1962; later a longtime pitching instructor, including MLB stints with New York Mets (1982–1983) and Yankees (1985–1986).
- January 27 – Rocky Bridges, 87, All-Star third baseman and middle infielder whose 11-year major league career for seven teams from 1951 through 1961 was bookended by seasons with the Brooklyn Dodgers and the expansion Los Angeles Angels; coached for Angels and San Francisco Giants; won more than 1,300 games as a minor league manager in 21 seasons between 1964 and 1989.
- January 27 – Al Severinsen, 70, who posted a 3–7 record with nine saves and a 3.08 ERA in 88 relief appearances for the Baltimore Orioles and San Diego Padres in three seasons from 1969 to 1972, also a member of the Baltimore team who lost the 1969 World Series to the New York Mets in five games.
- January 27 – Charlie Williams, 67, relief pitcher and spot starter for the New York Mets and San Francisco Giants from 1971 through 1978, who is best known for being the player the Mets sent to the Giants in exchange for future Hall of Famer Willie Mays.

=== February ===
- February 2 – Dave Bergman, 61, first baseman, designated hitter and outfielder for the New York Yankees, Houston Astros, San Francisco Giants and Detroit Tigers over a 17-year career between 1975 and 1992, being also a member of the Tigers' World Series championship team in 1984.
- February 5 – Windy McCall, 89, relief pitcher for the Boston Red Sox, Pittsburgh Pirates and New York Giants in parts of seven seasons from 1948 to 1957.
- February 10 – Don Johnson, 88, pitcher whose career spanned seven years with the New York Yankees, Chicago White Sox, Washington Senators, Baltimore Orioles and San Francisco Giants, pitching also for the Toronto Maple Leafs of the International League, where he led the circuit with a 2.67 ERA and 156 strikeouts in 1953, and in 1957 was named the league's Most Valuable Player.
- February 11 – Ray Hathaway, 98, pitcher for the 1945 Brooklyn Dodgers, who also managed more than 3,000 minor league games from 1947 to 1973, finishing with 1,638 wins and five MiLB Championships.
- February 12 – Alison Gordon, 72, Canadian journalist and novelist, who became the major league's first full-time female sportswriter while covering the Toronto Blue Jays for the Toronto Star from 1979 to 1984.
- February 15 – Wendell Kim, 64, minor league player and manager as well as the first Korean-American to wear a major league uniform; coached for the San Francisco Giants, Boston Red Sox, Montreal Expos and Chicago Cubs over 15 seasons spanning 1989 through 2004.
- February 18 – Billy Ott, 74, outfielder for the Chicago Cubs in parts of two seasons from 1962 to 1964.
- February 19 – Gary Woods, 60, backup outfielder for the Oakland Athletics, Toronto Blue Jays, Houston Astros and Chicago Cubs during eight seasons spanning 1976–1985.
- February 23 – Jim King, 82, outfielder who spent 18 years in baseball, ten of them in the major leagues with the Chicago Cubs, St. Louis Cardinals, San Francisco Giants, Washington Senators, Chicago White Sox and Cleveland Indians, batting .240 with 117 home runs and 401 RBI in 1,125 games.
- February 28 – Alex Johnson, 72, All-Star outfielder who had stints with eight teams in 13 seasons from 1964 to 1976, winning the 1970 American League batting title by one of the closest margins in history, edging Carl Yastrzemski .3289 to .3286 with a pair of hits on the final day of the season.

=== March ===
- March 1 – Jeff McKnight, 52, utility man who played from 1989 through 1994 with the New York Mets and Baltimore Orioles, while playing in all positions except center field and pitcher.
- March 1 – Minnie Miñoso, 89, Cuban American left fielder nicknamed "Mr. White Sox"; a nine-time All-Star and three-time Gold Glove Award winner, while posting four top-five American League MVP finishes, who became the first black MLB player to join a Chicago team and has been considered one of the greats in Chicago White Sox history.
- March 4 – Steve Shea, 72, relief pitcher who played for the 1968 Houston Astros and with the expansion Montreal Expos in 1969.
- March 5 – John R. Keennan, 74, who spent 37 years scouting for the Los Angeles Dodgers and was instrumental in the signing of Don Sutton, Davey Lopes, Bill Russell, Mickey Hatcher, Rick Sutcliffe and Mitch Webster, among many others.
- March 12 – Bob Anderson, 79, a reliable workhorse pitcher who played for the Chicago Cubs from 1957 through 1962 and the Detroit Tigers in 1963, ending with a seven-year career record of 36-46 and a 4.39 ERA in 246 appearances as starter or reliever.
- March 13 – Al Rosen, 91, four-time All-Star third baseman who played his entire 10-season career with the Cleveland Indians from 1947 through 1956; a member on the Indians' 1948 title team, the last Cleveland squad to win the World Series, who led the American League in home runs and RBI twice and was also voted unanimously the AL Most Valuable Player in 1953, becoming the first player since Hank Greenberg in 1935 to receive all first-place MVP votes, while batting .336 with 43 home runs and 145 RBI and nearly winning the Triple Crown, being beaten out in for the batting title by Washington Senators' Mickey Vernon, who hit .337.
- March 20 – Daniel Donahue, 91, Atlanta Braves co-owner and president from 1973 until 1975.
- March 20 – Harley Hisner, 88, pitcher who played briefly for the Boston Red Sox at the end of the 1951 season.
- March 23 – Nick Peters, 75, Hall of Fame journalist and baseball writer who covered all of the San Francisco Giants home openers from 1958 through 2008 and authored five books on the team.
- March 25 – Bill Slayback, 67, pitcher for the Detroit Tigers from 1972 to 1974, who is best known for co-writing with Tigers broadcaster Ernie Harwell and performing the song "Move Over Babe" (Here Comes Henry), a tribute to Hank Aaron's chase of the 39-year-old major league record set by Babe Ruth.
- March 28 – Chuck Brayton, 89, College Baseball Hall of Fame head coach who had 1,162 career wins with the Washington State Cougars in 33 seasons from 1962 to 1994, while leading Cougar teams won 21 conference titles, including 11 in a row from 1970 to 1980, and guiding them to the College World Series titles in 1965 and 1976.
- March 28 – Dick Mills, 70, pitcher who played briefly for the Boston Red Sox in 1970.
- March 28 – Víctor Sánchez, 20, one of the Seattle Mariners' top pitching prospects, who died from head injuries sustained in a boating accident in his Venezuela homeland six weeks before.
- March 31 – Riccardo Ingram, 48, outfielder for the Detroit Tigers and Minnesota Twins from 1994 to 1995, who also spent more than 20 years in the minor leagues with stints as a player, manager and coach.

=== April ===
- April 5 – Lon Simmons, 91, Baseball Hall of Fame broadcaster whose career spanned five decades calling San Francisco Giants and Oakland Athletics games, as well as for the NFL's San Francisco 49ers.
- April 7 – José Capellán, 34, Dominican Republic reliever who pitched from 2004 through 2008 with the Atlanta Braves, Milwaukee Brewers, Detroit Tigers and Colorado Rockies.
- April 10 – Bobby Moore, 58, pitcher who played for the San Francisco Giants during the 1985 season.
- April 11 – Harry Warner, 86, member of the coaching staff of the Toronto Blue Jays from 1977 to 1980 and the Milwaukee Brewers from 1981 to 1982; former longtime minor-league outfielder and manager.
- April 16 – Ollie Brown, 71, strong-armed right fielder in a 13-season career which included stints for six clubs, especially the San Diego Padres, who tabbed him with the first pick in the 1968 MLB expansion draft conducted to stock up the rosters of four expansion teams.
- April 23 – Dick Barone, 82, infielder for the 1960 Pittsburgh Pirates.
- April 25 – Jim Fanning, 87, catcher, manager and executive who served for the Montreal Expos for almost 25 years, including as their first-ever general manager in 1968 and field manager in 1981, when he guided the Expos to their only postseason berth in the franchise's history.
- April 26 – Bill Valentine, 82, who at 18 became the youngest professional umpire in professional baseball history and later umpired in the American League from 1963 through 1968, including the 1965 MLB All-Star Game; known as the first umpire to eject Mickey Mantle for arguing a called third strike in September 1964, and for working behind the plate when 59-year-old Satchel Paige pitched his final game in September 1965, and when Boston Red Sox outfielder Tony Conigliaro suffered a near-fatal beaning in August 1967; fired by AL president Joe Cronin in September 1968 for union organizing, he stayed in baseball as the longtime chief executive of the Arkansas Travelers of the Double-A Texas League.

=== May ===
- May 2 – Bob Schmidt, 82, catcher for four teams in a span of 7 seasons from 1958 to 1965, who made the National League All-Star team in his rookie season.
- May 10 – Jerry Dior, 82, designer of the current Major League Baseball logo.
- May 11 – Kay Heim, 97, Canadian female catcher and one of the original 60 founding members of the All-American Girls Professional League in its 1943 inaugural season, who later earned recognitions in several Hall of Fames through the rest of her life.
- May 13 – Earl Averill Jr., 83, catcher for the Cleveland Indians, Chicago Cubs, Chicago White Sox, Los Angeles Angels and Philadelphia Phillies in a span of seven seasons from 1956 to 1963, who in 1962 tied a major league record by reaching base in 17 consecutive at-bats, a feat shared with Piggy Ward, who set that mark in the 1893 season.
- May 21 – Fred Gladding, 78, relief pitcher who played for the Detroit Tigers and the Houston Astros in 13 seasons spanning 1961–1973, posting a 48–34 record with a 3.13 ERA and 109 saves in 450 games, while leading the National League with 29 saves in 1969, the first season the statistic was officially recognized.
- May 21 – Ellen Tronnier, 87, All-American Girls Professional Baseball League outfielder, and one of its founding members.
- May 22 – Alan Koch, 77, pitcher for the Detroit Tigers and Washington Senators in 1963 and 1964.
- May 28 – Skeeter Kell, 85, second baseman who played briefly for the Philadelphia Athletics in its 1952 season and brother of Hall of Famer George Kell.
- May 30 – Lennie Merullo, 98, shortstop for the Chicago Cubs during seven seasons from 1941 to 1947, who was the last remaining Cubs player to have appeared in the 1945 World Series.

=== June ===
- June 9 – Larry Eschen, 94, shortstop who played for the Philadelphia Athletics during the 1942 season.
- June 12 – Andrés Mora, 60, Mexican outfielder who played for the Baltimore Orioles and Cleveland Indians in part of three seasons spanning 1976–1980, as well as one of the most prolific sluggers in Mexican baseball history, while hitting 419 home runs in the Mexican League, 148 in the Mexican Pacific League, 27 in the major leagues, and 21 more in the minors, amassing a career total of 615 homers.
- June 17 – Nelson Doubleday Jr., 81, publisher and New York Mets' majority owner (1980–2002) who spurred the renaissance of the franchise, guiding the Mets to the 1986 World Series championship, the 2000 N.L. pennant and the 1988 N.L. East Division title.
- June 19 – Len Matarazzo, 86, pitcher who played briefly for the Philadelphia Athletics during the 1952 season.
- June 21 – Darryl Hamilton, 50, standout center fielder for the Milwaukee Brewers, Texas Rangers, San Francisco Giants, Colorado Rockies and New York Mets between 1988 and 2001, and later an MLB Network analyst since 2013, who was shot several times in a murder-suicide in Houston.
- June 26 – Kal Segrist, 84, utility infielder for the New York Yankees and Baltimore Orioles in a span of two seasons from 1952 to 1955, who later became Texas Tech's second-longest tenured baseball coach in program history and a Hall of Honor member, while guiding the Red Raiders for 16 seasons where he set a record of 317 victories from 1968 to 1983, which now remain second all-time in Texas Tech baseball history.

=== July ===
- July 12 – Mahlon Duckett, 92, Negro leagues second baseman and the last surviving member of the Philadelphia Stars club, which went on to win the NNL Championship in 1934.
- July 12 – Buddy Lively, 90, fireball pitcher for the Cincinnati Reds from 1947 through 1949, and a World War II veteran who previously served in an anti-aircraft battalion part of General George S. Patton's Third Army, fighting in France and Belgium.
- July 19 – Rugger Ardizoia, 95, Italian-born pitcher in one game for the 1947 New York Yankees, who spent much of his 12-year career in the Pacific Coast League, including stints with the Hollywood Stars, Mission Reds, Oakland Oaks and Seattle Rainiers.
- July 22 – Marilyn Jones, 88, All-American Girls Professional Baseball League pitcher and catcher for six teams in six seasons from 1948 to 1953, who also was a member of the 1950 Rockford Peaches AAGPBL champions, and hurled a no-hitter in 1952.
- July 24 – Walter Lee Gibbons, 86, hard throwing pitcher who split his career between the Negro leagues and the minor leagues.
- July 31 – Charles 'Buzz' Bowers, 86, longtime Boston Red Sox talent scout and a member of several Halls of Fame.
- July 31 – Billy Pierce, 88, blazing left-handed pitcher in 18 major league seasons, 13 of them with the Chicago White Sox; a seven-time All-Star and two-time 20-game winner in an era dominated by the power-hitting New York Yankees, who led the American League with 186 strikeouts in 1953 and a 1.97 earned run average in 1955, as well as in complete games from 1956 through 1958, while amassing 211 wins, 38 shutouts, 1,999 strikeouts, and 193 complete games in 3,306 2/3 innings of work.

=== August ===
- August 1 – Hank Izquierdo, 84, Cuban reserve catcher for the Minnesota Twins in 1967, who also spent 25 years in the minor leagues as a player-coach and manager, and went out scouting later for the Twins and the Chicago Cubs.
- August 2 – Jack Spring, 82, pitcher who played with seven teams in a span of eight seasons, most prominently for the expansion Los Angeles Angels from 1961 through 1964.
- August 4 – Irvin Castille, 89, Negro American League infielder who played from 1951 to 1953 for the Birmingham Black Barons.
- August 15 – Doc Daugherty, 87, whose major league career consisted of but a single appearance as a pinch hitter for the Detroit Tigers in 1951, to become one of about 400 big leaguers since 1900 whose moment of glory lasted only a day.
- August 15 – Bud Thomas, 86, shortstop who played briefly for the 1951 St. Louis Browns, hitting .350 (7-for-20) in 14 games, while handling 30 chances without an error.

=== September ===
- September 5 – Gene Elston, 93, Ford Frick Award winner who had broadcast Houston Colt .45s and Astros games on radio and television from 1962 through 1986.
- September 6 – Barney Schultz, 89, right-handed relief specialist during an 11-year career that spanned from 1955 to 1965, who posted a 1.64 ERA and 14 saves for the St. Louis Cardinals in 1964 when they rallied in September to win the National League pennant, a streak that culminated in a World Series title over the storied New York Yankees.
- September 8 – Joaquín Andújar, 62, four-time All-Star Dominican Republic pitcher, a two-time 20-game winner over the course of a 13-year career from 1976 through 1988 that featured stops with the Houston Astros, St. Louis Cardinals and Oakland Athletics, while helping the Cardinals win the 1982 World Series.
- September 12 – Alex Monchak, 98, the third oldest living big leaguer at the time of his death, who played at shortstop in 19 games for the Philadelphia Phillies in 1940, went off to World War II and never returned to play in the majors, yet from 1949 to 1957 built a tidy little career for himself as a player/manager in the minors winning four pennants. After that, Monchak worked as a coach for Chuck Tanner when he managed the Chicago White Sox, Oakland Athletics, Pittsburgh Pirates and Atlanta Braves from 1970 through 1988, including the 1979 World Series champion Pirates.
- September 13 – Erma Bergmann, 91, All-American Girls Professional Baseball League pitcher and member of several Halls of Fame, who played from 1944 to 1951 with the Muskegon Lassies, Springfield Sallies, Racine Belles and Battle Creek Belles, and also hurled a no-hitter in 1947.
- September 13 – Jane Jacobs, 91, All-American Girls Professional Baseball League pitcher who played from 1944 through 1946 for the Racine Belles and Peoria Redwings.
- September 15 – Randy Wiles, 64, pitcher who played briefly for the Chicago White Sox in the 1977 season.
- September 17 – Bobby Etheridge, 73, third baseman for the San Francisco Giants in part of two seasons spanning 1967–1969.
- September 17 – Milo Hamilton, 88, play-by-play announcer and Ford Frick Award winner best known for his call of Hank Aaron's record-breaking 715th career home run to pass Babe Ruth, whose 59-year broadcasting career is the second longest in major league history behind Los Angeles Dodgers announcer Vin Scully, as he worked from 1953 through 1984 for six different clubs before spending 28 years broadcasting Houston Astros games until his retirement in 2012.
- September 19 – Walter Young, 35, first baseman for the 2005 Baltimore Orioles.
- September 22 – Yogi Berra, 90, Hall of Fame catcher, manager and coach, who spent 44 major league seasons with the New York Yankees (29), New York Mets (11) and Houston Astros (4), earning three American League MVP awards, 13 World Series rings and 15 straight All-Star Game appearances, while collecting a career slash line of .285/.348/.482 with 358 home runs and 1430 RBI in 2120 games, and a 484-444 managerial record with pennant titles in both leagues.
- September 24 – Ed Sukla, 72, middle relief pitcher who posted a 3–5 record with a 5.26 ERA and four saves in 39 games for the Los Angeles/California Angels from 1964 to 1966, also known as the first Angels pitcher to win a game at a newly opened Anaheim Stadium.
- September 25 – Tom Kelley, 71, pitcher who played for the Cleveland Indians and Atlanta Braves in parts of seven seasons spanning 1964–1973, totaling a 20–22 record with a 3.75 ERA in 104 appearances.
- September 28 – Carlos Diaz, 57, relief pitcher who pitched for the Atlanta Braves, New York Mets and Los Angeles Dodgers from 1982 to 1986.

=== October ===
- October 1 – Cal Neeman, 86, light hitting, good defensive catcher who spent seven seasons from 1957 to 1963 for the Chicago Cubs, Philadelphia Phillies, Pittsburgh Pirates and Washington Senators, while leading all National League catchers in double plays and putouts as a Cubs rookie in 1957.
- October 2 – Harold Schacker, 90, pitcher for the Boston Braves during the 1945 season; one of several major leaguers who only played during World War II conflict, as well as the oldest living Jewish big leaguer.
- October 10 – Garry Hancock, 61, reserve outfielder and first baseman who played for the Boston Red Sox and Oakland Athletics in parts of six seasons spanning 1978–1984.
- October 11 – Dean Chance, 74, two-time All-Star pitcher and member of the inaugural Los Angeles Angels in 1961, who is best remembered for his outstanding 1964 season that saw him win the Cy Young Award (just when one was awarded for all of baseball), after leading the American League with 20 wins, a 1.65 ERA, 278 1/3 innings, 15 complete games and 11 shutouts, and also for throwing a no-hitter and winning 20 games for the Minnesota Twins in 1967.
- October 15 – Neill Sheridan, 93, classic cup of coffee big leaguer who saw brief duty in just two games as a pinch hitter and pinch runner with the 1948 Boston Red Sox in 1948, whose 12-year baseball career spanned across several teams of the Pacific Coast League, and was a World War II veteran who had just turned 20 at the time of the attack on Pearl Harbor.
- October 17 – Lois Bellman, 89, infield/outfield utility who played for the Chicago Colleens of the All-American Girls Professional Baseball League in its 1949 season.
- October 21 – Rhoda Leonard, 87, All-American Girls Professional Baseball League infielder/outfielder for the 1946 Fort Wayne Daisies.
- October 21 – Jim Robertson, 87, catcher for the Philadelphia/Kansas City Athletics from 1954 to 1955.
- October 22 – John Tsitouris, 79, middle-relief pitcher who played for the Detroit Tigers, Kansas City Athletics and Cincinnati Reds in a span of eleven years from 1957 to 1968.
- October 30 – Norm Siebern, 82, three-time All-Star first baseman/outfielder and member of the 1956 and 1958 New York Yankees World Series Champion teams, who also spent part of his 12-year major league career with the Kansas City Athletics, Baltimore Orioles, California Angels, San Francisco Giants and Boston Red Sox, while hitting a .272/.369/.423 slash line with 132 home runs and 636 RBI in 1,406 games appearances.

=== November ===
- November 2 – Eddie Milner, 60, speedy center fielder for the Cincinnati Reds in the 1980s, who made a name for himself for his fine defensive skills and daring path on the bases.
- November 7 – Fred Besana, 84, relief pitcher for the 1956 Baltimore Orioles, who was better known for his confrontations against future Hall of Fame members, as he walked Mickey Mantle and gave up a single to Yogi Berra in a regular season game, struck out Willie McCovey with the bases loaded in the 1959 Pacific Coast League All-Star Game, and went toe-to-toe against Ernie Banks in a spring training game.
- November 9 – Tommy Hanson, 29, starting pitcher who posted a 45–32 record with a 3.61 ERA in four seasons for the Atlanta Braves, who played a key role in helping the 2010 team return to the postseason for the first time since 2005.
- November 9 – Ruth Kramer, 89, All-American Girls Professional Baseball League player.
- November 10 – Walter McCoy, 92, pitcher who played for the Chicago American Giants and Kansas City Monarchs of the Negro leagues in a four-season span from 1945 to 1948.
- November 15 – Carmelo Castillo, 57, Dominican Republic right fielder whose career spanned ten seasons, seven for the Cleveland Indians (1982–1988) and three with the Minnesota Twins (1989–1991).
- November 15 – George Genovese, 93, top-notch talent scout for the San Francisco Giants and Los Angeles Dodgers who signed approximately 40 future big leaguers, including such Southern California standouts as Bobby Bonds, Jack Clark, Royce Clayton, Chili Davis, Rob Deer, George Foster, Dave Kingman, Gary Matthews, Randy Moffitt, Matt Nokes, and Matt Williams.
- November 19 – Jim Stump, 83, relief pitcher and Korean War veteran, who posted a 1–0 record with a 2.02 ERA for the Detroit Tigers in part of two seasons spanning 1957–1959, while compiling an overall record of 91–86 with a 3.66 ERA in 287 minor league games between 1951 and 1961.
- November 21 – Kerry Dineen, 63, backup outfielder who played for the New York Yankees and Philadelphia Phillies in parts of the seasons spanning 1975–1978.
- November 21 – Ken Johnson, 82, starting pitcher for the Kansas City Athletics, Cincinnati Reds, Houston Colt .45/Astros, Milwaukee/Atlanta Braves, New York Yankees, Chicago Cubs and Montreal Expos in a span of 13 seasons from 1958 to 1970, who became the first and so far only pitcher in major league history to lose a complete game, nine-inning no-hitter.
- November 23 – Willie Royster, 61, catcher for the 1981 Baltimore Orioles, who also spent 13 seasons in the minors himself, playing from 1972 to 1983 in the Orioles, Pirates and Tigers systems.
- November 24 – Bobby Smith, 81, backup outfielder for the St. Louis Cardinals, Philadelphia Phillies, New York Mets, Chicago Cubs and Los Angeles Angels in parts of seven seasons spanning 1957–1965.
- November 27 – Lou Marone, 69, relief pitcher for the Pittsburgh Pirates from 1969 to 1970.
- November 29 – Ramón de los Santos, 66, Dominican Republic relief pitcher for the 1974 Houston Astros.
- November 30 – Bob Dustal, 80, pitcher who played briefly for the Detroit Tigers in the 1963 season.

=== December ===
- December 2 – Bob Martyn, 85, backup outfielder for the Kansas City Athletics from 1957 to 1959.
- December 8 – Gustavo Gil, 76, Venezuelan slick infielder and founding member of the 1969 Seattle Pilots, who also had stints with the Cleveland Indians and the Milwaukee Brewers.
- December 13 – Phil Pepe, 80, baseball writer and radio voice personality.
- December 16 – Jim McAnany, 79, right fielder for the Chicago White Sox and Cubs from 1958 through 1952, as well as a member of the White Sox's 1959 World Series team.
- December 17 – Hal Brown, 91, knuckleballer who pitched from 1951 through 1964 for the Chicago White Sox, Boston Red Sox, Baltimore Orioles, New York Yankees and Houston Colt .45s.
- December 18 – Evelio Hernández, 84, Cuban pitcher for the Washington Senators in the 1956 and 1957 seasons, who also spent 11 years in the minors and hurled a no-hitter in the Mexican League in 1966.
- December 20 – George Burpo, 93, pitcher for the 1946 Cincinnati Reds, as well as a decorated soldier for his three years in World War II.
- December 26 – Bobby Dews, 76, who spent 53 years in baseball, including the final 37 with the Atlanta Braves, where he filled a variety of roles with the organization.
- December 26 – Jim O'Toole, 78, All-Star pitcher who spent nine of his 10 major league seasons with the Cincinnati Reds, anchoring their pitching staff and winning 16 games over four straight seasons from 1961 to 1964, while posting a career-high 19 wins for the 1961 National League champion Reds, and collecting an overall record of 98–84 with a 3.57 ERA in 270 games.
- December 27 – Dave Henderson, 57, All-Star outfielder who spent 14 seasons in the major leagues, whose ninth-inning, two-out, two-strike home run lifted the Boston Red Sox to a Game 5 victory over the California Angels in the 1986 American League Championship Series, and played on the Oakland Athletics' last World Series championship team in 1989.
- December 29 – Frank Malzone, 85, six-time All-Star third baseman and three-time Gold Glove Award winner, who hit 131 home runs with 716 RBI for the Boston Red Sox in a span of 11 seasons from 1955 to 1965, the most of any third baseman in club history.
- December 29 – Ed Mayer, 84, pitcher for the Chicago Cubs in parts of two seasons spanning 1957–1958.
- December 31 – Vern Rapp, 87, who managed the St. Louis Cardinals from 1977 to 1978 and the Cincinnati Reds in 1984.
