= The Sporting News MLB Executive of the Year Award =

Major League Baseball annual award

Executive of the Year Award
- Sport: Baseball
- League: Major League Baseball
- Awarded for: Outstanding executive, as selected by Sporting News
- Presented by: The Sporting News

History
- First award: 1936
- Most wins: George Weiss (4)
- Most recent: Erik Neander (2026)

The Sporting News Executive of the Year Award was established in 1936 and is given annually to one executive, including general managers, in Major League Baseball (MLB). The presenting company is The Sporting News, formerly known as Sporting News from 2002 to 2022. Listed below in chronological order are the baseball executives chosen as recipients of the award.

The first recipient of the award was Branch Rickey, who went on to win the award a total of three times, twice with the St. Louis Cardinals and once with the Brooklyn Dodgers. George Weiss, who had a long and fruitful career as an executive with the New York Yankees, has the most wins, four, with three of them coming consecutively in 1950–1952. The most recent repeat winner of the award is Billy Beane, who won the award in 1999, 2012, and 2018, all with the Oakland Athletics. Executives with the Yankees of the American League have won the award eight times, more than any other team. In the National League, the St. Louis Cardinals have the most wins, with seven. There has been one instance of the award being presented to an MLB executive rather than a team executive; Lee MacPhail in 1966.

== Key ==
**Year**	Links to an article about the corresponding MLB season
**Player (X)**	Denotes winning executive and number of times they had won the award at that point (if more than one)
**Bold**	The winning executive's team won the World Series that same year
^	Indicates multiple award winners in the same year
†	Member of the Baseball Hall of Fame as an executive

== Award winners ==
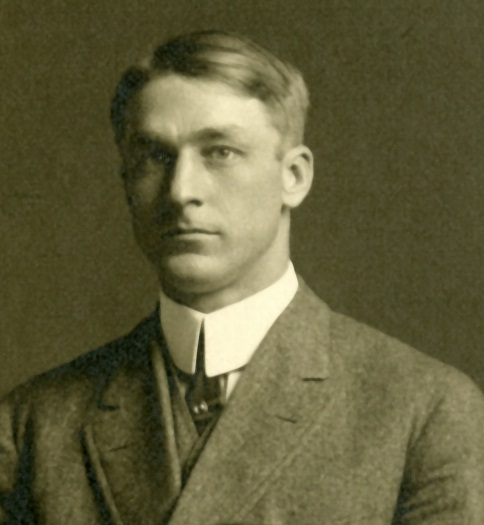
Branch Rickey

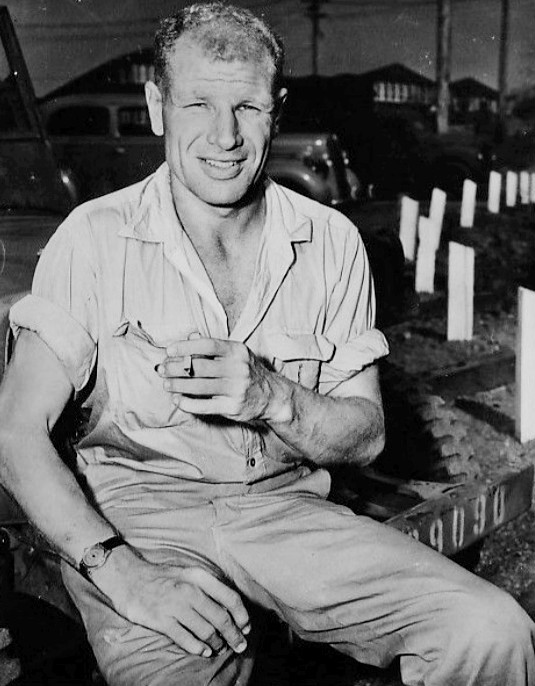
Bill Veeck

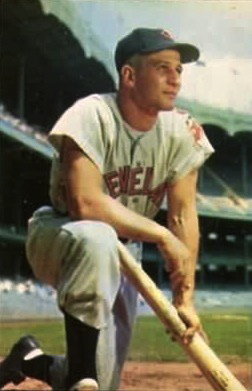
Al Rosen

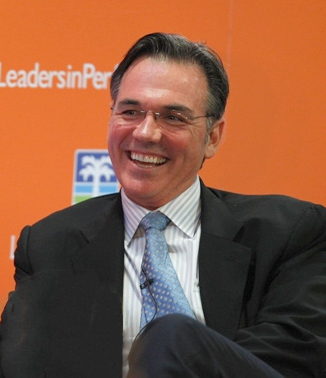
Billy Beane

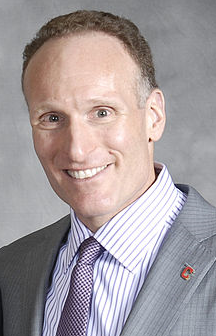
Mark Shapiro

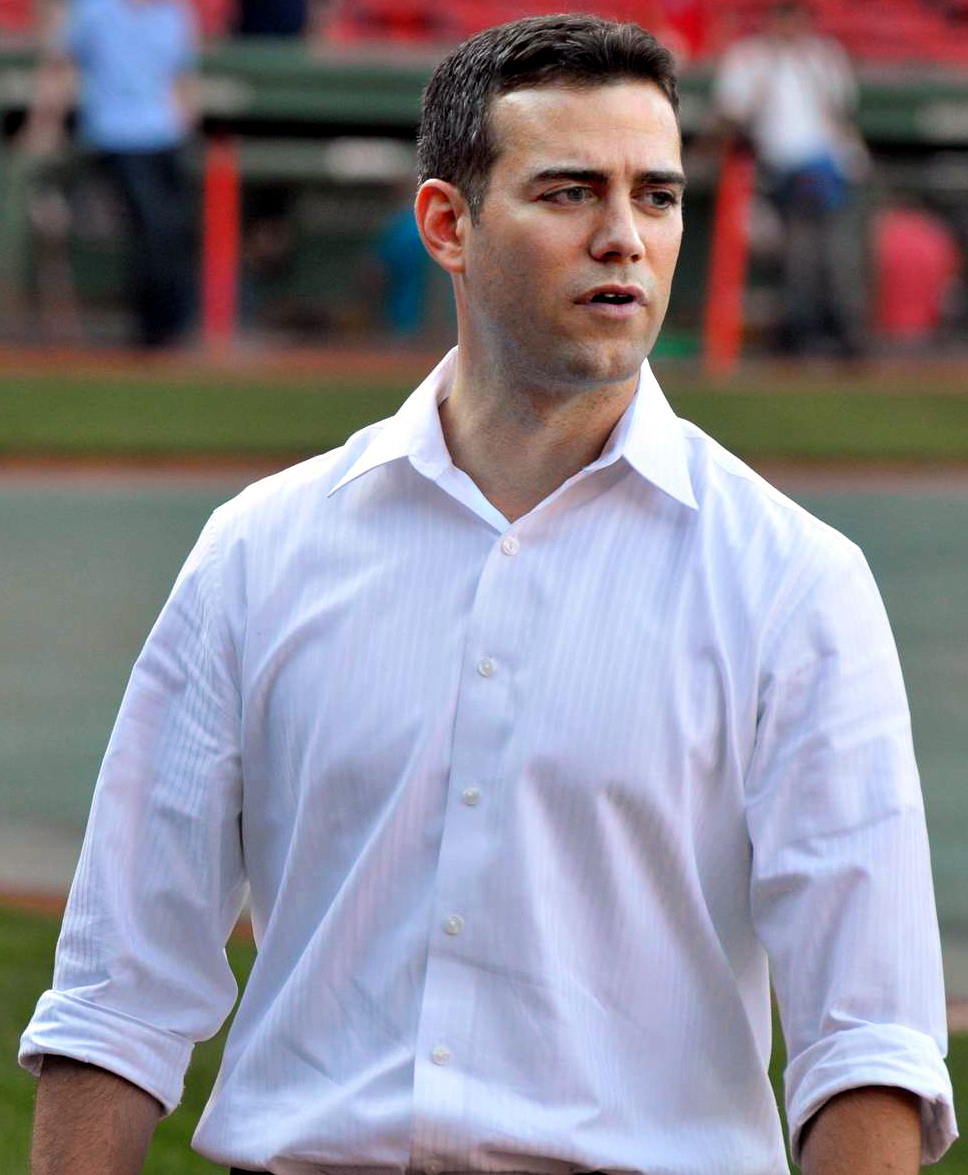
Theo Epstein

Year	Name	Team	League	Ref
1936	Branch Rickey (1)^{†}	St. Louis Cardinals	National	
1937	Ed Barrow (1)^{†}	**New York Yankees**	American	
1938	Warren Giles^{†}	Cincinnati Reds	National	
1939	Larry MacPhail^{†}	Brooklyn Dodgers	National	
1940	Walter Briggs Sr.	Detroit Tigers	American	
1941	Ed Barrow (2)^{†}	**New York Yankees**	American	
1942	Branch Rickey (2)^{†}	**St. Louis Cardinals**	National	
1943	Clark Griffith^{†}	Washington Senators	American	
1944	Bill DeWitt	St. Louis Browns	American	
1945	Phil Wrigley	Chicago Cubs	National	
1946	Tom Yawkey^{†}	Boston Red Sox	American	
1947	Branch Rickey (3)^{†}	Brooklyn Dodgers	National	
1948	Bill Veeck (1)^{†}	**Cleveland Indians**	American	
1949	Bob Carpenter	Philadelphia Phillies	National	
1950	George Weiss (1)^{†}	**New York Yankees**	American	
1951	George Weiss (2)^{†}	**New York Yankees**	American	
1952	George Weiss (3)^{†}	**New York Yankees**	American	
1953	Lou Perini	Milwaukee Braves	National	
1954	Horace Stoneham	**New York Giants**	National	
1955	Walter O'Malley^{†}	**Brooklyn Dodgers**	National	
1956	Gabe Paul (1)	Cincinnati Redlegs	National	
1957	Frank Lane	St. Louis Cardinals	National	
1958	Joe L. Brown	Pittsburgh Pirates	National	
1959	Buzzie Bavasi	**Los Angeles Dodgers**	National	
1960	George Weiss (4)^{†}	New York Yankees	American	
1961	Dan Topping	**New York Yankees**	American	
1962	Fred Haney	Los Angeles Angels	American	
1963	Bing Devine (1)	St. Louis Cardinals	National	
1964	Bing Devine (2)	**St. Louis Cardinals**	National	
1965	Calvin Griffith	Minnesota Twins	American	
1966	Lee MacPhail^{†}	MLB Chief Assistant	—	
1967	Dick O'Connell (1)	Boston Red Sox	American	
1968	Jim Campbell	**Detroit Tigers**	American	
1969	Johnny Murphy	**New York Mets**	National	
1970	Harry Dalton (1)	**Baltimore Orioles**	American	
1971	Cedric Tallis	Kansas City Royals	American	
1972	Roland Hemond (1)	Chicago White Sox	American	
1973	Bob Howsam	Cincinnati Reds	National	
1974	Gabe Paul (2)	New York Yankees	American	
1975	Dick O'Connell (2)	Boston Red Sox	American	
1976	Joe Burke	Kansas City Royals	American	
1977	Bill Veeck (2)^{†}	Chicago White Sox	American	
1978	Spec Richardson	San Francisco Giants	National	
1979	Hank Peters (1)	Baltimore Orioles	American	
1980	Tal Smith	Houston Astros	National	
1981	John McHale	Montreal Expos	National	
1982	Harry Dalton (2)	Milwaukee Brewers	American	
1983	Hank Peters (2)	**Baltimore Orioles**	American	
1984	Dallas Green	Chicago Cubs	National	
1985	John Schuerholz^{†}	**Kansas City Royals**	American	
1986	Frank Cashen	**New York Mets**	National	
1987	Al Rosen	San Francisco Giants	National	
1988	Fred Claire	**Los Angeles Dodgers**	National	
1989	Roland Hemond (2)	Baltimore Orioles	American	
1990	Bob Quinn	**Cincinnati Reds**	National	
1991	Andy MacPhail	**Minnesota Twins**	American	
1992	Dan Duquette (1)	Montreal Expos	National	
1993	Lee Thomas	Philadelphia Phillies	National	
1994	John Hart (1)	Cleveland Indians	American	
1995	John Hart (2)	Cleveland Indians	American	
1996	Doug Melvin	Texas Rangers	American	
1997	Cam Bonifay	Pittsburgh Pirates	National	
1998	Gerry Hunsicker	Houston Astros	National	
1999	Billy Beane (1)	Oakland Athletics	American	
2000	Walt Jocketty (1)	St. Louis Cardinals	National	
2001	Pat Gillick^{†}	Seattle Mariners	American	
2002	Terry Ryan (1)	Minnesota Twins	American	
2003	Brian Sabean	San Francisco Giants	National	
2004	Walt Jocketty (2)	St. Louis Cardinals	National	
2005	Mark Shapiro (1)	Cleveland Indians	American	
2006	Terry Ryan (2)	Minnesota Twins	American	
2007	Mark Shapiro (2)	Cleveland Indians	American	
2008	Andrew Friedman	Tampa Bay Rays	American	
2009	Dan O'Dowd	Colorado Rockies	National	
2010	Walt Jocketty (3)	Cincinnati Reds	National	
2011^	Dave Dombrowski	Detroit Tigers	American	
2011^	Doug Melvin (2)	Milwaukee Brewers	National	
2012	Billy Beane (2)	Oakland Athletics	American	
2013	Ben Cherington	**Boston Red Sox**	American	
2014	Dan Duquette (2)	Baltimore Orioles	American	
2015	Alex Anthopoulos	Toronto Blue Jays	American	
2016	Theo Epstein	**Chicago Cubs**	National	
2017	Chris Antonetti	Cleveland Indians	American	
2018	Billy Beane (3)	Oakland Athletics	American	
2019	Erik Neander	Tampa Bay Rays	American	
2020	Rick Hahn	Chicago White Sox	American	
2021	Farhan Zaidi	San Francisco Giants	National	
2022	Chris Antonetti (2)	Cleveland Guardians	American	
2023	Mike Elias	Baltimore Orioles	American	
2024	Matt Arnold	Milwaukee Brewers	National	
2025	Matt Arnold (2)	Milwaukee Brewers	National	
2026	Erik Neander	Tampa Bay Rays	American	

== See also ==
- Baseball America Major League Executive of the Year
- MLB Executive of the Year Award
- List of Major League Baseball awards
