= Andrew Friedman =

American baseball executive

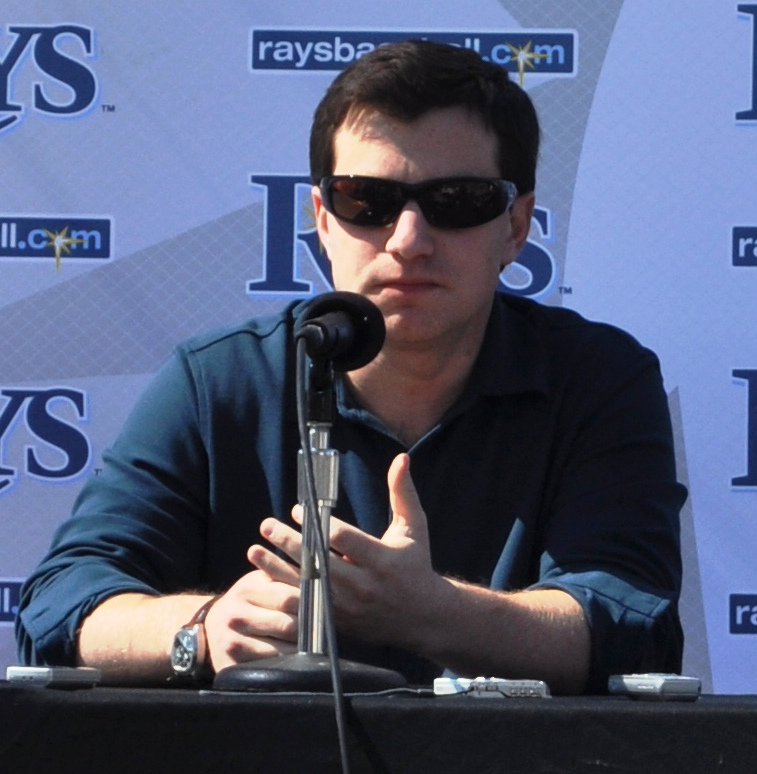
- Friedman in 2011

Los Angeles Dodgers
- President of Baseball Operations
- Born: Houston, Texas, U.S.

Teams
- Tampa Bay Rays (2004–2014); Los Angeles Dodgers (2015–present)

Career highlights and awards
- 3× World Series champion (2020, 2024, 2025); MLB Executive of the Year Award (2020); Sporting News Executive of the Year (2008)

Andrew Friedman is an American professional baseball executive. He is currently the president of baseball operations of the Los Angeles Dodgers of Major League Baseball (MLB). He previously served as the general manager for MLB's Tampa Bay Rays, where Sporting News named him Executive of the Year in 2008. That year, for the first time in franchise history, the Rays both qualified for the playoffs and played in the World Series. In Los Angeles, as of 2025, Friedman and the Dodgers have won three World Series, five pennants, and nine division titles since he took the job after the 2014 season. Baseball America called the Dodgers the model franchise in the sport under Friedman's tenure as President.

== Early and personal life ==
Friedman was born in Houston and is Jewish. His father, J. Kent Friedman, known as Kenny, is a lawyer who played college baseball for Tulane. Andrew Friedman attended and played baseball as a center fielder and leadoff hitter for Episcopal High School in Houston.

Friedman attended Tulane University on a baseball scholarship. He played center field for the Green Wave, but was hit by a pitch that broke his left hand in the fall of his freshman year. He returned from that injury the following year, but then separated his left shoulder while sliding headfirst into third base. He earned a B.S. in management, with a concentration in finance, at Tulane's Freeman School of Business in 1999.

Friedman became an analyst with Bear Stearns from 1999 to 2002, and then was an associate at MidMark Capital, a private equity firm from 2002 to 2004.

He and his wife, Robin, live in Pasadena, California, with their three children.

== Career ==
=== Tampa Bay Rays ===
In 2003, Friedman met Stuart Sternberg, the new owner of the Tampa Bay Rays. They realized they had similar ideas about the game and wanted to work together.

From 2004 to 2005, Friedman served as the director of baseball development for the Rays. He was promoted to the position of executive vice president of baseball operations and general manager after the 2005 season, at the age of 28, replacing the club's first general manager, Chuck LaMar, who was fired following the club's eighth losing season in its eight years of existence.

Friedman gradually rebuilt the team. It ultimately paid off in 2008 when the Rays made the postseason for the first time in franchise history, and advanced all the way to the World Series. For his efforts, he was named as Baseball Executive of the Year by Sporting News. They also made the playoffs in 2010, 2011 and 2013 under his tenure.

=== Los Angeles Dodgers ===
On October 14, 2014, it was announced that Friedman had left the Rays to become the President of Baseball Operations for the Los Angeles Dodgers. His contract with the Dodgers was reported at $35 million for five years, making him the highest-paid front-office executive in baseball. Upon joining the Dodgers, team president and CEO Stan Kasten called Friedman "one of the youngest and brightest minds in the game today".

Friedman hired former Oakland Athletics executive Farhan Zaidi as the Dodgers' new general manager and brought in former Padres general manager Josh Byrnes as vice president of baseball operations.

In his first offseason with the Dodgers, Friedman and the new front office made a huge splash. Through free agency or trades, the Dodgers parted ways with shortstop Hanley Ramírez, outfielder Matt Kemp, second baseman Dee Gordon, and pitchers Brian Wilson and Dan Haren. However, they bolstered their farm system and added key players such as catcher Yasmani Grandal, infielders Howie Kendrick and Jimmy Rollins, and pitchers Brett Anderson & Mike Bolsinger. Friedman helped lead the Dodgers to their third straight National League West division title in 2015, his first season, but the team fell to the New York Mets in the National League Division Series (NLDS), 3–2.

After the 2015 season, MLB penalized the Dodgers with a record $43 million luxury tax after determining their payroll was nearly $300 million, also an all-time record. The Dodgers mutually parted ways with manager Don Mattingly following the 2015 season, and Friedman hired former Dodgers outfielder Dave Roberts to succeed Mattingly as manager. Starting pitcher Zack Greinke left the Dodgers for the Arizona Diamondbacks in free agency, and Friedman responded by signing pitchers Scott Kazmir and Kenta Maeda. The Dodgers, Reds, and White Sox completed a three-team trade, that netted the Dodgers outfielder Trayce Thompson, among others. For the first time since 2014, Friedman returned to Tropicana Field on May 3, 2016, when the Dodgers played the Rays. The Dodgers won their fourth straight National League West division title in 2016, in part due to mid-season trades for pitchers Rich Hill and Josh Fields and outfielder Josh Reddick. The Dodgers won the NLDS against the Nationals in five games, but fell to the Cubs in the NLCS.

The Dodgers opted not to spend big money on any outside free agents after the 2016 season, and instead re-signed their own three notable free agents: Rich Hill, Kenley Jansen, and Justin Turner. The 2017 Dodgers opened the season 35–25, but then won 44 of their next 51 games. Friedman's front office was again aggressive at the non-waiver trade deadline, trading for right-handed starting pitcher Yu Darvish and left-handed relievers Tony Watson and Tony Cingrani. The Dodgers won their fifth straight NL West title, defeated the Cubs in their NLCS rematch from the previous year, and advanced to the World Series for the first time since 1988. They fell to the Astros in seven games. Baseball America recognized their efforts by naming the Dodgers as its 2017 Organization of the Year, honoring the team for its success from top to bottom.

In 2018, Friedman's Dodgers overcame a slow start and eventually won their sixth straight division title, after defeating the Rockies in a one-game playoff. Friedman was aggressive at the trade deadline once again, acquiring Manny Machado to bolster the lineup following a season-ending injury to Corey Seager. The Dodgers won their second consecutive National League pennant, but again fell in the World Series, this time to the Red Sox in five games.

In 2019, the Dodgers won their seventh straight NL West title and fourth under Friedman's leadership. Despite winning a franchise record 106 games, the Dodgers fell to the eventual World Series champion Nationals in 5 games during the NLDS. During the 2019–2020 off-season, Friedman and the Dodgers traded for All-Star outfielder Mookie Betts, while subsequently signing him to the largest contract he has given out—a 12 year, $365 million deal. The 2020 Dodgers went 43-17 during the COVID-19 shortened regular season and would go on to win their first World Series in 32 years against his former club, the Tampa Bay Rays, in six games. He was selected as the winner of the MLB Executive of the Year Award. Baseball America also selected him the Executive of the Year and named the Dodgers the Organization of the Year for the second time in four seasons. From 2021 to 2023, Los Angeles would continue their regular-season success, but went home early each of these seasons, including winning just one postseason game in 2022 and 2023.

Friedman and the Dodgers would sign two-way star Shohei Ohtani to a record 10-year, $700 million contract in December before the start of the 2024 season. That same month, the Dodgers signed Japanese pitcher Yoshinobu Yamamoto to a 12-year, $325 million contract, which included a $50.625 million posting fee to Yamamoto's previous team, the Orix Buffaloes. The team solidified the strong off-season by signing outfielder Teoscar Hernandez and trading for All-Star pitcher Tyler Glasnow. In terms of on-field success, Ohtani would win the (NL) MVP and become the first player to break the 50 home run, 50 stolen bases barrier. For the Dodgers, they would win their eighth World Series in franchise history, and second in the 2020s. The Dodgers continued to upgrade the roster by signing ace pitcher Blake Snell and winning the bidding rights to sign Japanese phenom Roki Sasaki in the off-season, while also bringing back most of the core from the 2024 championship roster. They repeated as champions in 2025, defeating the Toronto Blue Jays in seven games. They were the first National League team to defend their title successfully since the 1976 Reds and the first in MLB since the 2000 Yankees.

Much of the Dodgers' success under Friedman is due to homegrown talent that Friedman refused to include in trades, including Seager, outfielders Cody Bellinger and Joc Pederson, and pitchers Julio Urias and Walker Buehler. The Dodgers' farm system is consistently ranked among the best in Major League Baseball. When he has traded prospects or young talent, he has the flexibility to acquire talent such as Rich Hill, Yu Darvish, Manny Machado, Mookie Betts, and Jack Flaherty all of which are expensive veterans but not with long contracts. In 2020, Baseball America called Los Angeles the model franchise in the sport.

=== Management and coaching tree ===
Friedman has trained and developed a number of successful baseball executives and coaches. Among the executives are Chaim Bloom, former Chief Baseball Officer for the Boston Red Sox and current President of Baseball Operations for the St. Louis Cardinals; James Click, former general manager of the Houston Astros and current Toronto Blue Jays VP; Alex Anthopoulos, general manager and president of baseball operations for the Atlanta Braves; Farhan Zaidi, former president of baseball operations for the San Francisco Giants; Matt Arnold, general manager for the Milwaukee Brewers; Erik Neander, senior vice president of baseball operations and general manager of the Tampa Bay Rays; and Peter Bendix, the president of baseball operations for the Miami Marlins.

Managers and coaches include Dave Roberts, Dodgers' manager since 2016; Joe Maddon, who managed the Rays during Friedman's entire tenure with that club, and later the Cubs and Angels; Dave Martinez, manager of the Washington Nationals, who worked as the Rays' bench coach under Maddon; Charlie Montoyo, manager of the Toronto Blue Jays from 2015 to 2018, who also coached under Maddon while Maddon was the Rays manager; Rocco Baldelli, who after serving as a special assistant to Friedman, was hired as the manager of the Minnesota Twins; Gabe Kapler, former Philadelphia Phillies' and San Francisco Giants' manager, who served as the Dodgers farm director from 2015 to 2017; and in 2024, Clayton McCullough was named the Miami Marlins manager after serving as Dodgers' first base coach for four seasons.

In 2020 and 2021, each executive who ran the final four teams in the postseason all worked under Friedman at one point in their careers.

Sporting positions
Preceded by Chuck LaMar	Tampa Bay Devil Rays General Manager; 2006–2007	Succeeded by Franchise renamed
Preceded by Franchise renamed	Tampa Bay Rays General Manager; 2008–2014	Succeeded by Matthew Silverman
Preceded by Position established	Los Angeles Dodgers President of Baseball Operations; 2014–present	Succeeded by Current
