= Baseball America =

Bi-weekly sports periodical in English

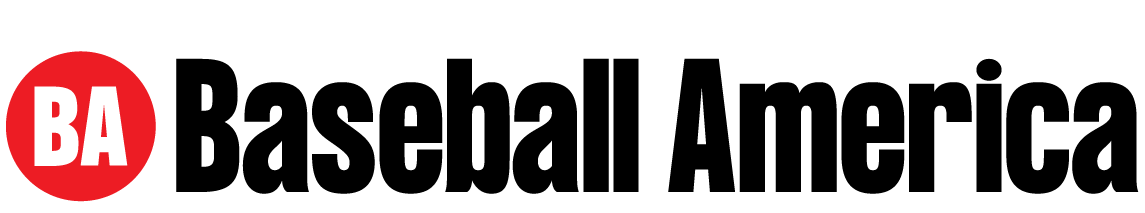
- Categories: Sports
- Frequency: 12 per year
- Founded: 1981
- Company: Baseball America Enterprises
- Country: United States
- Based in: Durham, North Carolina, U.S.
- Language: English
- Website: BaseballAmerica.com
- ISSN: 0745-5372

Baseball America (BA) is an American sports publication company that covers baseball at every level, including Major League Baseball (MLB), with a particular focus on up-and-coming players in Minor League Baseball (MiLB) college, high school, and international leagues. It is currently published in the form of an editorial and stats website, a monthly magazine, a podcast network, and three annual reference book titles. It also regularly produces lists of the top prospects in the sport, and covers aspects of the game from a scouting and player development point of view.

== History ==
Baseball America was founded in 1981 and has since grown into a full-service media company. Founder Allan Simpson began writing the magazine from Canada, originally calling it the All-America Baseball News. By 1983, Simpson moved the magazine to Durham, North Carolina, after it was purchased by then-Durham Bulls owner Miles Wolff. Simpson left his position at the magazine in 2006.

Source Interlink (later the Motor Trend Group) purchased Baseball America in December 2011 and sold the publication in February 2017. The new Baseball America Enterprises includes Gary Green and Larry Botel of Alliance Baseball, owners of minor league franchises in Omaha, Nebraska, and Richmond, Virginia, in partnership with David Geaslen, founder and CEO of 3STEP Sports. Today, Baseball America is led by president Tom Dondero and Editor in Chief J.J. Cooper. It also uses outsourced correspondents.

== Content ==
Baseball America is published on the web and monthly in print. Every issue features coverage of the majors, minors, baseball's draft, college and high school baseball. Other features include reviews and analysis of prospects as well as tracking the progress of the best players in amateur baseball and the minors.

Other annual publications produced by the company include Baseball America Almanac, Baseball America Prospect Handbook (a New York Times sports best-seller in March 2016), and the Baseball America Directory. Baseball America also has an active social media presence on YouTube and Instagram.

== All-Star Futures Game ==
Baseball America helps MLB select the players for the All-Star Futures Game.

== Major League Baseball awards ==
Awards include:

=== Baseball America All-Rookie Team ===
Note: Each year's team consists of a varying number of pitchers and types of pitchers.

- 2007
- 2008
- 2009 (a catcher, 4 infielders, 3 outfielders, one DH, and 5 pitchers)
- 2010 (a catcher, 4 infielders, 3 outfielders, one DH, 5 starting pitchers, 2 relief pitchers, and one closer)
- 2011 (a catcher, 4 infielders, 3 outfielders, one DH, 5 starting pitchers, 2 relief pitchers, and one closer)

=== Baseball America Manager of the Year ===
- 1998 – Larry Dierker, Houston
- 1999 – Jimy Williams, Boston
- 2000 – Dusty Baker, San Francisco
- 2001 – Lou Piniella, Seattle
- 2002 – Mike Scioscia, Los Angeles Angels
- 2003 – Jack McKeon, Florida
- 2004 – Bobby Cox, Atlanta
- 2005 – Ozzie Guillén, Chicago White Sox
- 2006 – Jim Leyland, Detroit
- 2007 – Terry Francona, Boston
- 2008 – Ron Gardenhire, Minnesota
- 2009 – Mike Scioscia, Los Angeles Angels
- 2010 – Bobby Cox, Atlanta
- 2011 – Joe Maddon, Tampa Bay
- 2012 – Buck Showalter, Baltimore
- 2013 – Clint Hurdle, Pittsburgh
- 2014 – Buck Showalter, Baltimore
- 2015 – Joe Maddon, Chicago Cubs
- 2016 – Terry Francona, Cleveland
- 2017 - A. J. Hinch, Houston
- 2018 - Bob Melvin, Oakland
- 2019 - Craig Counsell, Milwaukee
- 2020 - Brian Snitker, Atlanta
- 2021 - Dusty Baker, Houston
- 2022 - Brandon Hyde, Baltimore
- 2023 - Torey Lovullo, Arizona
- 2024 - Dave Roberts, Los Angeles Dodgers
- 2025 - Pat Murphy, Milwaukee

=== Baseball America Major League Executive of the Year ===
- 2006 – Dave Dombrowski, Detroit Tigers
- 2007 – Jack Zduriencik, Milwaukee Brewers
- 2008 – Theo Epstein, Boston Red Sox
- 2009 – Dan O'Dowd, Colorado Rockies
- 2010 – Jon Daniels, Texas Rangers
- 2011 – Doug Melvin, Milwaukee Brewers
- 2012 – Brian Sabean, San Francisco Giants
- 2013 – Billy Beane, Oakland Athletics
- 2014 – Dan Duquette, Baltimore Orioles
- 2015 – Sandy Alderson, New York Mets
- 2016 – Chris Antonetti, Cleveland Indians
- 2017 – Brian Cashman, New York Yankees
- 2018 – Dave Dombrowski, Boston Red Sox
- 2019 – Mike Rizzo, Washington Nationals
- 2020 – Andrew Friedman, Los Angeles Dodgers
- 2021 – Farhan Zaidi, San Francisco Giants
- 2022 – Alex Anthopoulos, Atlanta Braves
- 2023 – Mike Elias, Baltimore Orioles
- 2024 – Matt Arnold, Milwaukee Brewers
- 2025 – Jerry Dipoto, Seattle Mariners

=== Baseball America Organization of the Year ===
The "Organization of the Year" award was first presented in 1982.

- 1982 – Oakland Athletics
- 1983 – New York Mets
- 1984 – New York Mets
- 1985 – Milwaukee Brewers
- 1986 – Milwaukee Brewers
- 1987 – Milwaukee Brewers
- 1988 – Montreal Expos
- 1989 – Texas Rangers
- 1990 – Montreal Expos
- 1991 – Atlanta Braves
- 1992 – Cleveland Indians
- 1993 – Toronto Blue Jays
- 1994 – Kansas City Royals
- 1995 – New York Mets
- 1996 – Atlanta Braves
- 1997 – Detroit Tigers
- 1998 – New York Yankees
- 1999 – Oakland Athletics
- 2000 – Chicago White Sox
- 2001 – Houston Astros
- 2002 – Minnesota Twins
- 2003 – Florida Marlins
- 2004 – Minnesota Twins
- 2005 – Atlanta Braves
- 2006 – Los Angeles Dodgers
- 2007 – Colorado Rockies
- 2008 – Tampa Bay Rays
- 2009 – Philadelphia Phillies
- 2010 – San Francisco Giants
- 2011 – St. Louis Cardinals
- 2012 – Cincinnati Reds
- 2013 – St. Louis Cardinals
- 2014 – Kansas City Royals
- 2015 – Pittsburgh Pirates
- 2016 – Chicago Cubs
- 2017 – Los Angeles Dodgers
- 2018 - Milwaukee Brewers
- 2019 - Tampa Bay Rays
- 2020 - Los Angeles Dodgers
- 2021 - Tampa Bay Rays
- 2022 - Seattle Mariners
- 2023 - Texas Rangers
- 2024 - San Diego Padres
- 2025 - Milwaukee Brewers

=== Other awards ===
- Baseball America Major League Coach of the Year
- Baseball America Roland Hemond Award
- Baseball America Lifetime Achievement Award

== Minor League Baseball awards ==
Awards include:

- Baseball America Minor League Player of the Year Award
- Baseball America Independent Leagues Player of the Year
- Baseball America Minor League All-Star Team (First team and Second team)
- Baseball America Triple-A Classification All-Star Team
- Baseball America Double-A Classification All-Star Team
- Baseball America High Class A Classification All-Star Team
- Baseball America Low Class A Classification All-Star Team
- Baseball America Rookie-Level Classification All-Star Team
- Baseball America Dominican Summer League Classification All-Star Team
- Baseball America Short-Season Classification All-Star Team
- Baseball America Minor League Manager of the Year
- Baseball America Minor League Team of the Year
- Baseball America Minor League Executive of the Year
- Baseball America Bob Freitas Awards (for outstanding minor-league operations at Triple-A, Double-A, Class A, and short-season) (first awarded in 1989)
- Baseball America Independent Organization of the Year (first awarded in 2006)

== College baseball awards ==
Awards include:

- Baseball America College Player of the Year Award
- Baseball America All-America Teams
- Baseball America Freshman of The Year
- Baseball America Freshman All-America Team
- Baseball America Summer College Player of the Year
- Baseball America College Coach of the Year
- Baseball America Assistant Coach of the Year

In addition to these awards, Baseball America releases rankings of the top 25 teams in the nation, as voted by its staff. A preseason poll is compiled, in addition to a weekly poll during the season.

== High school baseball awards ==
Awards include:

- Baseball America High School Player of the Year Award
- Baseball America High School Team of the Year
- Baseball America High School All-America Teams
- Baseball America Youth Player of the Year
- Baseball America Youth Coach of the Year

== See also ==
- List of MLB awards
