= David Stearns =

American baseball executive (born 1985)

New York Mets
- President of Baseball Operations
- Born: February 18, 1985 (age 41); Manhattan, New York, U.S.

Teams
- Cleveland Indians (2011–2012); Houston Astros (2013–2015); Milwaukee Brewers (2015–2023); New York Mets (2024–present)

David Stearns (born February 18, 1985) is an American baseball executive who has served as the president of baseball operations for the New York Mets of Major League Baseball (MLB) since 2024. He previously served in the same role for the Milwaukee Brewers. When Stearns became the general manager of the Brewers in 2015 at age 30, he was the youngest general manager in MLB. Stearns has also served as the assistant general manager of MLB's Houston Astros and has worked for the Office of the Commissioner of Baseball, the Arizona Fall League, and the Cleveland Indians.

== Early life ==
Stearns was born and raised on the Upper East Side of Manhattan, New York City. He is Jewish. He attended Columbia Grammar & Preparatory School. Stearns graduated from Harvard University with a degree in political science in 2007. While at Harvard, he was a sportswriter for The Harvard Crimson, and also interned with the Pittsburgh Pirates.

== Professional career ==
=== Early career ===
After graduating from Harvard, Stearns worked for the baseball operations departments for the New York Mets and the Arizona Fall League. He joined the MLB Central Office in 2008, where he worked on the negotiating team for MLB's collective bargaining agreement.

=== Cleveland Indians ===
In December 2011, the Cleveland Indians hired Stearns and Derek Falvey as their co-directors of baseball operations, with Stearns focusing on player contracts, data analysis, and strategy.

=== Houston Astros ===
In November 2012, the Houston Astros, who had lost over 100 games in both of the past two seasons, hired Stearns as assistant general manager, second only to Jeff Luhnow, the general manager. While many organizations have multiple assistant general managers, the Astros employed only Stearns in that role.

When talking about August 2015, Luhnow said of his staff: “There’s several people in our organization that have GM potential, and David’s one of them."

=== Milwaukee Brewers ===
On September 21, 2015, the Milwaukee Brewers named Stearns their next general manager, succeeding the retiring Doug Melvin, who they announced would remain with the team in an advisory role. At age 30, he became the youngest general manager in MLB and one of the youngest in history; he was one year younger than Brewers star Ryan Braun. (Note: Although Stearns was the youngest active general manager at that time, both Theo Epstein and Jon Daniels had become general managers at age 28.) At his introductory press conference, Stearns endorsed Craig Counsell as the Brewers' manager.

Stearns let go of five of the Brewers' seven coaches and restructured the front office by reassigning Gord Ash, the assistant general manager, and Reid Nichols, the farm director, within the organization, and hiring Matt Arnold from the Tampa Bay Rays as assistant general manager. During his first offseason as general manager, Stearns replaced half of the Brewers' 40-man roster. His first transactions included trading Jonathan Lucroy and acquiring Travis Shaw, Eric Thames, and Anthony Swarzak.

In 2018, Stearns signed free agents Lorenzo Cain and Jhoulys Chacin and traded for Christian Yelich, who won the National League MVP in his first season as a Brewer. The Brewers were in second place in the NL Central by the MLB trade deadline. At the deadline, Stearns orchestrated moves to acquire Mike Moustakas, Curtis Granderson, Gio Gonzalez, and Jonathan Schoop. The Brewers went on to win the division after defeating the Chicago Cubs in the 2018 National League Central tie-breaker game, and they beat the Colorado Rockies in the 2018 National League Division Series in three games. However, they lost to the Los Angeles Dodgers in the 2018 National League Championship Series in seven games. Yelich was named the 2018 NL MVP after the season. Stearns finished second in the MLB Executive of the Year voting but was the highest-voted NL executive.

In January 2019, the Brewers signed Stearns to a contract extension, and promoted him to president of baseball operations, while he maintained his position as general manager. After the 2020 season, the Brewers promoted Matt Arnold to general manager, with Stearns remaining president of baseball operations.

On October 27, 2022, the Brewers announced Stearns was stepping down as president of baseball operations, and moving into an advisory role with ownership. General Manager Matt Arnold took over baseball operations duties. The move came after a disappointing Brewers season in which the club missed the playoffs for the first time in five years. On August 1, 2022, the team traded star closer Josh Hader one day before the trade deadline, in exchange for Taylor Rogers, Dinelson Lamet, Esteury Ruiz and Robert Gasser. At the time, Milwaukee sat in first place in the NL Central but would finish the season seven games behind the St. Louis Cardinals. After they were eliminated from playoff contention on October 3, many pointed to the Hader trade as the turning point in the season. Stearns had thought that the other relievers that had been assembled would be able to effectively replace Hader, but that did not happen. Stearns himself hinted at regretting the move in his season-ending press conference, admitting, "It had a more pronounced impact than I thought it would at the time, and the surrounding moves didn't adequately fortify the team in Josh's absence." In the long term, however, the trade rebounded to be a resounding success for the Brewers, as one of the players received in the deal, starting pitcher Robert Gasser, turned into a key component for the team, while another player Milwaukee received, Esteury Ruiz, was used to trade for star catcher William Contreras, a core member of the Brewers widely seen as among the best all around catchers in baseball; both were important contributors to the 2026 Brewers' pennant-winning team.

Stearns is generally considered to have presided over one of the most successful stretches in Brewers history, guiding the organization to four consecutive playoff appearances from 2018–2021. Following his resignation, Stearns was regularly connected in rumors reported by the media to president positions with the New York Mets and Houston Astros.

=== New York Mets ===
Stearns had been long linked to the New York Mets, the team for which he had rooted growing up. Team owner Steve Cohen reached out to the Brewers on two occasions about a front office position, only to be rejected both times. His contract with the Brewers ended after the 2023 season. After the New York Mets faced the Philadelphia Phillies in the final game of the 2023 season on October 1, 2023, team owner Steve Cohen announced that the Mets had hired Stearns as president of baseball operations. He was introduced the following day; his first major move, announced on October 1, was the termination of manager Buck Showalter. It had been speculated Stearns would reunite with former Brewers manager Craig Counsell; however, Counsell went to the Chicago Cubs and the Mets hired New York Yankees bench coach Carlos Mendoza.

Stearns planned for the 2024 season to be a transitional one for the Mets. However, despite a 24–35 start, the team significantly improved. During the offseason and regular season, Stearns was noted for making low-risk moves and not pursuing expensive free agents; however, cheaper free agents the Mets acquired were crucial in the team's turnaround. The Mets finished with a record of 89–73, clinching a spot in the 2024 MLB postseason. They then advanced to the 2024 National League Division Series after defeating the Milwaukee Brewers 2–1 in the 2024 National League Wild Card Series, and to the 2024 National League Championship Series after beating the Philadelphia Phillies 3–1 in the Division Series.

Stearns received criticism for how he handled the 2025 season, both for his off-season decisions (particularly those involving the starting rotation) and for his handling of the trade deadline. The Mets regressed from their 2024 record by six games and missed the playoffs by one game.

During the 2026 season, Stearns was primarily criticized for having not re-signed Pete Alonso before the season, along with acquiring injury-prone players such as Luis Robert Jr. and Jorge Polanco, both of whom missed significant playing time due to injuries. Stearns, though, continued to believe in building the team for long-term success by focusing on acquiring young talent, instead of signing declining talent for high prices for the purpose of chasing short term success. The team struggled almost from the start, including losing 12 straight in April; manager Carlos Mendoza was fired halfway through the season, with the team's record at 34-47. Interim manager Andy Green replaced him and the play improved, but the team still missed the playoffs, finishing the season in last place in the National League Eastern Division with a poor 74-88 record, the sixth worst result in the major leagues. With the early-August trade deadline approaching, the Mets' playoff chances were already very slim, leading Stearns to trade away nearly the entire major league bullpen in exchange for a slew of promising prospects. The result was a 27-21 record in their last 48 games, a pace which translates into a 91-71 record over a full 162 game season. Meanwhile, numerous minor league players both drafted and acquired by Stearns continued to excel, with several appearing to be on the verge of joining the big league club the following season.

== Personal life ==
Stearns married Whitney Ann Lee in 2021.
