= Major League Baseball Executive of the Year Award =

Major League Baseball annual award

MLB Executive of the Year Award
- Sport: Baseball
- League: Major League Baseball
- Awarded for: Outstanding executive, as selected by teams in the league
- Presented by: Major League Baseball

History
- First award: 2018
- First winner: Billy Beane (2018)
- Most wins: Matt Arnold (2)
- Most recent: Matt Arnold (2025)

The MLB Executive of the Year Award was created by Major League Baseball (MLB) following the 2018 season. The honor is presented annually to a top-performing executive—such as a general manager—across MLB. Voting is conducted by all 30 clubs prior to the start of the postseason.

The inaugural recipient was Billy Beane of the Oakland Athletics, while the current honoree is two-time winner Matt Arnold of the Milwaukee Brewers.

The following is a chronological list of executives who have received the MLB Executive of the Year Award.

== Award winners ==
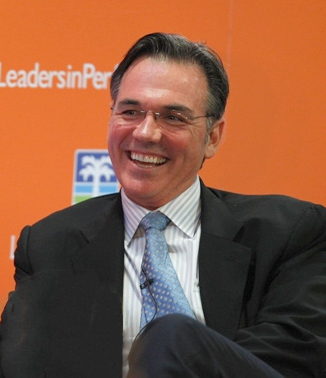
Billy Beane

Key
**Year**	Links to an article about the corresponding MLB season
**Team**	Links to an article about the team's season **Bold** indicates the team won the World Series
**Record**	The team's regular season record and winning percentage

Winners
Year	Name	Team	Record	League	Ref.
2018	Billy Beane	Oakland Athletics	97–65 (.599)	American	
2019	Erik Neander	Tampa Bay Rays	96–66 (.593)	American	
2020	Andrew Friedman	**Los Angeles Dodgers**	43–17 (.717)	National	
2021	Farhan Zaidi	San Francisco Giants	107–55 (.660)	National	
2022	Chris Antonetti	Cleveland Guardians	92–70 (.556)	American	
2023	Mike Elias	Baltimore Orioles	101–61 (.623)	American	
2024	Matt Arnold	Milwaukee Brewers	93-69 (.574)	National	
2025	Matt Arnold	Milwaukee Brewers	97–65 (.599)	National	

== See also ==
- Baseball America Major League Executive of the Year
- Sporting News Executive of the Year
- List of Major League Baseball awards
