= Billy Beane =

American baseball player and executive (born 1962)

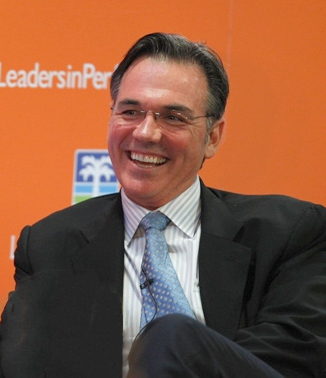
- Beane in 2012

Athletics
- Senior advisor
- Born: March 29, 1962 (age 64); Orlando, Florida, U.S.
- Batted: Right Threw: Right

MLB debut
- September 13, 1984, for the New York Mets

Last MLB appearance
- October 1, 1989, for the Oakland Athletics

MLB statistics
- Batting average: .220
- Home runs: 3
- Runs batted in: 29
- Stats at Baseball Reference

Teams
- As player: New York Mets (1984–1985); Minnesota Twins (1986–1987); Detroit Tigers (1988); Oakland Athletics (1989); As general manager: Oakland Athletics (1997–2015)

Career highlights and awards
- MLB Executive of the Year Award (2018); 3× The Sporting News Executive of the Year (1999, 2012, 2018); 2× Baseball America Executive of the Year (2002, 2013)

William Lamar Beane III (born March 29, 1962) is an American former professional baseball player and current front office executive. He is currently senior advisor to owner John Fisher and minority owner of the Athletics of Major League Baseball (MLB) and formerly the executive vice president of baseball operations. He is also a minority owner of soccer clubs Barnsley of the EFL League One in England and AZ Alkmaar of the Eredivisie in the Netherlands. From 1984 to 1989 he played in MLB as an outfielder for the New York Mets, Minnesota Twins, Detroit Tigers, and Oakland Athletics. He joined the Athletics' front office as a scout in 1990, was named general manager after the 1997 season, and was promoted to executive vice president after the 2015 season.

A first round pick in the MLB draft by the Mets, Beane failed to meet the expectations of scouts, who projected him as a star. In his front office career, Beane has applied statistical analysis (known as sabermetrics) to baseball, which has led teams to reconsider how they evaluate players. He is the subject of Michael Lewis's 2003 book on baseball economics, Moneyball, which was made into a 2011 film starring Brad Pitt as Beane.

== Early life ==
Beane grew up in Mayport, Florida, and San Diego, California, the child of a career military family. His father, a naval officer, taught him how to pitch.

Beane attended Mt. Carmel High School in San Diego, where he excelled at baseball, football, and basketball. The high school coach added Beane to the varsity baseball team for the last game of his freshman season. Beane batted .501 during his sophomore and junior years of high school. In his senior season, his batting average dropped to .300.

Despite the decrease in batting average, scouts were enamored with Beane's talent. Beane gave up football to avoid an injury that could prematurely end his baseball career. Despite this, Stanford University tried to recruit Beane on a joint baseball–football scholarship as the quarterback to succeed then-sophomore John Elway for the Stanford Cardinal football team.

== Professional career ==
=== Draft and minor leagues ===
The New York Mets, who had the first overall selection of the 1980 Major League Baseball draft, liked Beane's talent and considered choosing him with the first pick. Because many teams believed he would attend Stanford and not sign with a professional team, Beane fell to the 23rd pick, where he was taken by the Mets, who had two other first-round picks that year, allowing them to risk Beane not signing. After visiting the Mets clubhouse, Beane decided to sign with the team for a US$125,000 (equivalent to $488,439 in 2025) signing bonus. Beane called his decision to sign with the Mets instead of going to Stanford as the "only decision he would ever make in his life about money."

Believing Beane to be a more refined player than their top first-round pick, Darryl Strawberry, the Mets assigned Strawberry to play rookie ball with other high school draftees while Beane was assigned to the Little Falls Mets of the Class A New York–Penn League, with players drafted out of college. Beane struggled in his first season, batting .210. He was unable to make the adjustments necessary when playing tougher competition. The Mets promoted Beane to the Lynchburg Mets of the Class A-Advanced Carolina League in 1981. After a solid season, he was promoted to the Jackson Mets of the Class AA Texas League in 1982. While Strawberry was the league's most valuable player, Beane batted .220. Beane began questioning himself, while his new roommate, Lenny Dykstra, succeeded with unwavering confidence and superior mental focus.

=== New York Mets (1984–1985) ===
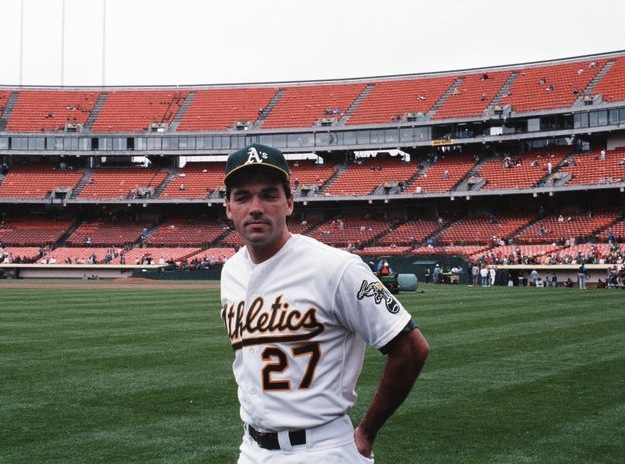
Beane at the Oakland Coliseum in 1989, during his time with the A's

Beane remained in Jackson until 1984, when he received his first promotion to MLB, appearing in five games for the 1984 New York Mets. In 1985, Beane spent most of the season with the Tidewater Tides of the Class AAA International League, getting called up to the 1985 Mets for eight games. He batted .284 for the Tides in 1985, leading the team with 19 home runs and 77 runs batted in.

=== Minnesota Twins (1986–1987) ===
Following the season, the Mets traded Beane with Joe Klink and Bill Latham to the Minnesota Twins for Tim Teufel and Pat Crosby, a minor league player.

The Twins entered spring training prepared to give Beane the job as their starting left fielder over incumbent Mickey Hatcher, but he dealt with injuries and ineffectiveness. Beane appeared in 80 games for the 1986 Minnesota Twins, batting .216. He also appeared in 32 games for the Toledo Mud Hens of the International League. The Twins sent Beane to their new Class-AAA affiliate, the Portland Beavers of the Pacific Coast League (PCL), after spring training in 1987. After batting .285 for Portland, Beane received a call-up to the Twins after the September 1 roster expansion. He appeared in 12 games for the 1987 Minnesota Twins.

=== Detroit Tigers (1988) ===
The Twins traded Beane to the Detroit Tigers for Balvino Gálvez during spring training in 1988. He made the Tigers' opening-day roster that season as an injury fill-in, and was optioned in late April to Toledo, now serving as Detroit's Class-AAA affiliate, where he spent most of the season. In Toledo, he played in the outfield with another player with nearly the same name—Billy Bean—and also had a teammate with the name Rice. Beane appeared in six games for the 1988 Tigers.

=== Oakland Athletics (1989) ===
Granted free agency after the 1988 season, Beane signed with the Oakland Athletics, appearing in 37 games with the 1989 Athletics, batting .241 in 79 at bats. Beane spent most of the season with the Class-AAA Tacoma Tigers of the PCL. He re-signed with the Athletics for the 1990 season, and was sent down to the minor leagues at the end of spring training.

== Executive career ==
Weary of the lifestyle of a minor league player, Beane approached Athletics GM Sandy Alderson a day after he was reassigned to minor league camp in April 1990 for a job as an advance scout.

Beane held the position of advance scout through 1993, when he was promoted to assistant GM of the Athletics, tasked with scouting minor-league players.

Under the ownership of Walter A. Haas Jr., the Athletics appeared in three consecutive World Series from 1988 through 1990, and had the highest payroll in baseball in 1991. Haas died in 1995, and new owners Stephen Schott and Ken Hofmann ordered Alderson to slash payroll. To field a competitive roster on a limited budget, Alderson began focusing on sabermetric principles to obtain undervalued players. He valued on-base percentage among hitters. Alderson taught Beane to find value that other teams did not see using sabermetrics.

=== Oakland Athletics (1997–2015) ===
Beane succeeded Alderson as general manager on October 17, 1997. He continued Alderson's crafting of the Athletics into one of the most cost-effective teams in baseball. For example, in the 2006 MLB season, the Athletics ranked 24th of 30 major league teams in player salaries but had the 5th-best regular-season record.

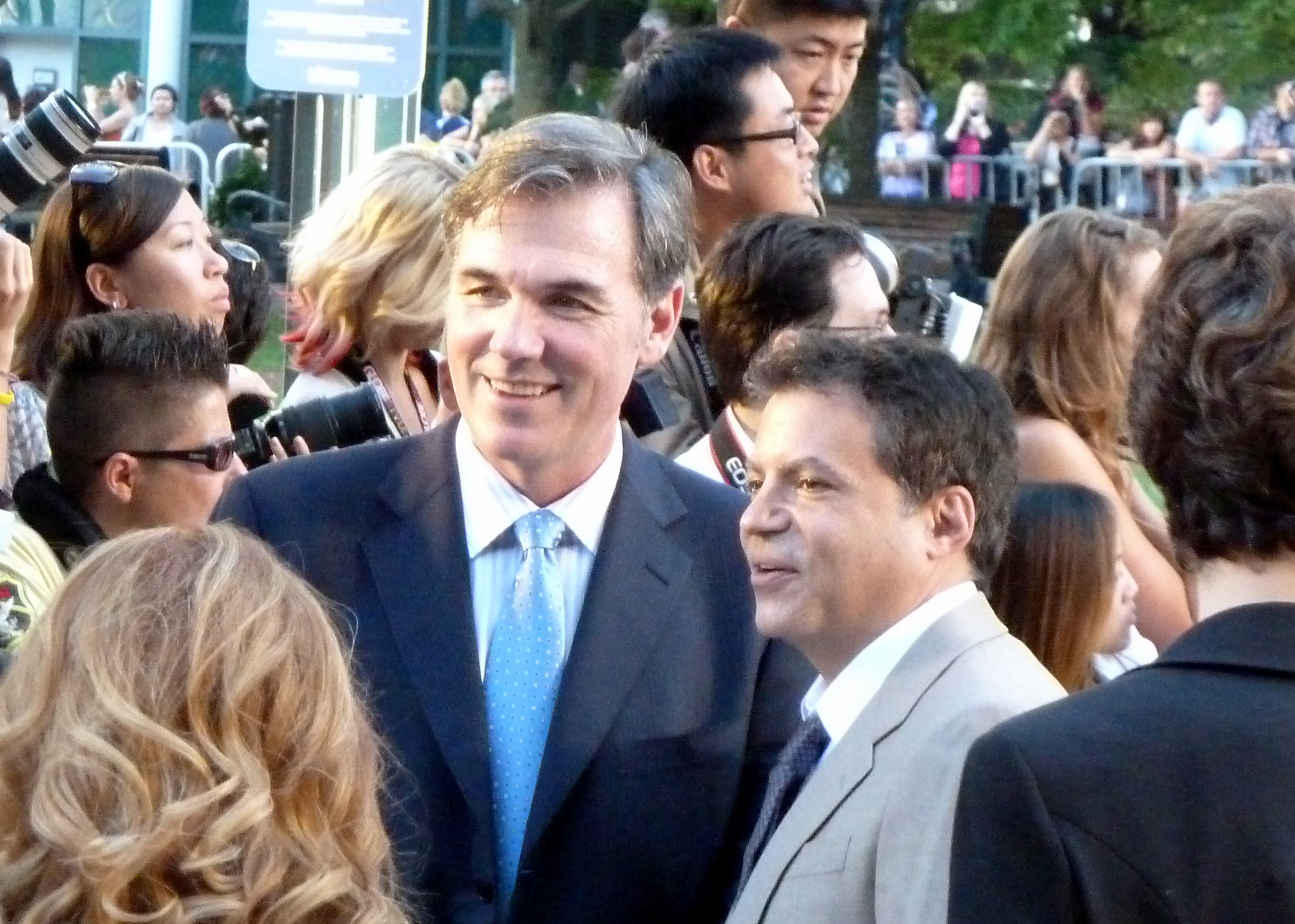
Beane (left) at the 2011 Toronto International Film Festival

The Athletics reached the playoffs in four consecutive years from 2000 through 2003, losing in the American League Division Series each year. In 2002, the Athletics became the first team in the 100+ years of American League (AL) baseball to win 20 consecutive games. After the 2002 season, the Boston Red Sox made Beane an offer of $12.5 million to become their general manager, but he declined. On April 15, 2005, Beane received a contract extension to remain with the Athletics as the team's general manager through 2012, and new team owner Lewis Wolff awarded Beane a small portion of the team's ownership. They won their first playoff series under Beane in 2006 when they swept the Minnesota Twins in the American League Division Series, but were swept by the Detroit Tigers in the American League Championship Series.

From their 2006 playoff appearance until 2012, the Athletics did not make the playoffs or finish above .500, which triggered criticism of Beane and his approach in some quarters, especially in 2009. Beane largely dismisses criticism of his approach, indicating that his philosophy revolves around research and analysis. Many other general managers have followed Beane's strategy and now use similar approaches. In December 2009, Sports Illustrated named Beane #10 on its list of the Top 10 GMs/Executives of the Decade in all sports. (Note: The list's only other MLB executives were Theo Epstein (No. 3) and Pat Gillick (No. 7).)

It's all about evaluating skills and putting a price on them. Thirty years ago, stockbrokers used to buy stock strictly by feel. Let's put it this way: Anyone in the game with a 401(k) has a choice. They can choose a fund manager who manages their retirement by gut instinct, or one who chooses by research and analysis. I know which way I'd choose.

— Billy Beane

While "Moneyball" had already changed how MLB players were valued, Beane had begun concentrating on high school players, a group he once largely ignored, in the MLB draft, considering them to be heavily undervalued. He and other like-minded GMs also changed their draft strategies to focus more on defensive skills, which became undervalued in the years immediately after the Moneyball revolution. This new emphasis on defense was displayed in the 2010 season; although the Athletics finished at .500 and again missed the playoffs, they led MLB in defensive efficiency, measured as the percentage of balls put into play by opponents that resulted in outs, and allowed the fewest runs in the AL. In February 2012, the Athletics extended Beane's contract through 2019. In the 2012 season, the Athletics again made the playoffs under Beane, winning the AL West title on the last day of the regular season. The Athletics returned to the playoffs in 2013 by winning the American League West division title again, the team's first back-to-back division championships since the 2002 and 2003 seasons.

On October 5, 2015, the Athletics announced that Beane had been promoted to executive vice president of baseball operations. Assistant GM David Forst assumed the job of general manager. In November 2022, Beane became senior advisor to owner John Fisher, and Forst became the new head of baseball operations. Under Beane's tenure as general manager, the Athletics reached the postseason eight times (2000, 2001, 2002, 2003, 2006, 2012, 2013, 2014) but won just one postseason series (the ALDS in 2006), which included seven consecutive losses (five of them in Oakland) in a winner-take-all game.

== Activities outside baseball ==
=== Soccer ===
When the Athletics ownership group agreed to purchase the reincarnation of the San Jose Earthquakes of Major League Soccer, Beane, who has expressed a passion for soccer, began developing a system for objectively analyzing soccer players. He has agreed to help the Earthquakes front office develop a method for building a cost-effective team, as the salary cap in MLS is even more restrictive than the Athletics status as a small-market team in Major League Baseball. However, a system has yet to be implemented.

Beane has regarded Arsenal's former manager Arsène Wenger as a personal idol. Beane has held discussions with Wenger, former Manchester United F.C. manager Alex Ferguson, and Liverpool F.C. owner John W. Henry. His friendship with ex-Arsenal scout Damien Comolli and Arsenal owner Stan Kroenke allowed him to delve deep into the world of English soccer.

In March 2015, the Dutch soccer club AZ Alkmaar, under general director Robert Eenhoorn, a former major leaguer, hired Beane as an advisor. He became a shareholder of the club five years later. acquiring a 5% stake in 2020. On December 19, 2017, Beane became part of a consortium led by Chien Lee to purchase Barnsley Football Club, which plays in the EFL League One, the third tier of the English football league system.

=== Software industry ===
On January 4, 2007, the software company NetSuite named Beane to its board of directors; NetSuite co-founder Evan Goldberg cited Beane's ability to combine facts with instinct. Beane also served as a consultant for, and appears in, the video game MLB Front Office Manager.

=== Moneyball ===
Author Michael Lewis' 2003 best-selling book Moneyball: The Art of Winning an Unfair Game explores Beane's methods as the general manager of the Athletics and how he, along with Paul DePodesta, used sabermetric principles to field a winning team despite an exceptionally low payroll. The book and Beane's methods influenced the way many teams and players think about the game of baseball.

The book was made into the 2011 film Moneyball, in which Beane was portrayed by Brad Pitt, whose performance earned an Oscar nomination for Best Actor.

== Personal life ==
Beane's first marriage was to Cathy Sturdivant. The couple has a daughter, Casey Beane.

Beane is married to Tara Beane. The couple have one son, Edward, and twins, Brayden and Tinsley Beane.

Beane attended the University of California, San Diego during the baseball off-seasons of his playing career where he completed a B.A in Economics.
