= Mike Elias =

American baseball executive (born 1982)

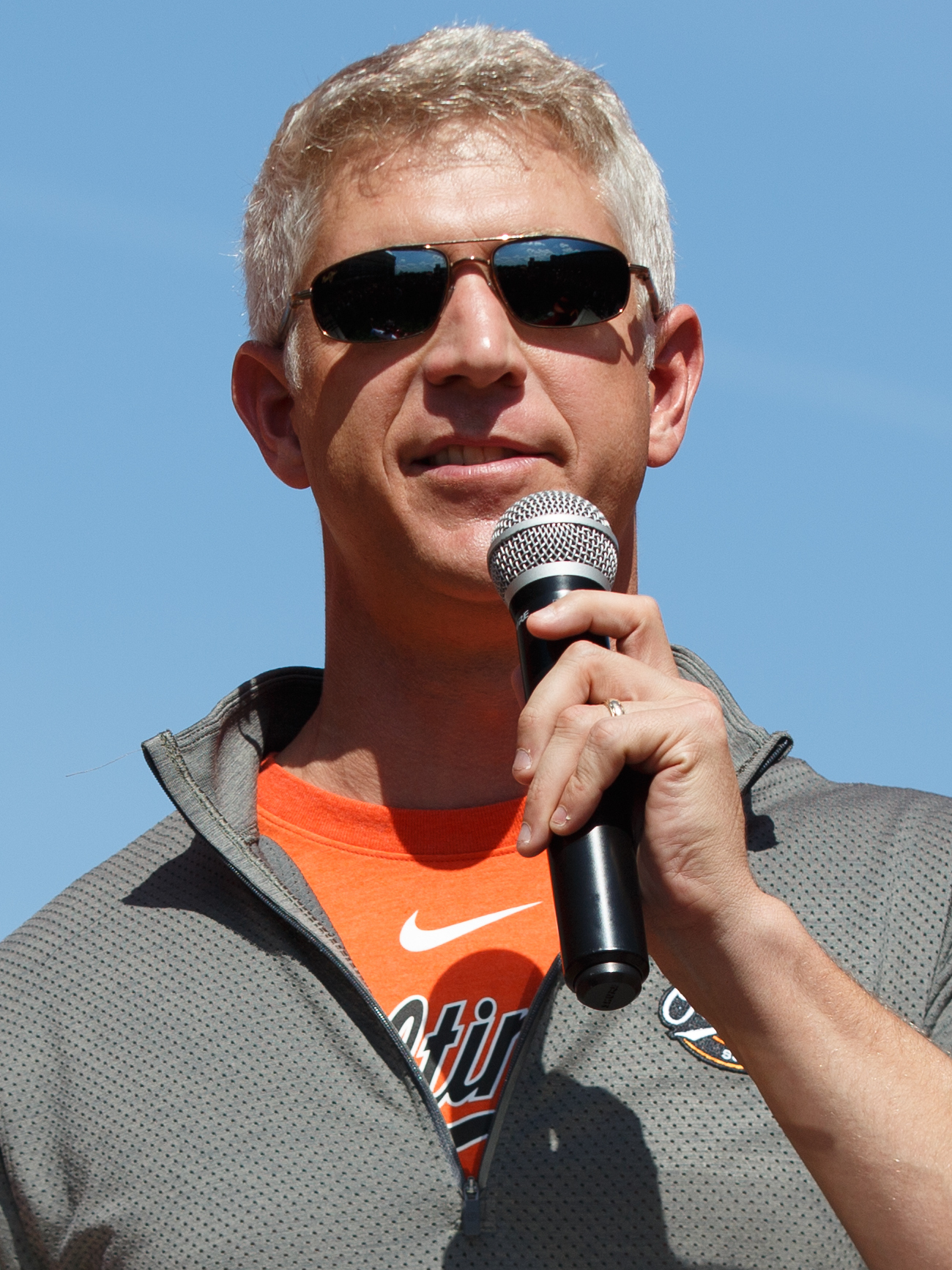

Baltimore Orioles
- President of Baseball Operations
- Born: December 28, 1982 (age 43); Alexandria, Virginia, U.S.

Teams
- St. Louis Cardinals (2007–2011); Houston Astros (2012–2018); Baltimore Orioles (2019–present)

Career highlights and awards
- MLB Executive of the Year Award (2023)

Michael Elias (born December 28, 1982) is an American baseball executive. He is the president of baseball operations and former general manager for the Baltimore Orioles of Major League Baseball (MLB).

== Early life ==
Elias graduated from Thomas Jefferson High School for Science and Technology in Alexandria, Virginia, where he was born. He attended Yale University, graduating in 2006. He played college baseball for the Yale Bulldogs as a pitcher. After his sophomore season, Elias required surgery to repair a torn labrum.

== Career ==
After graduating from Yale, Elias became a scout for the St. Louis Cardinals in 2007. When the Houston Astros hired Jeff Luhnow from the Cardinals as their general manager (GM) in 2011, Elias went to Houston with him as special assistant to the GM before being promoted to scouting director in August 2012. In 2016, after David Stearns was hired by the Milwaukee Brewers as their GM, the Astros promoted Elias to replace Stearns as assistant GM. Elias was given oversight of player development and minor league operations.

On November 16, 2018, the Baltimore Orioles hired Elias as their GM and executive vice president. He hired Sig Mejdal from the Astros as his assistant GM to bring more extensive analytics to the Orioles. The team had losing record his first four seasons before winning the American League (AL) East division in 2023. That year, Elias earned the MLB Executive of the Year Award and similar awards from Sporting News and Baseball America. During his tenure, the Orioles drafted All-Stars Adley Rutschman, Gunnar Henderson, and Jordan Westburg. The Orioles were swept in the playoffs in 2023 and 2024. Prior to the 2025 season, Elias was promoted to serve as the team's president of baseball operations. The Orioles returned to last place that season.

After the 2026 season, Elias hired Jared Banner to serve as his GM while he retained the title of president of baseball operations.

== Personal life ==
Elias and his wife have two children. They reside in Baltimore.

Sporting positions
Preceded by Dan Duquette	Baltimore Orioles General manager 2018–present	Succeeded by incumbent
