= Sig Mejdal =

American baseball statistician (born 1965)

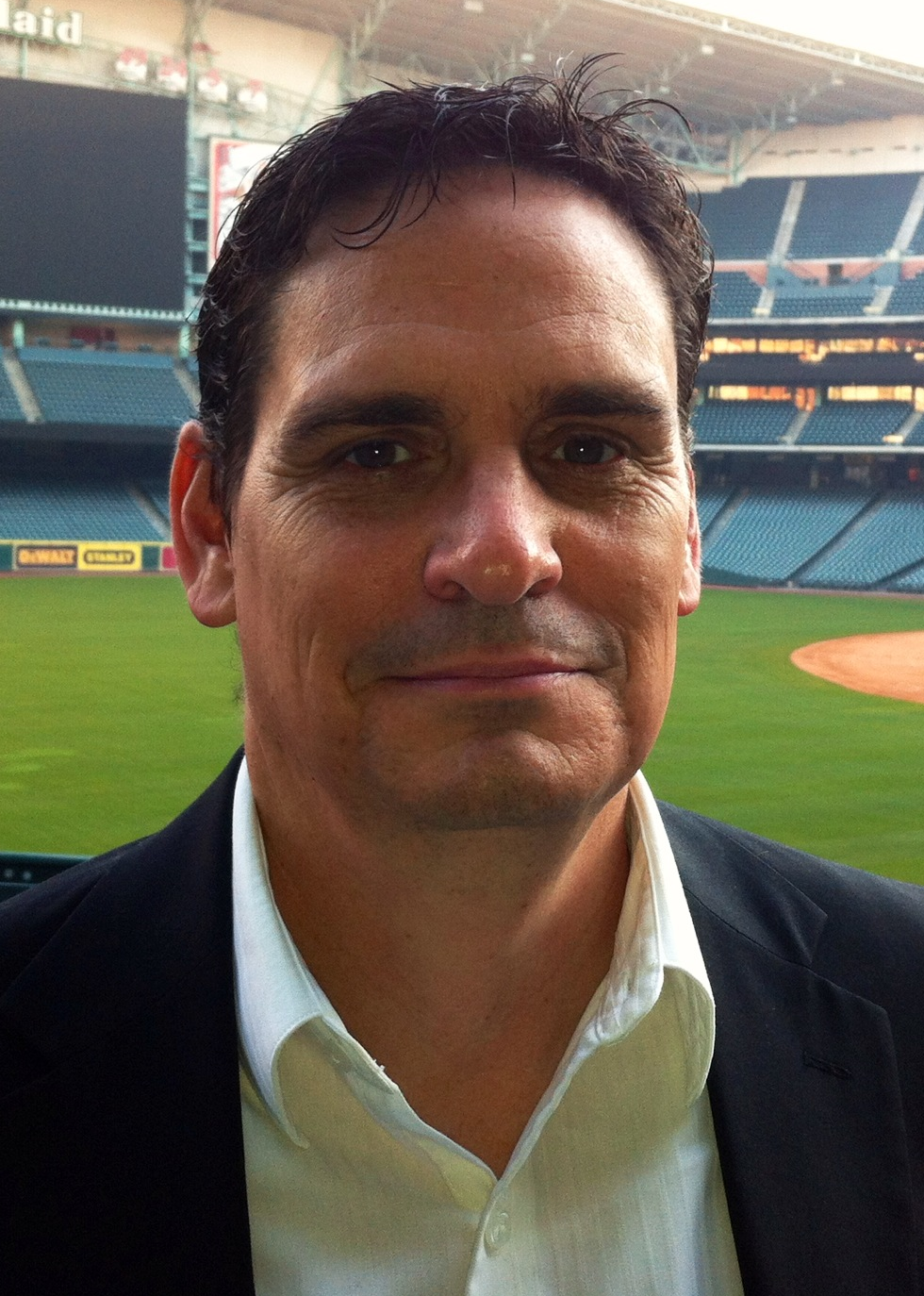
- Sig Mejdal
- Born: December 31, 1965 (age 60); San Jose, California, U.S.
- Education: University of California, Davis; San Jose State University

Sig Mejdal (/ˈmaɪdəl/ MY-dəl; born December 31, 1965) is the assistant general manager for the Baltimore Orioles of Major League Baseball.

== Early life and education ==
Sig Mejdal grew up in San Jose, California. His mother was a nurse and his father was a career army officer. In his youth, Mejdal played little league baseball for six years during his youth. He was a fan of the Oakland A's and a member of the Society for American Baseball Research. Mejdal also developed an early interest in baseball statistics at that time.

He graduated from University of California, Davis with bachelor's degrees in mechanical engineering and aeronautical engineering. Mejdal later earned master's degrees in operations research and cognitive psychology from San Jose State University. While attending college in the late 1980s, he worked as a blackjack dealer at High Sierra in Lake Tahoe.

== Career ==
After graduating from UC Davis in 1989, Mejdal worked for NASA and Lockheed Martin's satellite operations unit at the Onizuka Air Force Station. Mejdal's interest in baseball was recreational until 2003, when the book Moneyball inspired him to consider pursuing a career in sabermetrics. He attended the Winter Meetings in search for a job in baseball, didn't get a job, and continued to work at NASA as a biomathematician in the Fatigue Countermeasures Group. Mejdal studied sleep patterns of astronauts on the International Space Station in order to optimize their sleep schedules.

While working for NASA, Mejdal took a side job as the chief quantitative analyst for Sam Walker's fantasy baseball team Streetwalkers Baseball Club, which was participating in the Tout Wars competition's "Battle of the Experts." The fantasy team would later become the subject of Walker's book: Fantasyland: A Sportswriter's Obsessive Bid to Win the World's Most Ruthless Fantasy Baseball. Before entering professional baseball, Mejdal also worked as a freelance travel writer. Two of his articles appeared in the Los Angeles Times. Climbing the Stairway to Heavan accounts a 2001 mountaineering expedition in Ecuador and was also included in The Best American Sports Writing 2002 anthology. Far Away at Boarding School chronicles a 2003 surfing trip to Brazil.

=== St. Louis Cardinals ===
In 2005, Sig Mejdal was recruited to do sabermetrics for the St. Louis Cardinals' new analytics department. He analyzed years of data from college baseball games using an algorithm designed to project the likely performance and statistics of baseball players. This analytical approach was utilized by the Cardinals to effectively identify talent in the later rounds of the drafts.

Over the next seven seasons, utilizing Mejdal's algorithm, the St. Louis Cardinals drafted more players who became major leaguers than any other organization. He was promoted to senior quantitative analyst in 2008 and director of amateur draft analysis in January 2011. The Cardinals won the World Series in 2006 and 2011, with help from Mejdal.

Mejdal also created a formula to predict the risk of injury to baseball players and contributed a section on injury probability to The Bill James Handbook.

=== Houston Astros ===
In 2012, Mejdal became the Director of Decision Sciences for the Houston Astros, where he supported recruitment decisions based on physical tests and historical player performance. Hiring Mejdal to apply an analytics-based decision tree on their player choices part of the front office's effort to revitalize the team and address performance issues from prior seasons. Employing his skills as a former NASA researcher, he helped create the STOUT system in St. Louis, named after the combination of "stat" and "scout," for making player choices. In the time that Mejdal was with the Astros, they drafted more major leaguers than any other organization. The system was criticized for de-humanizing players, but after trading off some players and making new recruits, the Astro's farm system became ranked among the best in baseball. The Astros also used analytics to persuade players that were uncomfortable with non-traditional positions on the field to embrace shifts, which the team now uses very heavily. Mejdal was instrumental in the development of the Houston Astros' farm system and the team's improvement from three consecutive seasons with at least 106 losses to winning the World Series in 2017. Additionally, he played an important role in introducing more intensive batting practice routines before games.

In 2015, Mejdal was one of the team's advisers whose login credentials were believed to have been used to hack into the team's database.

=== Baltimore Orioles ===
In 2018, the Baltimore Orioles began rebuilding their team by hiring Mike Elias, previously from the Houston Astros, as General Manager. Elias subsequently hired Mejdal as vice president and Assistant General Manager of Analytics. Mejdal helped Elias by implementing advanced analytics and international scouting, similar to their successful approach with the Houston Astros. Their strategy involved dismantling the existing roster to rebuild it from the ground up, focusing on young, cost-effective talent. Key acquisitions, such as trading for ace pitcher Corbin Burnes, have positioned the Orioles as a competitive team in Major League Baseball. The Orioles moved from 110 losses in 2021 to 100 wins in 2023 and progressed from being 61 games behind the first place in 2018 to winning the AL East in 2023. While serving as an assistant general manager of the Baltimore Orioles, Sig Mejdal experimented with torpedo bats and made them available to players. According to Orioles first baseman Ryan O'Hearn, Mejdal provided him with a torpedo bat and a model customized using his batted-ball data; O'Hearn said he first learned about the bats from Mejdal in 2023.

== Bibliography ==
- Mejdal, Sig; Melissa M. Mallis; Tammy T. Nguyen; David F. Dinges (March 2004). "Summary of the Key Features of Seven Biomathematical Models of Human Fatigue and Performance". Aviation, Space, and Environmental Medicine. 75 (3): 4–14. PMID 15018262.
