= Chris Antonetti =

American professional baseball executive

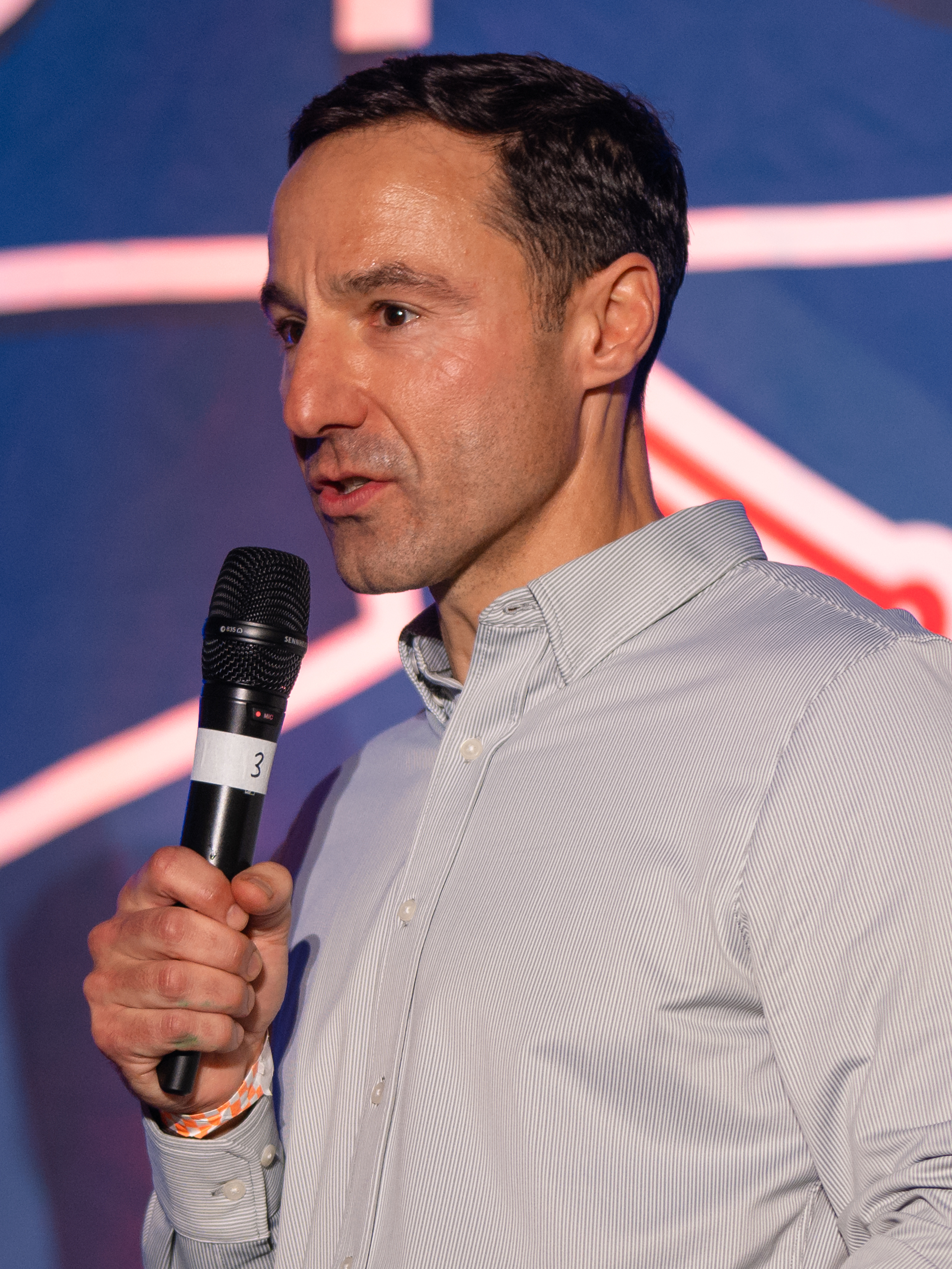
- Antonetti in 2024

Cleveland Guardians
- President of Baseball Operations
- Born: 1974 or 1975 (age 50–51)

Teams
- Montreal Expos (1998); Cleveland Indians / Guardians (1999–present)

Career highlights and awards
- MLB Executive of the Year Award (2022)

Chris Antonetti is an American professional baseball executive, and the president of baseball operations for the Cleveland Guardians of Major League Baseball (MLB).

== Biography ==
Antonetti is a graduate of Amity Regional High School in Woodbridge, Connecticut, Georgetown University, and the University of Massachusetts Amherst. He worked in the front office of the Montreal Expos in 1998. He has worked for the Cleveland Guardians franchise since 1999.

Before the 2010 season, Executive VP/GM Mark Shapiro announced his promotion to team general manager at season's end, with chairman/CEO Paul Dolan naming Antonetti as Shapiro's successor. The promotion was finalized at the end of the 2010 season. Antonetti was in charge of managing all baseball activities for Cleveland since 2010 including the MLB draft and free agency signings.

On October 6, 2015, the Cleveland franchise announced the promotion of Antonetti to president of baseball operations along with the promotion of assistant general manager Mike Chernoff to general manager. Director of baseball operations Derek Falvey filled Chernoff's spot as assistant GM.

in 2016, Antonetti led the organization to its first World Series berth since 1997. The Indians lost the series in seven games to the Chicago Cubs. Later that fall, Antonetti was awarded the Baseball America 2016 Major League Executive of the Year Award. Building on the 2016 success, the 2017 Indians won an American League best 102 games - including an American League record 22 wins in a row. Although Cleveland lost in the 2017 American League Division Series to the New York Yankees, Antonetti was award the Sporting News Executive of the Year Award following the season.

On March 2, 2021, a report from The Athletic indicated that Antonetti, alongside Cleveland manager Terry Francona, had known of the behavior of former coach Mickey Callaway (previously a coach of the team from 2013 to 2017), who was accused of sexual harassment by five women. According to the report, an attorney representing the team offered to have Francona speak to irate husband who had been repeatedly calling the club office to complain about Callaway's interactions with his wife. Although Francona was reportedly aware of Callaway's conduct with the woman, it was not clear that he knew about the attorney's suggestion. Callaway would receive a one-year ban from MLB while Francona and the organization merited criticism from his son Nick, who stated that his father lied to him about the proceedings. The MLB investigation did not reveal any wrongdoing by the organization, Antonetti, or Francona.

In 2022, following the Guardians playing to a record of 92–70, finishing first in the American League Central division, and advancing to the ALDS, Antonetti won both the Sporting News Executive of the Year Award and the MLB Executive of the Year Award.
