= 2015 Major League Baseball season =

2015 MLB season
- League: Major League Baseball
- Sport: Baseball
- Duration: April 5 – November 1, 2015
- Games: 162
- Teams: 30
- TV partner(s): Fox/FS1; TBS; ESPN; MLB Network

Draft
- Top draft pick: Dansby Swanson
- Picked by: Arizona Diamondbacks

Regular season
- Season MVP: AL: Josh Donaldson (TOR); NL: Bryce Harper (WSH)

Postseason
- AL champions: Kansas City Royals
- AL runners-up: Toronto Blue Jays
- NL champions: New York Mets
- NL runners-up: Chicago Cubs

World Series
- Champions: Kansas City Royals
- Runners-up: New York Mets
- World Series MVP: Salvador Pérez (KC)

MLB seasons
- ← 2014 2016 →

Locations of AL teams for the 2013–2019 MLB seasons
West Central East
Locations of NL teams for the 2013–2016 MLB seasons
West Central East

The 2015 Major League Baseball season began on April 5 with a Sunday night game between the St. Louis Cardinals and the Chicago Cubs at Wrigley Field, and ended on November 1 with the Kansas City Royals winning the World Series. This was Rob Manfred's first season serving as Commissioner of Baseball.

The Major League Baseball All-Star Game's 86th edition was held on Tuesday, July 14 at Great American Ball Park in Cincinnati, Ohio, home of the Cincinnati Reds. The American League won the game 6–3, to give the American League home-field advantage in the World Series.

== Standings ==
=== American League ===
AL East
Team	W	L	Pct.	GB	Home	Road
^{(2)} Toronto Blue Jays	93	69	.574	—	53‍–‍28	40‍–‍41
^{(4)} New York Yankees	87	75	.537	6	45‍–‍36	42‍–‍39
Baltimore Orioles	81	81	.500	12	47‍–‍31	34‍–‍50
Tampa Bay Rays	80	82	.494	13	42‍–‍42	38‍–‍40
Boston Red Sox	78	84	.481	15	43‍–‍38	35‍–‍46

AL Central
Team	W	L	Pct.	GB	Home	Road
^{(1)} Kansas City Royals	95	67	.586	—	51‍–‍30	44‍–‍37
Minnesota Twins	83	79	.512	12	46‍–‍35	37‍–‍44
Cleveland Indians	81	80	.503	13½	39‍–‍41	42‍–‍39
Chicago White Sox	76	86	.469	19	40‍–‍41	36‍–‍45
Detroit Tigers	74	87	.460	20½	38‍–‍43	36‍–‍44

AL West
Team	W	L	Pct.	GB	Home	Road
^{(3)} Texas Rangers	88	74	.543	—	43‍–‍38	45‍–‍36
^{(5)} Houston Astros	86	76	.531	2	53‍–‍28	33‍–‍48
Los Angeles Angels	85	77	.525	3	49‍–‍32	36‍–‍45
Seattle Mariners	76	86	.469	12	36‍–‍45	40‍–‍41
Oakland Athletics	68	94	.420	20	34‍–‍47	34‍–‍47

=== National League ===
NL East
Team	W	L	Pct.	GB	Home	Road
^{(3)} New York Mets	90	72	.556	—	49‍–‍32	41‍–‍40
Washington Nationals	83	79	.512	7	46‍–‍35	37‍–‍44
Miami Marlins	71	91	.438	19	41‍–‍40	30‍–‍51
Atlanta Braves	67	95	.414	23	42‍–‍39	25‍–‍56
Philadelphia Phillies	63	99	.389	27	37‍–‍44	26‍–‍55

NL Central
Team	W	L	Pct.	GB	Home	Road
^{(1)} St. Louis Cardinals	100	62	.617	—	55‍–‍26	45‍–‍36
^{(4)} Pittsburgh Pirates	98	64	.605	2	53‍–‍28	45‍–‍36
^{(5)} Chicago Cubs	97	65	.599	3	49‍–‍32	48‍–‍33
Milwaukee Brewers	68	94	.420	32	34‍–‍47	34‍–‍47
Cincinnati Reds	64	98	.395	36	34‍–‍47	30‍–‍51

NL West
Team	W	L	Pct.	GB	Home	Road
^{(2)} Los Angeles Dodgers	92	70	.568	—	55‍–‍26	37‍–‍44
San Francisco Giants	84	78	.519	8	47‍–‍34	37‍–‍44
Arizona Diamondbacks	79	83	.488	13	39‍–‍42	40‍–‍41
San Diego Padres	74	88	.457	18	39‍–‍42	35‍–‍46
Colorado Rockies	68	94	.420	24	36‍–‍45	32‍–‍49

== Postseason ==
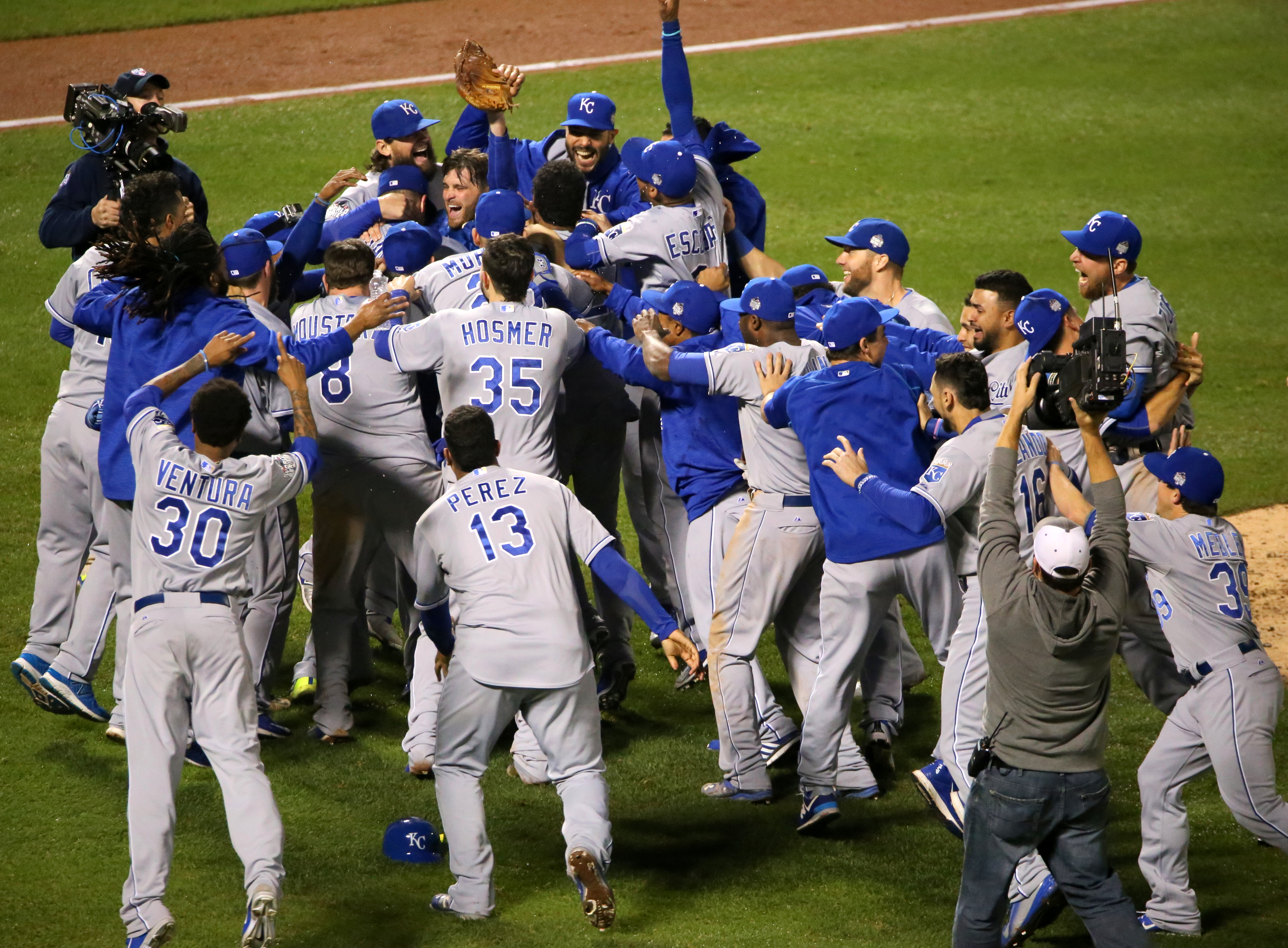
Players of the Kansas City Royals celebrating their World Series victory.

=== Bracket ===
Wild Card Game (ALWC, NLWC)
4	NY Yankees	0
5	Houston	1
4	Pittsburgh	0
5	Chicago Cubs	1

Division Series (ALDS, NLDS)
1	Kansas City	3
5	Houston	2
American League
2	Toronto	3
3	Texas	2
1	St. Louis	1
5	Chicago Cubs	3
National League
2	LA Dodgers	2
3	NY Mets	3

League Championship Series (ALCS, NLCS)
1	Kansas City	4
2	Toronto	2
5	Chicago Cubs	0
3	NY Mets	4

World Series
AL1	Kansas City	4
NL3	NY Mets	1

== Schedule ==
As was the case in 2014, teams were scheduled to play 19 games against each division opponent for a total of 76 games, and six or seven games against each team from the other two divisions in its league for a total of 66 games.

All teams were scheduled to play 20 interleague games throughout the season. For 2015, the interleague matchups were AL East vs. NL East, AL Central vs. NL Central, and AL West vs. NL West. Since "natural rivalry" matchups will be part of the three-year divisional rotation (for the first time), the schedule format for interleague games was different from previous years. The 20 interleague games each team played consisted of two three-game series (one home, one away) against its natural rival (total of six games), two two-game series (one home, one away) against each team for two other opponents (total of eight games; one of the matchups took place back-to-back within the same week), and a single three-game series against each team for the last two (one home, one away; total of six games).

During the final day of the regular season, all games were scheduled to start simultaneously at 3:00 p.m. Eastern Time, reminiscent of the English Premier League's last-day "Survival Sunday" scheduling. MLB hoped that this would add excitement and drama during the final day, and also limit teams' ability to rest starters at the last minute based on early game results.

== Managerial changes ==
=== General managers ===
==== Offseason ====
Team	Former GM	New GM	Reason for leaving	Story/Accomplishments
Colorado Rockies	Dan O'Dowd	Jeff Bridich	Resigned	O'Dowd resigned as general manager on October 8, 2014, after 15 seasons at the position, and Bridich was immediately named his replacement. Bridich spent 10 seasons in the Rockies' front office before becoming the general manager.
Tampa Bay Rays	Andrew Friedman	Matt Silverman	Resigned	On October 14, 2014, it was announced that Friedman would leave the Rays to become the president of baseball operations for the Los Angeles Dodgers.
Los Angeles Dodgers	Ned Colletti	Farhan Zaidi	Promoted	On October 14, 2014, Colletti was removed from his position as general manager of the Dodgers but would remain with them in a new position of senior advisor to the president. Former Rays GM Andrew Friedman was named president of baseball operations the same day. He hired Farhan Zaidi to be the new GM.

==== In-season ====
Date	Team	Former GM	New GM	Reason for leaving	Former job
July 1	Los Angeles Angels	Jerry Dipoto	Bill Stoneman	Resigned	Jerry Dipoto Resigned on July 1 Bill Stoneman was named interim General Manager until the night of October 4. The night after the 2015 baseball regular season ended.
August 4	Detroit Tigers	Dave Dombrowski	Al Avila	Fired	Avila was the assistant General Manager before being promoted to executive vice president of baseball operations and General Manager.
August 11	Milwaukee Brewers	Doug Melvin	David Stearns	Resigned	Stearns was the assistant General Manager for the Houston Astros.
August 18	Boston Red Sox	Ben Cherington	Mike Hazen	Resigned	Cherington stepped down as the general manager of Red Sox on August 18. Dombrowski then was hired as the president of baseball operations and hired Hazen on September 24 as the new general manager. Hazen was the assistant general manager for the last four years.
August 28	Seattle Mariners	Jack Zduriencik	Jeff Kingston	Fired	Kingston, who has been the team's assistant general manager since 2009, will handle the GM duties for the remainder of the season.
September 10	Philadelphia Phillies	Rubén Amaro, Jr.	Scott Proefrock (Interim)	Fired	Amaro, whose contract was set to expire after this season, was fired after seven seasons as general manager. Assistant GM Scott Proefrock was named interim GM during the search for a permanent general manager.

=== Field managers ===
==== Offseason ====
At the end of the 2014 season, the following teams made replacements to their managers.

Team	Former Manager	Interim Manager	Reason for leaving	New Manager	Story/Accomplishments
Houston Astros	Bo Porter	Tom Lawless	Fired	A. J. Hinch	Porter was fired on September 1, 2014, along with bench coach Dave Trembley. Lawless was named the interim manager. Porter finished with a record of 110–190 in under two seasons. A. J. Hinch was announced as the new manager on September 29, 2014.
Texas Rangers	Ron Washington	Tim Bogar	Resigned	Jeff Banister	Washington resigned on September 5, 2014, for personal reasons, later revealed to be an affair, after eight seasons with the Rangers. He finished with a 664–611 record and is the franchise's all-time leader in regular seasons wins and games managed. Washington led the Rangers to four straight 90 win seasons, three playoff appearances, and back to back American League championships during his tenure. Banister was named the manager on October 16, 2014.
Arizona Diamondbacks	Kirk Gibson	Alan Trammell	Fired	Chip Hale	Gibson was fired on September 26, 2014, after four years as manager of the Diamondbacks. He finished with a 353–375 record and led the Diamondbacks to the division title during the 2011 season while capturing the National League Manager of the Year award. Former Athletics and Mets coach Chip Hale was named manager on October 13, 2014.
Minnesota Twins	Ron Gardenhire	N/A	Fired	Paul Molitor	Gardenhire was fired on September 29, 2014, after 13 years as manager of the Twins. He finished with a 1,068–1,039 record and led the Twins to six division titles and was American League Manager of the Year after the 2010 season. Paul Molitor was announced as the new manager of the Twins on November 4, 2014.
Tampa Bay Rays	Joe Maddon	N/A	Resigned	Kevin Cash	Maddon exercised an opt-out clause on October 24, 2014, and resigned from the Rays. He managed them for nine years and finished with a 754–704 record with two division titles and led them to four post-season berths and the 2008 World Series. Maddon was American League Manager of the Year after the 2008 and 2011 seasons. On December 5, 2014, Kevin Cash was named the new manager of the Rays.
Chicago Cubs	Rick Renteria	N/A	Fired	Joe Maddon	Rentería finished the season with a 73–89 record. He was fired on October 31, 2014. Former Tampa Bay Rays manager Joe Maddon was hired as his replacement.

==== In-season ====
Date	Team	Former manager	Interim manager	Reason for leaving	New manager	Story/Accomplishments
May 3	Milwaukee Brewers	Ron Roenicke	N/A	Fired	Craig Counsell	Roenicke was fired after starting the season with a 7–18 record, which was the worst record in baseball at the time. Roenicke in four-plus seasons finished with a 342–331 record. Counsell, with no managerial experience, was most recently a special assistant to Brewers GM Doug Melvin.
May 17	Miami Marlins	Mike Redmond	Dan Jennings	Fired	Don Mattingly	Redmond was fired after starting the season with a 16–22 record and finished with a 155–207 record in a little over two seasons. Bench coach Rob Leary was also dismissed. Jennings, who was the current general manager for the Marlins, moved from the front office to the managerial position. Jennings has no previous managerial experience.
June 15	San Diego Padres	Bud Black	Pat Murphy	Fired	Andy Green	Black was fired during his ninth season as Padres manager after starting the season with a 32–33 record. During this time, he accumulated a 649–713 record with his best finish during the 2010 season where the Padres finished in second place. Black was the 2010 National League Manager of the Year. On June 16, Murphy was named the interim manager for the rest of the 2015 season.
June 26	Philadelphia Phillies	Ryne Sandberg	Pete Mackanin	Resigned	Pete Mackanin	Sandberg resigned on June 26 with a career record of 119–159 after becoming manager in August 2013. The Phillies were 26–48 this season. Pete Mackanin, the third-base coach, has been named interim manager. On September 22 Mackanin had the interim tag removed and was named the manager for the 2016 season with a club option for 2017 season.
August 14	Boston Red Sox	John Farrell	Torey Lovullo	Leave of Absence	John Farrell	Farrell was diagnosed with Stage 1 lymphoma, but considers his condition "very curable." Bench Coach Lovullo served as interim manager for the remainder of the season.

== League leaders ==
=== American League ===
Hitting leaders
Stat	Player	Total
AVG	Miguel Cabrera (DET)	.338
OPS	Mike Trout (LAA)	.991
HR	Chris Davis (BAL)	47
RBI	Josh Donaldson (TOR)	123
R	Josh Donaldson (TOR)	122
H	Jose Altuve (HOU)	200
SB	Jose Altuve (HOU)	38

Pitching leaders
Stat	Player	Total
W	Dallas Keuchel (HOU)	20
L	Corey Kluber (CLE)	16
ERA	David Price (DET/TOR)	2.45
K	Chris Sale (CWS)	274
IP	Dallas Keuchel (HOU)	232.0
SV	Brad Boxberger (TB)	41
WHIP	Dallas Keuchel (HOU)	1.017

=== National League ===
Hitting leaders
Stat	Player	Total
AVG	Dee Gordon (MIA)	.333
OPS	Bryce Harper (WSH)	1.109
HR	Nolan Arenado (COL); Bryce Harper (WSH)	42
RBI	Nolan Arenado (COL)	130
R	Bryce Harper (WSH)	118
H	Dee Gordon (MIA)	205
SB	Dee Gordon (MIA)	58

Pitching leaders
Stat	Player	Total
W	Jake Arrieta (CHC)	22
L	Shelby Miller (ATL)	17
ERA	Zack Greinke (LAD)	1.66
K	Clayton Kershaw (LAD)	301
IP	Clayton Kershaw (LAD)	232.2
SV	Mark Melancon (PIT)	51
WHIP	Zack Greinke (LAD)	0.844

== Milestones ==
=== Batters ===
- Paulo Orlando (KC):
  - Became the first player since 1900 to record triples for his first three big league hits.
- Giancarlo Stanton (MIA):
  - Became the Marlins franchise leader in home runs after hitting his 155th career home run against the New York Mets on April 16. Stanton passed Dan Uggla to become the franchise leader.
- Mike Trout (LAA):
  - Became the youngest player in Major League history with 100 home runs and 100 stolen bases after hitting two home runs against the Houston Astros on April 17. At 23 years and 253 days old, Trout became the youngest player in history to reach the feat and broke the mark set by Alex Rodriguez (23 years, 309 days old).
- José Bautista (TOR):
  - Recorded his 250th career home run in the seventh inning against the Baltimore Orioles on April 21. He became the 210th player to reach this mark.
- David Ortiz (BOS):
  - Recorded his 550th career double in the eighth inning against the Toronto Blue Jays on April 28. He became the 27th player to reach this mark.
  - Recorded his 500th career home run in the fifth inning against the Tampa Bay Rays on September 12. He became the 27th player to reach this mark.
- Alex Rodriguez (NYY):
  - Tied Willie Mays for fourth all-time career home runs by hitting his 660th home run in the eighth inning against the Boston Red Sox on May 1. Rodriguez hit his home run off of Junichi Tazawa. Rodriguez passed Mays by hitting his 661st home run against the Baltimore Orioles on May 7. He hit his home run off of Chris Tillman.
  - Recorded his 2,000th career RBI with a two-run home run in the sixth inning against the Baltimore Orioles on June 13. He became the fourth player to reach this mark.
  - Recorded his 3,000th career hit with a home run in the first inning off of Justin Verlander and the Detroit Tigers on June 19. He became the 29th player to reach this mark.
  - Scored his 2,000th career run in the third inning on Carlos Beltrán's home run against the Chicago White Sox on September 24. He became the eighth player to reach this mark. Rodriguez also became the second player in Major League history to amass at least 3,000 hits, 2,000 RBIs and 2,000 runs scored in his career, joining Hank Aaron.
- Adrián Beltré (TEX):
  - Recorded his 400th career home run in the first inning against the Cleveland Indians on May 15. He became the 52nd player to reach this mark.
  - Tied a Major League record with his third career cycle on August 2. He becomes the fourth player to achieve this feat joining John Reilly, Babe Herman and Bob Meusel.
  - Became the all-time leader in games played for among natives of the Dominican Republic, passing Julio Franco with his 2,528th game played on August 23 against the Detroit Tigers.
  - Recorded his 550th career double in the ninth inning against the Oakland Athletics on September 12. He became the 28th player to reach this mark.
- Miguel Cabrera (DET):
  - Recorded his 400th career home run in the first inning against the St. Louis Cardinals on May 16. He became the 53rd player to reach this mark. Cabrera also became the all-time leader among Venezuelan-born players, passing Andrés Galarraga.
  - Recorded his 1,426th career RBI on August 16 to pass Andrés Galarraga for the most RBIs by a Venezuelan-born player.
- Adrián González (LAD):
  - Recorded his 1,000 career RBI on a two-run homer off Julio Teherán of the Atlanta Braves on May 27. He became the 279th player to reach this mark.
- Matt Holliday (STL):
  - Set National League record with 45 consecutive games to reach base to start a season on June 1 against the Milwaukee Brewers.
- Adam LaRoche (CWS):
  - Recorded his 250th career home run in the ninth inning against the Detroit Tigers on June 5. He became the 211th player to reach this mark.
- Prince Fielder (TEX):
  - Recorded his 300th career home run in the first inning against the Toronto Blue Jays on June 26. He became the 138th player to reach this mark. Prince and his father Cecil become the second father-son duo in Major League history to notch 300-plus homers, the other being Bobby and Barry Bonds.
- Curtis Granderson (NYM):
  - Recorded his 250th career home run in the third inning against the Cincinnati Reds on June 27. He became the 212th player to reach this mark.
- Ryan Howard (PHI):
  - Recorded his 350th career home run in the second inning against the Miami Marlins on July 19. He became the 92nd player to reach this mark.
- Albert Pujols (LAA):
  - Recorded his 550th career home run in the ninth inning against the Houston Astros on July 29. He became the 15th player to reach this mark. Pujols home run, which was his 30th of the season, became the sixth player in Major League history to log 13 career 30-homer seasons joining Hank Aaron, Barry Bonds, Alex Rodriguez, Babe Ruth and Mike Schmidt.
- Edwin Encarnación (TOR):
  - Recorded his 250th career home run in the third inning against the Minnesota Twins on August 6. He became the 213th player to reach this mark.
- Ryan Braun (MIL):
  - Recorded his 250th career home run in the first inning against the Chicago Cubs on August 12. He became the 214th player to reach this mark.
  - Became the Brewers' franchise leader in home runs by hitting his 252nd home run in the sixth inning on August 19 against the Miami Marlins. Robin Yount previously held the franchise record.
- Jimmy Rollins (LAD):
  - Recorded his 500th career double in the sixth inning against the Houston Astros on August 22. He became the 60th player to reach this mark.
- Carlos Beltrán (NYY):
  - Recorded his 500th career double in the fifth inning against the Boston Red Sox on August 31. He became the 61st player to reach this mark.
- Torii Hunter (MIN):
  - Recorded his 350th career home run in the first inning against the Chicago White Sox on September 13. He became the 93rd player to reach this mark.
- José Abreu (CWS):
  - Became the second player in Major League history to record at least 30 home runs and 100 RBIs in each of his first two seasons. Abreu reached these numbers by driving in two runs in the seventh inning against the Kansas City Royals on October 1. He joins Albert Pujols who accomplished this during the 2001 and 2002 seasons.
- Carlos Correa (HOU):
  - Set the Astros' franchise record for most home runs by a rookie when he hit his 22nd of the season on October 1 against the Arizona Diamondbacks. He broke the record that was set by Lance Berkman in 2000.
- Adalberto Mondesi (KC):
  - Became the first major-leaguer to make his debut in the World Series when he pinch-hit for Danny Duffy in Game 3 of the 2015 World Series.

=== Pitchers ===
==== No-hitters ====
- Chris Heston (SF):
  - The rookie threw his first career no-hitter in defeating the New York Mets 5–0 on June 9. This was the 17th no-hitter in Giants franchise history. Heston struck out 11 batters and did not walk anyone in the game while throwing 110 pitches. The three batters that he hit were the only runners that he allowed to reach base.
- Max Scherzer (WSH):
  - Threw his first career no-hitter in defeating the Pittsburgh Pirates 6–0 on June 20. This was the sixth no-hitter in the Expos/Nationals franchise history, and second since the Nationals' move to Washington, D.C. Scherzer struck out ten batters while throwing 106 pitches. Only one man reached base via being hit with a pitch with two outs in the ninth inning. Scherzer was one strike away from a perfect game.
  - Threw his second career no-hitter in defeating the New York Mets 2–0 on October 3. Scherzer struck out 17 batters, the most ever in a no-hitter, while throwing just 109 pitches. The only blemish was when Kevin Plawecki reached on a throwing error by Yunel Escobar leading off the sixth inning. Scherzer becomes the first pitcher to toss two no-hitters in a regular season since Nolan Ryan in 1973 and the fifth all-time. He also became the first pitcher in Major League history to throw two no-hitters without walking a batter.
- Cole Hamels (TEX)/(PHI):
  - Threw his first career no-hitter in defeating the Chicago Cubs 5–0 on July 25. This was the 13th no-hitter in Phillies franchise history. Hamels struck out 13 batters and walked two batters while throwing 129 pitches.
- Hisashi Iwakuma (SEA):
  - Threw his first career no-hitter in defeating the Baltimore Orioles 3–0 on August 12. This was the fifth no-hitter in Mariners franchise history. Iwakuma struck out seven batters, and walked three while throwing 116 pitches. Iwakuma also becomes the second Japanese pitcher to throw a no-hitter in the Major League history joining Hideo Nomo.
- Mike Fiers (HOU)/(MIL):
  - Threw his first career no-hitter in defeating the Los Angeles Dodgers 3–0 on August 21. This was the 11th no-hitter in Astros franchise history. Fiers struck out ten batters, and walked three while throwing 134 pitches. Fiers also became the first player to throw a no-hitter after being traded during the season since Jim Bibby in 1973.
- Jake Arrieta (CHC):
  - Threw his first career no-hitter in defeating the Los Angeles Dodgers 2–0 on August 30. This was the 14th no-hitter in Cubs franchise history. Arrieta struck out 12 batters and walked one while throwing 116 pitches.

==== Other pitching accomplishments ====
- Mark Buehrle (TOR):
  - Recorded his 200th career win with a victory against the Baltimore Orioles on April 10. He became the 116th player to reach this mark.
- Francisco Rodríguez (MIL):
  - Recorded his 350th career save by closing out a 4–2 victory against the Cincinnati Reds on April 23. He became the tenth player to reach this mark.
- Félix Hernández (SEA):
  - Recorded his 2,000th career strikeout by striking out Sam Fuld of the Oakland Athletics in the fifth inning on May 10. He became the 73rd player to reach this mark.
- Jonathan Papelbon (WSH)/(PHI):
  - Became the Phillies' franchise leader in saves by closing out a win against the Pittsburgh Pirates on May 13.
- Jorge de la Rosa (COL):
  - Became the all-time Rockies' leader in strikeouts with his 774th on May 21 against the Philadelphia Phillies. He struck out Freddy Galvis in the third inning to surpass Ubaldo Jiménez.
  - Became the all-time Rockies' leader in wins with his 73rd on June 14 against the Miami Marlins. His victory surpassed the team record that was held by Aaron Cook.
- CC Sabathia (NYY):
  - Recorded his 2,500th career strikeout by striking out Johnny Giavotella of the Los Angeles Angels of Anaheim in the fifth inning on June 7. He became the 31st player to reach this mark.
- Craig Kimbrel (SD):
  - Recorded his 200th career save by closing out a 5–3 victory against the Atlanta Braves on June 8. He became the 47th player to reach this mark. Kimbrel reached the 200-save mark in his 318th major-league game, 41 games quicker than any other pitcher has hit that plateau. (The old record was 359 games by Papelbon.) Kimbrel posted his 200th save only 11 days after his 27th birthday. He's the second-youngest pitcher at the time of his 200th career save, behind Francisco Rodriguez, who hit that milestone with the Angels on September 2, 2008, at age 26 years, 239 days.
- Steven Matz (NYM):
  - Became the first pitcher in Major League history to knock in four-plus RBIs in his major league debut.
- Aroldis Chapman (CIN):
  - Struck out five Cleveland Indians on July 19, which gave him 500 strikeouts for his career in 292 innings. This set a Major League record for the fastest pitcher to reach 500 career strikeouts as he broke the record of 305 innings that was held by Craig Kimbrel.
- Huston Street (LAA):
  - Recorded his 300th career save by closing out a 5–2 victory against the Minnesota Twins on July 22. He became the 27th player to reach this mark.
- Joakim Soria (PIT)/(DET):
  - Recorded his 200th career save by closing out a 9–4 victory against the Seattle Mariners on July 22. He became the 48th player to reach this mark.
- Dan Haren (CHC)/(MIA):
  - Recorded his 150th career win with a victory against the Milwaukee Brewers on August 11. He became the 252nd player to reach this mark.
  - Recorded his 2,000th career strikeout by striking out Brian Bogusevic of the Philadelphia Phillies in the first inning on September 13. He became the 74th player to reach this mark.
- Max Scherzer (WSH):
  - Set the Nationals' record for strikeouts by striking out Jonathan Schoop of the Baltimore Orioles for number 243. This broke the Nationals' record that was set by Stephen Strasburg in 2014.
- A. J. Burnett (PIT):
  - Recorded his 2,500th career strikeout by striking out Jorge Soler of the Chicago Cubs in the first inning on September 27. He became the 32nd player to reach this mark.
- Dallas Keuchel (HOU):
  - Became the first pitcher in Major League history to go undefeated with at least 14 wins at home in one season. Keuchel finished 15–0 in his 18 starts at Minute Maid Park.
- Chris Sale (CWS):
  - Set the White Sox single-season mark for strikeouts with his 270th strike out in the second inning against the Detroit Tigers on October 2. His strikeout of James McCann broke the record that was set in 1908 by Ed Walsh.

=== Miscellaneous ===
- On April 29, for the first time in Major League Baseball history, the Baltimore Orioles and the Chicago White Sox played before an empty stadium because of the civil unrest in the city. Fans were not allowed in the stadium, though some watched from outside. The Orioles won, 8–2.
- On August 11, for the first time in Major League history, all 15 home teams won on the same day. Prior to this, the most games ever won by home teams on the same day was 12 games. That record came more than a century ago, on May 23, 1914, according to Elias Sports Bureau.
- On August 9, the New York Yankees Major League record of 2,665 consecutive games played without having been held scoreless, in back-to-back contests, was snapped when Toronto Blue Jays pitcher Marco Estrada tossed a 2–0 shutout win at Yankee Stadium. Left-handed pitcher David Price blanked New York, 6–0, on the previous day.
- On August 13, the Toronto Blue Jays became the first Major League franchise since the 1954 Cleveland Indians to have compiled two different 11-game winning streaks within the same season.
- On September 19, Mike Matheny of the St. Louis Cardinals became the first manager in MLB history to guide his club to a playoff appearance in each of his first four seasons as manager.
- On October 1, the New York Yankees made the postseason for the 52nd time in franchise history with their 4–1 victory against the Boston Red Sox. The win also coincided with the 10,000th victory in franchise history, becoming the eighth Major League and first American League club to attain this feat.
- On October 12, the Chicago Cubs set a postseason record for most home runs hit during a game by hitting six against the St. Louis Cardinals. Also, there were a total of 21 home runs hit which also set a single-day postseason record.

== Awards and honors ==
=== Regular season ===
Baseball Writers' Association of America Awards
BBWAA Award	National League	American League
Rookie of the Year	Kris Bryant (CHC)	Carlos Correa (HOU)
Cy Young Award	Jake Arrieta (CHC)	Dallas Keuchel (HOU)
Manager of the Year	Joe Maddon (CHC)	Jeff Banister (TEX)
Most Valuable Player	Bryce Harper (WSH)	Josh Donaldson (TOR)
Gold Glove Awards
Position	National League	American League
Pitcher	Zack Greinke (LAD)	Dallas Keuchel (HOU)
Catcher	Yadier Molina (STL)	Salvador Pérez (KC)
1st Base	Paul Goldschmidt (AZ)	Eric Hosmer (KC)
2nd Base	Dee Gordon (MIA)	Jose Altuve (HOU)
3rd Base	Nolan Arenado (COL)	Manny Machado (BAL)
Shortstop	Brandon Crawford (SF)	Alcides Escobar (KC)
Left field	Starling Marte (PIT)	Yoenis Céspedes (DET)
Center field	A. J. Pollock (AZ)	Kevin Kiermaier (TB)
Right field	Jason Heyward (STL)	Kole Calhoun (LAA)
Silver Slugger Awards
Pitcher/Designated Hitter	Madison Bumgarner (SF)	Kendrys Morales (KC)
Catcher	Buster Posey (SF)	Brian McCann (NYY)
1st Base	Paul Goldschmidt (AZ)	Miguel Cabrera (DET)
2nd Base	Dee Gordon (MIA)	Jose Altuve (HOU)
3rd Base	Nolan Arenado (COL)	Josh Donaldson (TOR)
Shortstop	Brandon Crawford (SF)	Xander Bogaerts (BOS)
Left Field	Carlos González (COL)	J. D. Martinez (DET)
Center Field	Andrew McCutchen (PIT)	Mike Trout (LAA)
Right Field	Bryce Harper (WSH)	Nelson Cruz (SEA)

=== Other awards ===
- The Sporting News Player of the Year Award: Josh Donaldson (TOR)
- Comeback Players of the Year: Prince Fielder (TEX, American); Matt Harvey (NYM, National)
- Edgar Martínez Award (Best designated hitter): Kendrys Morales (KC)
- Hank Aaron Award: Josh Donaldson (TOR, American); Bryce Harper (WSH, National)
- Roberto Clemente Award (Humanitarian): Andrew McCutchen (PIT)
- Mariano Rivera AL Reliever of the Year Award (Best AL reliever): Andrew Miller (NYY)
- Trevor Hoffman NL Reliever of the Year Award (Best NL reliever): Mark Melancon (PIT)
- Warren Spahn Award (Best left-handed pitcher): Dallas Keuchel (HOU)

Fielding Bible Awards
Position	Player
Pitcher	Dallas Keuchel (HOU)
Catcher	Buster Posey (SF)
1st Base	Paul Goldschmidt (AZ)
2nd Base	Ian Kinsler (DET)
3rd Base	Nolan Arenado (COL)
Shortstop	Andrelton Simmons (ATL)
Left Field	Starling Marte (PIT)
Center Field	Kevin Kiermaier (TB)
Right Field	Jason Heyward (STL)
Multi-position	Ender Inciarte (AZ)

=== Monthly awards ===
==== Player of the Month ====
Month	American League	National League
April	Nelson Cruz	Adrián González
May	Jason Kipnis	Bryce Harper
June	Albert Pujols	Giancarlo Stanton
July	Mike Trout	Carlos González
August	Edwin Encarnación	Andrew McCutchen
September	Shin-Soo Choo	Nolan Arenado

==== Pitcher of the Month ====
Month	American League	National League
April	Dallas Keuchel	Gerrit Cole
May	Dallas Keuchel	Max Scherzer
June	Chris Sale	Max Scherzer
July	Scott Kazmir	Clayton Kershaw
August	Dallas Keuchel	Jake Arrieta
September	Cody Anderson	Jake Arrieta

==== Rookie of the Month ====
Month	American League	National League
April	Devon Travis	Alex Guerrero
May	Delino DeShields, Jr.	Kris Bryant
June	Carlos Correa	Maikel Franco
July	Andrew Heaney	Jung Ho Kang
August	Miguel Sano	Kris Bryant
September	Francisco Lindor	Justin Bour

== Home field attendance and payroll ==
Team name	Wins	%±	Home attendance	%±	Per game	Est. payroll	%±
Los Angeles Dodgers	92	−2.1%	3,764,815	−0.5%	46,479	$265,140,429	13.6%
St. Louis Cardinals	100	11.1%	3,520,889	−0.6%	43,468	$128,241,500	−1.3%
San Francisco Giants	84	−4.5%	3,375,882	0.2%	41,678	$180,018,166	10.1%
New York Yankees	87	3.6%	3,193,795	−6.1%	39,430	$214,051,957	−17.1%
Los Angeles Angels of Anaheim	85	−13.3%	3,012,765	−2.7%	37,195	$131,522,500	2.2%
Chicago Cubs	97	32.9%	2,919,122	10.1%	36,039	$115,306,610	92.8%
Boston Red Sox	78	9.9%	2,880,694	−2.6%	35,564	$183,931,900	36.6%
Toronto Blue Jays	93	12.0%	2,794,891	17.7%	34,505	$117,917,400	−13.6%
Detroit Tigers	74	−17.8%	2,726,048	−6.6%	33,655	$172,284,750	1.9%
Kansas City Royals	95	6.7%	2,708,549	38.4%	33,439	$121,590,475	35.4%
Washington Nationals	83	−13.5%	2,619,843	1.6%	32,344	$176,496,372	28.6%
New York Mets	90	13.9%	2,569,753	19.6%	31,725	$98,874,473	19.6%
Milwaukee Brewers	68	−17.1%	2,542,558	−9.1%	31,390	$70,869,500	−35.3%
Colorado Rockies	68	3.0%	2,506,789	−6.5%	30,948	$96,438,600	1.1%
Pittsburgh Pirates	98	11.4%	2,498,596	2.3%	30,847	$104,457,499	29.4%
Texas Rangers	88	31.3%	2,491,875	−8.3%	30,764	$178,860,789	37.8%
San Diego Padres	74	−3.9%	2,459,752	12.0%	30,367	$125,203,700	63.3%
Cincinnati Reds	64	−15.8%	2,419,506	−2.3%	29,870	$111,572,286	9.1%
Baltimore Orioles	81	−15.6%	2,281,202	−7.4%	29,246	$112,989,833	3.6%
Minnesota Twins	83	18.6%	2,220,054	−1.4%	27,408	$107,755,000	23.8%
Seattle Mariners	76	−12.6%	2,193,581	6.3%	27,081	$130,681,400	36.9%
Houston Astros	86	22.9%	2,153,585	22.9%	26,587	$93,256,200	108.5%
Arizona Diamondbacks	79	23.4%	2,080,145	0.3%	25,681	$64,434,000	−28.3%
Atlanta Braves	67	−15.2%	2,001,392	−15.0%	24,709	$104,037,500	−3.7%
Philadelphia Phillies	63	−13.7%	1,831,080	−24.5%	22,606	$103,082,167	−41.6%
Oakland Athletics	68	−22.7%	1,768,175	−11.8%	21,829	$64,016,001	−28.2%
Chicago White Sox	76	4.1%	1,755,810	6.4%	21,677	$112,889,700	29.1%
Miami Marlins	71	−7.8%	1,752,235	1.2%	21,633	$71,231,500	68.1%
Cleveland Indians	81	−4.7%	1,388,905	−3.4%	17,361	$59,163,766	−19.5%
Tampa Bay Rays	80	3.9%	1,287,054	−11.0%	15,322	$64,571,233	−17.0%

== Uniforms ==
=== Wholesale changes ===
The New York Mets changed their home jersey from a cream shade to white and took away the home white alternate jersey.

The Minnesota Twins took away the pinstripes from their home jersey and added a gold trim to the "Twins" wordmark. A hat was also added highlighting the "Twin Cities" logo in gold.

The Pittsburgh Pirates introduced a new camouflage alternate jersey in honor of the U.S. Military which will be worn during all Thursday home games. A new camo-style hat also accompanies this uniform with a black bill and black "Pittsburgh" logo.

The Seattle Mariners have added an alternate cream color jersey with blue and yellow, the original colors of the team from 1977–1992. An alternate light blue hat with a gold "Seattle" logo will accompany the uniform as well.

The San Francisco Giants have added an alternate black jersey, featuring a new alternate logo depicting the Golden Gate Bridge.

The Cleveland Indians darkened the shade of navy blue in their caps and jerseys.

=== Anniversaries and special events ===
The following teams wore commemorative patches for special occasions:

Team	Special occasion
All 30 teams	Breast cancer patch on May 10, Mother's Day
All 30 teams	Prostate cancer patch on June 21, Father's Day
Arizona Diamondbacks	In memory of ISIS hostage Kayla Mueller (March 3–8)
Arizona Diamondbacks	Retirement of Randy Johnson's #51 (August 8) – on their caps and jerseys
Atlanta Braves	20th Anniversary of 1995 World Series Championship
Chicago White Sox	In memory of Minnie Miñoso
Chicago White Sox	In memory of Billy Pierce (starting August 11)
Chicago White Sox	10th Anniversary of 2005 World Series Championship
Cincinnati Reds	2015 All Star Game
Cincinnati Reds	40th Anniversary of 1975 World Series Championship and 25th Anniversary of 1990 World Series Championship
Cleveland Indians	In memory of Al Rosen
Houston Astros	50th anniversary of the Astrodome as well as team being named the Astros
Houston Astros	In memory of Milo Hamilton (starting September 18)
Kansas City Royals	#28 in memory of Ernie Banks, who played for the Kansas City Monarchs (May 17)
Kansas City Royals	30th anniversary of their winning the 1985 World Series (May 24) – on their caps and jerseys
Minnesota Twins	50th Anniversary of 1965 World Series team
New York Yankees	#28 in memory of Ernie Banks (May 17)
New York Yankees	Retirement of Bernie Williams' #51 (May 24) – on their caps and jerseys
New York Yankees	Retirement of Jorge Posada's #20 (August 22) – on their caps and jerseys
New York Yankees	Retirement of Andy Pettitte's #46 (August 23) – on their caps and jerseys
New York Yankees	In memory of Yogi Berra (starting September 23)
Philadelphia Phillies	In memory of Sara L. Buck
St. Louis Cardinals	In memory of Oscar Taveras
St. Louis Cardinals	70th anniversary of Red Schoendienst's MLB debut (April 17)
San Francisco Giants	In memory of Lon Simmons
San Francisco Giants	2014 World Series champions
Washington Nationals	10th year in Washington, D.C.

=== Throwbacks ===
The Astros and Angels wore 1965 uniforms on April 18 to mark the 50th anniversary of the Astrodome and the 50th anniversary of the renaming of the team to Astros.

The Reds and Cubs wore 1990 uniforms on April 24 to mark the 25th anniversary of the Reds' winning the 1990 World Series.

The Tigers and Indians wore Negro league throwbacks on April 25. The Tigers wore the uniforms of the Detroit Stars, while the Indians wore the uniforms of the Cleveland Buckeyes.

The Red Sox wore their 1975 home uniforms on May 5 to mark the 40th anniversary of the club's 1975 AL Championship and trip to the 1975 World Series. The uniforms had the Massachusetts bicentennial patch.

The Mariners and Red Sox wore Negro league throwbacks on May 16. The Red Sox wore the uniforms of the Boston Royal Giants, and the Mariners wore the uniforms of the Seattle Steelheads.

The Cubs and Royals wore 1915 Federal League throwbacks on May 31 (originally, they were supposed to have worn them on May 30, but the game was postponed due to rain). The Cubs wore the uniforms of the Chicago Whales, while the Royals wore the uniforms of the Kansas City Packers.

The Cardinals and Phillies wore 1960s throwbacks on June 19. The Cardinals wore 1961 uniforms, which did have the players' numbers on the fronts of the shirts. The Phillies wore 1969 throwbacks.

The Mets and Braves wore Negro league throwbacks on June 20. The Mets wore the uniforms of the Brooklyn Royal Giants, while the Braves wore the uniforms of the 1938 Atlanta Black Crackers.

The Red Sox wore their 1975 road uniforms on June 27 against the Rays. The Rays, meanwhile, wore their "fauxback" jerseys, which have a retro feel yet never actually were worn regularly because the franchise did not exist back then.

The Athletics wore 1965 Kansas City Athletics uniforms June 27. Ironically, the Kansas City Royals were their opponents.

The Pirates and Brewers wore Negro league throwbacks on July 18. The Pirates wore the uniforms of the Pittsburgh Crawfords, while the Brewers wore the uniforms of the Milwaukee Bears.

The Rangers and Astros wore 1980s throwbacks on July 18 as part of a 1980s night promotion at Minute Maid Park.

The Cardinals and Royals wore 1985 uniforms on July 23 to mark the 30th anniversary of the 1985 World Series. They were supposed to be worn on June 14, but that game was postponed due to rain.

The Cubs and White Sox wore 1959 uniforms on August 14 in honor of Minnie Miñoso at US Cellular Field. Each of the White Sox players wore Minoso's number 9.

The Cubs and Tigers wore 1945 uniforms on August 19 to mark the 70th anniversary of the 1945 World Series.

The White Sox wore 1976 uniforms on August 27.

=== Other uniforms ===
Players, coaches, and umpires at all games wore #42 on April 15, the 68th anniversary of Jackie Robinson's debut in the majors.

The Giants wore uniforms with gold "Giants" script lettering and numbering on April 18 to celebrate their 2014 World Series title.

On April 20 (Patriots' Day), the Boston Red Sox wore home white jerseys with "BOSTON" written on the front to mark the second anniversary of the Boston Marathon bombings. The uniform also sported the 2013 navy-blue circular patch with a white border on the left shoulder saying "B Strong" (with the red B in the classic font featured on the Red Sox's caps).

The Milwaukee Brewers wore their batting practice jerseys as an alternate on April 21. The front has the Brewers' "M" logo on front, and has gold trim on the side.

The Giants wore Spanish-language "Gigantes" uniforms on May 5, Cinco de Mayo.

The Orioles wore a special uniform May 11, the first game at Camden Yards with spectators since April 26 due to the riots that took place in the city in April. The uniforms were in their home whites, but had their road "Baltimore" script on the front instead of the usual "Orioles".

The Reds wore camouflage uniforms and caps on May 16 and June 6. The uniforms had the "Reds" script on the front, instead of the player's number and the Reds' logo.

All teams wore camouflage uniforms on May 25, Memorial Day in the United States. Although Memorial Day is not a legal holiday in Ontario, the Blue Jays wore camouflage.

The Reds wore green caps and uniforms on June 19 as part of a "Shamrock the Ballpark" promotion. Like the camouflage uniforms, the uniforms had the "Reds" script on the front, instead of the player's number and the Reds' logo; the uniforms have a shamrock on the right sleeve, instead of the Mr. Redlegs mascot.

The Blue Jays wore a special uniform on Canada Day. July 1. The uniform had the Blue Jays wordmark in red, instead of blue. They had the Canadian flag on their right sleeve. The Red Sox, their opponent, wore a Canadian flag on their uniform as well. The uniform was worn again on August 30.

All teams wore American flag-themed caps and uniforms on July 4, Independence Day in the United States. The uniforms had an American flag on a sleeve. The logos and players' numbers had stars on them; the caps had a star instead of a baseball on the MLB logo. The Blue Jays wore a jersey with both the U.S. and Canadian flags.

The Royals and the Astros wore Spanish-language "Los Reales" and "Los Astros" uniforms on July 25.

The Tigers wore Spanish-language "Tigres" uniforms August 8. The uniforms were based on the Tigers' 1960 uniforms.

The Reds and the Diamondbacks wore Spanish-language "Los Rojos" and "Los D-backs" uniforms August 21.

The Mets wore camouflage uniforms on August 31.

The Mariners wore Spanish-language "Marineros" uniforms on September 12.

The Astros wore Spanish-language "Los Astros" uniforms on September 27.

== Television ==
=== National ===
==== United States ====
2015 marks the second year of MLB's eight-year deal with Fox Sports, ESPN, & TBS. Fox will televise Saturday night games for eight consecutive weeks, leading up to the All Star Game, which will also air on Fox. Fox will then televise Saturday afternoon games for the last four weeks of the regular season. Fox Sports 1 will televise games on Tuesday nights and Saturdays, both during the afternoon and at night. ESPN will televise games on its flagship telecast, Sunday Night Baseball, as well as Monday and Wednesday nights. TBS will televise Sunday afternoon games for the last thirteen weeks of the regular season. Fox and ESPN Sunday Night Baseball telecasts will be exclusive; all other national telecasts will be subject to local blackout.

TBS will televise the National League Wild Card Game, Division Series, and Championship Series. ESPN will televise the American League Wild Card Game, Fox Sports 1 and MLB Network will televise American League Division Series, and Fox and Fox Sports 1 will televise the American League Championship Series. The World Series will air exclusively on Fox for the sixteenth consecutive year. All postseason games will air on ESPN Radio.

==== Canada ====
2015 was the second year of MLB's eight-year contracts for national broadcasts in Canada. Rogers Communications-owned Sportsnet holds English-language rights to the All-Star Game and Home Run Derby, almost all postseason games, and various regular season games, all of which are in addition to the channel's Canada-wide "regional" deal for all regular season games of the co-owned Toronto Blue Jays.

With the Blue Jays reaching the postseason in 2015 for the first time since 1993, Sportsnet president Scott Moore announced the channel was unable to produce separate Canadian telecasts of the Blue Jays' postseason games, and picked up the U.S. network telecasts of these games as it typically did for its postseason coverage. As in 2014, when the two Division Series games carried by MLB Network in the U.S. was also exclusive to that channel in Canada despite very limited carriage, Game 3 of the Royals-Astros ALDS was exclusive to MLBN in both countries. However Sportsnet aired all games of the Blue Jays-Rangers ALDS in Canada (MLBN carried Game 2 in the United States).

TSN holds English-language rights to most regular season games in ESPN's U.S. package. French-language rights are split between RDS and TVA Sports.

=== Local ===
The Chicago Cubs opted to re-negotiate their terrestrial television contracts for the 2015 season through 2019, when all the Cubs' television rights contracts will expire, including their cable deal with Comcast SportsNet Chicago. WGN-TV will still hold rights to 45 Cubs games per season, and its overflow broadcasts will move to WPWR-TV in place of WCIU-TV. WGN will be joined by ABC-owned station WLS-TV, which will now broadcast 25 games per season. Broadcast Cubs games among the three stations in the market, along with White Sox games (which will also have games move from WCIU to WPWR) will be carried in the Indianapolis market among Media General's duopoly of WISH-TV and WNDY-TV, in addition to a regional network in Iowa and downstate Illinois.

The cable network WGN America will no longer carry Chicago White Sox or Chicago Cubs games, as the network has phased out Chicago sports programming as part of its transition towards becoming a nationally focused entertainment network. This brings an end to the "superstation" era of cable broadcast, started in 1976 when WTCG (later to become WTBS) broadcast Atlanta Braves games, followed by WGN and other stations such as WOR-TV (New York Mets), WSBK-TV (Boston Red Sox) and KTLA (California Angels) airing simulcasts via satellite or cable.

After an absence of over a decade, New York Yankees telecasts will return to WPIX, sharing time with the Mets after WWOR-TV gave up its contract due to the rejection of a contract extension. Both teams' games on WPIX will still be produced by the YES Network and SportsNet New York respectively.

== Radio ==
ESPN Radio aired its 18th season of national coverage, including Sunday Night Games, Saturday games, Opening Day and holiday games, the All-Star Game, and Home Run Derby, and the entire postseason.

=== Local ===
WBBM became the radio home of the Chicago Cubs starting in April 2015 after long time home WGN gave up the broadcasting rights after 90 years.

WJZ-FM, for the second time, became the flagship radio station for the Baltimore Orioles. WJZ-FM held the rights for the 2009 and 2010 seasons.

== Rule changes ==
New rules were made to increase the pace of the game.

- Managers must initiate all instant replay calls from the dugout.
- Batters must keep at least one foot in the batter's box at all times.
- Games will resume promptly after every commercial break.

== Retirements ==
- Tim Hudson announced that 2015 will be his last season.
- LaTroy Hawkins announced that 2015 would be his last season.
- A. J. Burnett announced that he would retire after the 2015 season.
- Aramis Ramírez announced that he would retire after the 2015 season. He confirmed his retirement on November 5.
- Carlos Quentin announced his retirement on May 1.
- Jeff Karstens announced his retirement on May 3.
- Bruce Chen announced his retirement on May 18.
- Rafael Furcal announced his retirement on May 19.
- Kevin Slowey announced his retirement on June 2.
- Érik Bédard announced his retirement on June 11.
- Dane De La Rosa announced his retirement on June 26.
- Chris Perez announced his retirement on August 22.
- Carlos Peña announced his retirement on September 16.
- Jeremy Affeldt announced his retirement on October 1.
- Barry Zito announced his retirement on October 19.
- Dan Haren announced his retirement on October 22.
- Torii Hunter announced his retirement on October 26.
- Mike Hessman announced his retirement on November 28.
- Michael Cuddyer announced his retirement on December 11.
- Freddy Sanchez announced his retirement on December 21.
- Shaun Marcum announced his retirement on January 18, 2016.
- Freddy García announced his retirement on February 7, 2016. He last pitched in the majors in the 2013 season.
- Rafael Betancourt announced his retirement on February 27, 2016.

== Retired numbers ==
- Don Zimmer's #66 was retired by the Tampa Bay Rays on April 6. It is the third number retired by the organization.
- Former commissioner and Milwaukee Brewers founder/owner Bud Selig had #1 retired by the team on April 6. He became the fifth person to have a number retired by the Brewers.
- Paul Konerko had his #14 retired on May 23 before a game against the Minnesota Twins. He became the 10th player to have his number retired by the Chicago White Sox.
- Bernie Williams had his #51 retired by the New York Yankees on May 24.
- Pedro Martínez had his #45 retired by the Boston Red Sox on July 28. It is the ninth number retired by the organization.
- Randy Johnson had his #51 retired by the Arizona Diamondbacks on August 8. It is the third number retired by the organization.
- Jorge Posada had his #20 retired by the New York Yankees on August 22.
- Andy Pettitte had his #46 retired by the New York Yankees on August 23.

== See also ==
- 2015 Korea Professional Baseball season
- 2015 Nippon Professional Baseball season
