= Peter Bendix =

American baseball executive (born 1985)

Miami Marlins
- President of baseball operations
- Born: August 1985 (age 40); Cleveland, Ohio, U.S.

Teams
- Tampa Bay Rays (2009–2023); Miami Marlins (2024–present)

Peter Bendix (born August 1985) is an American professional baseball front office executive. He is the president of baseball operations for the Miami Marlins of Major League Baseball (MLB).

== Career ==
Bendix attended Tufts University, graduating in 2008 with a major in American Studies. He took a course on sabermetrics at Tufts and his research project resulted in two offers for internships. He joined the Rays as an intern in 2009.

The Rays promoted Bendix to vice president in 2019, and by 2020 his title was vice president of baseball development. Bendix was named general manager of the Rays on December 16, 2021, succeeding Erik Neander, who had been promoted to president of baseball operations.

On November 6, 2023, the Miami Marlins hired Bendix to be their president of baseball operations.

== Personal life ==
Bendix is originally from Cleveland. As a child, he was a fan of the Cleveland Indians.

Sporting positions
Preceded by Erik Neander	Tampa Bay Rays General manager 2022–2023	Succeeded by Vacant
