= Erik Neander =

American baseball executive (born 1983)

Tampa Bay Rays
- President of Baseball Operations
- Born: May 25, 1983 (age 43); Silver Spring, Maryland, U.S.

Teams
- Tampa Bay Rays (2007–present)

Career highlights and awards
- 2× MLB Executive of the Year Award (2019, 2026); 2x Sporting News Executive of the Year (2019, 2026)

Erik Neander (born May 25, 1983) is an American front office executive in Major League Baseball (MLB) for the Tampa Bay Rays. He has worked for the Rays since 2007, and became the team's president of baseball operations in September 2021.

== Career ==
Neander was raised in Oneonta, New York, and attended the local high school, where he played baseball. Neander graduated from Virginia Tech and started working for Baseball Info Solutions, joining the Tampa Bay Rays as an intern in 2007.

Neander was promoted to vice president of baseball operations in October 2014. He succeeded Matthew Silverman as senior vice president and general manager of the Rays in November 2016. He was named recipient of the Sporting News Executive of the Year Award for 2019. He also received the MLB Executive of the Year Award the same year.

On September 8, 2021, Neander signed a multi-year extension with the Rays and was promoted to president of baseball operations. In February 2024, Neander and the Rays agreed to another extension.

After the Rays finished with the best record in the American League in 2026, Neander received his second MLB Executive of the Year Award and his second Sporting News Executive of the Year Award.

== Personal life ==
Neander is married and has three children.

Sporting positions
Preceded by Matthew Silverman	Tampa Bay Rays General Manager; 2017–2021	Succeeded by Peter Bendix
