= Farhan Zaidi =

Canadian baseball executive (born 1976)

Los Angeles Dodgers
- Baseball Executive
- Born: November 11, 1976 (age 50); Sudbury, Ontario, Canada

Teams
- Oakland Athletics (2011–2014) (Assistant General Manager); Los Angeles Dodgers (2014–2018) (General Manager); San Francisco Giants (2018–2024) (President of Baseball Operations); Los Angeles Dodgers (2025–present) (Special Advisor)

Career highlights and awards
- MLB Executive of the Year Award (2021); Sporting News Executive of the Year (2021); World Series champion (2025)

Farhan Zaidi (born November 11, 1976) is a Canadian professional baseball executive. He has previously served as president of baseball operations for the San Francisco Giants, general manager for the Los Angeles Dodgers, and as assistant general manager of the Oakland Athletics of Major League Baseball (MLB). He currently works for the Dodgers as a special advisor and also assists Dodgers owner Mark Walter with his other sports interests.

Zaidi is one of the only Muslim executives in Major League Baseball. He was the first Muslim, Pakistani-Canadian, and, consequently, South Asian-Canadian general manager in Major League Baseball. He was also the first Muslim to run a major North American sports team.

== Early life ==
Zaidi was born on November 11, 1976, in Sudbury, Ontario, Canada, to a family of Pakistani ancestry. His parents, Sadiq and Anjum, raised four children: Zeeshan, Farhan, Noor, and Jaffer. Zaidi grew up in the Philippines after his family moved to Manila when he was four years old, where he attended the International School of Manila.

He has a Bachelor of Science degree from the Massachusetts Institute of Technology and a Doctor of Philosophy (PhD) in economics from the University of California, Berkeley. He briefly worked for the Boston Consulting Group and the Sporting News website between MIT and Berkeley.

== Career ==
=== Oakland Athletics ===
While at Berkeley, Zaidi read the book Moneyball and said that it changed his life. He saw a job posting for a baseball operations position with the Oakland Athletics and sent out his résumé, beating out 1,000 other applicants for the job. He was a data analysis sabermetrics assistant when he started. His boss with the Athletics, Billy Beane, called him "absolutely brilliant" and credited him with the acquisition of Yoenis Céspedes.

For the 2013 season, Zaidi was promoted by the Athletics to the post of director of baseball operations and added assistant general manager to his title in 2014.

=== Los Angeles Dodgers ===
On November 6, 2014, Zaidi was named by the Los Angeles Dodgers as their new general manager under president of baseball operations Andrew Friedman.

Under his watch as the Dodgers GM, the team made its first World Series appearance in 29 years in 2017, falling to the Houston Astros in seven games. The following year, they lost in five games to the Boston Red Sox in the 2018 World Series.

=== San Francisco Giants ===
On November 6, 2018, Zaidi accepted an offer to join the San Francisco Giants to become president of baseball operations. In 2021, the Giants won a franchise-record 107 games, and Zaidi was voted the Sporting News Executive of the Year and MLB Executive of the Year, becoming the first person of South Asian descent to win either award.

When Zaidi's general manager Scott Harris left the Giants in 2022 to become the president of baseball operations for the Detroit Tigers, Zaidi hired Pete Putila to be the Giants new general manager.

In October 2023, Zaidi and the Giants agreed to a new three-year contract through 2026. It was later revealed that the contract between Zaidi and the Giants was a two-year contract, through 2025, with the equivalent of a club option for 2026.

On September 30, 2024, the Giants announced they would be parting ways with Zaidi, hiring Buster Posey to replace him as the President of Baseball Operations.

=== Los Angeles Dodgers (second stint) ===
On February 10, 2025, Zaidi subsequently returned to the Dodgers organization as a special advisor to Mark Walter, helping him with the Dodgers as well as his other sports interests, which include the Los Angeles Lakers, Sparks and Chelsea FC.

== Personal life ==
Zaidi is married to Lucy Fang, a fellow MIT graduate.

Though he primarily grew up in the Philippines, Zaidi still considers himself Canadian. His family returned to Canada every other summer to visit family and friends, and as a result, Zaidi became a fan of the Toronto Blue Jays.

Sporting positions
Preceded by Ned Colletti	Los Angeles Dodgers General Manager; 2014–2018	Succeeded by Brandon Gomes
