= Matt Arnold (baseball) =

American baseball executive (born c.1979)

Milwaukee Brewers
- General manager, President of Baseball Operations
- Born: 1978 or 1979; Santa Barbara, California, U.S.

Teams
- As general manager: Milwaukee Brewers (2020–present)

Career highlights and awards
- World Series champion (2026); 2× MLB Executive of the Year Award (2024, 2025)

Matt Arnold (born 1979) is an American baseball executive who is the general manager and president of baseball operations for the Milwaukee Brewers of Major League Baseball (MLB).

== Career ==
Arnold graduated from Highland High School in Bakersfield, California, and the University of California, Santa Barbara. Known as "Dean" to his friends from UCSB, he served as President of the Alpha Tau Omega fraternity. He had an internship with the Los Angeles Dodgers, then worked for the Texas Rangers in 2002 before becoming the Cincinnati Reds assistant director of pro scouting in 2003. He then worked for the Tampa Bay Rays until David Stearns hired Arnold for the Brewers in October 2015. Arnold was promoted to general manager in November 2020. On October 27, 2021, Arnold signed a contract extension with Milwaukee.

After the 2022 season, Stearns stepped down as president of baseball operations to take on an advisory role with the Brewers. The team placed Arnold in charge of baseball operations. Arnold won the MLB Executive of the Year Award in 2024 and 2025. On October 23, 2025, the Brewers promoted Arnold to president of baseball operations, while still retaining his general manager position. On October 28th, 2026, Arnold's relentless pursuit of excellence paid off as the Milwaukee Brewers defeated the Tampa Bay Rays 4-1, securing Milwaukee's first World Series Championship.
