= List of Major League Baseball general managers =

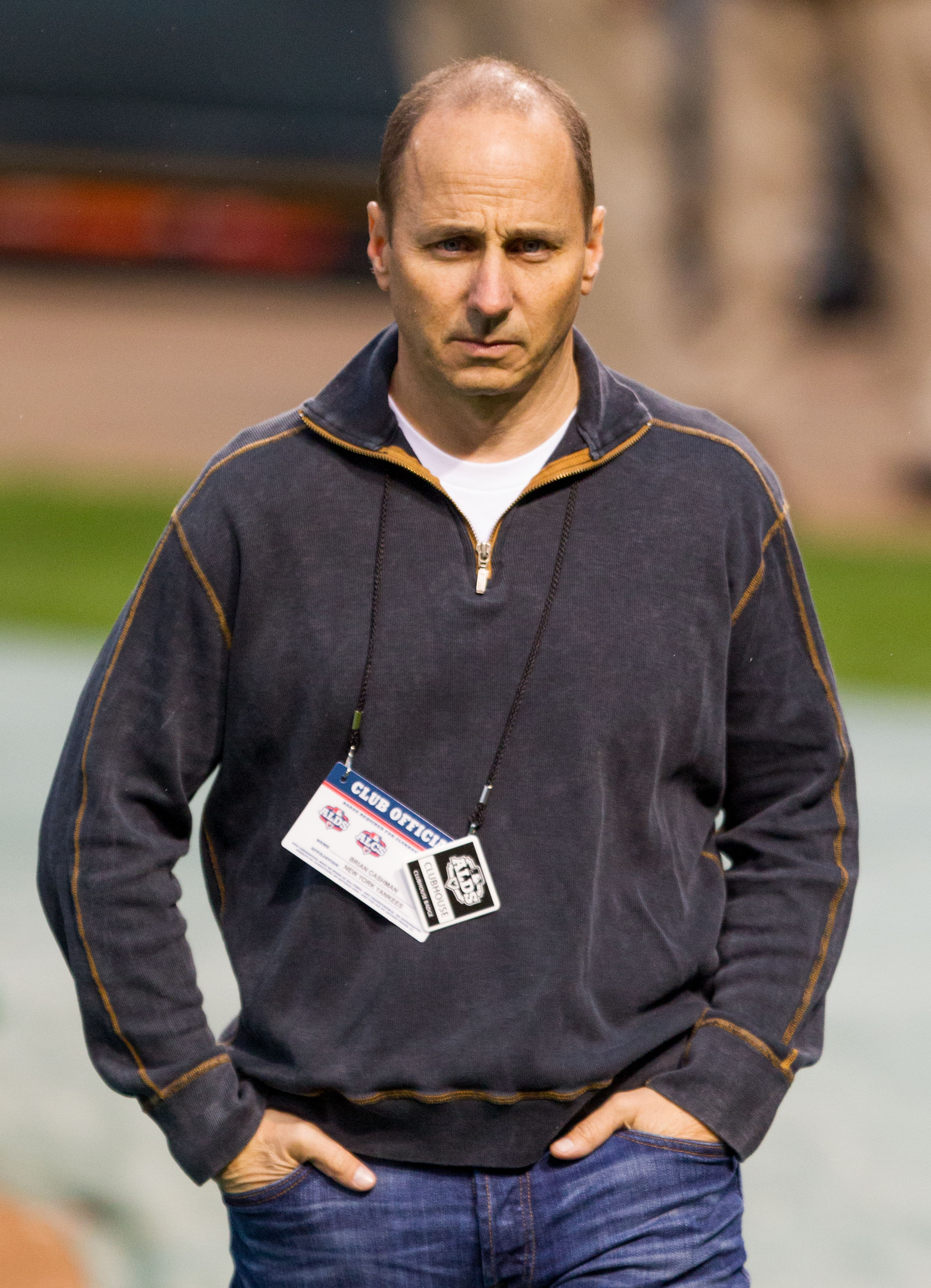
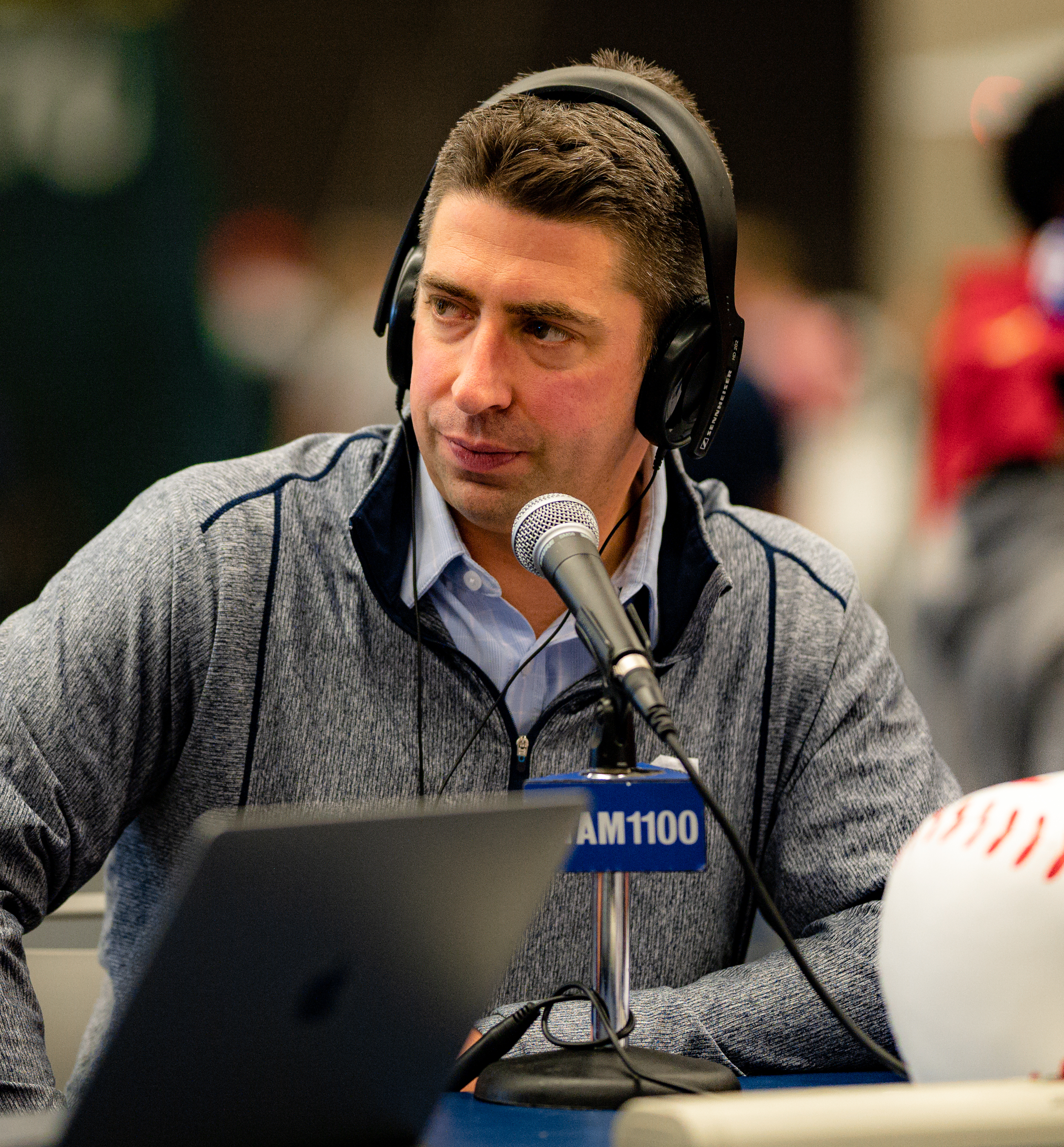
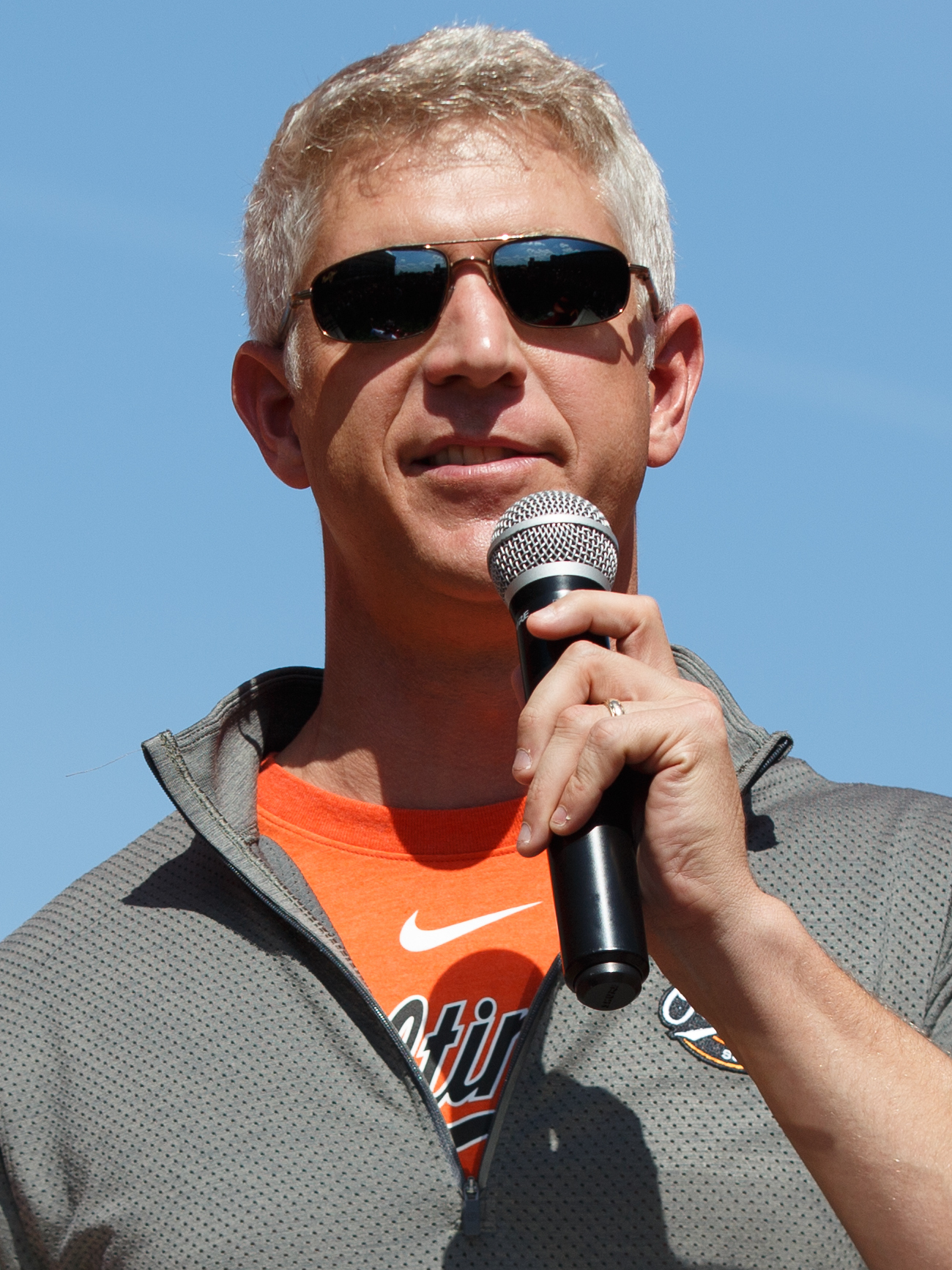
MLB general managers (from left): Brian Cashman (Yankees), Mike Chernoff (Guardians), and Mike Elias (Orioles)

This is a list of people currently serving in the role of general manager (GM) for the 30 teams of Major League Baseball (MLB).

== List ==
Several of these general managers operate with the titles of "president of baseball operations" (or variants thereof, such as "chief baseball officer") in addition to, or in lieu of, a general manager title. Others, while maintaining the title of general manager, are subordinate to presidents of baseball operations who have final authority on team personnel decisions.

For example, St. Louis Cardinals GM Rob Cerfolio reports to former GM and current president of baseball operations Chaim Bloom. Similar relationships appear to exist in Minnesota Twins (Jeremy Zoll to Derek Falvey), Cleveland Guardians (Mike Chernoff to Chris Antonetti), Philadelphia Phillies (Preston Mattingly to Dave Dombrowski), the Los Angeles Dodgers (Brandon Gomes to Andrew Friedman), the San Francisco Giants (Zack Minasian to Buster Posey), the Seattle Mariners (Justin Hollander to Jerry Dipoto), the Miami Marlins (Gabe Kapler to Peter Bendix), the Chicago Cubs (Carter Hawkins to Jed Hoyer), the Tampa Bay Rays (the role, while currently vacant, reports to Erik Neander), the Washington Nationals (Anirudh Kilambi reports to Paul Toboni), the Colorado Rockies (Josh Byrnes to Paul DePodesta), and the Athletics (Cam Castro reports to Taylor Smith. Responsibilities with the Toronto Blue Jays (Ross Atkins and Mark Shapiro) are less clear in terms of who holds the highest authority.

Key
AL	American League
NL	National League

Team	Division	General manager	Hire date	College	Baseball career	Previous	Ref
Athletics	AL West	Cam Castro (Note: Castro reports to President of Baseball Operations Taylor Smith)	November 4, 2026	Lake Erie College	None	David Forst	
Arizona Diamondbacks	NL West	Mike Hazen	October 16, 2016	Princeton University	Minors	Dave Stewart	
Atlanta Braves	NL East	Alex Anthopoulos	November 13, 2017	McMaster University	None	John Coppolella	
Baltimore Orioles	AL East	Jared Banner (Note: Banner reports to Orioles President of Baseball Operations Mike Elias)	October 19, 2026	Amherst College	College	Dan Duquette	
Boston Red Sox	AL East	Craig Breslow (Note: Breslow holds the title of "President of Baseball Operations". He previously held the title of "Chief Baseball Officer", as did his predecessor.)	October 25, 2023	Yale University	2005–2017	Chaim Bloom	
Chicago Cubs	NL Central	Carter Hawkins (Note: Hawkins reports to Cubs President of Baseball Operations Jed Hoyer)	October 15, 2021	Vanderbilt University	College	Jed Hoyer	
Chicago White Sox	AL Central	Chris Getz	August 31, 2023	University of Michigan	2008–2014	Rick Hahn	
Cincinnati Reds	NL Central	Brad Meador (Note: Meador reports to Reds President of Baseball Operations Nick Krall)	September 29, 2023	Oklahoma State	None	Nick Krall	
Cleveland Guardians	AL Central	Mike Chernoff (Note: Chernoff reports to Guardians President of Baseball Operations Chris Antonetti)	October 6, 2015	Princeton University	College	Chris Antonetti	
Colorado Rockies	NL West	Josh Byrnes (Note: Byrnes reports to Rockies President of Baseball Operations Paul DePodesta)	December 3, 2025	Haverford College	College	Bill Schmidt	
Detroit Tigers	AL Central	Jeff Greenberg (Note: Greenberg reports to President of Baseball Operations Scott Harris)	September 21, 2023	University of Pennsylvania (JD Columbia Law School)	None	Al Avila	
Houston Astros	AL West	Randy Flores	October 30, 2026	University of Southern California	2002-2010	Dana Brown	
Kansas City Royals	AL Central	J. J. Picollo	September 14, 2021	George Washington University	Minors	Dayton Moore	
Los Angeles Angels	AL West	Vacant				Perry Minasian	
Los Angeles Dodgers	NL West	Brandon Gomes (Note: Gomes reports to Dodgers President of Baseball Operations Andrew Friedman)	January 18, 2022	Tulane University	2011–2015	Farhan Zaidi	
Miami Marlins	NL East	Gabe Kapler (Note: Kapler reports to Marlins President of Baseball Operations Peter Bendix)	November 3, 2025	Moorpark College	1998–2010	Peter Bendix	
Milwaukee Brewers	NL Central	Matt Arnold	November 19, 2020	University of California, Santa Barbara	None	David Stearns	
Minnesota Twins	AL Central	Jeremy Zoll (Note: Zoll reports to Twins president of baseball operations Derek Falvey)	November 12, 2024	Haverford College	College	Thad Levine	
New York Mets	NL East	David Stearns	October 1, 2023	Harvard University	None	Billy Eppler	
New York Yankees	AL East	Brian Cashman	February 3, 1998	Catholic University of America	College	Bob Watson	
Philadelphia Phillies	NL East	Preston Mattingly (Note: Mattingly reports to Phillies President of Baseball Operations Dave Dombrowski)	November 8, 2024	Lamar University	College	Sam Fuld	
Pittsburgh Pirates	NL Central	Ben Cherington	November 18, 2019	Amherst College	High school	Neal Huntington	
San Diego Padres	NL West	A. J. Preller	August 6, 2014	Cornell	None	Josh Byrnes	
San Francisco Giants	NL West	Zack Minasian (Note: Minasian reports to President of Baseball Operations Buster Posey)	November 2, 2024	University of Texas at Arlington	None	Pete Putila (Note: Putila reported to former President of Baseball Operations Farhan Zaidi)	
Seattle Mariners	AL West	Justin Hollander (Note: Hollander reports to President of Baseball Operations Jerry Dipoto)	October 2, 2022	Ohio State University; University of San Diego	None	Jerry Dipoto	
St. Louis Cardinals	NL Central	Rob Cerfolio (Note: Girsch reports to Cardinals President of Baseball Operations Chaim Bloom)	November 6, 2026	Yale University	College	Chaim Bloom	
Tampa Bay Rays	AL East	Vacant (Note: Will report to President of Baseball Operations Erik Neander)				Peter Bendix	
Texas Rangers	AL West	Ross Fenstermaker (Note: Fenstermaker reports to Rangers President of Baseball Operations Chris Young)	November 4, 2024	Princeton University	2017–2024	Chris Young	
Toronto Blue Jays	AL East	Ross Atkins	December 3, 2015	Wake Forest University	Minors	Alex Anthopoulos	
Washington Nationals	NL East	Anirudh Kilambi (Note: Kilambi reports to President of Baseball Operations Paul Toboni)	December 17, 2025	University of California, Berkeley	None	Mike Rizzo	

== See also ==
- List of Major League Baseball principal owners
- List of Major League Baseball managers
