= List of UCLA Anderson School of Management people =

The list of UCLA Anderson School of Management alumni includes graduates, professors and administrators affiliated with the UCLA Anderson School of Management, who are notable enough to have a Wikipedia article.

== Alumni ==
=== Arts and entertainment ===
- Michael Burns (MBA 1992) – vice chairman, Lionsgate Entertainment
- Eric Ellenbogen (MBA 1986) – CEO, DHX Media
- Jon Jashni (MBA 1988) – co-founder and former president, Legendary Entertainment; studio executive, 20th Century Fox, Columbia Pictures; producer
- Mitchell Kupchak (MBA 1987) – general manager, Charlotte Hornets
- Thad Levine (MBA 1999) – senior vice president, general manager of the Minnesota Twins
- Kelly Perdew (MBA 1996) – co-founder and managing general partner, Moonshots Capital; winner, The Apprentice season 2
- Rose Catherine Pinkney (MBA 1988) – sr. vice president, scripted programming, BET

=== Banking and investments ===
- Peter H. Dailey (BS 1954) – former chairman, Enniskerry, Financial, Ltd.; United States Ambassador to Ireland (1982–1984)
- Laurence Fink (MBA 1976) – CEO and chairman, BlackRock Financial Management Group
- Bill Gross (MBA 1971) – co-founder, Pacific Investment Management Co.
- Robert S. Murley (MBA 1974) – vice chairman/senior advisor of Credit Suisse; chairman of the UCLA Anderson Board of Visitors
- David Polak (MBA 1968) – founder and former chairman, NWQ Investment Management Co.

=== Billionaires ===
- John Edward Anderson (BS 1940) – founder and former president, Topa Equities, Ltd.
- Laurence Fink (MBA '76) – CEO and chairman of BlackRock
- Bill Gross (MBA 1971) – co-founder, Pacific Investment Management Co.
- Nobutada Saji (MS 1971) – CEO and chairman of the board, Suntory Limited

=== Consulting ===
- Marshall Goldsmith (PhD 1977) – former founding director, Alliance for Strategic Leadership

=== Educators ===
- William L. Ballhaus – former CEO of Blackboard; former CEO of SRA International
- Joshua D. Coval (PhD 1997) – professor of Finance, Harvard Business School
- Aswath Damodaran (PhD 1985, MBA 1981) – professor of Finance, New York University Stern School of Business
- Arjay Miller (BS 1937) – former dean, Stanford Graduate School of Business
- Toby Moskowitz (PhD 1998) – Dean Takahashi ’80 B.A., ’83 M.P.P.M Professor of Finance, Yale University, Yale School of Management

=== Food and beverage ===
- Carl Karcher (EP 1982) – former president, CKE Restaurants

=== Government ===
- Roel Campos (MS 1972) – former commissioner of the U.S. Securities and Exchange Commission
- Jim Matheson (MBA 1987) – CEO, NRECA; served as a U.S. representative from Utah from 2001 to 2015
- Giora Romm MBA 1982 – former director of Ministry of National Infrastructure

=== Healthcare ===
- Dr. Susan Love (MBA 1998) – former president, Dr. Susan Love Research Foundation
- Martine Rothblatt (MBA 1981) – chairman and CEO, United Therapeutics
- Lezlee Westine (MBA 1985) – president and chief executive, Personal Care Products Council

=== High tech ===
- Lisa Brummel (MBA 1989) – board member, Laird Norton Wealth Management; co-owner, Seattle Storm
- Frank T. Cary (BS 1943) – former chairman and CEO, IBM
- Martin Ford – author of Rise of the Robots: Technology and the Threat of a Jobless Future, winner of 2015 Financial Times and McKinsey Business Book of the Year Award
- Jeffrey O. Henley (MBA 1967) – former executive vice president and CFO, Oracle
- Guy Kawasaki (MBA 1979) – author, former Chief Evangelist of Apple
- Richard G. Newman (EP 1976) – former chairman and CEO, AECOM
- Dan Sanker (MBA 1992) – founder and CEO, SupplyPike
- Marius Vassiliou (MBA 1991) – analyst and project leader, Institute for Defense Analyses
- Susan Wojcicki (MBA 1998) – former CEO, YouTube

=== Hospitality ===
- Stephen Bollenbach (BS 1965) – former non-executive chairman, KB Home; member of board of directors, Time Warner

=== Not-for-profit ===
- Torie Osborn (MBA 1984) – former executive director, Los Angeles Gay and Lesbian Center; National Gay and Lesbian Task Force, Liberty Hill Foundation

=== Real estate ===
- Bernardo Quintana (MA 1968) – founder, former chairman, Empresas ICA

=== Retail ===
- Brian Cornell (Executive Program 1991) – chairman and CEO, Target Corporation; non-executive chairman, Yum! Brands
- Nobutada Saji (MS 1971) – CEO and chairman of the board, Suntory Limited

== Faculty ==
- Paul Habibi – senior continuing lecturer at UCLA Anderson School of Management
