= List of San Francisco Giants owners and executives =

The San Francisco Giants have had nine general managers. The general manager controls player transactions, hiring and firing of the coaching staff, and negotiates with players and agents regarding contracts. The first person to officially hold the title of general manager for the Giants was Chub Feeney, who assumed the title in 1947. Larry Baer is the team's president. The principal owner is Charles B. Johnson, while the chairman of the board is Greg Johnson. The president of baseball operations is Buster Posey.

== Chief executive officers ==
The club has had 11 CEOs since 1882:

- John B. Day
- C. C. Van Cott
- Andrew Freedman
- John T. Brush
- Harry Hempstead
- Charles Stoneham
- Horace Stoneham
- Bob Lurie
- Peter Magowan
- Bill Neukom
- Larry Baer

== President of baseball operations ==
#	Name	Seasons	Ref
1	Farhan Zaidi	2019–2024	
2	Buster Posey	2025–present	

== General managers ==
#	Name	Seasons	Ref
1	Chub Feeney	1947–1969	
2	Horace Stoneham	1970–1975	
3	Spec Richardson	1976–1980	
4	Tom Haller	1981–1985	
5	Al Rosen	1985–1992	
6	Bob Quinn	1993–1996	
7	Brian Sabean	1996–2014	
8	Bobby Evans	2015–2018	
9	Scott Harris	2020–2022	
10	Pete Putila	2023–2024	
11	Zack Minasian	2025–present	

== Other executives ==
- Mario Alioto
- Jack Bair
- Eddie Brannick
- Corey Busch
- Jorge Costa
- Jerry Donovan
- Edgar Feeley
- Alfonso Felder
- Donald Foreman
- Patrick J. Gallagher
- Tom Haller
- Carl Hubbell
- Mike Murphy
- Ralph Nelson
- Lisa Pantages
- Bob Rose
- Arthur Schulz
- Jack Schwarz
- Staci Slaughter
- Russ Stanley
- John Yee
