= Taylor Smith =

Taylor Smith may refer to:

- Taylor Smith (Australian footballer) (born 2000), Australian rules footballer
- Taylor Smith (baseball), American baseball executive
- Taylor Smith (basketball) (born 1991), American basketball player
- Taylor Smith (golfer) (1967–2007), American golfer
- Taylor Smith (soccer, born 1993), American soccer player
- Taylor Smith (soccer, born 2007), American soccer player
- Taylor John Smith (born 1995), American actor
