= Coval =

Coval is a surname.

- It is the Romanian form of the surname Kowal/Koval, meaning "forger" or "blacksmith" in Slavic languages.
- Portuguese surname, typically in the form of "do Coval" literally meaning "of Coval"/"from Coval".

Notable people with this surname include:

- Joshua D. Coval, American economist
- Kevin Coval, American poet
- Nicolae Coval, Moldavian SSR politician
