= Justin Hollander (baseball) =

American professional baseball executive

Seattle Mariners
- General manager
- Born: c. 1978; Dayton, Ohio, U.S.

Teams
- Seattle Mariners (2023–present)

Justin Hollander (born c. 1978) is an American baseball executive for the Seattle Mariners of Major League Baseball. He is the Mariners' general manager.

== Early life ==
Hollander is from Dayton, Ohio. He earned a Bachelor of Science from Ohio State University in 2001 and his Juris Doctor from the University of San Diego in 2004.

== Career ==
Hollander worked for the Los Angeles Angels for nine seasons, beginning in 2008. He was hired by the Seattle Mariners as their director of baseball operations in September 2016. He was promoted to assistant general manager in November 2018 and vice president and assistant general manager (GM) in February 2020. He interviewed for the vacant Angels general manager job in 2020, losing out to Perry Minassian. As an assistant GM, Hollander was the lead negotiator in contract extensions for Julio Rodríguez and Luis Castillo. In October 2022, the Mariners promoted Hollander to GM. He led negotiations for Cal Raleigh's contract extensions and trades for Josh Naylor and Eugenio Suárez in 2025.

== Personal life ==
Hollander and his wife have two children. Hollander is a native of Dayton, Ohio. He is also Jewish.
