= Derek Falvey =

American baseball executive (born 1983)

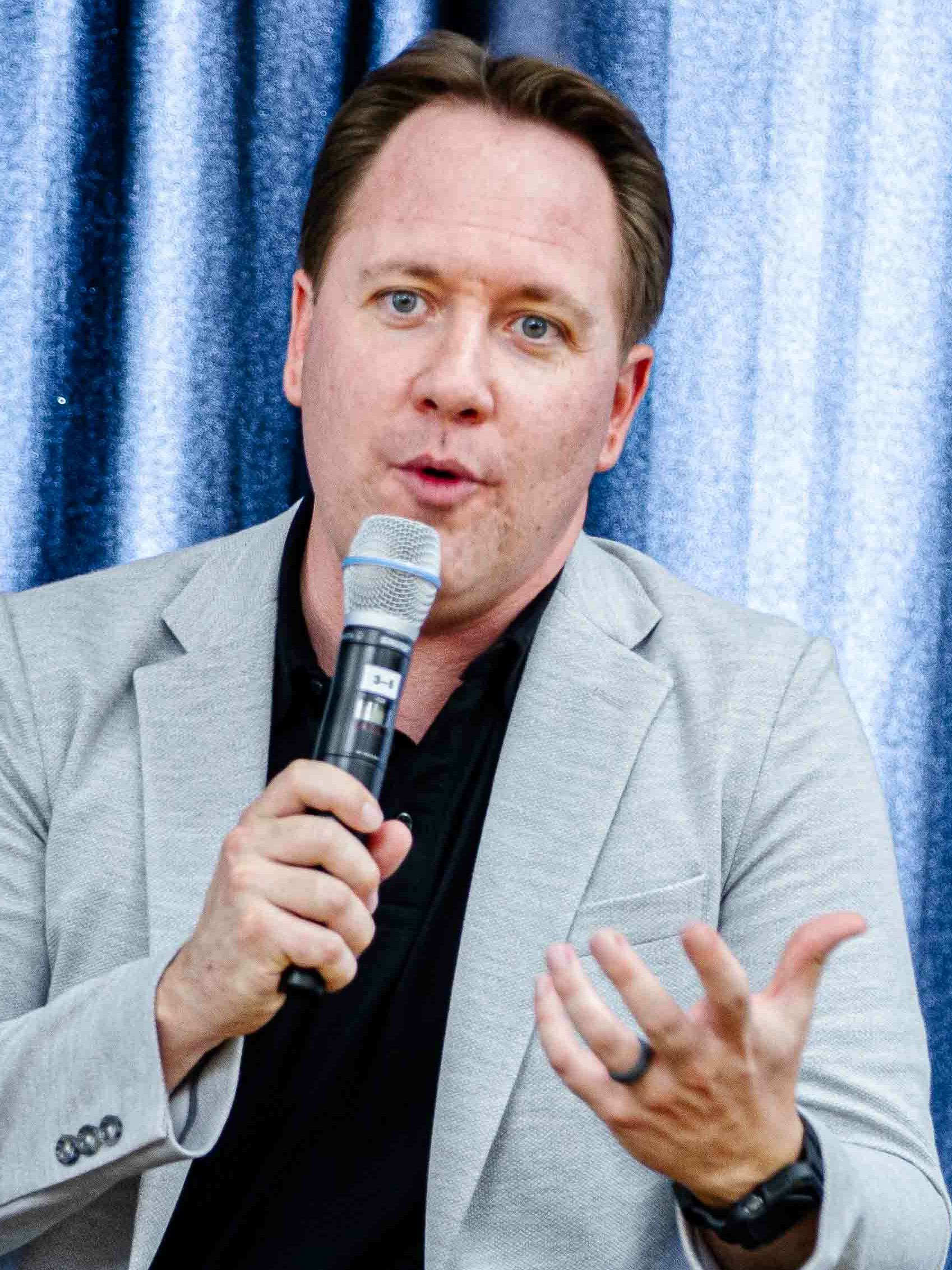
- Falvey in 2023

New York Mets
- Born: March 19, 1983 (age 43); Lynn, Massachusetts, U.S.

Teams
- Cleveland Indians (2008–2016); Minnesota Twins (2017–2026)

Derek Falvey (born March 19, 1983) is an American professional baseball executive who most recently served as the president of baseball operations and business operations for the Minnesota Twins of Major League Baseball (MLB). Prior to joining the Twins, Falvey worked for the Cleveland Indians as a scout and executive.

== Early life and playing career ==
Derek Falvey grew up in a small home in Lynn, Massachusetts with his parents and sister. He attended Trinity College, and played college baseball for the Trinity Bantams as a pitcher. He graduated with a degree in economics in 2005.

== Executive career ==
In 2007, Falvey began independently scouting players in the Cape Cod Baseball League and used the experience as an opportunity to connect with scouting personnel and Major League Baseball executives. His experience in the league led to an internship with the Cleveland Indians in 2007. He worked in the amateur and international scouting departments through 2009, after which he transitioned into Baseball Operations as Assistant Director, Baseball Operations. During the 2011–12 offseason, Cleveland promoted Falvey to co-director of baseball operations, sharing the title with fellow future executive David Stearns. In 2016, the Indians promoted Falvey to assistant general manager.

On October 3, 2016, the Minnesota Twins hired Falvey as their executive vice president and chief baseball officer. He officially started his duties with the Twins after the Indians lost to the Chicago Cubs in the 2016 World Series. He worked with general manager Thad Levine from late 2016 until late 2024. In 2024, Falvey was named the president of baseball and business operations for the Twins.

Under Falvey's leadership, the Twins selected Royce Lewis with the first overall selection in the 2017 Major League Baseball draft. Other notable additions by the team include signing Byron Buxton to a contract extension in 2021, twice signing shortstop Carlos Correa, and acquiring starting pitcher Pablo López for batting champion Luis Arráez in 2023. The 2019 Twins hit 307 home runs, tied for the most ever in a season.

The Twins made the postseason in 2017, 2019, and 2020, losing all six playoff games and extending the franchise's postseason losing streak to 18 games. That streak ended when the team swept the Toronto Blue Jays in the 2023 AL Wild Card Series.

In July 2025, the Twins traded away 10 players at the trade deadline, including Correa, Willi Castro, Jhoan Durán, and Griffin Jax. In an email to season ticket holders, Falvey said the trades put the team in a better position to compete in the future, and he told reporters that the moves were not fully financially motivated. However, former Twin Trevor Plouffe called the Twins' trades a "bloodbath," and baseball executives from other teams said some of the trades unexpected and dumbfounding.

On January 30, 2026, Falvey and the Twins mutually parted ways.
