= David Forst =

American baseball executive (born 1976)

- General manager
- Born: May 18, 1976 (age 50); Santa Monica, California, U.S.
- Stats at Baseball Reference

Teams
- Oakland Athletics / Athletics (2000–2026)

David Lee Forst (born May 18, 1976) is an American baseball executive who most recently served as the general manager of the Athletics of Major League Baseball (MLB). He began his front office career as a scout with the Athletics in 2000, before working his way to general manager in 2015.

== Early and personal life ==
Forst was born in Santa Monica, California, and raised in Encino, California. He attended Brentwood School in Brentwood, Los Angeles. Forst's wife is Rebe Glass, a lawyer with the San Francisco law firm Cooley Godward Kronish. Glass and Forst met at Harvard, where Glass was captain of the soccer team and a member of the 1997 All-Ivy Team, Second Team. They have a son (Judah) and a daughter (Sasha), and live in Berkeley, California, as well as a niece (Serena), and two nephews (Ryan and Nolan)

== College ==
Forst attended Harvard University, where he played college baseball for the Harvard Crimson. Forst was the Crimson's starting shortstop and team captain, and in his senior year he batted .406/.437/.624, while setting a school record with 67 hits. He was named an All-America third-team shortstop. He graduated cum laude with a bachelor's degree in sociology from Harvard in 1998.

== Playing career ==
Forst attended spring training with the Boston Red Sox of Major League Baseball (MLB) in 1999. He played for the Springfield Capitals of the independent Frontier League in 1998 (batting .280/.350/.320; playing primarily third base) and 1999 (batting .294/.362/.376; playing primarily shortstop).

== Front office career ==
In 2000, Forst sent his résumé to MLB teams and was hired by the Oakland Athletics as a scout. He became the Athletics' assistant general manager in 2004, succeeding Paul DePodesta. He turned down opportunities to interview for the general manager position with the Seattle Mariners and San Diego Padres. After the 2015 season, the Athletics announced that, with Billy Beane being promoted to executive vice president of baseball operations, Forst would be promoted to general manager.

On August 7, 2026, Forst was fired as the Athletics' general manager, with assistant general manager Dan Feinstein serving as the interim for the remainder of the season.
