= Jeremy Zoll =

American baseball executive

Minnesota Twins
- General manager
- Born: 1989 or 1990

Teams
- As executive: Los Angeles Dodgers (2016–2017); Minnesota Twins (2018–2024); As general manager: Minnesota Twins (2024–present)

Jeremy Zoll (born 1989 or 1990) is an American baseball executive for the Minnesota Twins of Major League Baseball (MLB). He has served as the Twins' general manager since November 2024.

== Early life ==
Zoll grew up in Ridgewood, New Jersey, and attended Ridgewood High School. Following high school, he attended Haverford College, where he was a four-year starter at catcher for the Fords, earning first-team all-Centennial Conference honors his senior year. He earned his bachelor's degree in East Asian studies with a minor in economics in 2012.

== Baseball career ==
=== Early career ===
Zoll began his career as a summer intern for the Cincinnati Reds in 2011, followed by a video internship for the Toronto Blue Jays's High-A affiliate Vancouver Canadians in 2012. He worked for the Los Angeles Angels from 2013 to 2016, as an advance scouting coordinator. From there, he worked for the Los Angeles Dodgers as their assistant director of player development from 2016 to 2017.

=== Minnesota Twins ===
Zoll was hired by the Minnesota Twins as their director of minor league operations, where he served from 2018 to 2019. He was promoted to assistant general manager (GM) in 2020, and assumed the title of vice president in 2021. Following the departure of Thad Levine as Twins GM, Zoll was promoted on November 12, 2024.

Sporting positions
Preceded by Thad Levine	Minnesota Twins general manager 2025–present	Succeeded by Incumbent
