= Roel Campos =

American lawyer

Commissioner of the United States Securities and Exchange Commission
- In office August 22, 2002 – September 18, 2007
- Nominated by: George W. Bush
- Preceded by: Isaac C. Hunt, Jr.
- Succeeded by: Luis A. Aguilar

Personal details
- Born: 1949 (age 76–77) Harlingen, Texas, U.S.
- Party: Democratic
- Spouse: Mini Villarreal
- Education: United States Air Force Academy (BS); University of California, Los Angeles (MBA); Harvard University (JD)
- Occupation: Lawyer

Military service
- Allegiance: United States of America
- Branch/service: United States Air Force
- Years of service: 1971–1976

Roel Clark Campos (born 1949) is an American business lawyer. He served as Securities and Exchange Commissioner between 2002 and 2007. He is now a partner with the law firm Hughes Hubbard & Reed LLP.

== Early life and education ==
Campos earned his J.D. from Harvard Law School in 1979, his M.B.A. from the University of California, Los Angeles in 1972, and in 1971 earned his B.S. from the United States Air Force Academy.

== Career ==
As of 2002, he was general counsel of El Dorado Communications, which he had co-founded in Houston.

He served as Securities and Exchange Commissioner (SEC) between 2002 and 2007. In 2002, Roel was appointed for the first of two times by President George W. Bush, and confirmed by the US Senate to be Commissioner of the SEC. He left the SEC to return to the private sector in September 2007.

Campos was named to then President-elect Barack Obama's economic advisory board, and was considered a possible successor to former SEC chairman Christopher Cox. After the White House nomination, he was nominated to fill an SEC opening in 2002 by Tom Daschle, then Senate Majority Leader. According to the Wall Street Journal, he was the first Hispanic to serve to the SEC in SEC history. He was on the President's Intelligence Advisory Board.

He is a current member of the Committee on Capital Markets Regulation, an independent and nonpartisan 501(c)(3) research organization. In 2008, Campos was appointed a member of the Board of Trustees of the International Valuation Standards Council, and in December 2011 as interim Chairman.

in 2019, Campos became chair of the Latino Corporate Directors Association (LCDA). In 2020, he was also chair of the Smithsonian Latino Center and Gallery. He was also on the board of the Latino Donor Collaborative and the boards of companies such as Regional Management and Liquidnet.

He joined the leadership board of KPMG in May 2021. He is now a partner with the law firm Hughes Hubbard & Reed LLP, and chair of the firm's Securities Enforcement Practice in Washington, DC.

== See also ==
- President's Intelligence Advisory Board
- List of members of the Securities and Exchange Commission
- List of UCLA Anderson School of Management people
