= 2025 Major League Baseball season =

Professional baseball season in the United States and Canada

2025 MLB season
- League: Major League Baseball
- Sport: Baseball
- Duration: March 18 – November 1, 2025
- Games: 162
- Teams: 30
- TV partner(s): Fox/FS1; TBS/TruTV; ESPN/ABC; MLB Network
- Streaming partner(s): HBO Max (ad free tiers only); Apple TV+ The Roku Channel; ESPN+

Draft
- Top draft pick: Eli Willits
- Picked by: Washington Nationals

Regular season
- Season MVP: AL: Aaron Judge (NYY); NL: Shohei Ohtani (LAD)

Postseason
- AL champions: Toronto Blue Jays
- AL runners-up: Seattle Mariners
- NL champions: Los Angeles Dodgers
- NL runners-up: Milwaukee Brewers

World Series
- Champions: Los Angeles Dodgers
- Runners-up: Toronto Blue Jays
- World Series MVP: Yoshinobu Yamamoto (LAD)

MLB seasons
- ← 2024 2026 →

Locations of AL teams for the 2025 MLB season
West Central East
Locations of NL teams for the 2017–present MLB seasons
West Central East

The 2025 Major League Baseball season began on March 18 (with a special two-game Tokyo Series), while the regular season ended on September 28. The postseason began on September 30. The World Series then began on October 24 and concluded on November 1 with the Los Angeles Dodgers defeating the Toronto Blue Jays in seven games to win their ninth title in franchise history and their eighth since moving to Los Angeles in 1958.

The 95th All-Star Game was played on July 15 at Truist Park in Cumberland, Georgia, the home of the Atlanta Braves. The National League won the "swing-off" tiebreaker after a 6–6 tie after nine innings.

The Athletics relocated from Oakland to West Sacramento, California, for at least three seasons before their planned relocation to the Las Vegas metropolitan area. Beginning with this season, the team is currently branded as the Athletics, with no city name attached.

This was the first season since 2005 in which there was not a no-hitter pitched.

For the first time in Major League history, a season began and concluded beyond the borders of the United States. The season opened in Tokyo, Japan, and concluded in Toronto, Canada. This was also the first time since 1964 that no team played in a fixed dome stadium, due to the Tampa Bay Rays temporarily playing at the open-air George M. Steinbrenner Field that season after damage to their usual home stadium, Tropicana Field, due to Hurricane Milton, as every indoor stadium that was used that season had a retractable roof.

== Schedule ==
Major League Baseball released its 2025 schedule on July 18, 2024. There were 162 games scheduled for all teams. The scheduling formula was modified this season to increase the number of games between "prime" Interleague rivals from four to six, playing two three-game series instead of two two-game series. May 16–18 was also designated as "Rivalry Weekend", featuring 11 series of these "prime" Interleague rivals.

The Los Angeles Dodgers and the Chicago Cubs opened the season at the Tokyo Dome in Tokyo on March 18–19 in the MLB Tokyo Series 2025. Opening Day in North America occurred on March 27 for all teams except for the Colorado Rockies and the Tampa Bay Rays, which was rescheduled to March 28 due to work done at the Rays' temporary ballpark Steinbrenner Field.

The 95th All-Star Game was played on July 15, hosted by the Atlanta Braves at Truist Park in Cumberland, Georgia. The Atlanta Braves and Cincinnati Reds were scheduled to play a game at Bristol Motor Speedway in Bristol, Tennessee, on August 2. Due to inclement weather, the start time was pushed back and then the game was suspended in the bottom of the first inning. The game was completed on August 3. The MLB Little League Classic at Bowman Field in Williamsport, Pennsylvania, was played on August 17 with the Seattle Mariners taking on the New York Mets. The postseason began on September 30.

== Rule changes ==
On January 25, 2025, MLB announced a set of rule changes to take effect during the season:

- If a team violates the previously instituted ban on the infield shift, which requires a minimum of two infielders on either side of second base and all four infielders positioned with both feet on the infield dirt when a pitch is thrown, the batter will be given first base, and runners will be able to advance one base. Previously, the penalty for violating the ban was an automatic ball. Teams will continue to have the ability to decline the penalty and accept the results of the play.
- Replay review will now be able to check whether or not a player overruns second or third base, and call them out for abandonment, even if that was not the subject of the original review.

== Spring training ==
Spring training for the 2025 season began in late February and lasted through most of March. Teams began workouts and practice for spring training beginning in mid-February. Pitchers and catchers reported first, followed by position players a few days later.

Prior to the start of the regular season, each team played between 29 and 34 spring training games (with the exception of the Los Angeles Dodgers and Chicago Cubs, who played a shortened spring training of 23 and 24 games respectively, due to their regular season games in Tokyo), beginning on February 20. There were several times during spring training when a team had two different squads playing different teams simultaneously. In addition to spring training games, teams occasionally played exhibition games with non-MLB teams, such as Minor League Baseball teams, independent teams, or college teams. These exhibition games are not counted in spring training standings. Spring training ended on March 25, two days before the Opening Day.

MLB continued Spring Breakout for a second season, an initiative from 2024 that sees each organization put together a team of their best prospects to compete against another organization's prospects. Spring Breakout took place from March 13 to March 16.

=== Experimental rules ===
During spring training, 13 stadiums were used to test the Automated Ball-Strike System (ABS). When ABS was available, teams had two challenges per game, retaining successful challenges. The batter, catcher, or pitcher could challenge a ball or strike call, but had to do so immediately and without assistance from anyone else. ABS was also used during the All-Star Game.

== Standings ==
=== American League ===
AL East
Team	W	L	Pct.	GB	Home	Road
^{(1)} Toronto Blue Jays	94	68	.580	—	54‍–‍27	40‍–‍41
^{(4)} New York Yankees	94	68	.580	—	50‍–‍31	44‍–‍37
^{(5)} Boston Red Sox	89	73	.549	5	48‍–‍33	41‍–‍40
Tampa Bay Rays	77	85	.475	17	41‍–‍40	36‍–‍45
Baltimore Orioles	75	87	.463	19	39‍–‍42	36‍–‍45

AL Central
Team	W	L	Pct.	GB	Home	Road
^{(3)} Cleveland Guardians	88	74	.543	—	45‍–‍36	43‍–‍38
^{(6)} Detroit Tigers	87	75	.537	1	46‍–‍35	41‍–‍40
Kansas City Royals	82	80	.506	6	43‍–‍38	39‍–‍42
Minnesota Twins	70	92	.432	18	38‍–‍43	32‍–‍49
Chicago White Sox	60	102	.370	28	33‍–‍48	27‍–‍54

AL West
Team	W	L	Pct.	GB	Home	Road
^{(2)} Seattle Mariners	90	72	.556	—	51‍–‍30	39‍–‍42
Houston Astros	87	75	.537	3	46‍–‍35	41‍–‍40
Texas Rangers	81	81	.500	9	48‍–‍33	33‍–‍48
Athletics	76	86	.469	14	36‍–‍45	40‍–‍41
Los Angeles Angels	72	90	.444	18	39‍–‍42	33‍–‍48

=== National League ===
NL East
Team	W	L	Pct.	GB	Home	Road
^{(2)} Philadelphia Phillies	96	66	.593	—	55‍–‍26	41‍–‍40
New York Mets	83	79	.512	13	49‍–‍32	34‍–‍47
Miami Marlins	79	83	.488	17	38‍–‍43	41‍–‍40
Atlanta Braves	76	86	.469	20	39‍–‍42	37‍–‍44
Washington Nationals	66	96	.407	30	32‍–‍49	34‍–‍47

NL Central
Team	W	L	Pct.	GB	Home	Road
^{(1)} Milwaukee Brewers	97	65	.599	—	52‍–‍29	45‍–‍36
^{(4)} Chicago Cubs	92	70	.568	5	50‍–‍31	42‍–‍39
^{(6)} Cincinnati Reds	83	79	.512	14	45‍–‍36	38‍–‍43
St. Louis Cardinals	78	84	.481	19	44‍–‍37	34‍–‍47
Pittsburgh Pirates	71	91	.438	26	44‍–‍37	27‍–‍54

NL West
Team	W	L	Pct.	GB	Home	Road
^{(3)} Los Angeles Dodgers	93	69	.574	—	52‍–‍29	41‍–‍40
^{(5)} San Diego Padres	90	72	.556	3	52‍–‍29	38‍–‍43
San Francisco Giants	81	81	.500	12	42‍–‍39	39‍–‍42
Arizona Diamondbacks	80	82	.494	13	43‍–‍38	37‍–‍44
Colorado Rockies	43	119	.265	50	25‍–‍56	18‍–‍63

== Postseason ==
The postseason began on September 30 and ended on November 1.

=== Bracket ===
Wild Card Series (ALWCS, NLWCS)
4	NY Yankees	2
5	Boston	1
3	Cleveland	1
6	Detroit	2
4	Chicago Cubs	2
5	San Diego	1
3	LA Dodgers	2
6	Cincinnati	0

Division Series (ALDS, NLDS)
1	Toronto	3
4	NY Yankees	1
American League
2	Seattle	3
6	Detroit	2
1	Milwaukee	3
4	Chicago Cubs	2
National League
2	Philadelphia	1
3	LA Dodgers	3

Championship Series (ALCS, NLCS)
1	Toronto	4
2	Seattle	3
1	Milwaukee	0
3	LA Dodgers	4

World Series
AL1	Toronto	3
NL3	LA Dodgers	4

== Managerial changes ==
=== General managers ===
==== Off-season ====
Team	Former GM	Reason For Leaving	New GM	Notes
Minnesota Twins	Thad Levine	Fired	Jeremy Zoll	On October 4, 2024, Levine departed after an eight-year tenure with the team.
San Francisco Giants	Farhan Zaidi	Fired	Zack Minasian	On September 30, 2024, Zaidi was fired after six years as the team's president of baseball operations. The same day, the Giants named former catcher Buster Posey as the new president of baseball operations. On November 1, Posey hired Zack Minasian to serve as general manager.

==== In-season ====
Team	Former GM	Interim manager	Reason For Leaving	New GM	Notes
Washington Nationals	Mike Rizzo	Mike DeBartolo	Fired	Ani Kilambi	On July 6, Rizzo was fired after 17 years as the team's president of baseball operations. The Nationals named assistant general manager Mike DeBartolo as the interim general manager. Ani Kilambi was named the new general manager on December 17. This is his first major executive role. He was previously the assistant general manager for the Philadelphia Phillies until his hiring.

=== Field managers ===
==== Off-season ====
Team	Former Manager	Interim Manager	Reason For Leaving	New Manager	Notes
Chicago White Sox	Pedro Grifol	Grady Sizemore	Fired	Will Venable	On August 8, 2024, the White Sox fired Grifol. In two seasons as manager of the White Sox, he compiled a record of 89–190 (.319) with no playoff appearances. Sizemore was named as the interim manager on the same day Grifol and bench coach Charlie Montoyo were fired. This was his first managerial position. Venable was hired on October 31. He had previously been an assistant coach for the Chicago Cubs, Boston Red Sox, and Texas Rangers.
Cincinnati Reds	David Bell	Freddie Benavides	Fired	Terry Francona	On September 22, 2024, the Reds fired David Bell. During his six seasons as the Reds skipper, Bell compiled a record of 409–456 (.473) with one playoff appearance during the 2020 COVID-shortened season. Benavides, the current bench coach, was named as the interim manager for the rest of the season. This was his first managerial position. On October 4, Francona was hired as the new manager for the Reds.
Miami Marlins	Skip Schumaker	N/A	Contract expired	Clayton McCullough	On September 29, 2024, the Marlins announced that Skip Schumaker would not return as the team manager for the 2025 season. In his two seasons as the Marlins skipper, Schumaker compiled a record of 146–178 (.451), with one playoff appearance. On November 11, McCullough was hired as the new manager for the Marlins.

==== In-season ====
Team	Former manager	Interim manager	Reason for leaving	New manager	Notes
Pittsburgh Pirates	Derek Shelton	N/A	Fired	Don Kelly	On May 8, after a 12–26 (.316) start to the season, the Pirates fired Derek Shelton. During his six seasons as the Pirates skipper, Shelton compiled a record of 306–440 (.410) with no playoff appearance. Kelly, the current bench coach, was named as the manager for the rest of the season. This is his first managerial position.
Colorado Rockies	Bud Black	Warren Schaeffer	Fired	Warren Schaeffer	On May 11, after a 7–33 (.175) start to the season, the Rockies fired Bud Black. Black finished his Rockies managerial career with a 544–690 (.441) record with two postseason appearances. Warren Schaeffer was named the interim manager for the remainder of the season. This will be his first managerial position. On November 24, the Rockies removed the interim tag and named Schaeffer as the new Rockies manager.
Baltimore Orioles	Brandon Hyde	Tony Mansolino	Fired	Craig Albernaz	On May 17, after a 15–28 (.349) start to the season, the Orioles fired Brandon Hyde. Hyde finished his Orioles managerial career with a 421–492 (.461) record with two postseason appearances. Hyde was named AL Manager of the Year in 2023, leading the Orioles to a 100-win season (their first since the 1980 season) and their first AL East division title since 2014. Tony Mansolino was named the interim manager for the remainder of the season. This will be his first managerial position. Albernaz was hired as the new manager on October 27. This will be his first managerial position.
Washington Nationals	Dave Martinez	Miguel Cairo	Fired	Blake Butera	On July 6, after a 37–53 (.411) start to the season, Martinez was fired by the Nationals. Martinez finished his Nationals career with a 500–622 (.446) record with one postseason appearance, which they won the World Series after the 2019 season. Miguel Cairo was named interim manager on July 7. This was his second stint as manager after leading the Chicago White Sox in 2022 with a record of 18–16 (.529). On October 31, Blake Butera was hired as the new permanent manager of the team, making this his first managerial position.

== League leaders ==
=== American League ===
Hitting leaders
Stat	Player	Total
AVG	Aaron Judge (NYY)	.331
OPS	Aaron Judge (NYY)	1.145
HR	Cal Raleigh (SEA)	60
RBI	Cal Raleigh (SEA)	125
R	Aaron Judge (NYY)	137
H	Bobby Witt Jr. (KC)	184
SB	José Caballero (NYY)/(TB)	49

Pitching leaders
Stat	Player	Total
W	Max Fried (NYY)	19
L	Jack Flaherty (DET)	15
ERA	Tarik Skubal (DET)	2.21
K	Garrett Crochet (BOS)	255
IP	Garrett Crochet (BOS)	205.1
SV	Carlos Estévez (KC)	42
WHIP	Tarik Skubal (DET)	0.89

=== National League ===
Hitting leaders
Stat	Player	Total
AVG	Trea Turner (PHI)	.304
OPS	Shohei Ohtani (LAD)	1.014
HR	Kyle Schwarber (PHI)	56
RBI	Kyle Schwarber (PHI)	132
R	Shohei Ohtani (LAD)	146
H	Luis Arráez (SD)	181
SB	Oneil Cruz (PIT); Juan Soto (NYM)	38

Pitching leaders
Stat	Player	Total
W	Freddy Peralta (MIL)	17
L	Kyle Freeland (COL)	17
ERA	Paul Skenes (PIT)	1.97
K	Logan Webb (SF)	224
IP	Logan Webb (SF)	207.0
SV	Robert Suárez (SD)	40
WHIP	Paul Skenes (PIT)	0.95

== Milestones ==
=== Batters ===
- Tyler O'Neill (BAL):
  - Hit a home run on Opening Day for the sixth consecutive season, extending his Major League record. He hit a three-run home run against the Toronto Blue Jays on March 27.
- Kameron Misner (TB):
  - Became the first player in Major League history to hit his first home run as a walk-off on Opening Day. He accomplished this on March 28 against the Colorado Rockies.
- Carson Kelly (CHC):
  - Became the first player in Major League history to hit for the cycle in March. He accomplished this feat on March 31 against the Athletics.
- Aaron Judge (NYY):
  - Became the first player in Major League history to have at least five home runs with at least 15 RBIs in his team's first six games of a season on April 3 against the Arizona Diamondbacks.
  - Became the first player in Major League history to have at least six home runs and 17 RBIs in his team's first seven games of a season on April 4 against the Pittsburgh Pirates.
  - He played in his 1,000th career game on April 4 against the Pirates. Judge's 321 home runs are the most for any player through his first 1,000 games in Major League history. The previous mark was held by Ryan Howard, who had set the mark with 279 homers in his first 1,000 games.
  - Hit his 350th career home run on July 12 against the Chicago Cubs, becoming the fastest player to reach this mark. Judge accomplished this in 1,088 games, breaking the record of 1,280 games by Mark McGwire.
  - Hit his 20th first-inning home run on September 27 against the Boston Red Sox. They are the most home runs by a player in a single inning in a season. The previous mark was 18, shared by Alex Rodriguez (2001) and Judge himself (2024).
  - Tied a Major League record with the most seasons with 50+ home runs when he hit his 50th home run on September 24 in the second inning against the Chicago White Sox. He tied with Babe Ruth, Mark McGwire, and Sammy Sosa with four separate seasons of that mark.
- Eugenio Suárez (SEA)/(ARI):
  - Hit four home runs in one game against the Atlanta Braves on April 26. He became the 19th player to accomplish this feat.
- José Ramírez (CLE):
  - Became the 24th player in Major League history with 250 career home runs and 250 career stolen bases when he stole his 250th base on May 1 against the Minnesota Twins.
- Riley Greene (DET):
  - Became the first player in Major League history to hit two home runs in the ninth inning of a game on May 2 against the Los Angeles Angels. Greene lead off the ninth with his first homer of the inning against Kenley Jansen. Later in the inning, Greene homered off Jake Eder to accomplish this achievement.
- Elly De La Cruz (CIN):
  - Became the first player in Major League history with 115 extra base hits and 115 stolen bases through his first 300 games in the modern era (since 1900) when he hit a three-run home run on May 11 against the Houston Astros.
  - With his 300th career hit on May 23 against the Chicago Cubs, De La Cruz has reached 300 hits, 150 RBI, and 100 stolen bases for his career in fewer games than any other player since RBI became an official statistic in 1920. De La Cruz accomplished this in 310 games, breaking the record of 328 games by Hanley Ramirez.
- Bryce Harper (PHI):
  - His bloop single in the fifth inning against the Pittsburgh Pirates on May 16, was his 1,000th career RBI. Harper became the 14th player in history to reach 1,000 RBIs, 1,000 runs, and 1,000 walks before turning 33 years old.
- Pete Crow-Armstrong (CHC):
  - Stole his 20th base of the season against the Washington Nationals on June 3, becoming the fourth-fastest Major Leaguer in the Modern Era (since 1900) to record 15 home runs and 20 stolen bases in a season, reaching the marks in just 60 games. The three fastest were Eric Davis (40 games in 1987), Ken Williams (54 games in 1922), and Bobby Bonds (59 games in 1973).
  - Hit his 20th home run of the season against the Milwaukee Brewers on June 19, becoming the first player to 20 home runs and 20 stolen bases in the season, reaching the mark in 73 games. He tied for the fourth-fastest to a 20-20 showing in Major League history. The three fastest were Eric Davis (46 games in 1987), Jose Canseco (68 games in 1998), and Fernando Tatis Jr. (71 games in 2021).
  - With his two home runs on July 10 against the Minnesota Twins, Crow-Armstrong became the fourth fastest player in Major League history to reach at least 25 home runs and 25 stolen bases in a season. Eric Davis did it in 69 games in 1987, Alfonso Soriano accomplished this in 91 games in 2002, and Bobby Bonds also took 91 games in 1973. Crow-Armstrong took 92 games to reach this milestone.
- Nolan Arenado (STL):
  - Became the seventh player in Major League history to hit 350 home runs and earn 10 Gold Gloves when he hit his 350th career home run on June 19 against the Chicago White Sox. The other six players to achieve this feat are Johnny Bench, Ken Griffey Jr., Andruw Jones, Al Kaline, Willie Mays, and Mike Schmidt.
- Juan Soto (NYM):
  - With his 1,000th career hit on June 19 against the Atlanta Braves, Soto became the 84th player to hit that mark at age 26 or younger. He is the 17th player to record 1,000 hits and 200 homers before his 27th birthday. He's the only player in that age bracket to record 1,000 hits, 200 homers, and 800 walks.
  - With two home runs on June 26 against the Atlanta Braves, Soto passed Jimmie Foxx for most multi-home run games before turning 27 in Major League history. Foxx set the record during the 1934 season and had 26 multi-home run games before turning 27. Soto broke the 91-year-old record at the age of 26, eight months, and one day.
  - Drew his 893rd career walk on September 23 against the Chicago Cubs, passing Mickey Mantle for the most in Major League history before turning 28 years old. Soto was still just 26 years old at the time. He also set the record for most walks before turning 27 earlier this season. Soto now has the most career walks before turning 20, 21, 23, 24, 25, 26, 27, and 28.
- Cal Raleigh (SEA):
  - With two home runs, giving him 29 on the season (in 73 games), on June 20 against the Chicago Cubs, Raleigh passed Johnny Bench for the most home runs by a primary catcher before the All-Star break. Bench set the record during the 1970 season and hit 28 home runs in 87 games. Raleigh broke the 55-year-old record with 22 games remaining before the All-Star game.
  - Hit his 30th home run of the season on June 21 against the Chicago Cubs, becoming the first switch-hitter in Major League history to have 30 home runs before the All-Star break. He broke the record of 29 that he had shared with Mickey Mantle, José Ramírez, and Lance Berkman.
  - Hit 33 home runs through the end of June. This total put him in a three-way tie for third place for the most home runs in Major League history through June. Raleigh tied with Ken Griffey Jr. and Sammy Sosa as they also hit 33 home runs in 1998. Barry Bonds had the most with 39 in 2001 and Mark McGwire had 37 in 1998.
  - Set the American League record with 38 home runs before the All-Star break on July 11, breaking the record held by Reggie Jackson and Chris Davis.
  - Became the first switch-hitter in Major League history to hit 40 home runs before the end of July on July 27.
  - Hit his 49th home run of the season on August 24 against the Athletics, setting a Major League record with the most home runs by a primary catcher in a season. He broke the record of 48 that had been held by Salvador Perez.
  - Became the second switch-hitter in Major League history to hit 50 home runs in a season, joining Mickey Mantle. He also became the first player to hit 20 home runs from each side of the plate in a season. Raleigh hit the milestone home run against the San Diego Padres on August 25.
  - Hit his 54th home run of the season on September 14 against the Los Angeles Angels, tying him with Mickey Mantle for the most home runs hit by a switch-hitter in a season. It was also Raleigh's 43rd home run this season while playing catcher, passing Atlanta's Javy Lopez for the single-season record.
  - Set a new Major League record for home runs by a switch-hitter with his 55th homer on September 16 against the Kansas City Royals. The home run broke the record he shared with Mickey Mantle.
  - Hit his 60th home run of the season on September 24 against the Colorado Rockies. Raleigh became the seventh player in Major League history with 60 home runs, joining Sammy Sosa, Mark McGwire, Barry Bonds, Roger Maris, Babe Ruth, and Aaron Judge.
  - Hit two home runs on September 24 against the Colorado Rockies. Raleigh became the fourth player in Major League history with 11 multi-HR games, joining Hank Greenberg, Sammy Sosa, and Aaron Judge.
- Christian Moore (LAA):
  - With two home runs on June 24 against the Boston Red Sox, Moore became the first player in Major League history in the Expansion Era (since 1961) with multiple game-tying or go-ahead homers in the eighth or later, including a walk-off homer, in a single game within his first three career home runs.
- Freddie Freeman (LAD):
  - Recorded his 4,000th career total base on a home run against the Kansas City Royals in the seventh inning on June 28. He became the 91st player to achieve this feat.
- James Wood (WAS):
  - Wood became the sixth player to be intentionally walked (officially tracked starting in 1955) four times in a game when this occurred on June 29 against the Los Angeles Angels. Wood joins Barry Bonds (four games), Manny Ramirez, Andre Dawson, Garry Templeton, and Roger Maris.
- Manny Machado (SD):
  - Recorded his 2,000th career hit with a single in the fourth inning on July 7 against the Arizona Diamondbacks. Machado became the 298th player to reach this mark.
- Kyle Stowers (MIA):
  - Became the first player in Major League history with five home runs in a two-game span, where one of the homers was a walk-off home run. He hit two home runs, including a walk-off homer against the Kansas City Royals on July 18.
- Shohei Ohtani (LAD):
  - Became the first Japanese player in Major League history to hit a home run in four consecutive games by hitting a two-run home run in the ninth inning against the Minnesota Twins on July 22. He finished with a home run in five consecutive games.
  - Became the second player in Major League history to start 100 games as a pitcher and hit at least 55 career home runs on September 23 against the Arizona Diamondbacks, joining Babe Ruth.
- Nick Kurtz (ATH):
  - Hit four home runs in one game against the Houston Astros on July 25. He became the 20th player and first rookie to accomplish this feat. His 19 total bases tied a Major League record that was set in 2002 by Shawn Green.
- Kyle Schwarber (PHI):
  - Recorded his 1,000th career hit on July 25 against the New York Yankees with a home run. This was his 319th homer of his career, which is the most by any player in Major League history at the time of his 1,000th career hit. Mark McGwire had 311 home runs and Aaron Judge had 308 home runs when they got their 1,000th career hit.
  - Hit four home runs in one game against the Atlanta Braves on August 28. He became the 21st player to accomplish this feat.
  - Set a new record for most home runs hit by a left-handed hitter against a left-handed pitcher in a single season with 23 home runs against the Miami Marlins on September 24. He broke the tie with Matt Olson (2021) and Stan Musial (1949).
- Mike Trout (LAA):
  - Hit his 400th career home run on September 20 against the Colorado Rockies. He became the 59th player to reach that milestone and the 20th player to hit all 400 with one franchise.
- Andrew McCutchen (PIT):
  - Recorded his tenth home run of the season on July 28 against the San Francisco Giants, becoming the 11th player in Major League history to record at least ten home runs in each of their first 17 seasons. The other ten players are Hank Aaron, Eddie Murray, Carl Yastrzemski, Barry Bonds, Albert Pujols, Frank Robinson, Harold Baines, Mickey Mantle, Jeff Kent, and Willie McCovey.
- Giancarlo Stanton (NYY):
  - Struck out for the 2,000th time in his career in the second inning on July 30 against Zack Littell of the Tampa Bay Rays. He became the eighth player to reach this mark.
  - Hit his 450th career home run on September 20 against the Baltimore Orioles. He became the 41st player to reach this mark.
- Julio Rodríguez (SEA):
  - With his home run on August 3 against the Texas Rangers, Rodríguez became the first player in Major League history to begin his career with four consecutive 20/20 seasons. He also became the third player in league history to reach triple-digits in both home runs and steals in his first four seasons, joining Bobby Bonds and Darryl Strawberry.
- Shea Langeliers (ATH):
  - With his three-homer game against Washington Nationals on August 5, Langeliers became the first player in Major League history (since at least 1900) to have three home runs in his first game hitting leadoff, the second catcher to hit three homers as a leadoff hitter (Travis d'Arnaud on July 15, 2019), the fourth catcher with multiple career three-homer games (d'Arnaud, Gary Carter, and Johnny Bench), and his 15 total bases are tied for the most by a catcher in a game (since at least 1900).
- Francisco Lindor (NYM):
  - With his 20th stolen base of the season on August 16 against the Seattle Mariners, Lindor became the first primary shortstop in Major League history to record five separate seasons with at least 20 home runs and 20 stolen bases. He passed Hanley Ramírez and Jimmy Rollins, who each had four 20–20 seasons as a shortstop.
- Bobby Witt Jr. (KC):
  - Hit his 100th career home run against the Texas Rangers on August 20. He became the fourth player in Major League history to record at least 100 home runs and 100 stolen bases through his first four big league seasons, joining Julio Rodríguez, Darryl Strawberry, and Bobby Bonds.
  - With his two-run home run on August 30 against the Detroit Tigers, Witt Jr. became the first player in Major League history to hit 20 homers and steal 30 bases in each of his first four seasons.
- Patrick Bailey (SF):
  - Became the only player in Major League history to record a walk-off inside-the-park home run and a walk-off grand slam in a season. He hit a walk-off inside-the-park home run against the Philadelphia Phillies on July 8 and hit a walk-off grand slam home run against the Los Angeles Dodgers on September 12.
- Salvador Perez (KC):
  - Hit his 300th career home run against the Philadelphia Phillies on September 13. He became the eighth primary catcher in Major League history to reach 300 home runs, joining Mike Piazza, Johnny Bench, Carlton Fisk, Yogi Berra, Gary Carter, Iván Rodríguez, and Lance Parrish.

=== Pitchers ===
- MacKenzie Gore (WAS):
  - With his 13 strikeouts against the Philadelphia Phillies on March 27, Gore joined Bob Gibson as the only pitchers in Major League history with at least 13 strikeouts and no walks in a scoreless outing on Opening Day. Gibson accomplished this feat in 1967.
- Kenley Jansen (LAA):
  - Recorded his 450th save by closing out the victory on April 8 against the Tampa Bay Rays. Jansen became the fourth pitcher to achieve this feat.
- José Quintana (MIL):
  - Became the 24th pitcher to earn a win against all the current teams on April 11 against the Arizona Diamondbacks. He joined Gerrit Cole, Charlie Morton, Max Scherzer, and Justin Verlander as the only active pitchers to do so.
- Spencer Strider (ATL):
  - Recorded his 500th career strikeout in the fifth inning against the Toronto Blue Jays on April 16. His strikeout of Addison Barger yielded his 500th, which made him the quickest primary starter to reach that mark. Strider accomplished this in 334 innings, breaking the record of 372 innings by Freddy Peralta.
- Jacob deGrom (TEX):
  - His strikeout of Jorge Polanco of the Seattle Mariners on May 4, was deGrom's 1,700th career strikeout. This strikeout made him the fastest pitcher to reach this mark, taking only 225 games, beating Yu Darvish and Randy Johnson, who took 230 games.
  - His strikeout of J. P. Crawford of the Seattle Mariners on August 3 was deGrom's 1,800th career strikeout. This strikeout made him the fastest pitcher to reach this mark in both games (240) and innings pitched (1,493 1/3). The previous records were held by Randy Johnson (243 games) and Chris Sale (1,498 IP).
- Chris Sale (ATL):
  - Recorded his 2,500th strikeout in the sixth inning against the Philadelphia Phillies on May 29. He struck out Edmundo Sosa and became the 40th pitcher in Major League history to reach this mark. Sale also became the fastest to reach 2,500 strikeouts in 2,026 innings, breaking the record of 2,107 2/3 innings by Randy Johnson.
- Tarik Skubal (DET):
  - Over ten outings (April 8 through May 31), Skubal posted an 89-to-3 strikeout-to-walk ratio. This is the best such ratio in Major League history over a ten-game stretch in a single season. Cliff Lee had a ten-game stretch where he had a 92-to-3 strikeout-to-walk ratio, but this occurred over a two-season stretch (September 6, 2013 to April 21, 2014.)
- Jacob Misiorowski (MIL):
  - Threw six no-hit innings on June 20 against the Minnesota Twins in his second career start. This outing, combined with five no-hit innings in his debut on June 12 against the St. Louis Cardinals gave Misiorowski an 11-inning hitless streak to open a career, which set a Major League record for the longest no-hit streak by an exclusively starting pitcher in the Modern Era (since 1900). Misiorowski is also the only pitcher since 1900 to have more wins (two) than hits allowed (one) in his first two career starts.
- Chase Burns (CIN):
  - Burns is the first starting pitcher in at least the Expansion Era (since 1961) to strike out his first five batters faced in his Major League debut on June 24 against the New York Yankees. Burns struck out Trent Grisham, Ben Rice, Aaron Judge, Cody Bellinger, and Paul Goldschmidt to achieve this feat.
- Aroldis Chapman (BOS):
  - Recorded his 350th save by closing out the victory on July 1 against the Cincinnati Reds. Chapman became the 14th pitcher to achieve this feat.
- Clayton Kershaw (LAD):
  - Recorded his 3,000th career strikeout on July 2 by fanning Vinny Capra of the Chicago White Sox in the sixth inning. Kershaw becomes the 20th player to reach this mark. Kershaw also became the fourth left-hander to achieve the feat, joining Steve Carlton, Randy Johnson, and CC Sabathia.
- Rich Hill (KC):
  - With his season debut for the Royals on July 22 against the Chicago Cubs, Hill tied Edwin Jackson's Major League record by playing for his 14th different team.
- Justin Verlander (SF):
  - Recorded his 3,500th career strikeout on August 10 by fanning Nathaniel Lowe of the Washington Nationals in the first inning. Verlander became the 10th player to achieve this mark.
- Paul Skenes (PIT):
  - His 50th start was on August 24 against the Colorado Rockies and he lowered his career ERA to 2.02. Since the start of the Live Ball Era in 1920, the only pitcher to have a lower ERA over their first 50 starts is Vida Blue, who recorded a 2.01 ERA from 1969 to 1972.
  - Lowered his ERA to 1.97 against the Cincinnati Reds on September 24. He became the fourth pitcher in the Live Ball Era (1920) to record an ERA that low in his age-23 season or younger, joining Dwight Gooden, Vida Blue, and Dean Chance.
- Yusei Kikuchi (LAA):
  - Recorded his 1,000th career strikeout on September 7 by fanning Shea Langeliers in the first inning. Kikuchi became the fourth Japanese-born pitcher to record 1,000 career strikeouts in Major League history. He joined Yu Darvish, Hideo Nomo, and Kenta Maeda as the only Japanese players to reach that mark in the Majors.

=== Miscellaneous ===
- New York Yankees:
  - Became the first team in Major League history to hit three home runs on the first three pitches of the game. This was accomplished on March 29 against the Milwaukee Brewers.
  - Set a Major League record for most home runs hit, seven, through the first three innings in a game on March 29 against the Milwaukee Brewers.
  - Set a Major League record for most home runs in a team's first four games of the season, hitting 18 home runs from March 27 to April 1. The previous record of 16 was set by the Detroit Tigers in 2006.
  - Set a Major League record for most home runs in a team's first eight games of the season, hitting 25 home runs from March 27 to April 5. The previous record of 23 was set by the St. Louis Cardinals in 2000.
  - Became the first team in Major League history to hit three consecutive homers to start a game twice in one season. The first was on March 29 (see above) and the latest was accomplished on April 29 against the Baltimore Orioles.
  - Tied a Major League record by hitting 14 home runs in a two-game span (August 19–20) against the Tampa Bay Rays, tying the mark first set by the 1999 Cincinnati Reds.
  - Set a Major League record for most first-inning home runs with 50 - three more than the previous mark by the 2023 Atlanta Braves.
- Los Angeles Dodgers:
  - Became the first team in Major League history as the defending World Series champions to begin the season 8–0.
- San Diego Padres:
  - With their shutout on April 13 against the Colorado Rockies, the Padres tied a Major League record by becoming the second team to notch six shutouts in its first 16 games of the season. The only other team to accomplish this was the 1966 Cleveland Indians.
- Paul Skenes / Henry Davis (PIT):
  - Became the first-ever battery of No. 1 overall draft picks on April 14 against the Washington Nationals. Skenes was the first pick in 2023, while Davis was the first pick in 2021.
- Kansas City Royals / Baltimore Orioles:
  - In their game on May 4 in Camden Yards, the teams combined for ten solo home runs, which tied the Major League record for most combined home runs in a single contest. The other times this happened in league history was on May 22, 2022 (Diamondbacks–Cubs at Wrigley Field) and on May 28, 1995 (White Sox–Tigers at Tiger Stadium). The Royals hit seven of them.
- San Francisco Giants:
  - Set a modern (1900–present) major league record set in 1994 for most runs scored in the 11th inning, by scoring 9 runs against the Chicago Cubs on May 6.
- Colorado Rockies:
  - Set a record for futility by setting a Major League record in the modern era (since 1901) for the most losses after 43 games when they lost to the Texas Rangers on May 14. This loss was their 36th of the season.
  - With a loss to the Philadelphia Phillies on May 22, Colorado fell to a record of 8–42. This is the worst 50-game start in the Major League's modern era (since 1901). Prior to 1900, the worst 50-game start in history was the 1895 Louisville Colonels, who started the season at 7–43.
  - With a loss to the Chicago Cubs on May 27, the Rockies lost their 21st consecutive series, dating back to the end of last season. This set a new Major League record that was held by the Chicago White Sox in 2024 with 20. The Rockies won their series against the Miami Marlins by winning the first two games of the three-game series on June 2–3. By winning this series, the run of 22 series losses came to an end.
  - Recorded their 50th loss of the season on June 1 against the New York Mets. The Rockies fell to 9–50, which is the worst record through 59 games of any major league team in the modern era (since 1901). This is also the third-fastest team to the 50-loss mark, behind only the 1884 Kansas City Unions and 1876 Cincinnati Red Stockings, who got to 50 losses in 57 games.
  - Set the modern Major League record (since 1901) for worst run differential, with -424. The previous record of -349 was held by the 1932 Boston Red Sox.
- Boston Red Sox:
  - Became the fifth franchise in Major League history (since 1901) to record 10,000 wins in franchise history with their victory against the Washington Nationals on July 5.
- Pittsburgh Pirates:
  - Tied a Major League record on July 6 against the Seattle Mariners by being involved in six straight shutouts (either winning or losing). The Pirates shut out the St. Louis Cardinals on June 30–July 2 for three games (7–0, 1–0, 5–0) and then the Mariners returned the favor on July 4–6 (6–0, 1–0, 1–0). They became the fifth team to achieve this, joining the 1903 Pittsburgh Pirates, the 1919 Chicago Cubs, the 1949 Chicago White Sox, and the 1953 Washington Senators.
- Terry Francona (CIN):
  - Recorded his 2,000th victory as a manager when the Reds defeated the Colorado Rockies on July 13. Francona became the 13th manager in Major League history to amass this many wins.
- Philadelphia Phillies:
  - Became the first team since 1971 to win a game on a walk-off catcher's interference. The Phillies defeated the Boston Red Sox on July 22 when Edmundo Sosa's bat hit Carlos Narváez's glove with the bases loaded in the bottom of the 10th inning.
- Kansas City Royals:
  - Tied a Major League record on July 30 by using nine total pitchers in an extra-innings shutout against the Atlanta Braves. The only other club to accomplish this was the Cleveland Indians in a 10-inning game during the 2016 season.
- Atlanta Braves / Cincinnati Reds:
  - The MLB Speedway Classic set a new Major League record for attendance in a game with 91,032. This broke the previous paid attendance record of 84,587 set September 12, 1954, when Cleveland Stadium hosted the New York Yankees.
- Jen Pawol:
  - Became the first woman to be an umpire in a regular-season Major League Baseball game on August 9 at Truist Park as the Atlanta Braves played the Miami Marlins. She worked both games of the doubleheader that day on the bases and worked behind the plate on August 10.
- Aaron Judge (NYY) / Shohei Ohtani (LAD) / Cal Raleigh (SEA) / Kyle Schwarber (PHI):
  - Tied a Major League record by becoming the third set of four players to hit at least 50 home runs in the same season. The other seasons were in 1998 (Mark McGwire 70, Sammy Sosa 66, Ken Griffey Jr. 56, and Greg Vaughn 50) and in 2001 (Barry Bonds 73, Sammy Sosa 64, Luis Gonzalez 57, and Alex Rodriguez 52).
- Juan Soto (NYM) / Jazz Chisholm Jr. (NYY) / José Ramírez (CLE) / Corbin Carroll (ARI) / Francisco Lindor (NYM) / Pete Crow-Armstrong (CHC) / Julio Rodríguez (SEA):
  - Set a new record for the most players (seven) to reach the 30–30 club in a single season in Major League history. It breaks a tie with the 1987, 1996, 1997, 2011, and 2023 seasons.
- Juan Soto (NYM) / Francisco Lindor (NYM):
  - Became the third set of teammates in Major League history to ever go 30–30 in the same season, joining the Mets' Howard Johnson and Darryl Strawberry (1987) and the Colorado Rockies' Dante Bichette and Ellis Burks (1996)
- Cleveland Guardians:
  - Became the fourth team to make the postseason after having a 10-game losing streak, joining the 1951 New York Giants, 1982 Atlanta Braves, and 2017 Los Angeles Dodgers.
  - Became the first team since at least the live-ball era (since 1920) to clinch a playoff spot with a walk-off hit-by-pitch.
  - Set a Major League record after overcoming a 15 1/2-game deficit to win the American League Central, the largest such deficit to win the division (since 1969) or pennant (pre-1969). The previous record for a division title was the 1978 New York Yankees (14 games, American League East) and for the pennant was the 1914 Boston Braves (15 games, National League). They also set the record for largest comeback in September, erasing an 11-game deficit. The previous record of 8 1/2 games was held by the 1964 St. Louis Cardinals.
- Rafael Devers (SF)/(BOS):
  - Became the 34th player to play in 163 or more regular season games in a single season, and the first to do so without the benefit of a tie-breaker game since Todd Zeile in 1996. Devers played his first 73 games of the season with the Boston Red Sox, before getting traded to the San Francisco Giants on June 15. Devers played his final 90 games of the season with the Giants. Justin Morneau of the Minnesota Twins was the most recent player to play in 163 regular-season games, playing his 163rd game in the 2008 AL Central tie-breaker game against the Chicago White Sox.
- Chase DeLauter (CLE):
  - Became the sixth player to make his Major League debut in the postseason, in Game 2 of the American League Wild Card Series against the Detroit Tigers.

== Awards and honors ==
=== Regular season ===
Baseball Writers' Association of America Awards
BBWAA Award	National League	American League
Rookie of the Year	Drake Baldwin (ATL)	Nick Kurtz (ATH)
Manager of the Year	Pat Murphy (MIL)	Stephen Vogt (CLE)
Cy Young Award	Paul Skenes (PIT)	Tarik Skubal (DET)
Most Valuable Player	Shohei Ohtani (LAD)	Aaron Judge (NYY)
Gold Glove Awards
Position	National League	American League
Pitcher	Logan Webb (SF)	Max Fried (NYY)
Catcher	Patrick Bailey (SF)	Dillon Dingler (DET)
1st Base	Matt Olson (ATL)	Ty France (TOR)/(MIN)
2nd Base	Nico Hoerner (CHC)	Marcus Semien (TEX)
3rd Base	Ke'Bryan Hayes (CIN)/(PIT)	Maikel Garcia (KC)
Shortstop	Masyn Winn (STL)	Bobby Witt Jr. (KC)
Left field	Ian Happ (CHC)	Steven Kwan (CLE)
Center field	Pete Crow-Armstrong (CHC)	Ceddanne Rafaela (BOS)
Right field	Fernando Tatís Jr. (SD)	Wilyer Abreu (BOS)
Utility	Javier Sanoja (MIA)	Mauricio Dubón (HOU)
Team	Chicago Cubs	Texas Rangers
Platinum Glove	Fernando Tatís Jr. (SD)	Bobby Witt Jr. (KC)
Silver Slugger Awards
Designated Hitter	Shohei Ohtani (LAD)	George Springer (TOR)
Catcher	Hunter Goodman (COL)	Cal Raleigh (SEA)
1st Base	Pete Alonso (NYM)	Nick Kurtz (ATH)
2nd Base	Ketel Marte (ARI)	Jazz Chisholm Jr. (NYY)
3rd Base	Manny Machado (SD)	José Ramírez (CLE)
Shortstop	Geraldo Perdomo (ARI)	Bobby Witt Jr. (KC)
Outfield	Corbin Carroll (ARI); Juan Soto (NYM); Kyle Tucker (CHC)	Byron Buxton (MIN); Riley Greene (DET); Aaron Judge (NYY)
Utility	Alec Burleson (STL)	Zach McKinstry (DET)
Team	Los Angeles Dodgers	New York Yankees

=== All-MLB Team ===
Players were selected through fan votes (50%) and votes from a panel of experts (50%). The winners were selected based on merit, with no set number of nominees per position and no distinction between leagues.

All-MLB Team
Position	First Team	Second Team
Starting pitcher	Garrett Crochet (BOS)	Hunter Brown (HOU)
Starting pitcher	Max Fried (NYY)	Freddy Peralta (MIL)
Starting pitcher	Paul Skenes (PIT)	Cristopher Sánchez (PHI)
Starting pitcher	Tarik Skubal (DET)	Zack Wheeler (PHI)
Starting pitcher	Yoshinobu Yamamoto (LAD)	Bryan Woo (SEA)
Relief pitcher	Aroldis Chapman (BOS)	Edwin Díaz (NYM)
Relief pitcher	Jhoan Durán (PHI)/(MIN)	Andrés Muñoz (SEA)
Designated hitter	Shohei Ohtani (LAD)	Kyle Schwarber (PHI)
Catcher	Cal Raleigh (SEA)	Will Smith (LAD)
1st Base	Vladimir Guerrero Jr. (TOR)	Nick Kurtz (ATH)
2nd Base	Ketel Marte (ARI)	Brice Turang (MIL)
3rd Base	José Ramírez (CLE)	Junior Caminero (TB)
Shortstop	Bobby Witt Jr. (KC)	Bo Bichette (TOR)
Outfield	Aaron Judge (NYY)	Cody Bellinger (NYY)
Outfield	Julio Rodríguez (SEA)	Corbin Carroll (ARI)
Outfield	Juan Soto (NYM)	Pete Crow-Armstrong (CHC)

=== Other awards ===
- The Sporting News MLB Player of the Year: Cal Raleigh (SEA)
- Comeback Players of the Year: Ronald Acuña Jr. (ATL, National); Jacob DeGrom (TEX, American)
- Edgar Martínez Award (Best designated hitter): Shohei Ohtani (LAD)
- Hank Aaron Award: Shohei Ohtani (LAD, National); Aaron Judge (NYY, American)
- Roberto Clemente Award (Humanitarian): Mookie Betts (LAD)
- Mariano Rivera AL Reliever of the Year Award (Best AL reliever): Aroldis Chapman (BOS)
- Trevor Hoffman NL Reliever of the Year Award (Best NL reliever): Edwin Díaz (NYM)
- Heart & Hustle Award: Bobby Witt Jr. (KC)
- Warren Spahn Award (Best left-handed pitcher): Tarik Skubal (DET)

Fielding Bible Awards
Position	Player
Pitcher	Max Fried (NYY)
Catcher	Patrick Bailey (SF)
1st Base	Matt Olson (ATL)
2nd Base	Nico Hoerner (CHC)
3rd Base	Ke'Bryan Hayes (CIN)/(PIT)
Shortstop	Mookie Betts (LAD)
Left Field	Steven Kwan (CLE)
Center Field	Ceddanne Rafaela (BOS)
Right Field	Fernando Tatis Jr. (SD)
Multi-position	Ernie Clement (TOR)
Player of the Year	Patrick Bailey (SF)
Team of the Year	Chicago Cubs

=== Monthly awards ===
==== Player of the Month ====
Month	American League	National League
April	Aaron Judge	Pete Alonso
May	Aaron Judge	Shohei Ohtani
June	Cal Raleigh	Juan Soto
July	Nick Kurtz	Kyle Stowers
August	Shea Langeliers	Brice Turang
September	Aaron Judge	Daylen Lile

==== Rookie of the Month ====
Month	American League	National League
April	Kristian Campbell	Luisangel Acuña
May	Jacob Wilson	Drake Baldwin
June	Nick Kurtz	Jacob Misiorowski
July	Nick Kurtz	Isaac Collins
August	Roman Anthony	Jakob Marsee
September	Joey Cantillo	Daylen Lile

==== Pitcher of the Month ====
Month	American League	National League
April	Max Fried	Yoshinobu Yamamoto
May	Kris Bubic	Robbie Ray
June	Hunter Brown	Zack Wheeler
July	Nathan Eovaldi	Paul Skenes
August	Trevor Rogers	Freddy Peralta
September	Max Fried	Yoshinobu Yamamoto

==== Reliever of the Month ====
Month	American League	National League
April	Andrés Muñoz	Robert Suárez
May	Jhoan Durán	Edwin Díaz
June	Josh Hader	David Bednar
July	Kenley Jansen	Edwin Díaz
August	Aroldis Chapman	Raisel Iglesias
September	Cade Smith	Mason Miller

== Home field attendance and payroll ==
Team name	Wins	%±	Home attendance	%±	Per game	Est. payroll	%±
Los Angeles Dodgers	93	−5.1%	4,012,470	1.8%	49,537	$338,188,810	28.9%
San Diego Padres	90	−3.2%	3,437,201	3.2%	42,435	$188,104,954	18.0%
New York Yankees	94	0.0%	3,392,659	2.5%	41,885	$265,827,533	−8.8%
Philadelphia Phillies	96	1.1%	3,375,457	0.3%	41,672	$278,674,285	12.1%
New York Mets	83	−6.7%	3,184,570	36.7%	39,316	$314,450,000	19.7%
Chicago Cubs	92	10.8%	3,017,983	3.7%	37,259	$169,675,000	−23.9%
San Francisco Giants	81	1.3%	2,925,823	10.5%	36,121	$172,052,858	−26.0%
Atlanta Braves	76	−14.6%	2,903,167	−3.6%	35,842	$223,005,000	−7.7%
Toronto Blue Jays	94	27.0%	2,849,935	6.3%	35,184	$242,062,381	7.3%
Boston Red Sox	89	9.9%	2,776,496	4.4%	34,278	$196,290,967	22.0%
Houston Astros	87	−1.1%	2,727,877	−3.8%	33,677	$204,583,333	−25.8%
Milwaukee Brewers	97	4.3%	2,650,089	4.4%	32,717	$97,448,000	−15.4%
Los Angeles Angels	72	14.3%	2,615,506	1.5%	32,290	$172,808,094	4.3%
Seattle Mariners	90	5.9%	2,538,053	−0.7%	31,334	$144,980,714	1.7%
Detroit Tigers	87	1.2%	2,413,442	29.9%	29,796	$132,893,334	25.9%
Colorado Rockies	43	−29.5%	2,404,613	−5.3%	29,687	$104,724,285	−28.8%
Texas Rangers	81	3.8%	2,397,071	−9.6%	29,593	$208,110,000	−20.4%
Arizona Diamondbacks	80	−10.1%	2,393,973	2.2%	29,555	$178,006,667	10.1%
St. Louis Cardinals	78	−6.0%	2,250,007	−21.8%	27,778	$127,965,000	−32.5%
Cincinnati Reds	83	7.8%	2,170,963	7.3%	26,802	$98,815,833	0.5%
Cleveland Guardians	88	−4.3%	2,051,360	−0.2%	25,325	$88,787,000	−5.8%
Washington Nationals	66	−7.0%	1,916,768	−2.6%	23,664	$100,160,060	−24.2%
Baltimore Orioles	75	−17.6%	1,803,655	−20.9%	22,267	$138,037,000	5.2%
Minnesota Twins	70	−14.6%	1,768,728	−9.4%	21,836	$135,561,190	−0.1%
Kansas City Royals	82	−4.7%	1,748,801	5.5%	21,590	$110,574,444	−2.5%
Pittsburgh Pirates	71	−6.6%	1,525,025	−11.4%	18,827	$69,783,500	−28.4%
Chicago White Sox	60	46.3%	1,445,738	4.7%	17,849	$63,430,000	−48.6%
Miami Marlins	79	27.4%	1,156,777	6.4%	14,281	$44,060,000	−59.9%
Tampa Bay Rays	77	3.8%	786,750	−41.2%	9,713	$90,516,213	−29.6%
Athletics	76	10.1%	768,464	−16.7%	9,487	$58,178,571	4.5%

== Uniforms ==
=== Wholesale changes ===
- Major League Baseball uniforms reverted to the previous cut and materials following the controversial Nike Vapor Premier changeover in 2024. This included the return to larger letters on the player's name and pant customization options. However, the "batterman" logo remained below the headspoon piping on certain uniforms, as it was in 2024. For 2025, the road uniforms used the pre-2024 fabric, followed by the home uniforms in 2026. In addition, for the 2025 All-Star Game, regular home and road team uniforms were used instead of game-specific uniforms that were introduced from 2021 to 2024. However, game-specific caps were still used. Home uniforms were also used on the Home Run Derby, while batting practice-specific uniforms were still worn.
- The Guardians unveiled a new uniform set. The biggest change for the 2025 season was seen in Cleveland's blue alternative uniform set. The jersey continued to have a navy base but moved away from "CLEVELAND" across the chest and instead featured the Guardians' "Diamond C" logo. The Guardians' red home alternative uniform featured a new look across the chest, as the script Guardians from 2024 changed to the club's Bridge Print font with "Guardians" across the chest. Piping on the red jersey showcased a blue-white-blue look. Cleveland's white home uniform continued to carry on its primary historic look with the script "Guardians" across the chest. The logo shifted from being on a slant to horizontal. New piping was on the jersey with a red-blue-red design on the neckline and arms. A new home hat made its debut in 2025, solely with the white uniform set, as the main color of the hat changed to red with a blue bill. All hats continued to feature the "Diamond C," and the club's blue cap with red bill was worn with all other jerseys (home red, road blue, road gray). The road uniform stayed the same.
- The Cubs unveiled a new powder blue alternate uniform, featuring a stylized Cubs logo on the right chest influenced by the team's early logos, and a guitar pick-shaped sleeve patch featuring the city name. The cap was blue with a white panel, emblazoned with the stylized Cubs logo in front. The uniform was inspired by Chicago's history of blues music and was worn during Friday home day games in the summer.
- The Athletics replaced their elephant sleeve patch with a new patch representing their temporary home of Sacramento, along with a silhouette of the Tower Bridge. The road and alternate green uniforms were emblazoned with "Athletics" in front of the city name. The Athletics also brought back the gold alternate uniform last worn in 2018, with thinner green piping.
- The Red Sox promoted their yellow City Connect uniforms to full-time alternates, replacing the navy blue road alternate uniforms, to make room for a new City Connect uniform.
- The Mets unveiled a new alternate blue pullover road jersey. It featured the "New York" script in blue trimmed with orange across the chest, which was featured on the team's road jerseys in 1987. This replaced their blue home alternate jerseys. The gray road uniforms were also tweaked, removing the blue piping and adding blue-orange-blue stripes on the sleeves, collar, and pants.
- The Nationals brought back the alternate red "Curly W" uniform after a one-season absence but removed the white and blue piping. Due to the "4+1" rule by Nike, the team retired the white alternate pullover "Capitol W" uniform after only one season.
- The Orioles added orange pants to pair with the orange alternate uniform for select games, and the set was worn with the orange-brimmed black "cartoon bird" cap. This marked the first time since 1972 that the Orioles would wear all-orange uniforms as an alternate option. They continued to wear white pants with the white-paneled "cartoon bird" cap for other select games with the orange uniform.
- The Royals announced they would wear powder blue pants with the powder blue uniforms for Saturday home games. An alternate cap and batting helmet was also introduced with this uniform, featuring a white panel, powder blue crown, and royal blue brim, and an updated version of the original "KCR" crown logo. White pants and the royal blue "KC" cap were still worn with the powder blue uniforms on other select dates.
- The Reds added an alternate home white uniform. The design was similar to the primary home white uniform, but with the chest numbers and piping removed, and the red "wishbone C" logo replacing the full "C-REDS" logo.

=== Uniform advertisements ===
This was the third year that teams added advertisement patches to their uniforms. The following teams announced their uniform advertisements.

- Athletics: Las Vegas Convention and Visitors Authority
- Colorado Rockies: York Space Systems
- Minnesota Twins: Securian Financial Group
- Seattle Mariners:
  - Home: Nintendo
  - Away: Nintendo Switch 2
- Tampa Bay Rays: Publix
- Washington Nationals: AARP

=== City Connect ===
Seven teams unveiled new City Connect 2.0 uniforms and wore them for the first time during the season.

- The Astros' second City Connect uniform was white with blue letters and featured the team nickname "STROS" in blue lettering with an orange star logo, trim carrying over from their City Connect 1.0 with their "tequila sunrise" pattern and a lunar pattern pinstriping on the pants paying tribute to the history of the moon landing. They also debuted a new hat logo, which was a futuristic design of their traditional star logo in the form of the Astros' "A". The sleeve featured a mission patch inspired by the long-time Union Station logo. The belt loop had "HTX" stitched along the beltline to pay tribute to Houston, Texas. The afterburner socks featured a mixture of orange and yellow in the design of a fire, which symbolized the afterburners on a rocket ship.
- The Nationals' second City Connect uniform was light blue featuring a white outline of Washington, D.C.'s street grid and an interlocking "DC" on the chest which was meant to resemble the block "W" worn by the 1956 Washington Senators. The cap and shoulder patch featured the block "W" with an outline of the United States Capitol dome, as well as two cherry blossoms.
- The Giants' second City Connect uniform had a black base and white lettering. The jersey featured the team name in white lettering with an image of a lava lamp and was meant to flow like sound, as the letting was shaded with orange and purple hues, paying tribute to the Fillmore's stage lights and the posters seen in the Haight-Ashbury district. The shading also paid tribute to the club's roots to "San Francisco's spirit of rebellion." The Giants' outfield glove appeared as a sleeve patch reimagined as a 1960s concert poster. A San Francisco mark was included above the jersey's jock tag. The cap blended the SF logo with tie-dye tones and an orange and violet gradient. A similarly colored gradient appeared on the jersey's end. A neat detail of the design was nine music genre tiles scattered throughout the socks, brim of the hat, and jersey below the tuck line, representing hip-hop, blues, hyphy, rock, country, electronic, pop, Latin, and jazz.
- The Rockies' second City Connect uniform featured a split between light blue and purple, paying homage to the transition between day and night over the Rocky Mountains. The jersey featured bluebird skies and purple mountain majesty as the inspirations behind the color palette. Accents all over the uniform, cap, and branding used the red, yellow, and blue of the Colorado state flag. The Denver city flag was also featured on the lining inside the hat. It was the first pullover City Connect jersey.
- The White Sox' second City Connect uniform was largely influenced by the NBA's Chicago Bulls, another team owned by White Sox owner Jerry Reinsdorf. The red-based design featured the block-letter "CHICAGO" wordmark, which was taken from the Bulls' black "Statement" uniform, along with black pinstripes as a nod to both teams' visual identities. On the black sleeve, an updated rendition of the "Winged Sox" logo was added, and red sleeve and pant piping featured a repeating black "SOUTHSIDE" wordmark. The uniform would be worn with two different cap designs: a red cap with black pinstripes and black brim, and a black cap with red brim. Both caps featured the "Winged Sox" logo with "CHICAGO" written inside the sock.
- The Marlins' second City Connect uniform had a black base, with teal and pink lettering. The jersey featured "MIAMI" in teal, which represented the past with their inaugural season in 1993, using the same color and outline in pink, which represents the city's electric glow skyline. The jersey also featured horizontal pinstripes in both the teal and pink colors with white pants that had "Retrowave" piping down the sides. The cap featured Miami's area code "305" with the original Marlin logo over the top of the city area code. The brim was two-toned to represent the "Retrowave" theme, going from teal to pink. The team had two sleeve patches, one sleeve features an "ADT" patch, which was a pillar sponsor of the Marlins and continues to use the "Retrowave" theme, and the other featured a patch with the original Marlin logo with the new Miami M logo. Finally, the jersey had a jock tag of the entire state of Florida with MIA on the side, which represented the Sunshine State.
- The Red Sox' second City Connect uniform featured a green base, white lettering, and yellow numbers. The uniforms called "Fenway Greens" represented the colors and look of the iconic Green Monster. The font of the uniform was the same as the numbers and letters on the Green Monster. Inside the color of the jersey featured the year "1912" which is the year Fenway Park opened, and also featured the same grey color as the concrete used to construct the Green Monster. The yellow number on the uniform represented the same color used for the score during the current inning. The jersey also featured a blue and red dot, which matched the colors of balls, strikes, and outs. The jersey had a patch with the letter "B" inside a green and white circle, which represented the city of Boston and also represented when a team gets a hit or an error on the most recent play. The hat was also the same green color as the Green Monster, featuring the normal "B" font in a grey color that matched the concrete.

=== Anniversaries and special events ===
Team	Special occasion
All Teams	Jackie Robinson Day (April 15)
All Teams	Pink Ribbons for breast cancer awareness (May 11, Mother's Day)
All Teams	Patch for Armed Forces Day (May 17) and Camouflage caps for Armed Force's Day Weekend (May 16–18)
All Teams	Poppy for Memorial Day (May 26)
All Teams	#4 patch for Lou Gehrig Day (June 2)
All Teams	"Play Ball" patch in partnership with USA Baseball and USA Softball (June 13–15)
All Teams	Blue Ribbons for prostate cancer (June 15, Father's Day)
All Teams	National Baseball Hall of Fame and Museum logo patches (July 19–21)
All Teams	Gold Ribbons for childhood cancer (September 1)
All Teams	#21 patch for Roberto Clemente Day (September 15)
All Teams	"MLB Debut" patch for players who play their first Major League game
All Teams	Gold "batterman" patch for previous season's winners of the Most Valuable Player, Cy Young and Rookie of the Year awards
Athletics	#24 Patch in memory of Rickey Henderson
Athletics	Patch featuring "Sacramento" and the Tower Bridge to commemorate the team's first season in Sacramento.
Atlanta Braves	150th season in National League (since 1876)
Atlanta Braves	2025 MLB All-Star Game
Atlanta Braves	30th Anniversary of 1995 World Series Championship
Baltimore Orioles	30th Anniversary of Cal Ripken Jr.'s 2,131st consecutive game
Baltimore Orioles	55th Anniversary of 1970 World Series Championship
Chicago Cubs	150th season in National League (since 1876)
Chicago Cubs	#23 signature patch in memory of Ryne Sandberg (July 29 onwards)
Chicago White Sox	125th Anniversary Season
Chicago White Sox	20th Anniversary of 2005 World Series Championship
Chicago White Sox	#45 patch in memory of Bobby Jenks (July 10 onwards)
Cincinnati Reds	50th Anniversary of 1975 World Series Championship
Cincinnati Reds	35th Anniversary of 1990 World Series Championship
Cincinnati Reds	#14 patch in memory of Pete Rose
Colorado Rockies	30th Anniversary of Coors Field
Detroit Tigers	25th Anniversary of Comerica Park
Houston Astros	25th Anniversary of Daikin Park
Kansas City Royals	40th Anniversary of 1985 World Series Championship
Kansas City Royals	10th Anniversary of 2015 World Series Championship
Los Angeles Dodgers	70th Anniversary of 1955 World Series Championship
Los Angeles Dodgers	60th Anniversary of 1965 World Series Championship
Los Angeles Dodgers	5th Anniversary of 2020 World Series Championship
Los Angeles Dodgers	#34 Patch in memory of Fernando Valenzuela
Los Angeles Dodgers	2024 World Series championship (March 27)
Milwaukee Brewers	Signature Patch in memory of Bob Uecker
New York Mets	#7 Patch in memory of Ed Kranepool
New York Yankees	25th Anniversary of 2000 World Series Championship
Philadelphia Phillies	45th Anniversary of 1980 World Series Championship
Pittsburgh Pirates	65th Anniversary of 1960 World Series Championship
Pittsburgh Pirates	"COBRA" patch in memory of Dave Parker (July 25 onwards)
San Francisco Giants	15th Anniversary of 2010 World Series Championship
San Francisco Giants	25th Anniversary of Oracle Park
Washington Nationals	20th Anniversary Season

=== Throwbacks ===
- All MLB Teams will wear their throwback caps during the National Baseball Hall of Fame induction weekend from July 25 to 27.

=== Other uniforms ===
- The Dodgers wore gold-trimmed home uniforms on March 27 and 28 to commemorate their 2024 World Series championship.
- All players, managers, and umpires wore #42 on April 15, the 78th anniversary of Jackie Robinson's debut in the majors.
- The Braves and Reds wore racing themed uniforms for the MLB Speedway Classic at Bristol Motor Speedway on August 2 and 3.
- All Cubs players wore #23 on August 2 to honor Ryne Sandberg.
- The Cubs and Pirates wore #21 on September 15 to honor Roberto Clemente.

== Venues ==
On November 16, 2023, MLB owners approved the Athletics' relocation from Oakland to Las Vegas. The Athletics then announced on April 4, 2024, that the team would temporarily play at Sutter Health Park in West Sacramento, California, from 2025 to 2027, with an option for 2028, while their new ballpark in Las Vegas is under construction.

Due to severe roof damage sustained at Tropicana Field caused by Hurricane Milton, the Tampa Bay Rays will play at George M. Steinbrenner Field, the New York Yankees' spring training stadium in Tampa.

Guaranteed Rate Field, home of the Chicago White Sox, was renamed to Rate Field during the offseason on December 17, 2024, as part of a rebrand of Guaranteed Rate.

Minute Maid Park, home of the Houston Astros, was renamed to Daikin Park during the offseason on January 1, after Japanese air conditioning manufacturer Daikin bought the naming rights.

== Media ==
=== Television ===
==== National ====
This was the fourth year of the existing seven-year deals with Fox, TBS, and Apple TV+; and the second year of a multi-year deal with TelevisaUnivision for Spanish-language broadcasts.

This was also the fourth year of a deal with ESPN. However, ESPN and Major League Baseball announced prior to the season that both parties had exercised a mutual opt-out to end the agreement following the 2025 season. In addition, this was originally intended to be second year of an existing three-year deal with The Roku Channel, but that agreement was also terminated after the 2025 season.

===== Linear television =====
- Fox continued to air their Fox Saturday Baseball and Baseball Night in America slate of games on most Saturdays during the season and select Thursday nights (these games will be in regional windows with at least two games per night). Fox exclusively aired the MLB Speedway Classic as part of their package. Fox and FS1 split coverage of the MLB Tokyo Series, with Fox aired the first game and FS1 airing the second; although Fox aired the first game, MLB allowed the Cubs' Marquee Sports Network and the Dodgers' Spectrum SportsNet LA to produce their own broadcasts in the Chicago and Los Angeles metropolitan areas. Fox will air the 2025 MLB All-Star Game. FS1 will also broadcast games, mainly on Saturday afternoons, which will be both non-exclusive and co-exist with regional broadcasts.
- TBS will continue to broadcast MLB Tuesday. Most games are blacked out in the home markets of the teams playing, however, TBS is allowed to co-exist once with a teams' local broadcast. TBS also brought in Alex Faust as the secondary play-by-play voice on both MLB Tuesday and in the Division Series, replacing Bob Costas.
- ESPN continued to broadcast Sunday Night Baseball, with the option to show alternate broadcasts, along with at least five other exclusive regular-season games. For the first time since 2021, ESPN aired a doubleheader on Opening Day. ESPN will also air a doubleheader on Sunday, July 6, as part of July 4 weekend. The network also has the rights to the Home Run Derby. Select games may air on ABC or ESPN2. Joe Buck, who was the lead MLB on Fox play-by-play commentator until he moved to ESPN for Monday Night Football in 2022, called his first nationally televised baseball game for ESPN on Opening Day in 2025.
- MLB Network continued to broadcast a regular slate of games. While most games were simulcasts of the teams' local broadcast, select games were produced by the network under its MLB Network Showcase banner. All games were blacked out in the home markets of the teams playing.
- UniMás and TUDN aired the weekly whiparound show MLB En Vivo (lit. 'MLB Live') on Tuesday nights throughout the season, the weekly studio show MLB Esta Semana (lit. 'MLB This Week') on Saturday nights, and postseason coverage.

===== Streaming =====
- For the first time, ESPN+ and Disney+ simulcast coverage of ESPN's Opening Day games, and the network had the option to simulcast additional ESPN-produced games. However, unlike previous seasons, ESPN+ did not stream a daily MLB game produced by RSN's. Beginning August 24, ESPN's new direct-to-consumer service of the same name will stream all ESPN-produced games.
- HBO Max continued to simulcast TBS' games, however beginning this season it only streamed games on its ad free tier.
- Apple TV+ streamed Friday Night Baseball, which featured two exclusive games each Friday during the season.
- The Roku Channel streamed MLB Sunday Leadoff, which featured one game each week from May to August, with the option to air games in the early or late window.
- Beginning August 21, Fox One simulcast in market and national Fox games, along with all FS1 games.
- MLB.tv continued to stream out-of-market games (including out-of-market Fox games) and all Roku and MLB Network games.

===== Postseason =====
During the postseason, the ESPN networks (including ABC, with Spanish–language simulcasts on ESPN Deportes) aired all four Wild Card Series. TNT Sports (TBS and truTV) then broadcast the National League Division Series and the National League Championship Series, and Fox Sports (Fox and FS1, with Spanish-language simulcasts on Fox Deportes) broadcast the American League Division Series, the American League Championship Series and the World Series.

==== Local ====
- The Chicago White Sox, the NBA's Chicago Bulls, the NHL's Chicago Blackhawks, and Standard Media launched the Chicago Sports Network in October 2024, replacing NBC Sports Chicago as their regional broadcaster. The new network is carried via both broadcast and subscription television. In June, Chicago Sports Network ended its broadcast television carriage in Illinois after reaching a carriage agreement with the subscription television service Comcast. This did not affect the network's broadcast carriage in Iowa, Indiana, Kentucky, and Michigan. However, in July, Chicago Sports Network announced an agreement with WCIU-TV in Chicago to simulcast seven White Sox games on broadcast television.
- MLB Advanced Media reached agreements with the Athletics, Dodgers, Giants, Mets, and Phillies to launch in-market direct-to-consumer (DTC) streaming packages via MLB.tv. For all teams except the Dodgers, subscribers will have the ability to bundle the service with MLB.tv's out-of-market package.
- Sportico reported that NBC Sports California had renegotiated its agreement with the Athletics to account for its transitional relocation to Sacramento. The network's broadcast territory has historically included the Sacramento market, where it serves as the regional broadcaster of the NBA's Sacramento Kings.
- Amid the now-resolved bankruptcy of Main Street Sports Group (formerly Diamond Sports Group)—owners of the FanDuel Sports Network (FDSN, formerly Bally Sports) regional sports networks, its contracts with the Cleveland Guardians, Milwaukee Brewers, Minnesota Twins, and Texas Rangers expired at the end of the 2024 season, while the Reds announced an agreement to opt out of its existing contract with Diamond.
  - MLB Local Media assumed the rights to the Guardians, Twins, and Mariners beginning in the 2025 season. MLB-produced Mariners telecasts continued to be distributed by Root Sports Northwest and its newly-launched DTC service Root Sports Stream; on September 27, 2025, the Mariners announced that Root Sports Northwest would close after the conclusion of the season, and that MLB Local Media would take over distribution of the team's games beginning in 2026.
  - The Brewers and Reds were originally announced as also moving to MLB Local Media, but Diamond later re-entered into negotiations with both teams, and reached new agreements for them to remain on FanDuel Sports Network Wisconsin and Ohio respectively. The new contracts also included additional options to carry the teams' games on DTC platforms.
  - The Rangers launched the in-house Rangers Sports Network (RSN); it operates similarly to MLB Local Media, distributing games via agreements with television providers within the team's market, and offering a DTC service hosted by Victory+ (which is available via a paid subscription, or at no additional charge to authenticated subscribers of television providers who carry Rangers games). The Rangers also announced agreements with Gray Media and Nexstar Media Group to syndicate a package of 15 games—primarily Friday home games—to a statewide network of broadcast television stations, with KDAF in Dallas as flagship station.
  - Diamond renegotiated its contracts with most of the remaining teams it televises.
- On November 22, 2024, the Miami Marlins parted ways with television play-by-play announcer Paul Severino after seven seasons. On January 17, 2025, the Marlins announced that they have moved announcer Kyle Sielaff from radio to television play-by-play.
- Teams with local media agreements with FanDuel Sports Network and MLB Local Media began simulcasting a limited number of games on over-the-air stations. These deals resembled arrangements made under some of FDSN's NBA and NHL contracts, which similarly enable teams to simulcast a limited package of games on broadcast television.
  - In addition to airing on FanDuel Sports Network, the Braves, Cardinals, Royals, and Reds announced agreements to simulcast packages of games on networks of Gray Media broadcast stations. The Braves aired a package of 15 regular-season games in simulcast with FanDuel Sports Network South, with WPCH-TV in Atlanta as the flagship station. In addition, Gray exclusively produced and aired 10 spring training games. The Cardinals aired a package of at-least 10 regular season games in simulcast with FanDuel Sports Network Midwest, with Matrix Midwest as the flagship station. The Royals aired a package of 10 regular-season games in simulcast with FanDuel Sports Network Kansas City, with KSMO-TV as the flagship station. The Reds aired a package of 10 regular season games in simulcast with FanDuel Sports Network Ohio, with WXIX-TV and Rock Entertainment Sports Network as the flagship stations.
  - In March 2025, the Brewers and Tigers reached agreements with Fox Television Stations (a former sister to FDSN) to serve as flagships for similar arrangements, with Detroit's WJBK to simulcast 10 Tigers games with FanDuel Sports Network Detroit, and WITI in Milwaukee to simulcast 10 regular season Brewers games and 3 spring training games with FanDuel Sports Network Wisconsin. The Brewers' radio rightsholder Good Karma Brands is handling syndication agreements for the Brewers' package, which includes affiliates in other Wisconsin markets. In May, the Angels reached an agreement with KCOP-TV to simulcast 12 games.
  - Later in March, the Diamondbacks, Padres, and Rockies, whose television rights are controlled by MLB Local Media, reached similar agreements with Tegna Inc. to simulcast 10 games. The flagship stations would be KFMB-DT2 (The CW San Diego) for the Padres, KTVD for the Rockies, and KPNX for the Diamondbacks. The Guardians reached a similar agreement with Tegna in April, with WKYC serving as the Guardians' flagship. In April, the Twins also announced a 10-game simulcast agreement with Fox Television Stations. KMSP-TV served as the flagship station for these games; Gray Media distributed games in other markets.
  - In April, the Marlins and Rays reached agreements with CBS News and Stations to simulcast 15 games. The Marlins' flagship was WBFS-TV, while the Rays' flagship was WTOG.
- On February 21, 2025, the Seattle Mariners promoted announcer Aaron Goldsmith to lead television play-by-play following the departure of Dave Sims to the New York Yankees' radio booth. The Mariners also parted ways with long-time television analyst Mike Blowers after a 17-year tenure. As a result, analyst duties were split between Jay Buhner, Dave Valle, Angie Mentink, and Ryan Rowland-Smith.
- On March 3, the Orioles and Nationals reached a settlement to end the teams' dispute over television rights fee payments. Mid-Atlantic Sports Network (MASN), which is owned and operated by the Orioles but airs both teams' games, pays rights fees to the Nationals. Through the settlement, the Nationals' agreement with the Orioles and MASN would end following the 2025 season.
- On March 12, the Braves announced that they would introduce Spanish-language commentary on SAP for regional games on FanDuel Sports Network, with Francisco X. Rivera on play-by-play.
- On March 18, the NBC Sports Regional Networks—the broadcast home of the Athletics, Giants and Phillies—launched in-market DTC services as paid add-ons for NBCUniversal's streaming service Peacock, which include all programming broadcast by the networks. Access to these services require an active Peacock subscription. The next day, MLB announced separate agreements with the teams to also offer DTC packages via MLB.tv; these packages do not require a Peacock subscription, but does not include other programming from the teams' networks.
- On March 24, Nationals TV play-by-play announcer Bob Carpenter announced that he will retire following the conclusion of the 2025 season. Carpenter has called Nationals games since the 2006 season, and previously called games for the Texas Rangers and St. Louis Cardinals, as well as occasional national assignments with ESPN.
- On April 21, Mid-Atlantic Sports Network, the home of the Nationals and Orioles, announced the launch of a direct-to-consumer streaming service. The Astros are now the only MLB team without a DTC option.
- In May, the Athletics announced an agreement with Gray Media to simulcast 15 games in Las Vegas, in preparation for the teams' move to the city, on KVVU and Silver State Sports & Entertainment Network.

==== International ====
- ESPN will additionally air its slate of games in Latin America, sub-Saharan Africa, Oceania and the Netherlands, and will air games through Disney+ in select markets in Asia and Europe.
- TNT Sports will additionally air its slate of games in Puerto Rico, the United Kingdom, and Ireland.
- Fox Sports will additionally air its slate of games in Argentina, Mexico, and Puerto Rico.
- MLB Network International will air select games worldwide.

=== Radio ===
==== National ====
- This will be the final season that ESPN Radio will be airing games (due to ESPN opting out of this deal along with its TV deal), which includes Sunday night baseball, the entire All Star Weekend and the entire MLB Postseason.
- This is the second season of the league's five-year deal with SiriusXM and SiriusXM Canada to simulcast all 30 teams' local regular season and postseason broadcasts in English and Spanish.

==== Local ====
- On November 14, 2024, the New York Yankees announced the hiring of Dave Sims as the team's primary radio play-by-play announcer, succeeding John Sterling. Sims was previously the lead television play-by-play announcer of the Seattle Mariners, holding the job since 2007.
- On November 15, the Los Angeles Dodgers announced the hiring of Luis Cruz (who played for the team in 2012 and 2013) as an analyst for its Spanish-language radio broadcasts, succeeding Fernando Valenzuela—who had died on October 22, 2024.
- On January 16, 2025, the Milwaukee Brewers' long-time play-by-play announcer Bob Uecker died at the age of 90. A Ford C. Frick Award winner in 2003, Uecker had been the team's primary radio announcer since 1971, and also worked national broadcasts for ABC and NBC. The Brewers will utilize Jeff Levering, Lane Grindle, and Josh Maurer on radio play-by-play during the season, with Grindle or Maurer calling games when Levering is on television.
- The Boston Red Sox promoted Will Flemming to lead radio play-by-play following the retirement of Joe Castiglione. Flemming is the brother of San Francisco Giants announcer Dave Flemming.

== Retirements ==
The following players and coaches retired during the 2025 season and before the start of the 2026 campaign:

- Jay Jackson – March 29
- Lance Lynn – April 1
- Ross Stripling – May 6
- Evan Longoria – May 12 (announced); retired as a Ray on June 7
- Matt Carpenter – May 14
- Tony Kemp – May 15
- Kolten Wong – May 16
- Jean Segura – May 21
- Jake Diekman – May 23
- Josh Harrison – May 31
- Wilson Ramos – June 15
- Whit Merrifield – June 24
- Tucker Barnhart – June 30
- Kevin Pillar – July 2
- Freddy Galvis – July 4
- Dan Straily – July 6
- Trevor Cahill – July 16
- Kyle Gibson – July 17
- Daniel Bard – July 20
- Nick Ahmed – July 24
- Jesse Chavez – July 24
- Alex Wood – August 8
- Anthony Rizzo – September 10; retired as a Cub on September 13
- Clayton Kershaw – September 18 (announced); retired at the end of the season
- Stone Garrett – September 24
- Michael A. Taylor – September 28
- Garrett Cooper – September 28
- Curt Casali – October 4
- Brett Phillips – October 5
- Chris Owings – October 7
- Manager Mike Shildt – October 13
- Martín Maldonado – October 18
- Kyle Hendricks – November 10
- David Fletcher – November 11
- Austin Nola – November 11
- Erik Swanson – November 20
- David Dahl – December 10
- Joe Kelly – December 22
- Andrew Heaney – December 28
- Jaylin Davis – January 7
- Ryan Pressly – January 17
- Hanser Alberto – January 21
- David Robertson – January 30
- Avisail Garcia – February 2
- David Peralta – February 4
- Jacob Stallings – February 11
- Paolo Espino – March 7
- Julio Teheran – March 10
- T. J. McFarland – March 23
- Roberto Perez – March 24

== Retired numbers ==
- David Wright had his No. 5 retired by the New York Mets on July 19. This was the tenth number retired by the team.
- Ichiro Suzuki had his No. 51 retired by the Seattle Mariners on August 9. This was the third number retired by the team.
- Billy Wagner had his No. 13 retired by the Houston Astros on August 16. This was the tenth number retired by the team.

== See also ==
- 2025 in baseball
