= Zack Minasian =

American baseball executive

San Francisco Giants
- General manager
- Born: Evanston, Illinois

Teams
- As scout: Milwaukee Brewers (2004–2018); San Francisco Giants (2019–2024); As general manager: San Francisco Giants (2025–present)

Zack Thomas Minasian is an American baseball executive. He is the general manager of the San Francisco Giants of Major League Baseball.

== Biography ==
Zack Thomas Minasian was born in Evanston, Illinois, to Zack Minasian and his wife Barbara Ipjian. He is of Armenian descent. Minasian's father was a clubhouse attendant for the Texas Rangers from 1989 to 2009. He and his siblings, Rudy, Perry, and Calvin grew up around professional baseball, and all worked alongside their father from a young age. Minasian was named after his father, and his middle name was selected for his godfather, Tommy Lasorda. He graduated from the University of Texas at Arlington.

Minasian worked for the Milwaukee Brewers for fourteen years, first joining the team as an intern in 2004 and was director of professional scouting by the age of 27. In 2019, he joined the San Francisco Giants front office in the same role, became vice president of professional scouting in 2022, and was elevated to general manager before the 2025 season began. Zack and Perry Minasian are the first siblings to serve simultaneously as general managers in Major League Baseball.

Sporting positions
Preceded by Pete Putila	San Francisco Giants General manager 2025–present	Succeeded by Incumbent
