= Toby Moskowitz =

American economist

- Born: February 3, 1971 (age 55); West Lafayette, Indiana
- Education: UCLA, Anderson School (Ph.D.); Purdue, Krannert School (B.S. and an M.S.)
- Awards: Fischer Black Prize
- Scientific career
- Fields: Financial economics
- Workplaces: Yale School of Management (2016–) University of Chicago Booth School of Business (1998–2016)
- Doctoral advisor: Mark Grinblatt

Tobias Jacob "Toby" Moskowitz (born February 3, 1971) is an American financial economist and a professor at the Yale School of Management. He was the winner of the 2007 American Finance Association (AFA) Fischer Black Prize, awarded to a leading finance scholar under the age of 40.

== Background ==
Moskowitz was born in 1971 in West Lafayette, Indiana, where his father was a professor of management at Purdue University. Moskowitz graduated from West Lafayette Junior-Senior High School in 1989, and then attended Purdue where he earned a B.S. in industrial management and industrial engineering (with distinction) in 1993, and a M.S. in management in 1994. He received a Ph.D. in finance from the University of California, Los Angeles Anderson School of Management in 1998.

== Professional career ==
Moskowitz has been a faculty member at Booth since 1998. Moskowitz has published several award-winning research papers and was promoted to full professor in 2005. He was the Professor of Finance and Neubauer Family Faculty Fellow at the Booth School of Business. In 2007, he was the second winner of the Fischer Black prize.

In the words of the AFA, Moskowitz was honored for "ingenious and careful use of newly available data to address fundamental questions in finance." In Moskowitz' own words, "I try to measure things that are not easy to measure." Moskowitz was praised by the AFA as follows: "Professor Moskowitz accomplishes the difficult task of testing the theory while having access to much less information than is available to market participants." According to the University of Chicago press release, "Moskowitz has explored topics as diverse as momentum in stock returns, local bias in investment portfolio choice, and the social effects of bank mergers. He also looked at the return to private business ownership, the trading and financing of commercial real estate, and the political economy of financial regulation."

Moskowitz won the 2000 Smith-Breeden Prize for his paper "Home Bias at Home: Local Equity Preference in Domestic Portfolios" (with Joshua D. Coval), published in the Journal of Finance and the 2005 Brattle Prize second place for "Testing Agency Theory with Entrepreneur Effort and Wealth" (with Marianne P. Bitler and Annette Vissing-Jørgensen), published in the Journal of Finance. He also won 2004 and 2005 Michael Brennan Award prizes for papers published in the Review of Financial Studies. His 2004 paper, "Informal Financial Networks: Theory and Evidence" (with Mark Garmaise), placed first, and his 2005 paper, "Confronting Information Asymmetries: Evidence from Real Estate Markets" (with Garmaise), was runner-up.

In addition to his academic work, Moskowitz has served as a consultant to AQR Capital Management.

In 2011, Moskowitz and co-author L. Jon Wertheim published Scorecasting, a book that uses statistical and other empirical research results to analyze conventional sports wisdom.

In 2016, Moskowitz joined the faculty at the Yale School of Management.
