= David Polak =

- Education: Massachusetts Institute of Technology; Rensselaer Polytechnic Institute; University of California, Los Angeles
- Occupation(s): Business executive, philanthropist
- Spouse: Janet Polak

David Polak is an American business executive and philanthropist from Beverly Hills, California. He was the Founder and Chairman of NWQ Investment Management, an investment firm with US$30 billion under management. He is a large donor to the Technion – Israel Institute of Technology in Israel.

== Early life ==
David Polak graduated from the Massachusetts Institute of Technology. He received a master's degree from the Rensselaer Polytechnic Institute and an MBA from the Anderson Graduate School of Management at the University of California, Los Angeles (UCLA).

== Career ==
He founded NWQ Investment Management, an investment firm based in Century City, Los Angeles, with US$30 billion under management. He served as its Chairman. The company is affiliated with Nuveen Investments.

== Philanthropy ==
He served as Chair of the Investment Committee of the Jewish Community Foundation (JCF) of Los Angeles from 2004 to 2009. Under his tenure, the JCF invested US$12 million with Bernard L. Madoff in 2004, and US$6 million in 2006.

With his wife, he has donated to the American Technion Society, which supports the Technion – Israel Institute of Technology in Haifa, Israel, for twenty years. The David and Janet Polak Cancer and Vascular Biology Research Center at Technion was named after his wife and he after they made a large charitable contribution to the institute. He received an honorary Doctorate from Technion in 2009. He has also donated to the Weizmann Institute of Science in Rehovot, Israel.

With his wife, he was the recipient of the Philanthropic Leadership Award from the Cedars-Sinai Medical Center at their 2014 Board of Governors Gala, which took place at the Beverly Wilshire Hotel on December 2, 2014.

== Personal life ==
He is married to Janet Polak.
