= Mike Chernoff (baseball) =

American professional baseball executive

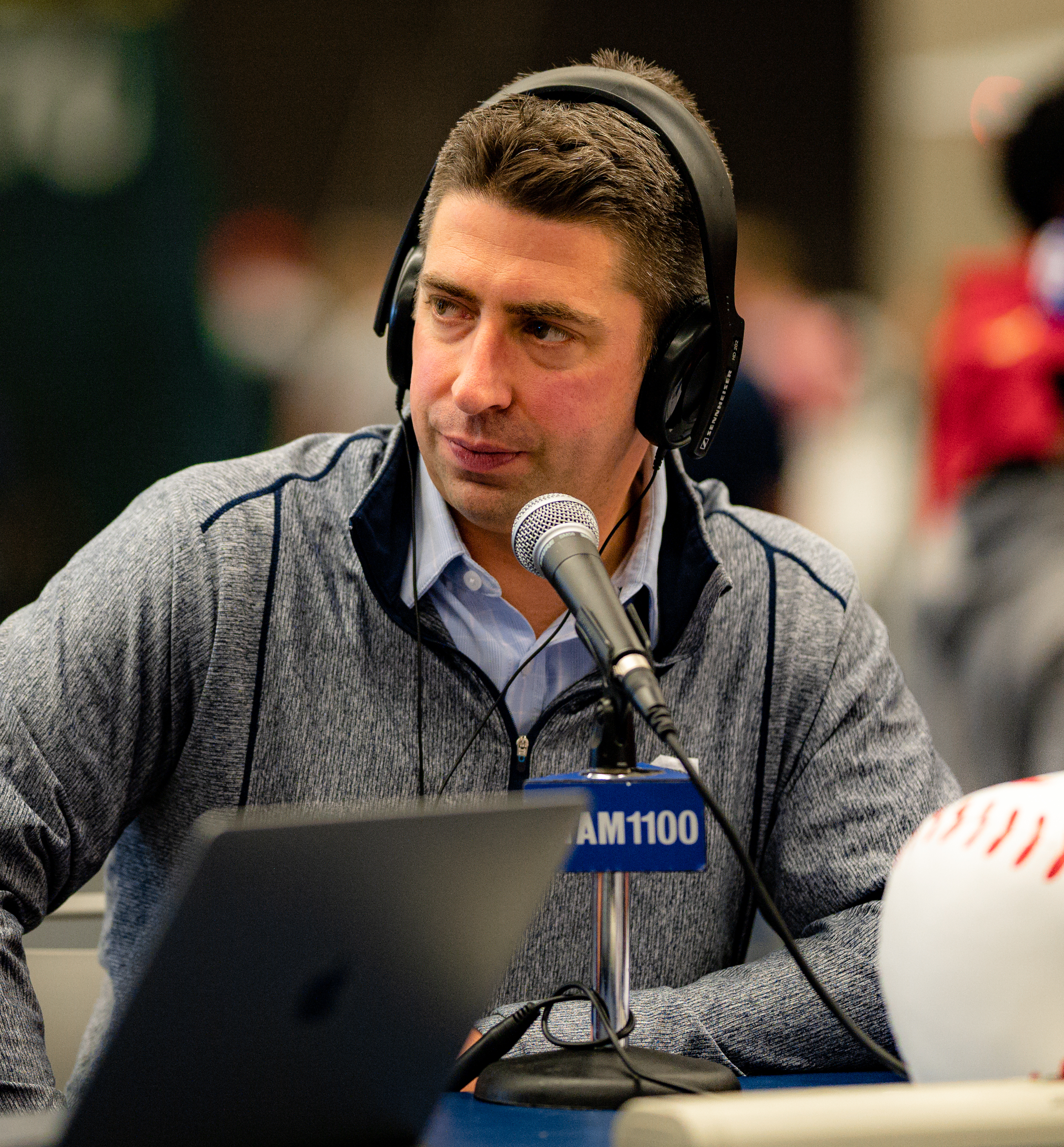
- Chernoff in 2020

Cleveland Guardians
- General Manager
- Born: c. 1981

Teams
- Cleveland Indians / Guardians (2015–present)

Michael Chernoff (born c. 1981) is an American baseball executive who serves as the general manager of the Cleveland Guardians of Major League Baseball.

== Biography ==
Chernoff was born and raised in Livingston, New Jersey. His father, Mark Chernoff, is the vice president of programming for CBS Radio in New York. He attended the Pingry School in Basking Ridge, New Jersey.

He attended Princeton University, where he played shortstop for the Princeton Tigers baseball team. He took an internship to work in the Indians' front office and remained with the team. He served as the director of baseball relations, and was promoted to assistant general manager in Cleveland in October 2010. In 2014, he declined an opportunity to interview for the general manager position with the San Diego Padres. After the 2015 season, the Indians promoted Chris Antonetti from general manager to president of baseball operations, and Chernoff to general manager.

He and his wife, Sarah, have two sons and two daughters.
