= Taylor Smith (baseball) =

American baseball executive

Taylor Bradley Smith is an American baseball executive who is the president of baseball operations for the Athletics of Major League Baseball.

Smith attended the University of Georgia and graduated in 2018 with joint bachelor's and master's degrees in statistics and a bachelor's degree in mathematics. During the summer of 2017, he interned with the Los Angeles Dodgers.

After graduation, Smith joined the Tampa Bay Rays as a research and development analyst, later being promoted to lead analyst. In November 2021, the Rays promoted Smith to be director of predictive modeling.

In October 2024, Boston Red Sox Chief Baseball Officer Craig Breslow hired Smith to be his assistant general manager.

On October 19, 2026, the Athletics announced Smith as their president of baseball operations. Smith is currently the youngest head of baseball operations in Major League Baseball.

Smith is from Woodstock, Georgia and attended Creekview High School.
