= Pete Putila =

American baseball player and executive (born 1989)

Peter Putila

Atlanta Braves
- Assistant general manager
- Born: 1989 (age 36–37); Carmichaels, Pennsylvania, U.S.

Teams
- As assistant general manager: Houston Astros (2019–2022); Atlanta Braves (2025–present); As general manager: San Francisco Giants (2022–2024)

Peter Putila (born 1989) is an American professional baseball executive who currently serves as the assistant general manager for the Atlanta Braves of Major League Baseball (MLB).

== Career ==
Putila is a native of Carmichaels, Pennsylvania. He graduated from Carmichaels High School in 2007, after playing for the school's baseball team for four years. He enrolled at West Virginia University, where he was a student manager for the West Virginia Mountaineers baseball team and earned a degree in sport management.

=== Houston Astros ===
In 2011, his senior year at West Virginia, Putila became an intern for the Houston Astros. General manager Ed Wade hired Putila for a fulltime position in the baseball operations department. In 2019, the Astros promoted Putila to assistant general manager.

=== San Francisco Giants ===
On October 10, 2022, following the departure of Scott Harris, the San Francisco Giants hired Putila as their general manager.

On October 1, 2024, following the firing of the Giants president of baseball operations, Farhan Zaidi, Buster Posey announced that Putila would not remain general manager and instead will have a new role within the organization.

=== Atlanta Braves ===
On November 4, 2024, Putila was hired to serve as the assistant general manager for the Atlanta Braves.
