= Joshua D. Coval =

American economist

- Born: Joshua David Coval
- Education: University of Michigan; UCLA Anderson School of Management
- Occupation: Economist

Joshua David Coval is an American economist. He was the Jay O. Light Professor in the department of business administration at Harvard Business School. He previously was an assistant professor of finance at the University of Michigan Ross School of Business.

Coval attended the University of Michigan, earning his BA degree and MA degree in economics in 1992. He also attended the UCLA Anderson School of Management, earning his PhD degree in business economics in 1996.

In 2000, Coval won the Smith Breeden Prize by the The Journal of Finance for the paper "Home Bias at Home: Local Equity Preference in Domestic Portfolios". His win was shared with Toby Moskowitz. In 2005, he won again, but for the paper "Do Behavorial Biases Affect Prices?". His win was shared with Tyler Shumway.
