= Paul DePodesta =

American sports executive (born 1972)

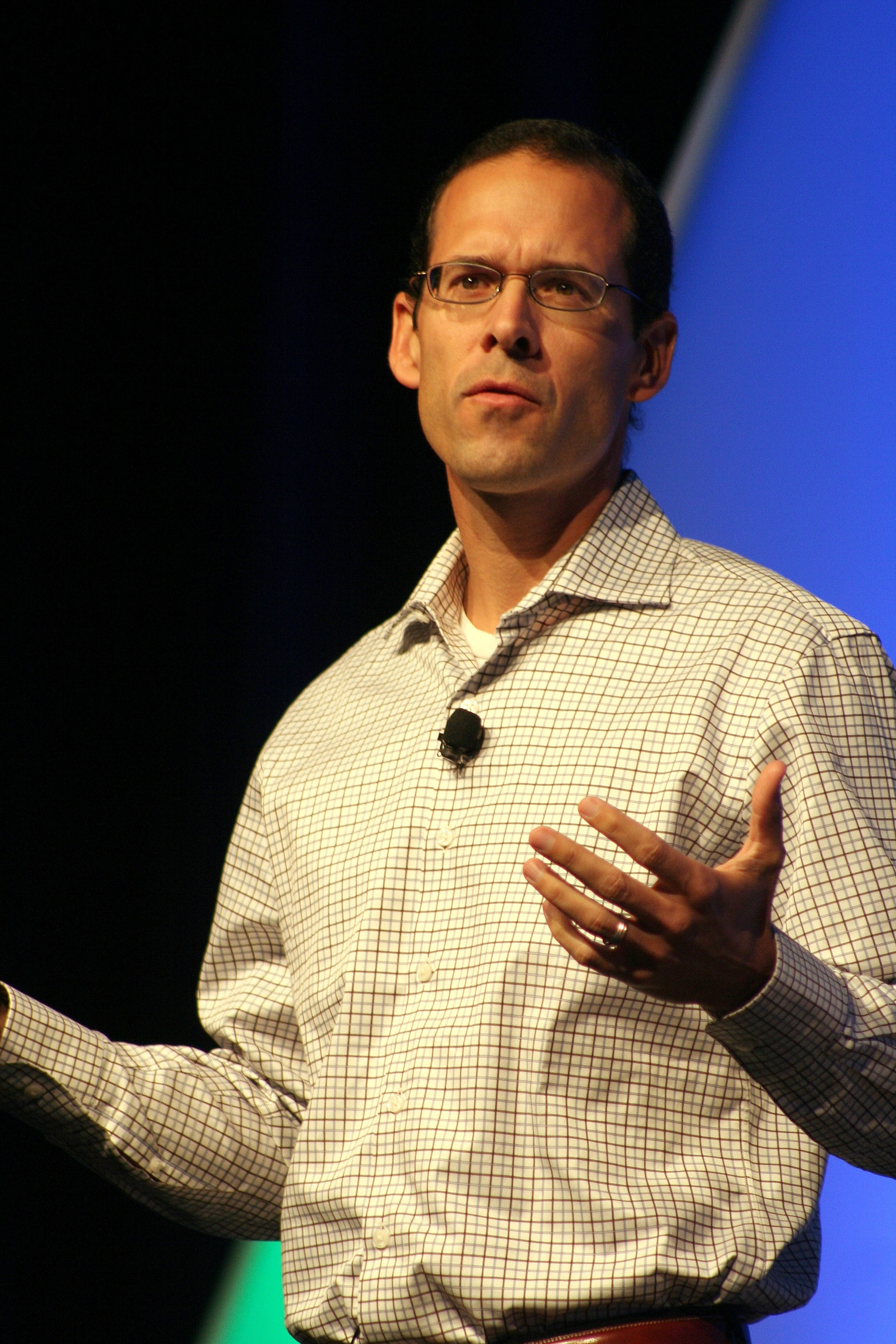
- DePodesta in 2011
- Born: December 16, 1972 (age 53); Alexandria, Virginia, U.S.
- Education: Harvard University (1995)
- Occupations: Colorado Rockies president of baseball operations and former American football executive
- Years active: 1996–present
- Spouse: Karen Deicas (m. 1996)
- Children: 4

Paul DePodesta (born December 16, 1972) is an American sports executive who is the president of baseball operations of the Colorado Rockies of Major League Baseball (MLB). He has previously served as a front office assistant in MLB for the Cleveland Indians, Oakland Athletics and New York Mets, and as a general manager for MLB's Los Angeles Dodgers. He has also served as the chief strategy officer for the Cleveland Browns of the National Football League (NFL). He is also known for his appearance in the book and movie Moneyball about his early career as an assistant with the Athletics.

== Early life ==
DePodesta was born on December 16, 1972, in Alexandria, Virginia. He grew up with Thad Levine. He attended Episcopal High School ('91) and then Harvard University, where he played baseball and football and graduated in 1995 with a degree in economics. He began his career as a sports executive with an internship for the Baltimore Stallions of the Canadian Football League in 1995.

== Career ==
=== Early career ===
In 1996, DePodesta got his first baseball job with the Cleveland Indians, where he spent three seasons. He spent the 1996 season as a player development intern, and was promoted to advance scout for the 1997–1998 seasons. Later in the 1998 season, he was appointed special assistant to general manager John Hart.

In 1999, he joined the Oakland Athletics organization as the assistant general manager, serving as second-in-command to general manager Billy Beane. DePodesta was a key figure in Michael Lewis's book Moneyball. The book thrust the analytical principles of sabermetrics into the mainstream.

=== Los Angeles Dodgers ===
At the age of 31, DePodesta was named general manager of the Los Angeles Dodgers on February 16, 2004, making him the fifth-youngest general manager in baseball history.

DePodesta's reliance on sabermetric principles has been somewhat controversial. He is often considered part of a new breed of front office executives whose personnel decisions depend heavily on analysis of performance data, often at the perceived expense of more traditional methods of scouting and observation.

One of DePodesta's most notable moves was made at the 2004 trading deadline. He traded catcher Paul Lo Duca, relief pitcher Guillermo Mota and outfielder Juan Encarnación to the Florida Marlins in exchange for pitcher Brad Penny, first baseman Hee Seop Choi and pitcher Bill Murphy, in what was reportedly an attempt to pick up pieces to acquire pitcher Randy Johnson from the Arizona Diamondbacks. DePodesta was heavily criticized in the local and national baseball media for this trade, because Lo Duca was thought to be the "heart and soul" of the team. The Dodgers made the playoffs anyway, with Penny developing into one of the better pitchers in the National League during his stint with the Dodgers, which lasted until the end of the 2008 season. Choi, however, was a disappointment, batting just .161 in 2004 and .253 in 2005, and striking out 80 times in 320 at bats. Bill Murphy was traded that year to acquire Steve Finley, who hit 13 homers in 58 games, including a memorable grand slam that clinched the division title. Lo Duca played through 2005 with the Marlins and then went to the New York Mets, the Washington Nationals and back to the Marlins, making his final Major League appearance in September 2008.

During the 2004 offseason, Adrián Beltré, who had hit 48 home runs in 2004, signed with Seattle as a free agent, spurning DePodesta's offer of 3 years for $30 million for Seattle's offer of 5 years for $64 million. DePodesta signed J. D. Drew, Jeff Kent, and Derek Lowe. Drew enjoyed two productive seasons as a Dodger and then used an opt-out clause in his contract to sign a new 5-year deal with the Boston Red Sox. Both Kent and Lowe put in four productive seasons for the Dodgers and cut ties with the franchise at the end of the 2008 season with Kent retiring and Lowe signing a contract with the Atlanta Braves.

Coming off the successes of 2004, the 2005 season saw the Dodgers lose a number of players to significant stints on the disabled list. Many of the players lost to injury were expected to produce heavily for the team, including J. D. Drew, Milton Bradley, Éric Gagné, Jayson Werth, César Izturis and Odalis Pérez. The 2005 season resulted in the team's worst record since 1992 and second worst since moving to Los Angeles in 1958. On October 29, 2005, Dodgers owner Frank McCourt fired DePodesta, citing his desire to see the club win and that DePodesta had not met those expectations. Reports surfaced that the real reason McCourt had fired DePodesta was his inability to find satisfactory managerial candidates to replace Jim Tracy. He was later replaced by Ned Colletti, who hired Grady Little as manager. Some have speculated that McCourt fired DePodesta in response to media criticism from Los Angeles Times sports columnists T. J. Simers and Bill Plaschke, who were vehemently "anti-Moneyball" and referred to DePodesta pejoratively as "Google Boy."

=== San Diego Padres and New York Mets ===
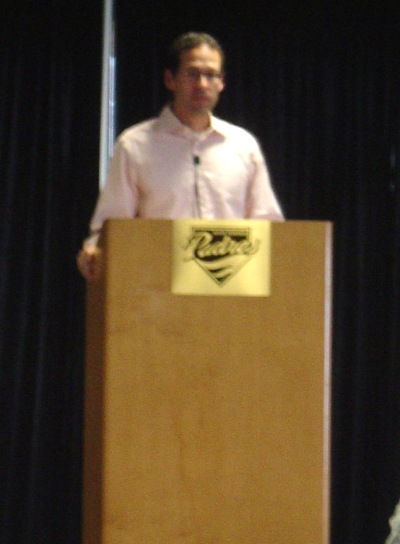
DePodesta with the San Diego Padres in 2008

On June 30, 2006, DePodesta was hired as the special assistant for baseball operations for the San Diego Padres and was promoted to executive vice president on November 10, 2008.

On November 8, 2010, DePodesta was hired as the vice president of player development and scouting for the New York Mets by general manager Sandy Alderson, with whom DePodesta worked when Alderson was CEO of the Padres.

=== Cleveland Browns ===
On January 5, 2016, DePodesta was hired by the Cleveland Browns of the National Football League (NFL) as its chief strategy officer.

On July 31, 2021, it was reported that the Browns and DePodesta had agreed to a 5-year contract extension.

On March 18, 2022, DePodesta helped to facilitate a trade for Deshaun Watson. Watson and the Texans' 2024 sixth-round draft pick were traded to the Cleveland Browns in exchange for the Browns' first-round draft picks in 2022, 2023, and 2024, as well as the Browns' third-round pick in 2023 and fourth-round picks in 2022 and 2024. As part of the trade, Watson signed a new, fully guaranteed, five-year, $230 million deal with the Browns, making it the largest contract at the time and most guaranteed money in the NFL. It has since been considered one of the worst contracts in NFL history.

After nearly 10 years of working in Cleveland, including the team's first two playoff berths since 2002 but also the winless 2017 campaign, the Browns announced in November 2025 that DePodesta was "stepping down."

=== Colorado Rockies ===
The Colorado Rockies of MLB named DePodesta their president of baseball operations on November 7, 2025.

=== Other ventures ===
On December 13, 2012, DePodesta joined the Sears Holdings Corporation board of directors. He has also served as a keynote speaker at numerous business conventions and been covered by publications such as Baseball Prospectus and Fortune Magazine.

== Personal life ==
DePodesta is married to artist and philanthropist Karen Deicas and has three sons and a daughter. In 2016, Deicas launched the Sports Mind Institute, which seeks to connect lessons learned from figures in professional sports, athletes, team executives, and coaches, to help others apply them to life and the business sector. The family resides in the La Jolla neighborhood of San Diego, California.

=== Moneyball ===
In 2003, author Michael Lewis was interested in how Oakland Athletics general manager (GM) Billy Beane tried to find quality players to improve the team while struggling with one of the smallest payrolls in Major League Baseball. He first wanted to write an article on the subject, but the idea eventually blossomed into a book named Moneyball: The Art of Winning an Unfair Game. Lewis's interests included how Beane hired DePodesta as his assistant to incorporate sabermetrics, an approach that consists of more sophisticated analyses of baseball statistics, which is at least partially credited for their 2002 20-game winning streak which set an American League record.

Lewis's book examines the lives and careers of various baseball personalities and explains the art of sabermetrics. Bill James, who coined the term sabermetrics for the Society for American Baseball Research (SABR), is also a major focus. James published The Bill James Baseball Abstract from 1977 to 1988 and wrote several sabermetrics books. Beane and DePodesta had studied James' work and were inspired by his knowledge of baseball analysis.

DePodesta did not feel comfortable in the spotlight after the book's release, nor did he care for the secrets revealed about his scouting methods. The book earned DePodesta a reputation as a cold calculator, choosing players based only on their numbers. In addition, he was thought of as a guy who knew nothing of "real baseball."

In reality, DePodesta played football in college and wanted to be a football coach, seen in a photo wearing number 17. After graduating from Harvard with a degree in economics, he became an intern for the Canadian Football League's Baltimore Stallions in 1995. In early 1996, he got his first baseball job with the Cleveland Indians, where he worked as a scout. In October 1996, at age 24, he was promoted to the position of advance scout. In October 1998, he became assistant to the general manager for the team. Those experiences led to him being hired by Beane as his assistant with the Oakland A's in November 1998.

When the movie Moneyball was adapted from the book, DePodesta did not approve of the way his character was portrayed. "There were a handful of things. Some were factual, others were more ephemeral." He had no objection to Jonah Hill's performance. "Jonah was awesome. He was so respectful of me and my time. It would have been flattering to be portrayed by someone of his expertise. It had nothing to do with the casting," DePodesta said in 2010. "I just could never get comfortable with the idea of somebody else portraying me to the rest of the world. Like any movie, to make it interesting, there has to be some conflict there. In some respects, a lot of the conflict is going to revolve around my character, and that was never really the case in reality," he said in 2011. He also talked about the focus that was brought on him, first in 2003 and again in 2011. "The other problem was I wasn't all that interested in the attention. It had already happened from the book. And I didn't necessarily need to relive it."

The role was originally going to be given DePodesta's name and portrayed by Demetri Martin, but DePodesta did not want his name or likeness to be used in the movie, so the character was named Peter Brand. Brand is a composite of Beane's assistants in Oakland, not an accurate representation of any specific person, but Moneyball's director, Bennett Miller, has credited DePodesta for being generous and helpful in the making of the film. Hill was nominated for an Academy Award for Best Supporting Actor for his performance.

Sporting positions
Preceded by Dan Evans	Los Angeles Dodgers General Manager; 2004–2005	Succeeded by Ned Colletti
