= Perry Minasian =

American baseball executive (born 1980)

Atlanta Braves
- General manager
- Born: Chicago, Illinois

Teams
- As scout: Texas Rangers (2003–2009); Toronto Blue Jays (2009–2017); As assistant general manager: Atlanta Braves (2017–2020); As general manager: Los Angeles Angels (2020–2026)

Perry Minasian (born April 1980) is an American professional baseball executive. He is the former general manager of the Los Angeles Angels of Major League Baseball. He previously served as a scout and assistant general manager in the Toronto Blue Jays and Atlanta Braves organizations, respectively.

== Early life ==
Minasian was raised in the Dallas-Fort Worth metroplex of Texas, where he became involved in baseball when he was eight years old as a batboy for the Texas Rangers. His father, Zack, also worked with the team as an assistant clubhouse manager. Minasian played baseball while attending Lamar High School in Arlington, and at the University of Texas at Arlington.

== Career ==
Minasian became a clubhouse attendant for the Rangers in 1996. In 2003, he was hired as a scout for the Rangers. He would later serve as a staff assistant to then-manager Buck Showalter.

In 2009, Minasian was hired as a scout by the Toronto Blue Jays and spent several seasons as the team's director of pro scouting. In his final two seasons with the team, the Blue Jays reached the American League Championship Series.

Minasian was hired as an assistant general manager by the Atlanta Braves in September 2017 under John Coppolella. He was then promoted to vice president of baseball operations under Alex Anthopoulos. Minasian had previously worked with Anthopoulos in Toronto. The Braves won the National League East in each of Minasian's three seasons, reaching the National League Championship Series in 2020.

In November 2020, following the firing of Billy Eppler, Minasian was named the general manager of the Los Angeles Angels. He signed a four-year contract. In August 2024, Minasian and the Angels agreed to a two-year contract extension.

The Angels fired Minasian on June 26, 2026. His announced replacement, on an interim basis, was former St. Louis Cardinals general manager John Mozeliak.

== Personal life ==
Minasian and his wife, Michelle, have four children.

Minasian has three brothers; Calvin, Zack, and Rudy. Calvin is the clubhouse and equipment director for the Atlanta Braves while Zack is the general manager of the San Francisco Giants. Rudy practices law in Chicago.

Minasian is of Armenian descent.
