= Thad Levine =

American baseball executive (born 1971)

- General Manager
- Born: November 12, 1971 (age 54); Alexandria, Virginia, U.S.

Teams
- Los Angeles Dodgers (1998); Colorado Rockies (1999–2005); Texas Rangers (2006–2016); Minnesota Twins (2017–2024)

Thad Levine (born November 12, 1971) is an American professional baseball executive. He formerly served as the senior VP and general manager for the Minnesota Twins of Major League Baseball (MLB) from 2017 to 2024.

== Early life and education ==
Levine was born in Alexandria, Virginia. He played youth soccer with Paul DePodesta. Levine attended Haverford College, where he played NCAA Division III college baseball. He attained his bachelor's degree in 1994. He also graduated from the University of California, Los Angeles in 1999 with an MBA. He has two daughters and a son.

== Career ==
Levine joined the Los Angeles Dodgers in business development. He moved to the Colorado Rockies in 1999, and worked there successively as an assistant director, director, and senior director. Levine was appointed to the position of Texas Rangers assistant general manager in October 2005.

Levine was hired as the Minnesota Twins' general manager on November 3, 2016. On October 4, 2024, after 8 years with the Twins, Levine stepped down from his position and departed the organization.

The Milwaukee Brewers hired Levine as a special advisor on January 10, 2026.
