= List of Major League Baseball managers =

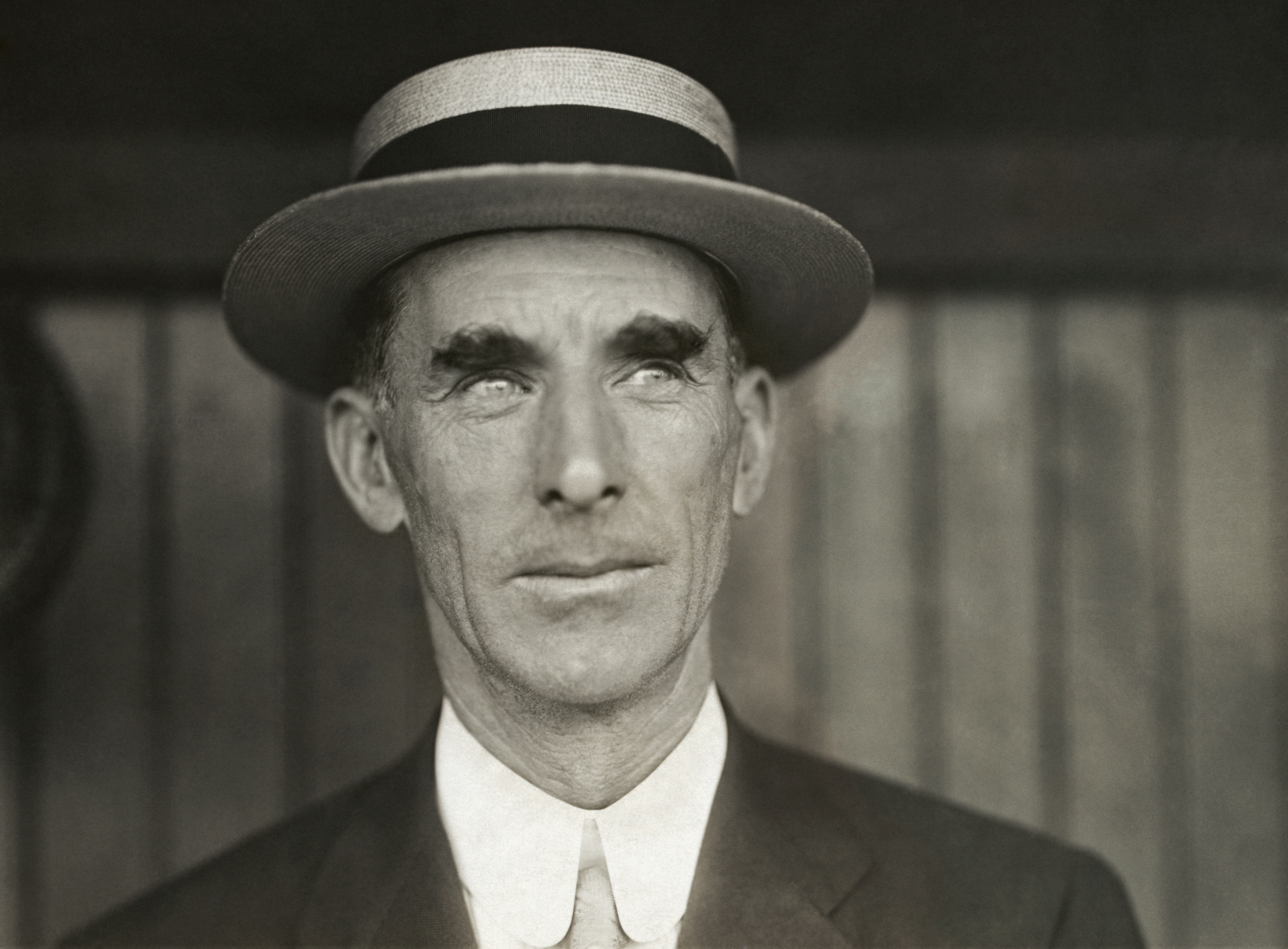
Connie Mack holds the records for most wins (3,731) and losses (3,948) by a Major League Baseball manager.

Major League Baseball (MLB) is the highest level of play in North American professional baseball and is the organization that operates the National League and the American League. In 2000, the two leagues were officially disbanded as separate legal entities, and all of their rights and functions were consolidated in the commissioner's office. Since that time, MLB has operated as a single league. Composed of 30 teams, MLB is one of the four major professional sports leagues in the United States and Canada.

Each team in the league has a manager who is responsible for team strategy and leadership on and off the field. Assisted by various coaches, the manager sets the line-up and starting pitcher before each game and makes substitutions throughout the game. In early baseball history, it was not uncommon for players to fill multiple roles as player-managers; specifically, they managed the team while still being signed to play for the club. The last player-manager in Major League Baseball was Pete Rose, who began managing the Cincinnati Reds in 1984.

As of the end of the 2025 MLB regular season, the longest-tenured active manager with the same team in Major League Baseball is Kevin Cash, who has led the Tampa Bay Rays of the American League since 2015. The longest-tenured active manager with the same team in the National League is Dave Roberts, who has led the Los Angeles Dodgers since 2016.

Connie Mack holds the Major League Baseball record for most games won as a manager, with 3,731, and most managed with 7,755. The all-time leaders in championships won in the World Series era (1903–present) are Joe McCarthy and Casey Stengel, who each won seven championships with the New York Yankees.

== National League ==
List of current National League managers
Team	Division	Manager	Date of hire	Previous
Arizona Diamondbacks	West	Torey Lovullo	November 4, 2016	Chip Hale
Atlanta Braves	East	Walt Weiss	November 3, 2025	Brian Snitker
Chicago Cubs	Central	Craig Counsell	November 6, 2023	David Ross
Cincinnati Reds	Central	Terry Francona	October 3, 2024	David Bell
Colorado Rockies	West	Warren Schaeffer	May 11, 2025	Bud Black
Los Angeles Dodgers	West	Dave Roberts	November 23, 2015	Don Mattingly
Miami Marlins	East	Clayton McCullough	November 10, 2024	Skip Schumaker
Milwaukee Brewers	Central	Pat Murphy	November 15, 2023	Craig Counsell
New York Mets	East	Andy Green	June 26, 2026	Carlos Mendoza
Philadelphia Phillies	East	Don Mattingly	April 28, 2026 (Note: Mattingly was promoted to interim manager on April 28, 2026, and announced as the team's full-time manager on October 14, 2026.)	Rob Thomson
Pittsburgh Pirates	Central	Don Kelly	May 8, 2025	Derek Shelton
San Diego Padres	West	Craig Stammen	November 6, 2025	Mike Shildt
San Francisco Giants	West	Tony Vitello	October 22, 2025	Bob Melvin
St. Louis Cardinals	Central	Oliver Marmol	October 25, 2021	Mike Shildt
Washington Nationals	East	Blake Butera	October 31, 2025	Dave Martinez

=== East Division ===
==== Atlanta Braves ====
The Atlanta Braves National League franchise originated in Boston, Massachusetts in 1871. The team has employed 45 managers, who have led the team in three different cities: Boston (1871–1952), Milwaukee, Wisconsin (1953–1965), and Atlanta (1966–present). The first manager was Harry Wright. The longest-tenured manager is Bobby Cox, who retired at the end of the 2010 season. Cox served as skipper of the Braves for 21 consecutive seasons (1990–2010), and holds the major league record for managerial ejections, with 162. 161 of those games were in the regular season, and 1 game was in spring training. Cox' win–loss record was 2,058–1,638 with the Braves (he previously managed the Toronto Blue Jays). He won four Manager of the Year Awards (1985, 1991, 2004–2005) and led the Braves to 14 consecutive division titles (3 in the National League West and 11 in the East; 1991–2005 excluding the 1994 strike-shortened season), winning one World Series in 1995. Fredi González succeeded Cox as manager. Gonzalez was fired on May 17, 2016. On May 17, 2016, the Atlanta Braves named Brian Snitker as their interim manager and the 47th manager in club history. He was named permanent manager on October 11, 2016. Snitker stepped down on October 1, 2025. On November 3, 2025, the Braves named Walt Weiss their new manager, making him the 48th manager in franchise history.

==== Miami Marlins ====
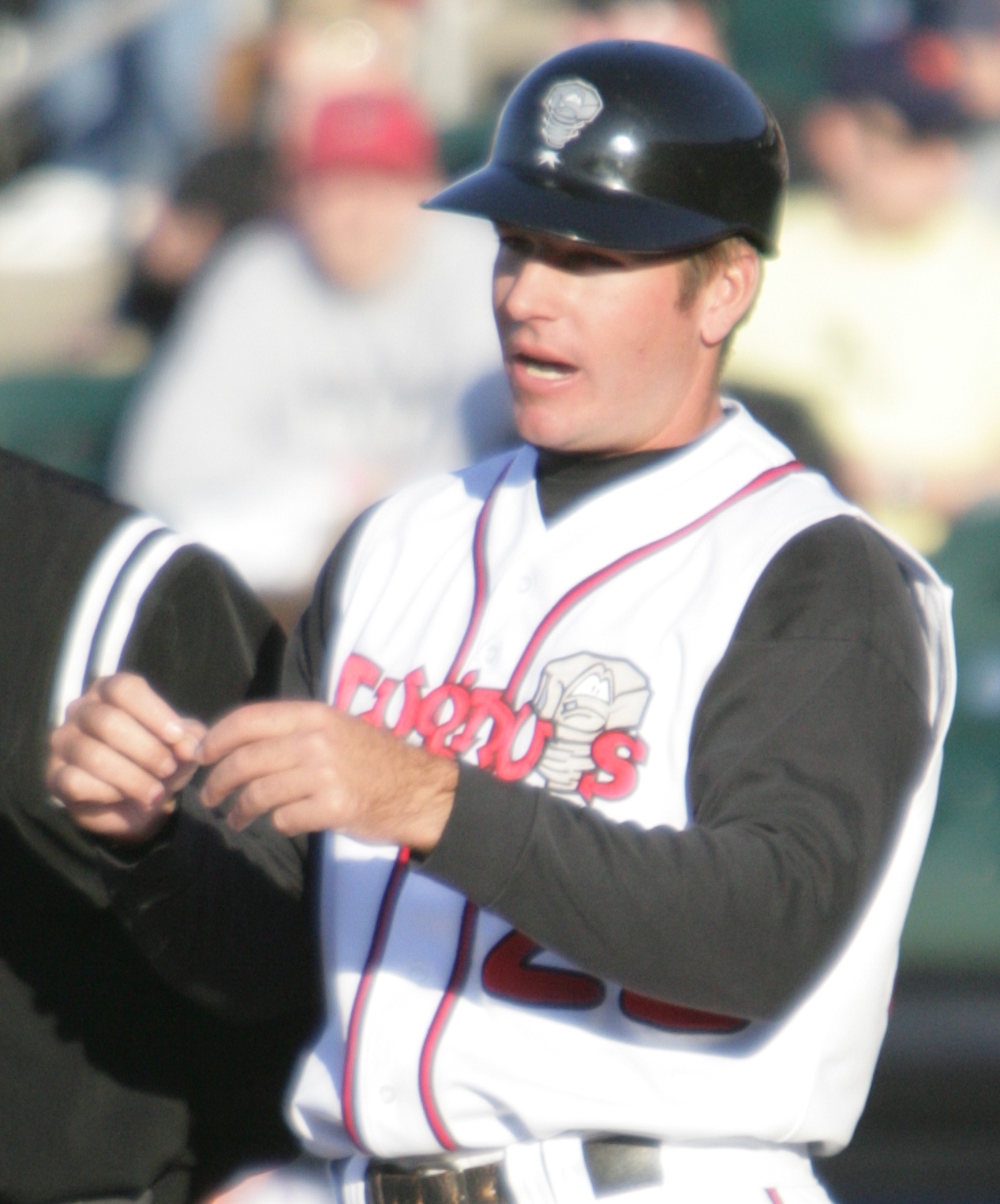
McCulolugh as a coach for the Lansing Lugnuts

The Marlins franchise entered the National League in 1993 as an expansion team and was known as the Florida Marlins until 2011. The franchise's first manager was Rene Lachemann, who accumulated 285 losses during his four-season tenure. Jim Leyland and Jack McKeon each guided the team to World Series victories, in 1997 and 2003, respectively; however, the team has never won a division title. Marlins managers have never lost a playoff series, and Miami is the only franchise in Major League Baseball to accomplish the feat. McKeon is the franchise leader in wins (281). Joe Girardi won the Manager of the Year Award in his only season managing the Marlins (2006). He is the only manager to win the award while fielding a team with a losing record, and he's the only manager to win with a team that finished in fourth place in its division. Jack McKeon was named the team's interim manager in 2011, having been named to the position following the mid-season resignation of Edwin Rodríguez. At the conclusion of the 2011 season, the Marlins hired Ozzie Guillén to be their manager for the 2012 season; however, he was fired following his first season. The Marlins then named Mike Redmond as their manager. Redmond was subsequently fired on May 17, 2015, and replaced by Dan Jennings on an interim basis. After the 2015 season, Don Mattingly signed a four-year contract to become the club's 15th manager. On September 25, 2022, Mattingly stated that he and the Marlins mutually agreed that he would finish the season as manager, and not return to the role in 2023. On October 25, 2022, Skip Schumaker was hired as team's manager. Schumaker resigned after the 2024 season. On November 11, 2024, the Marlins hired Clayton McCullough as manager.

==== New York Mets ====
The successor to two previous National League franchises in New York City (the Giants and the Dodgers), the New York Mets have existed since 1962 and have played in Queens since 1964, when they vacated the Polo Grounds in Manhattan and moved to Shea Stadium. Casey Stengel was the first of twenty managers. Gil Hodges led the team to their first championship in the 1969 World Series. Davey Johnson is the franchise leader in regular-season wins, with 595 during his seven-season tenure, and he led the Mets to their most recent title in the memorable 1986 World Series. Bobby Valentine managed the team during their next deep playoff run to the 2000 World Series. Terry Collins holds the record for most games managed at 1134, and his Mets record was 551–583. Combined with his managerial tenures with the Houston Astros and Anaheim Angels, his record was 995–1017. The Mets made the playoffs in Collins' fifth season as manager, and played in the 2015 World Series. Terry Collins retired after the 2017 season and was replaced by former Indians Pitching Coach Mickey Callaway who became the club's 21st manager. After two lackluster seasons Callaway was fired on October 3, 2019. On November 1, 2019, the Mets hired their former All-Star center fielder Carlos Beltrán to be their 22nd manager. After Beltran was implicated in the Houston Astros sign stealing scandal, he and the Mets agreed to a mutual parting of ways. On January 22, 2020, the Mets hired quality control coach Luis Rojas as the team's next manager. After 2021 season, the Mets announced that they would not pick up the 2022 option for Rojas. On December 20, 2021, Buck Showalter was announced as the club's 24th manager. Showalter announced that he won't return to the Mets for 2024 season. Carlos Mendoza was named as manager on November 13, 2023. Mendoza was fired during the 2026 season. Andy Green was hired as interim manager.

==== Philadelphia Phillies ====
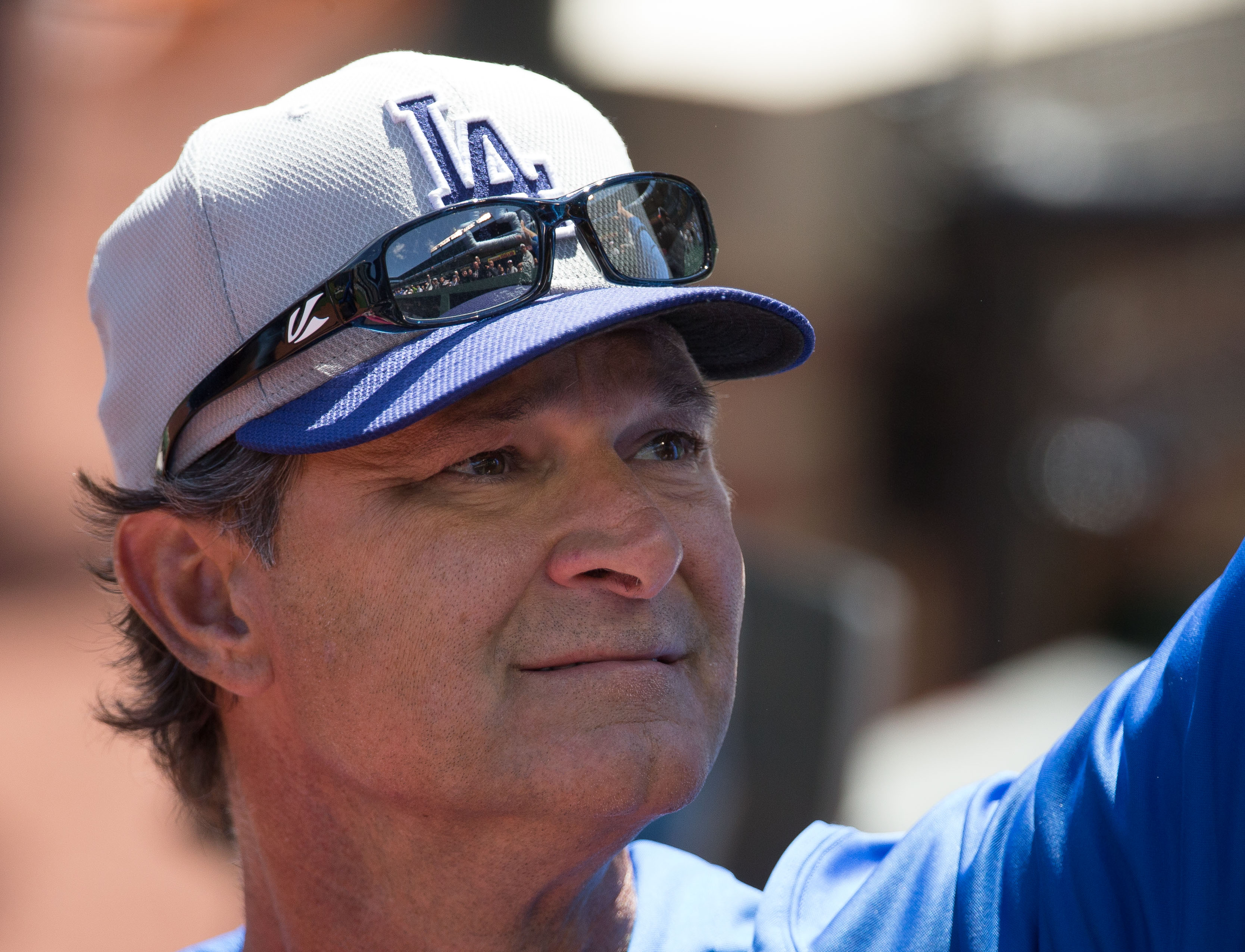
Mattingly with the Dodgers in 2013

The National League franchise in Philadelphia was established in 1883 following the dissolution of Worcester. The team adopted the Philadelphia Phillies name in 1884 and has used the moniker since that time. The team's first manager was Bob Ferguson. Charlie Manuel was the manager from 2005 to 2013 until he was fired on August 16, 2013. Manuel was the first Phillies manager since Dallas Green in 1980 to win a World Series (2008) and the first to lead his team to at least three consecutive playoff appearances since Danny Ozark (1976–1978). Manuel's career managerial record is 867–678, having previously managed the Cleveland Indians; his record with the Phillies was 780–636 surpassing Gene Mauch's previous regular season record of 645 wins (1960–68). The Phillies won five consecutive division championships (2007–2011) and back-to-back National League pennants (2008–2009) during Manuel's tenure. Manuel has the most postseason wins (27) in team history, while Ozark has the most playoff losses (9). Larry Bowa is the only Phillies skipper to capture the Manager of the Year Award, which he won in 2001. Four Phillies managers have been inducted into the Philadelphia Baseball Wall of Fame for service to the Phillies: Paul Owens, Bowa, Gavvy Cravath, and Green. Following Charlie Manual's firing in 2013, 3rd base coach Ryne Sandberg was promoted to manager. Sandberg resigned on June 26, 2015, and Pete Mackanin was the hired as a replacement. On September 29, 2017, the club announced that Mackanin would not return as manager. The following day, the Phillies hired Gabe Kapler to be their 54th manager. After two unsuccessful seasons with the club, Kapler was fired. On October 24, 2019, the Philadelphia Phillies hired Joe Girardi as their 55th manager, replacing Kapler. Girardi was fired after a disappointing start to the 2022 season and was replaced by bench coach Rob Thomson. Thomson was fired on April 28, 2026. Don Mattingly was named as interim manager for the remainder of the 2026 season, and was retained as the full-time manager after the season.

==== Washington Nationals ====
The Washington Nationals franchise was established in Montreal, Quebec in 1969 as an expansion team. Originally known as the Montreal Expos, the team's first manager was Gene Mauch, who led the team for seven seasons. Felipe Alou is the manager with the most wins (691) and losses (717) in franchise history. He won the 1994 Manager of the Year Award with the club. Jim Fanning was the only Expos club manager to appear in the Major League Baseball postseason; his .529 regular season winning percentage was the highest in franchise history. The only other Expos manager with a winning percentage above .500 is Buck Rodgers (.510), who won the 1987 Manager of the Year Award. After the team relocated to Washington, D.C. in 2004, Dusty Baker was hired as the manager on November 3, 2015, and fired on October 20, 2017. On October 29, 2017, the Nationals named Dave Martinez as their 31st manager. Martinez led the team through their longest ever playoff win through their first World Series title in 2019. Martinez was fired on July 6, 2025. Miguel Cairo was named interim manager the next day. On October 31, 2025, Blake Butera was announced as the new manager of the Nationals. At age 33, he became the youngest MLB manager since the Minnesota Twins hired Frank Quilici in 1972.

=== Central Division ===
==== Chicago Cubs ====
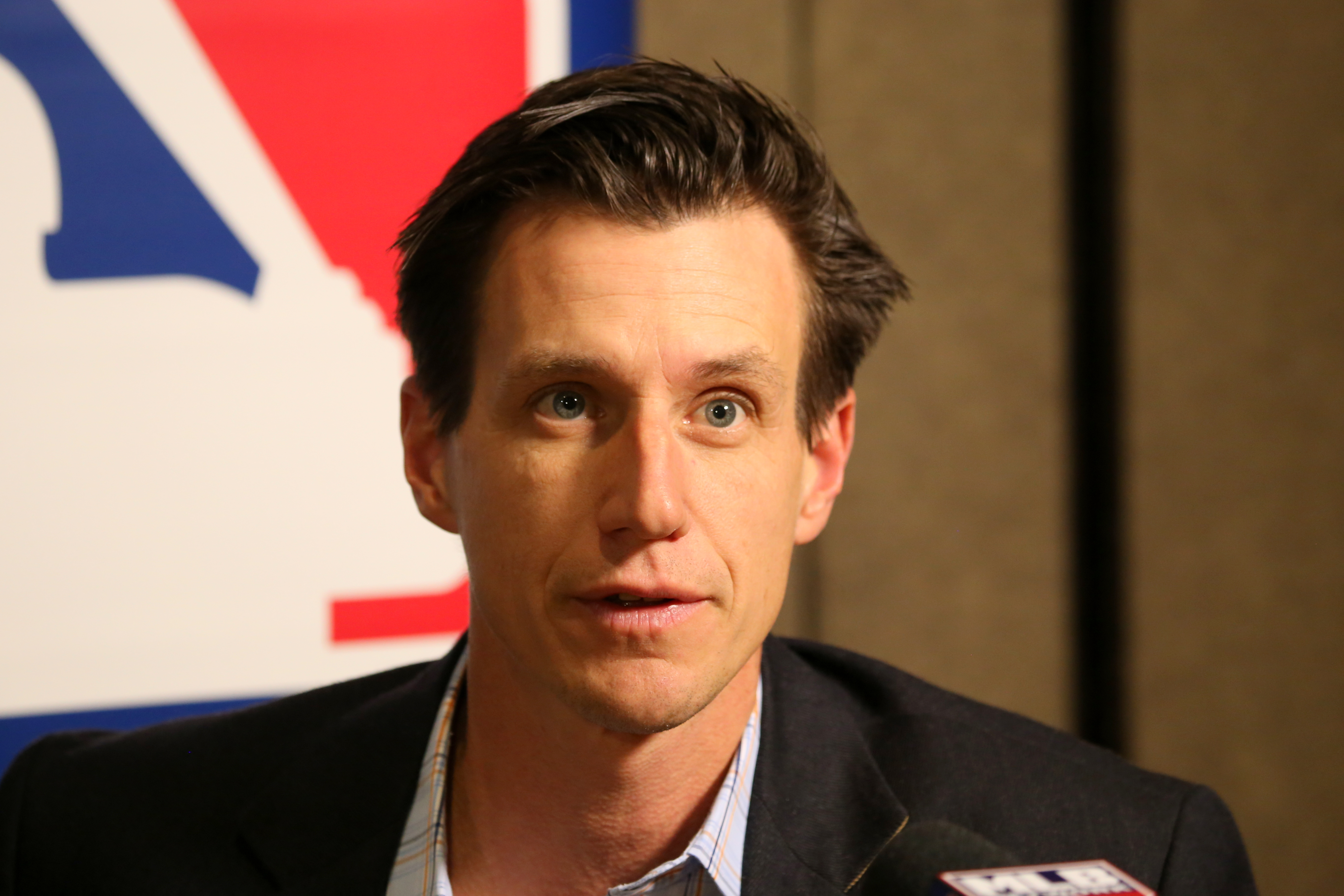
Counsell with the Brewers

The Chicago Cubs franchise began as the Chicago White Stockings in 1876, with Albert Spalding as the franchise's inaugural manager. The team's second manager, Cap Anson, set team records in games managed (2,194), seasons managed (18), and wins (1,242). Frank Chance, part of the famous Tinker to Evers to Chance double-play combination—all of whom managed the franchise at some point—has the best winning percentage in club history (.664) and led the Cubs franchise to World Series victories in 1907 and 1908. During the early 1960s, owner Philip K. Wrigley utilized a "College of Coaches", using a rotating system of multiple managers rather than a single field leader. Lou Piniella managed the Cubs from 2007 to 2010 and led the team to consecutive postseason appearances in 2007 and 2008, becoming the first manager to lead the team to multiple postseasons since Charlie Grimm's four appearances from 1932 to 1935. Dale Sveum was hired for the 2012 season and fired after the 2013 season. Rick Renteria replaced Sveum as manager. Sveum was fired after the 2014 season. On November 2, 2014, Joe Maddon was named the club's 60th manager. On October 24, 2019, the Cubs hired former catcher David Ross as their 61st manager. On November 6, 2023, the Cubs made a surprising move to fire Ross, and hired former Brewers manager Craig Counsell as the team's 62nd manager.

==== Cincinnati Reds ====
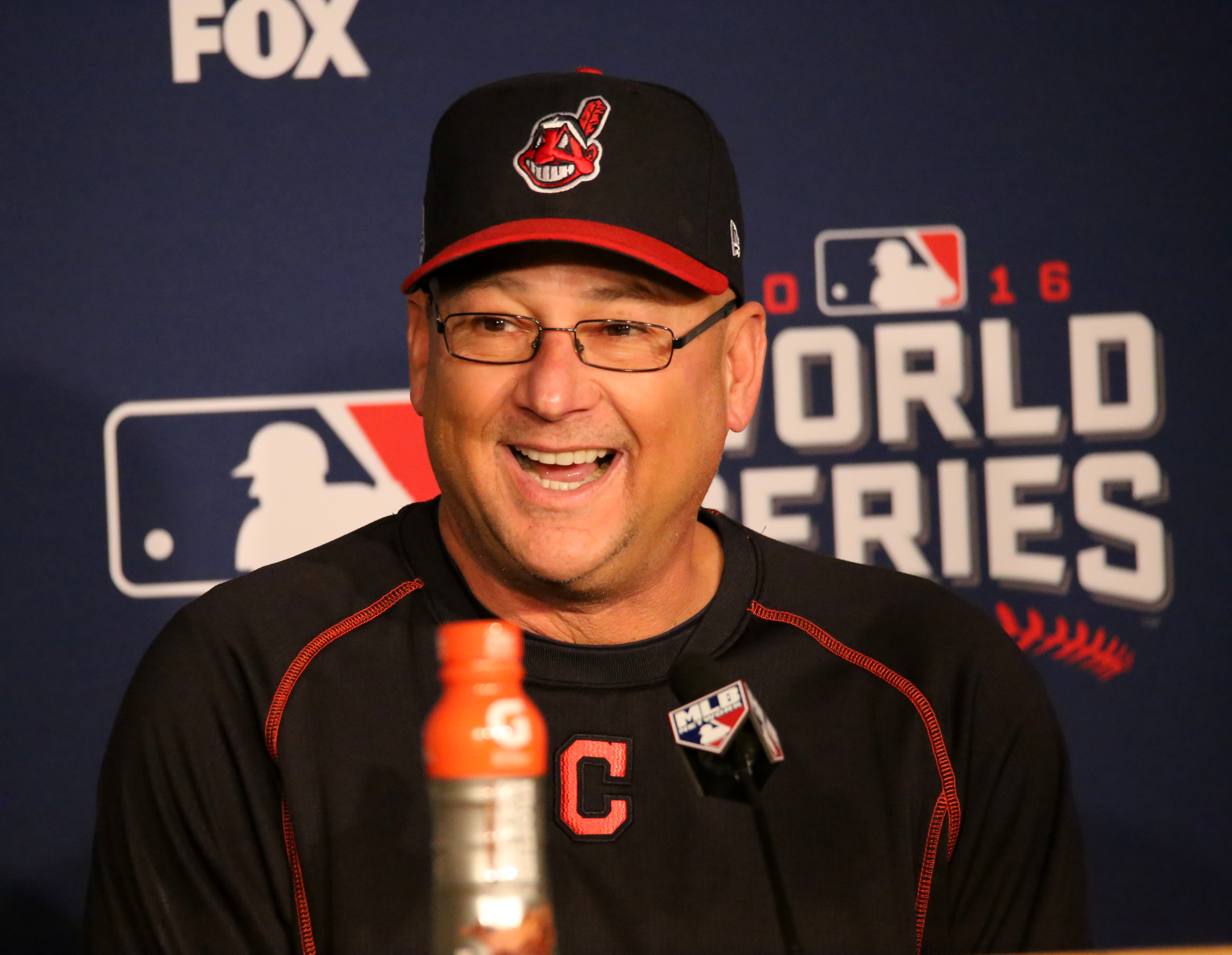
Francona with the Guardians

Similar to their division counterparts, the Cincinnati Reds were established as the Cincinnati Red Stockings in 1882, and have employed 59 managers under 3 different team names since that time. The team's first manager was Pop Snyder, who led the team to an American Association championship in their inaugural season. His .648 winning percentage is highest among Reds managers who have led the team for more than one complete season. Seven managers have led the franchise to the postseason, while four have won World Series: Pat Moran in 1919; Bill McKechnie in 1940; Sparky Anderson in 1975 and 1976; and Lou Piniella in 1990. Anderson is the franchise's all-time leader in regular-season games managed (1,450) and regular-season games won (863). Jack McKeon is the only manager to win the Manager of the Year Award with the team. Jim Riggleman was hired on April 19, 2018, as the interim manager after Bryan Price was fired. Riggleman was not retained after the season. On October 21, 2018, the Cincinnati Reds announced that David Bell had been hired as the 63rd manager in franchise history. Bell was fired with 5 games left of 2024 season, Freddie Benavides managed the final 5 games. Terry Francona was hired as new manager on October 4, 2024.

==== Milwaukee Brewers ====
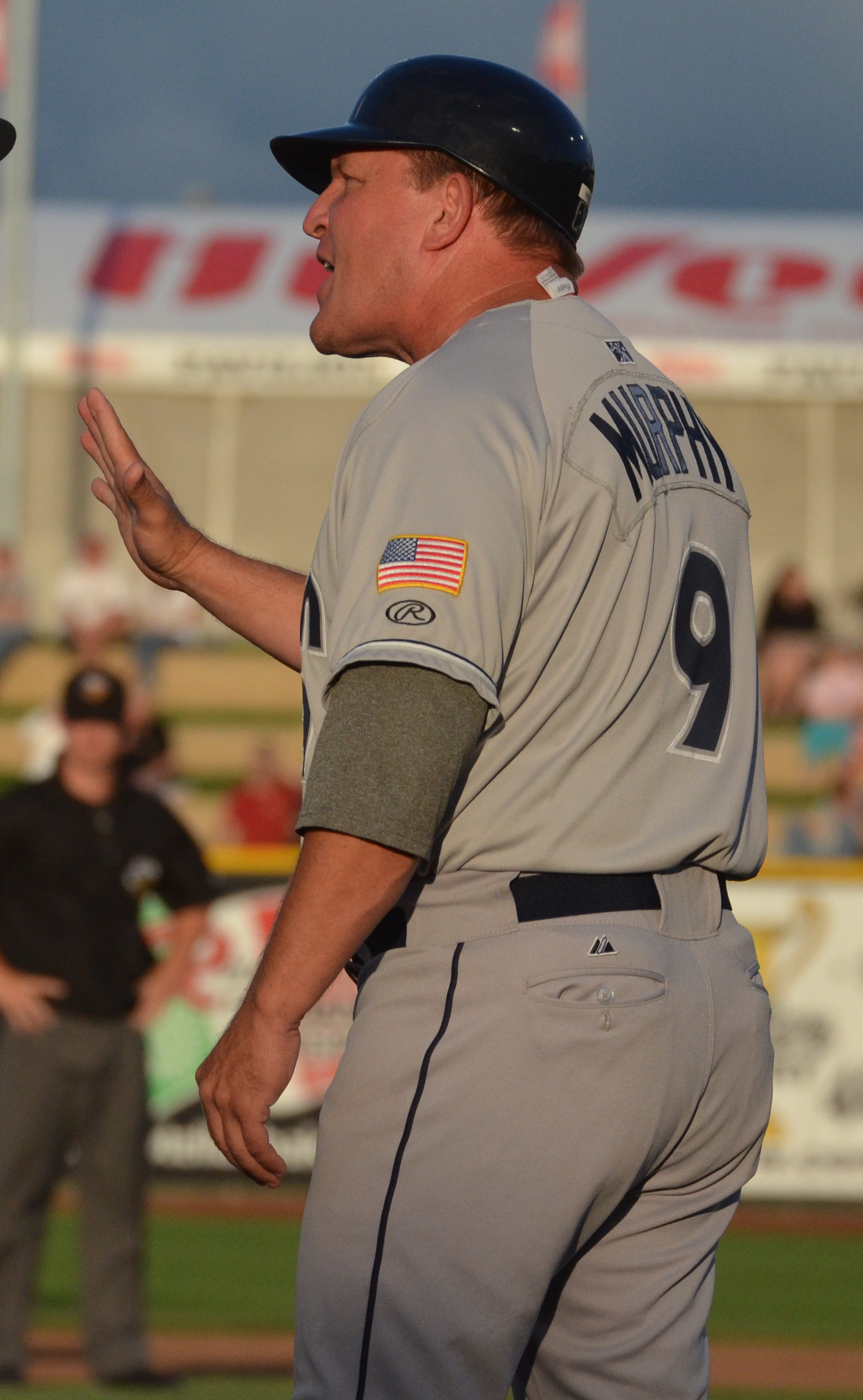
Murphy as a coach with the Tucson Padres

Established in 1969 as the Pilots in Seattle, Washington, the team moved to Milwaukee, Wisconsin the following season, which brought top-flight baseball back to Wisconsin for the first time since the Braves departed after the 1965 season. The Brewers have been members of the National League since 1998; prior to that, the team played as a member of the American League Central Division. As such, they are one of only two teams, along with the Houston Astros, to appear in the Major League Baseball postseason representing both major leagues. Buck Rodgers and Harvey Kuenn led the team to one American League playoff appearance each, and Dale Sveum led the team to the 2008 National League wild card after replacing the fired Ned Yost with 12 games remaining in the season. Kuenn is the only manager inducted into the Milwaukee Brewers Walk of Fame. Ron Roenicke was hired on November November 2, 2010. Ron Roenicke was fired on May 3, 2015. The Brewers hire Craig Counsell as the team's new manager. and the franchise's all-time managerial playoff wins leader (7). After 2023 Counsell leaves the Brewers to manage the Cubs for the 2024 season. On November 15, 2023, the Brewers promote bench coach Pat Murphy to be the team's new manager.

==== Pittsburgh Pirates ====
The Pittsburgh Pirates joined the National League in 1887 after five seasons as members of the American Association. Al Pratt was the first manager in franchise history, while the first manager after joining Major League Baseball was Horace B. Phillips. Fred Clarke, who managed from 1900 through 1915, holds franchise records in wins and losses (1422–969), as well as winning percentage among managers who led the team for a full season or more (.595). Clarke was the first manager to lead the team to the postseason and to win a World Series; other managers to do so include Bill McKechnie (one playoff appearance, one World Series victory), Chuck Tanner (one playoff appearance, one World Series victory), and Danny Murtaugh, who leads franchise managers with two World Series victories and five playoff appearances. John Russell was fired after a terrible 2010 season. Clint Hurdle was hired as the club's 46th manager on November 14, 2010. Hurdle fired before the final game of the 2019 season, Tom Prince managed the final regular season game of 2019. Derek Shelton was named as the 47th manager on November 27, 2019. Shelton was fired on May 8, 2024. Don Kelly was named as interim manager on the same day.

==== St. Louis Cardinals ====
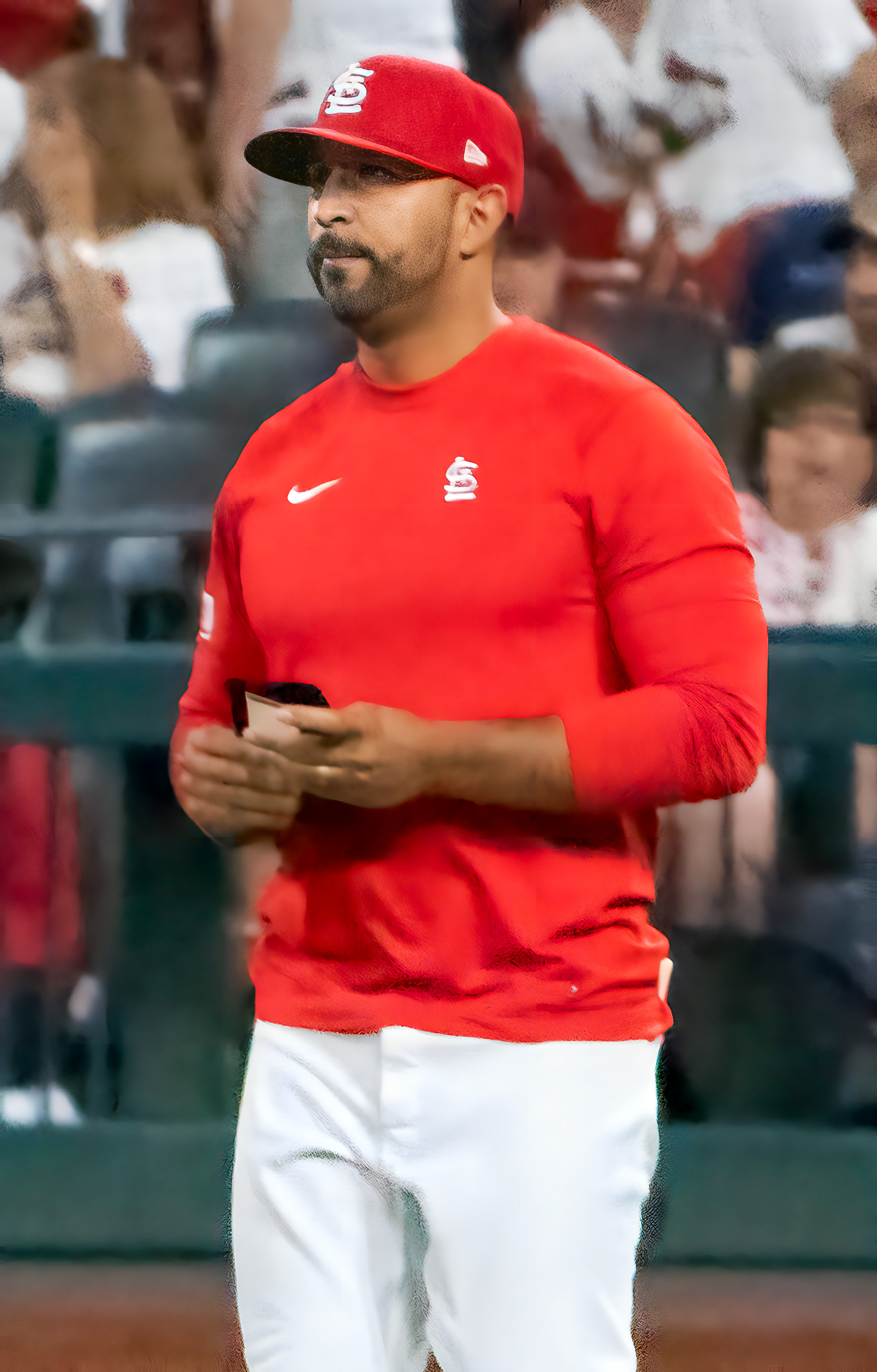
Marmol in 2023

Since their 1882 establishment, the St. Louis Cardinals, originally known as the St. Louis Browns, have employed 64 managers. Ned Cuthbert was the franchise's original manager. Tony La Russa leads the team in regular-season and postseason wins (1,231 and 33), regular-season and postseason losses (1,029 and 25), and playoff appearances (7). La Russa and Hall of Famer Billy Southworth both won two World Series, which is tied for the most in club history by a single manager. Charles Comiskey leads the team in winning percentage (.685)^{[b]} and is one of thirteen Cardinals managers who have been elected to the Baseball Hall of Fame—three of whom (Comiskey, Southworth, Red Schoendienst) had multiple tenures with the club. La Russa and Whitey Herzog each won a Manager of the Year award with the Cardinals (Herzog in 1985 and La Russa in 2002, the fourth of his career). On July 14, 2018, Mike Matheny was fired by the cardinals. Mike Shildt was hired as the club's 64th manager on an interim basis. On August 28, 2018, he was named the permanent manager. Shildt was fired on October 14, 2021, due to philosophical differences. On October 25, 2021, Oliver Marmol was hired as club's 65th manager.

=== West Division ===
==== Arizona Diamondbacks ====
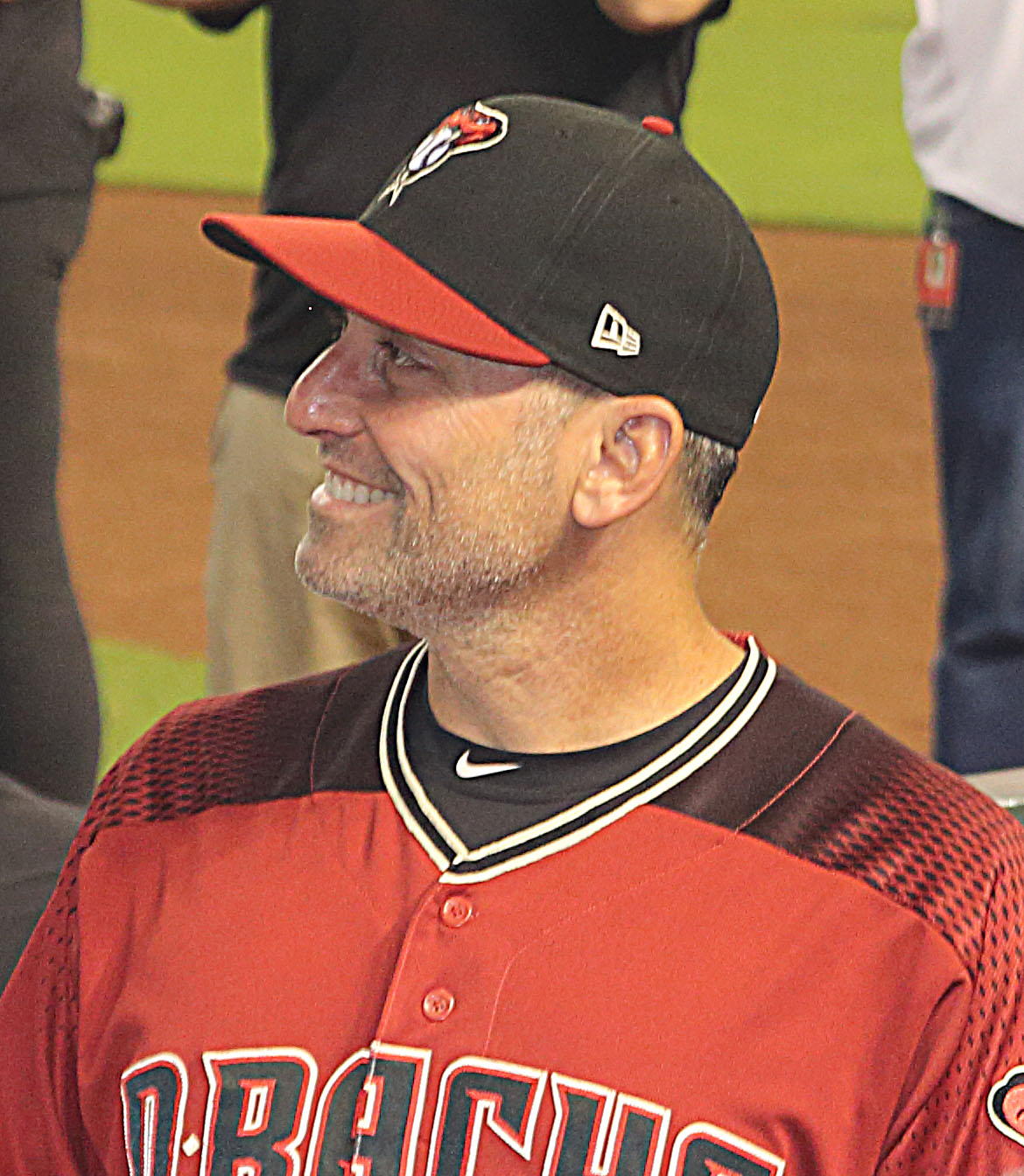
Lovullo with the Diamondbacks

Nine managers have led the Arizona Diamondbacks since their entry into the National League as an expansion team in 1998. Buck Showalter was the team's inaugural manager, winning 250 games in three seasons. Bob Brenly, tied with the most postseason wins (11), is the only manager to win a World Series with the club, in only its fourth season of existence. During the 2004 season, Brenly was replaced by his third-base coach, Al Pedrique, who won 22 out of his 83 games managed. Wally Backman was hired as the Diamondbacks 4th manager on November 1, 2004, but was fired four days later on November 5, 2004, due to off-field issues. Because he didn't coach any games, Backman isn't considered to have been a manager. Bob Melvin took over beginning in 2005, amassing a .500 winning percentage in his 486 games managed. Kirk Gibson was promoted from bench coach to take over as manager after A. J. Hinch's dismissal in July 2010, and remained as manager before being fired with three games left in the 2014 season. After firing Gibson, bench coach Alan Trammell managed the club for the remaining three games, despite also being fired. The Diamondbacks then named former Oakland Athletics bench coach, Chip Hale, as the club's 8th manager. He was replaced after the 2016 season by Torey Lovullo who is the club's 9th manager and has the most wins in franchise history (750) and postseason wins (11).

==== Colorado Rockies ====
The Colorado Rockies have had seven managers since the franchise was founded in 1993. Don Baylor, the team's inaugural manager, has a .484 winning percentage, which is best among managers who have led the team for one full season or more. He led the team for five seasons, accruing a record of 440–469. Jim Leyland followed Baylor, managing the Rockies for one season and amassing a 70–92 record, after which he was replaced by Buddy Bell. Bell led the Rockies for parts of three seasons until he was replaced during the 2002 season by Clint Hurdle, the team's 4th manager. Hurdle, who managed the team from 2002 until his firing during the 2009 season, leads the franchise in managerial regular-season wins (535) and losses (625), as well as playoff wins (7) and losses (4). Jim Tracy, who was Hurdle's bench coach, replaced him on May 29, 2009. The Rockies went 74–42 during his partial season at the helm, advancing to the 2009 National League Division Series; for his efforts, Tracy was named Manager of the Year. Walt Weiss was named the Rockies manager for 2013 after Tracy resigned. Weiss led the Rockies to a respectable 2013 campaign and was rewarded with a 3-year contract extension in October 2013. Weiss resigned after the 2016 season. Bud Black was hired as club's 7th manager on November 7, 2016. Black and was fired during the 2025 season. Warren Schaeffer was named as interim manager. On November 24, 2025, the Rockies announced that Schaeffer will return as full time manager for the 2026 season.

==== Los Angeles Dodgers ====
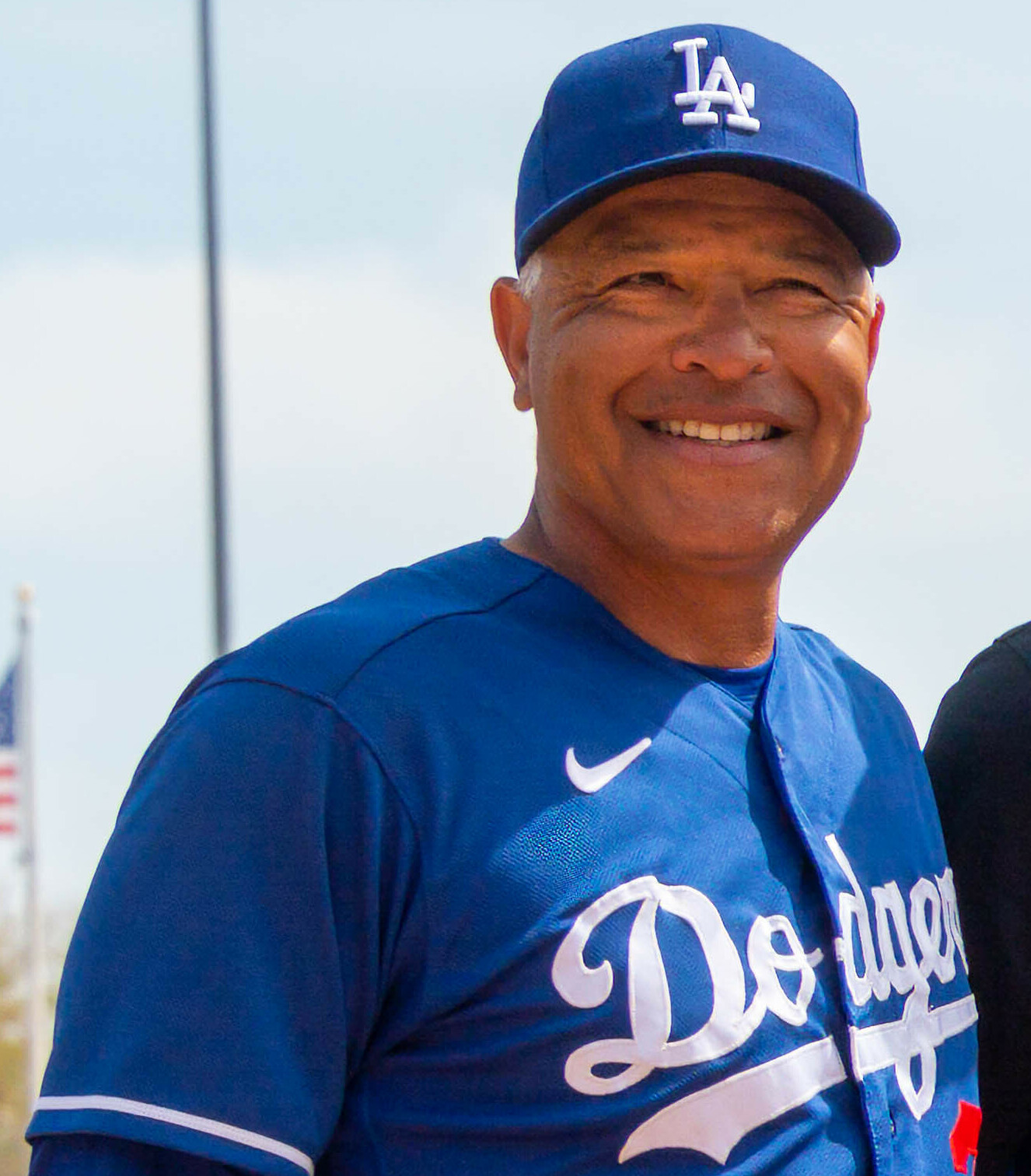
Roberts with the Dodgers

The Los Angeles Dodgers began play in 1884 as the Brooklyn Atlantics and were known by several nicknames before adopting the Dodgers name in 1932. Since its inception, the franchise has employed 32 managers. George Taylor was the team's manager for their inaugural 1884 season. From 1954 to 1996, the team employed only two managers, who hold many of the team's managerial records. Walter Alston led the team from 1954 until the end of the 1976 season, during which time he won 2,040 games and lost 1,613; both totals are franchise records, along with his 22 seasons managed. He was replaced at the end of the 1976 season by Tommy Lasorda, who managed the team until 1996. Lasorda is second behind Alston in wins (1,599) and losses (1,439), holds the franchise records for playoff wins (31) and losses (30), and won two Manager of the Year Awards (1983 and 1988). Alston, Lasorda, and Roberts are the only managers to lead the team to a World Series championship, with Alston winning four during his tenure, Lasorda winning two, and Roberts winning three. Bill McGunnigle leads all Dodgers managers^{[c]} in winning percentage (.660). Two managers, Leo Durocher and Burt Shotton, had multiple tenures with the team. Hall of Famers to lead the franchise include Alston, Durocher, Lasorda, Casey Stengel, John Montgomery Ward, Wilbert Robinson, Ned Hanlon, Max Carey, and Burleigh Grimes; the last three were inducted primarily as players rather than managers. Following the 2015 season, Dave Roberts was named the club's 32nd manager.

==== San Diego Padres ====
The San Diego Padres joined Major League Baseball as an expansion team in 1969. Preston Gómez managed the team from the inaugural season until 1972. In total, the franchise has had 19 managers. Bruce Bochy is the manager with the longest tenure, leading the team for 12 seasons from 1995 through 2006. Bochy is also the only Padres skipper to win the Manager of the Year Award and leads the team in regular-season wins (951) and losses (975), as well as playoff wins (8) and losses (16). The franchise leader in winning percentage among managers who have led the team for a full season or more is Jack McKeon (.541 over three seasons). Besides Bochy, Dick Williams is the only Padres manager to lead the team to a National League pennant; Williams won 337 games in his four seasons with the club and is the only one of San Diego's nineteen managers to be elected to the Hall of Fame. Bud Black was hired prior to the number 2007 season, but he was fired on June 15, 2015. He was replaced by Dave Roberts for 1 game. Then Pat Murphy took over for the remainder of the season. On October 29, 2015, Andy Green was named 19th manager of the Padres. Green was fired during the 2019 season with 8 games remaining, Rod Barajas managed the remaining 8 games. Jayce Tingler was hired on October 28, 2019, as the Padres new manager. Tingler was fired after 2021 season. On November 1, 2021, Bob Melvin was named as club's 22nd manager. After the 2023 season Melvin left the Padres, to manage the Giants for the 2024 season. On November 21, 2023, the Padres promoted Mike Shildt as manager. Shildt announced his retirement on October 13, 2025. On November 6, 2025, the Padres announced Craig Stammen as their new manager.

==== San Francisco Giants ====
The San Francisco Giants were originally established as the New York Gothams in 1883. In its 143-year history, the franchise has employed 36 managers. The first manager in franchise history was John Clapp. John McGraw leads the team in regular-season wins (2,583) and losses (1,790), games managed (4,424), and playoff wins (26) and losses (28). McGraw and Bruce Bochy's three championships each are tied for most all-time among Giants managers; other managers to win the league's championship with the franchise include Jim Mutrie (two), Durocher (one), and Bill Terry (one). Mutrie leads all Giants managers in winning percentage (.605). Hall of Famers to lead the team on the field include McGraw, Ward, Durocher, Terry, George Davis, Cap Anson, Buck Ewing, Mel Ott, and Frank Robinson—who became the first African-American manager in Major League Baseball when he was hired by the Cleveland Indians. Bruce Bochy managed the Giants from 2007 until his retirement in 2019. On November 12, 2019, Gabe Kapler was hired to be the club's 37th manager, but was fired at the end of the 2023 MLB season, so Kai Correa served as the 38th manager on an interim basis for the final three games. On October 25, 2023 Bob Melvin was hired as the team's 39th manager. Melvin was fired after 2 disappointing seasons. The Giants hired Tony Vitello as manager on October 22, 2025.

== American League ==
List of current American League managers
Team	Division	Manager	Date of hire	Previous
Athletics	West	Mark Kotsay	December 21, 2021	Bob Melvin
Baltimore Orioles	East	Craig Albernaz	October 26, 2025	Brandon Hyde
Boston Red Sox	East	Chad Tracy	April 26, 2026	Alex Cora
Chicago White Sox	Central	Will Venable	October 31, 2024	Pedro Grifol
Cleveland Guardians	Central	Stephen Vogt	November 6, 2023	Terry Francona
Detroit Tigers	Central	A. J. Hinch	October 30, 2020	Lloyd McClendon
Houston Astros	West	Brad Ausmus	November 11, 2026	Joe Espada
Kansas City Royals	Central	Matt Quatraro	October 30, 2022	Mike Matheny
Los Angeles Angels	West	Vacant	October 21, 2026	Kurt Suzuki
Minnesota Twins	Central	Derek Shelton	October 29, 2025	Rocco Baldelli
New York Yankees	East	Aaron Boone	December 1, 2017	Joe Girardi
Seattle Mariners	West	Jason Kanzler	November 3, 2026	Dan Wilson
Tampa Bay Rays	East	Kevin Cash	December 5, 2014	Joe Maddon
Texas Rangers	West	Skip Schumaker	October 3, 2025	Bruce Bochy
Toronto Blue Jays	East	John Schneider	July 13, 2022	Charlie Montoyo

=== East Division ===
==== Baltimore Orioles ====
The Baltimore Orioles franchise was established in 1901 in Milwaukee, Wisconsin as the Brewers (not to be confused with the National League team), with Hugh Duffy as its inaugural manager. The following season, the team moved to St. Louis, Missouri, adopted the St. Louis Browns name, and changed managers to Jimmy McAleer. For the 1954 season, the Browns moved to Baltimore, Maryland, where they became the Orioles, named after Maryland's state bird, and named Jimmie Dykes their new manager. In total, the franchise will have employed 43 managers since its inception upon the hiring of its new manager. Earl Weaver leads Orioles managers in regular-season wins (1,480) and losses (1,060), playoff wins (28) and losses (18), and American League pennants (4). Weaver was the second of three managers to lead the Orioles to a World Series championship, preceded by Hank Bauer and followed by Joe Altobelli. Luman Harris is the franchise leader in winning percentage among managers who have led the team for more than one full season. Members of the National Baseball Hall of Fame and Museum to manage the club include Duffy, Weaver, Bobby Wallace, Branch Rickey, George Sisler, Rogers Hornsby, Jim Bottomley, and Frank Robinson, though Weaver is the only one to have been inducted to the Hall for his accomplishments as a manager. Juan Samuel was the Orioles' interim manager, having replaced Dave Trembley, but was replaced by Buck Showalter as the club's 42nd manager in August 2010. Showalter was fired on October 3, 2018. On December 14, 2018, the Baltimore Orioles named Brandon Hyde their 43rd manager. Hyde was fired on May 17, 2025, he was replaced by 3rd base coach Tony Mansolino for the rest of the 2025 season. On October 26, 2025, Craig Albernaz was hired as the team's manager.

==== Boston Red Sox ====
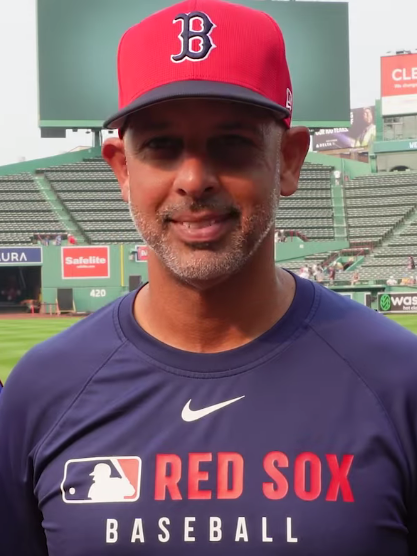
Alex Cora, the most recent manager to lead the Red Sox to a World Series title

The Boston Red Sox of Boston, Massachusetts, began play in 1901 as the Americans and adopted the Red Sox name in 1908. Jimmy Collins was the team's first manager; following the departure of Bobby Valentine at the end of the 2012 season, former Boston pitching coach John Farrell became manager. Joe Cronin, a Hall of Famer elected as a player, holds franchise records for the most regular-season managerial wins and losses (1,071–916), while the team's most successful postseason manager is Terry Francona, (28–14 in 42 playoff games managed). Francona and Bill Carrigan each led the team to two World Series championships; other managers to win championships with the team include Collins, who won the first World Series in 1903, Jake Stahl, and Ed Barrow, whose 1918 championship was the team's last until Francona's 2004 win, which is sometimes attributed to the Curse of the Bambino. Stahl is the franchise's leader in winning percentage among managers (.621). Besides Cronin, other Hall of Fame managers to lead the Red Sox include Collins, Bucky Harris, Joe McCarthy, Lou Boudreau, Billy Herman, and Dick Williams; Boudreau and Herman were inducted to the Hall of Fame as players. Farrell was fired after the loss in 2017 ALDS and was replaced by Alex Cora who became the club's 47th manager. Cora was fired on January 14, 2020, after a sign-stealing scandal. Ron Roenicke was hired as the club's 48th manager on an interim basis on February 11, 2020. On November 6, 2020, Cora was brought back as Boston's manager, a role he continued in for five-plus seasons. On April 25, 2026, Cora was fired after the team began the season with a 10–17 record; Chad Tracy was named as the interim manager, becoming the 49th different person to hold the position. Tracy led a turnaround of the team's season, and was named the team's full time manager on September 22, 2026.

==== New York Yankees ====
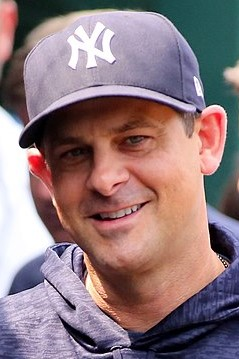
Boone in 2018

The franchise currently known as the New York Yankees was originally established in 1901 as the Baltimore Orioles (unrelated to their current divisional rivals). After moving to New York City in 1903 and adopting the name New York Highlanders, the team was renamed the Yankees in 1913. Since the beginning of the 1901 season, 35 managers have led the Yankees, beginning with John McGraw, who managed the team until the middle of the 1902 season, when he was replaced. Joe McCarthy, who also managed the rival Red Sox, accumulated the most managerial wins (1,460) and losses (867) as a Yankee skipper during his tenure encompassing parts of 16 seasons. While leading the Yankees, McCarthy won 29 playoff games, the franchise's third-highest total, and 7 World Series championships, tied for the most in team history with Casey Stengel. Joe Torre, who led the Yankees for 12 seasons, has the most postseason wins (76) and losses (47) in team history; he won four World Series during his tenure. McGraw, McCarthy, Stengel and Torre are all members of the Hall of Fame, as are Yankee managers Wilbert Robinson, Clark Griffith, Frank Chance, Miller Huggins (who won three World Series championships with the Yankees), Bill Dickey, Yogi Berra, and Bob Lemon; Chance, Dickey, Berra, and Lemon were inducted as players rather than as managers. Also notable among Yankee managers is Billy Martin, who was named the Yankees skipper for five different tenures, leading the team from 1975 to 1978, and during the 1979, 1983, 1985, and 1988 seasons. Joe Girardi was hired prior to the 2008 season and won the 2009 World Series during his second season; however, he was fired after the 2017 season. Aaron Boone was hired as the club's 35th manager on December 4, 2017.

==== Tampa Bay Rays ====
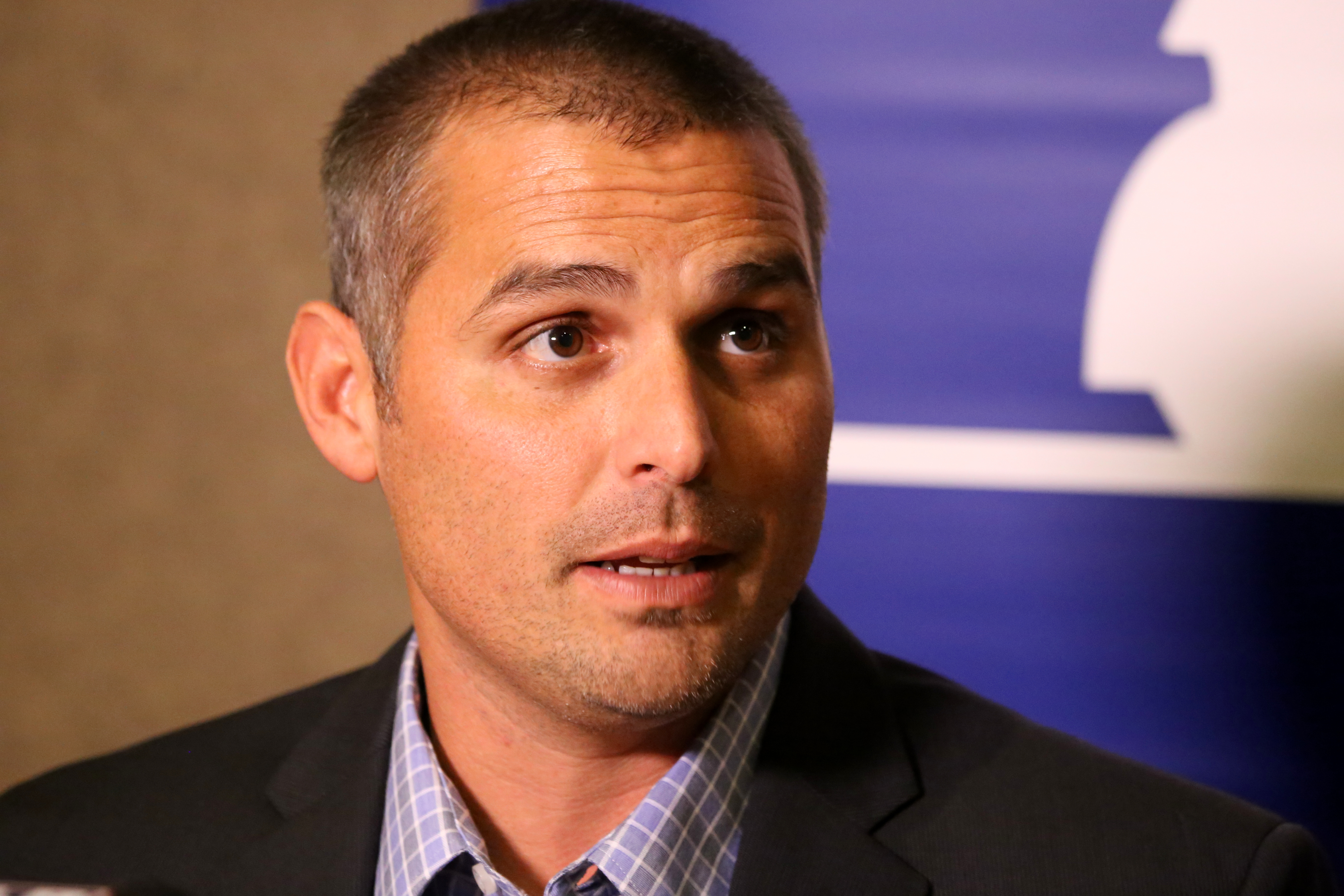
Cash in 2015

The Tampa Bay Rays, originally named the Devil Rays, joined Major League Baseball at its last expansion in 1998. The team's inaugural manager was Larry Rothschild, who spent his entire managerial career with the Rays. He managed the team for parts of four seasons and accrued a 205–294 record. Rothschild was replaced during the 2001 season by Hal McRae. Before the 2003 season, McRae was replaced by Lou Piniella, who led the team for three seasons. After 2005, Piniella departed and was replaced by Joe Maddon, who has statistically been the most successful manager in franchise history. Maddon accumulated an 8–8 record in the postseason, and lead his team to the 2008 World Series. Maddon also won the 2008 and 2011 American League Manager of the Year Award. Maddon resigned after the 2014 season. On December 5, 2014, the Rays hired former Cleveland Indians bullpen coach Kevin Cash as the club's 5th manager. Cash leads all Rays managers in games, wins, and winning percentage. As of October 1, 2026 , he is the longest serving MLB manager.

==== Toronto Blue Jays ====
Since 2005, the Toronto Blue Jays are the only team in Major League Baseball based outside of the United States. Established in 1977, the Blue Jays' first manager was Roy Hartsfield, who held the position for two seasons. Toronto's most successful manager, Cito Gaston, leads the team in regular-season managerial wins (809) and losses (760), postseason appearances (34), and playoff wins (18) and losses (16). He is the only manager to win a championship with the Blue Jays; the team won consecutive championships in 1992 and 1993, becoming the only team to date based outside of the United States to win a World Series and, upon completing their 1993 victory, the first team to win a World Series on foreign soil. Bobby Cox, who managed the team from 1982 to 1985, is the only Blue Jays skipper to win the Manager of the Year Award, which he received in 1985. Charlie Montoyo was hired in 2018 as the club's 16th manager. Montoyo was fired on July 13, 2022. He was replaced by bench coach John Schneider.

=== Central Division ===
==== Chicago White Sox ====
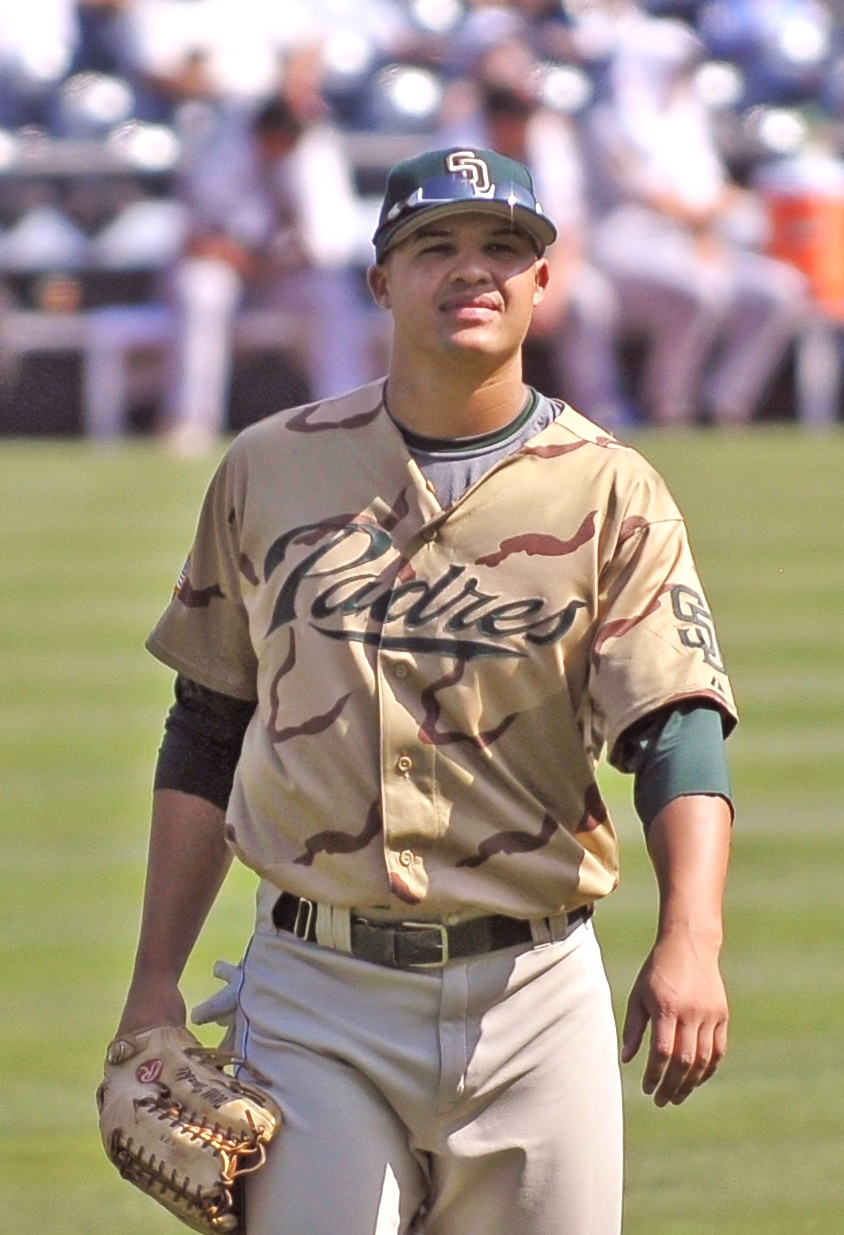
Will Venable as a player for the Padres

Established in 1901, the Chicago White Sox have employed 41 managers since the franchise's inception, beginning with Clark Griffith. Griffith managed the team for two seasons and is one of nine White Sox managers to be inducted into the Hall of Fame; the others include Hugh Duffy, Johnny Evers, Ed Walsh, Eddie Collins, Ray Schalk, Ted Lyons, Al López, Bob Lemon and Larry Doby. Jimmie Dykes is the all-time leader in regular-season wins and losses (899–940), and Fielder Jones' .592 winning percentage leads all White Sox managers. Three managers have led the team to a World Series victory: Jones, Pants Rowland, and Ozzie Guillén. Guillén is also the franchise's leader in playoff victories (12), while Kid Gleason's 5 losses are the highest total in team history. Griffith also won one American League championship before the modern World Series was contested. October 29, 2020, Tony La Russa was hired as team's manager. In late 2022, La Russa stepped down due to health issues. Bench coach Miguel Cairo managed the rest of 2022. On November 1, 2022, the White Sox announced that they hired Pedro Grifol as their new manager. Grifol was fired on August 8, 2024. Grady Sizemore managed the rest of the 2024 season. Will Venable was hired on October 31, 2024, as White Sox manager.

==== Cleveland Guardians ====
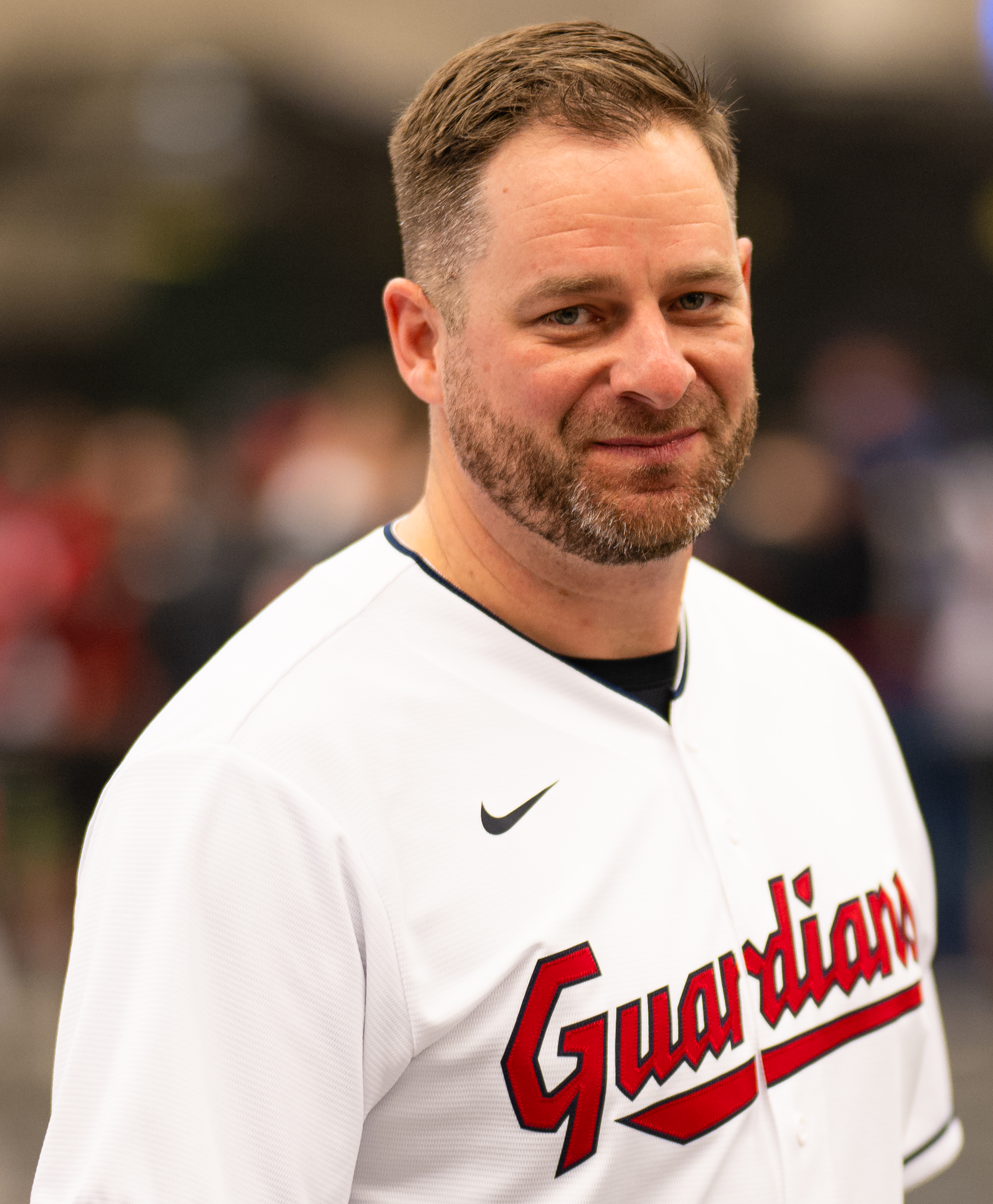
Vogt with the Guardians

The team now known as the Cleveland Guardians has played under several monikers since its inception in 1901, including the Cleveland Blues or Bluebirds, the Cleveland Bronchos, the Cleveland Naps (so named because of popular player and manager Nap Lajoie), and the Cleveland Indians. Forty-six managers have led the team, starting with Jimmy McAleer. Lajoie was the first manager in team history to finish his career with a winning record. Lou Boudreau and Tris Speaker are the only managers to win a championship with Cleveland: Speaker in 1920 and Boudreau in 1948, which was the last championship for the franchise. Other managers to appear in the postseason with Cleveland include Al López, Mike Hargrove (who leads the team in playoff wins and losses with a record of 27–24), Charlie Manuel, and Eric Wedge. Terry Francona, who was hired on October 6, 2012, had been managing the Guardians since 2013. He has the most wins (845), losses (671), and games managed (1516) of any Guardians manager. Francona stepped down after the 2023 season. On November 6, 2023, the Guardians announced that they had hired Stephen Vogt as their 47th manager.

==== Detroit Tigers ====
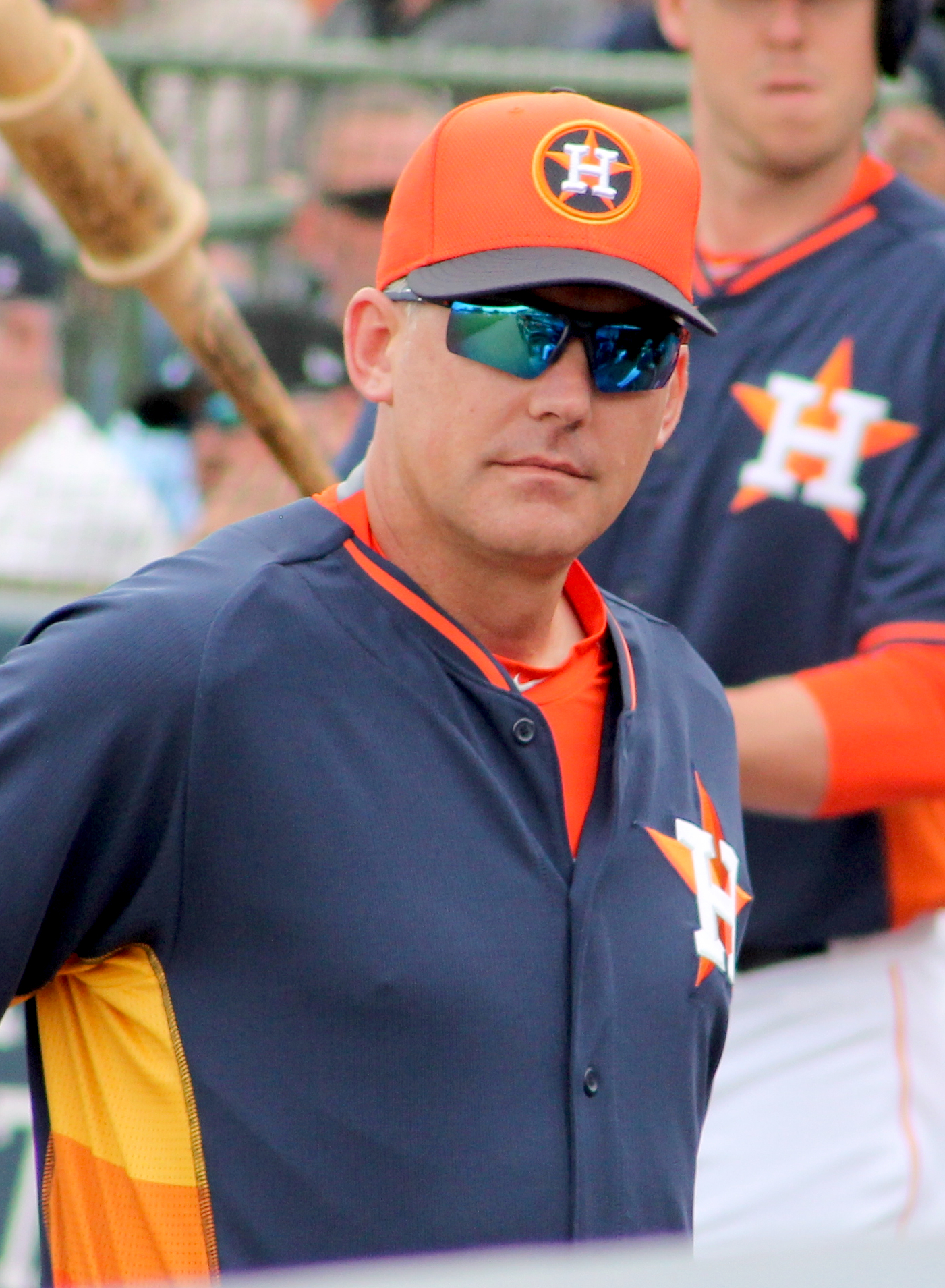
Hinch with the Astros in 2015

The Detroit Tigers were founded as members of the Western League in 1894, employing Bob Glenalvin as their manager. George Stallings was the team's manager from 1898 to 1901 and was the team's field boss when the Western League declared itself a major league and became the American League, thus becoming the franchise's first MLB manager. Sparky Anderson's 1,331 wins and 1,248 losses lead all Tigers managers. He is one of eight Hall of Famers to manage the club; the others include Hughie Jennings, Ty Cobb, Mickey Cochrane, Bucky Harris, Ed Barrow, Joe Gordon and Alan Trammell. Among managers who have led the team for one or more full seasons, Cochrane is the franchise leader in winning percentage (.582) and is one of four skippers to lead the team to a World Series championship. The others are Anderson, Steve O'Neill, and Mayo Smith, who each won one championship with the franchise. Jim Leyland was the manager from 2006 until he retired at the end of the 2013 season. Brad Ausmus was hired before the 2014 season and fired after the 2017 season. On October 20, 2017, Ron Gardenhire signed a three-year contract to become the 47th manager of the club. Gardenhire retired in the middle of 2020 season due to health issues. Lloyd McClendon managed the final 8 games. On October 30, 2020, the Tigers hired AJ Hinch as the 48th manager in club history.

==== Kansas City Royals ====
The Kansas City Royals were added to the American League in a 1969 expansion after the city's first Major League Baseball franchise departed for Oakland, California. Joe Gordon, one of two Hall of Famers to manage the Royals, was selected as the team's first manager, leading the team for one season. Bob Lemon, who took over during the 1970 season, is the second member of the Hall of Fame to lead the team, and managed until the end of 1972. Whitey Herzog is the franchise leader in regular-season wins (410) and winning percentage,^{[d]} (.574), and Tony Muser is the loss leader (431). Dick Howser is the leader in postseason wins and losses (8–12). Trey Hillman led the Royals for parts of three seasons after a five-year managerial career in Japan, but was fired May 13, 2010. The same day, Ned Yost was hired as the 19th manager. Yost retired after the 2019 season. Mike Matheny was hired as the 20th manager on October 31, 2019. On October 5, 2022, Matheny was fired after a nearly 100 loss season in 2022. Matt Quatraro was named as team's manager on October 30, 2022.

==== Minnesota Twins ====
The Minnesota franchise began its life as the Washington Senators in Washington, D. C., where they played from their inception in 1901 to 1960. In the early 20th century, the Senators were managed consecutively by three future members of the Baseball Hall of Fame, bookended by Bucky Harris, who managed the team from 1924 to 1928 and again from 1935 to 1942. Walter Johnson, who was inducted into the Hall of Fame as a player, managed the team for four seasons from 1929 to 1932, and he was followed by Joe Cronin, also inducted as a player, who led for the next two seasons (1933–1934). Clark Griffith is the only other Hall of Famer to manage the franchise. In 1960, the American League awarded an expansion franchise to Minneapolis, Minnesota; however, owner Calvin Griffith moved his team to Minnesota, and Washington was awarded the expansion team instead. Thus, the Minnesota Twins began play in Minnesota the following year, during the tenure of manager Cookie Lavagetto. Harris and Tom Kelly are the two managers to win a World Series championship with the franchise: one in the Senators era (Harris) and two during the team's tenure in Minnesota (Kelly). Kelly is also the franchise leader in wins and losses, and is the only manager to exceed 1,000 in each category (1,140–1,244 in 16 seasons). Ron Gardenhire was fired in October 2014, and he was replaced by Paul Molitor. Molitor himself was fired following the 2018 season. On October 25, 2018, Rocco Baldelli was hired as the 31st manager of the club. Baldelli was fired after the 2025 season. Derek Shelton was named as the new Twins manager on October 29, 2025.

=== West Division ===
==== Houston Astros ====
The city of Houston, Texas was awarded an expansion franchise in the National League in 1962 after the dissolution of the Continental League. The team, which began play as the Colt .45s, changed its name to the Houston Astros in 1965. The team's first manager was Harry Craft, while the first manager under the Astros moniker was Grady Hatton. Bill Virdon is the all-time leader for the most regular-season games managed (1,066) and wins (544), while Phil Garner had won the second most playoff games (7). Larry Dierker, the only manager whose number is retired by the franchise, and he has the second highest winning percentage (.556) in franchise history.^{[a]} Brad Mills replaced Cecil Cooper—who was fired with 13 games remaining in the 2009 season—and Dave Clark, who was Cooper's interim replacement. On August 18, 2012, Mills was fired, and Tony DeFrancesco was named the interim manager. On September 27, 2012, Bo Porter became the 21st manager in Astros history. Porter was fired in September 2014, and replaced with interim manager Tom Lawless. AJ Hinch was hired as the 23rd manager in October 2014. Hinch is the franchise leader in playoff wins and regular season winning percentage. He led the club to its first World Series championship. He was fired on January 13, 2020, after the Astros sign-stealing allegations in the 2017 World Series came to light. Dusty Baker was hired as the club's 24th manager on January 29, 2020. Baker announced his retirement after 2023 postseason. Bench Coach Joe Espada was promoted to manager on November 13, 2023.

==== Los Angeles Angels ====
Playing under various names such as the Los Angeles Angels of Anaheim, the California Angels, the Anaheim Angels, and the Los Angeles Angels, the club has been a member of the American League since 1961. The team's first manager, Bill Rigney, led the squad for parts of eight seasons until his release in mid-1969. Mike Scioscia, who was manager for 19 seasons from 2000 through 2018, holds most of the Angels' managerial franchise records. He is the only Angels skipper to be named Manager of the Year, a distinction that he earned twice (2002, 2009). His regular-season wins (1066) and losses (878), postseason wins (21) and losses (24), and winning percentage (.548)^{[e]} are the highest of any manager in team history. Dick Williams is the only Angels manager who has been inducted into the Baseball Hall of Fame. Five managers have served multiple terms with the team: Gene Mauch, John McNamara, Buck Rodgers, Marcel Lachemann, and Joe Maddon. On October 21, 2018, Brad Ausmus was hired as the club's 21st manager after longtime manager Mike Scioscia stepped down. Ausmus was fired after one season. On October 16, 2019, the Angels announced that Joe Maddon would be returning to the team as manager. Maddon was fired on June 7, 2022, and was replaced by interim manager Phil Nevin. The Angels did not pick up the 2024 option for Nevin. On November 8, 2023, the Angels hired Braves third base coach and former Rangers manager Ron Washington to be the club's skipper. On June 20, 2025 the Angels announced that Washington will step away from managing due to health issues. Roy Montgomery will manage the remainder of the 2025 season. On September 30, 2025 the Angels announced that Washington will not resume his role as manager for the 2026 season, and Montgomery will not return as full time manager. Kurt Suzuki was named as the next manager on October 21, 2025.

==== Athletics ====
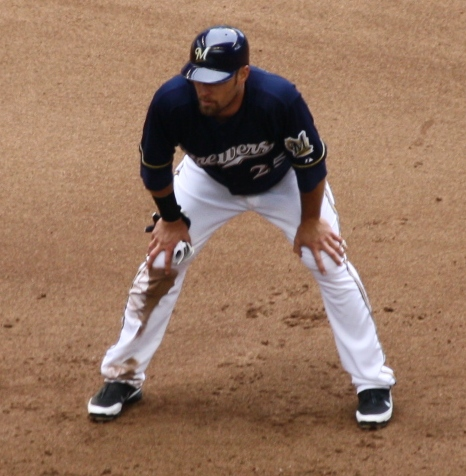
Mark Kotsay as a player for the Brewers

While the Oakland Athletics have played under the same name since their establishment in 1901, the team has played in three different locations. The franchise was initially based in Philadelphia, Pennsylvania and was managed by Connie Mack, a member of the Baseball Hall of Fame and often called one of the best managers in history. Mack led the team from 1901 to 1950; his 50 seasons managed are a Major League Baseball record which has been called "unbreakable". He managed 7,466 games, accruing a record of 3,582 wins and 3,814 losses; all three totals are also Major League Baseball records. Over the course of his career, Mack led the Athletics to nine American League pennants and five World Series championships. His 24 wins and 19 losses in the postseason are both franchise records. Three Athletics managers were inducted into the Philadelphia Baseball Wall of Fame in recognition of their services to the team while it played in Pennsylvania: Mack, Jimmy Dykes, and Eddie Joost. The team moved to Kansas City, Missouri in 1955, at the beginning of Lou Boudreau's tenure as manager, and then moved on to Oakland, California in 1968. Boudreau is also a member of the Hall of Fame, in addition to Mack; other inductees to manage the Athletics include Joe Gordon and Luke Appling, both inducted as players, and Dick Williams, whose .603 winning percentage leads all Athletics skippers. Bob Melvin managed from mid 2011 through 2021 as the team's 30th manager. He won Manager of the Year twice while in Oakland. After 2021 season, Melvin left the Athletics, to manage the Padres for 2022 season. On December 21, 2021, the Athletics named Mark Kotsay as their 31st manager in Athletics history.

==== Seattle Mariners ====
The Seattle Mariners franchise was established in 1977, the successor to the earlier Pilots team that moved to Milwaukee, Wisconsin. In their inaugural season, the Mariners hired Darrell Johnson as their first manager; he led the team for parts of four seasons, through the middle of 1980. After that point, no Mariners skipper started his new tenure at the beginning of the season until Jim Snyder in 1989. Statistically, Lou Piniella is the most successful manager in Mariners history; he is the franchise leader in games managed (1,551), regular-season wins and losses (840–711), and winning percentage (.542). He is also the first Mariners skipper to appear in the postseason, accruing a 15–19 record in 34 playoff games, and is the only person to win the Manager of the Year Award with the club, as he captured the award in 1995 and 2001. Don Wakamatsu, the first Asian-American manager in Major League Baseball history, was the team's skipper from 2009 until he was fired on August 9, 2010. Lloyd McClendon became the Mariners manager in late 2013, and managed the Mariners to a winning record in 2014. McClendon was fired October 9, 2015. On October 23, 2015, Scott Servais was hired as the club's 20th manager. Servais was fired on August 22, 2024. Former player Dan Wilson was hired as new manager on the same day.

==== Texas Rangers ====
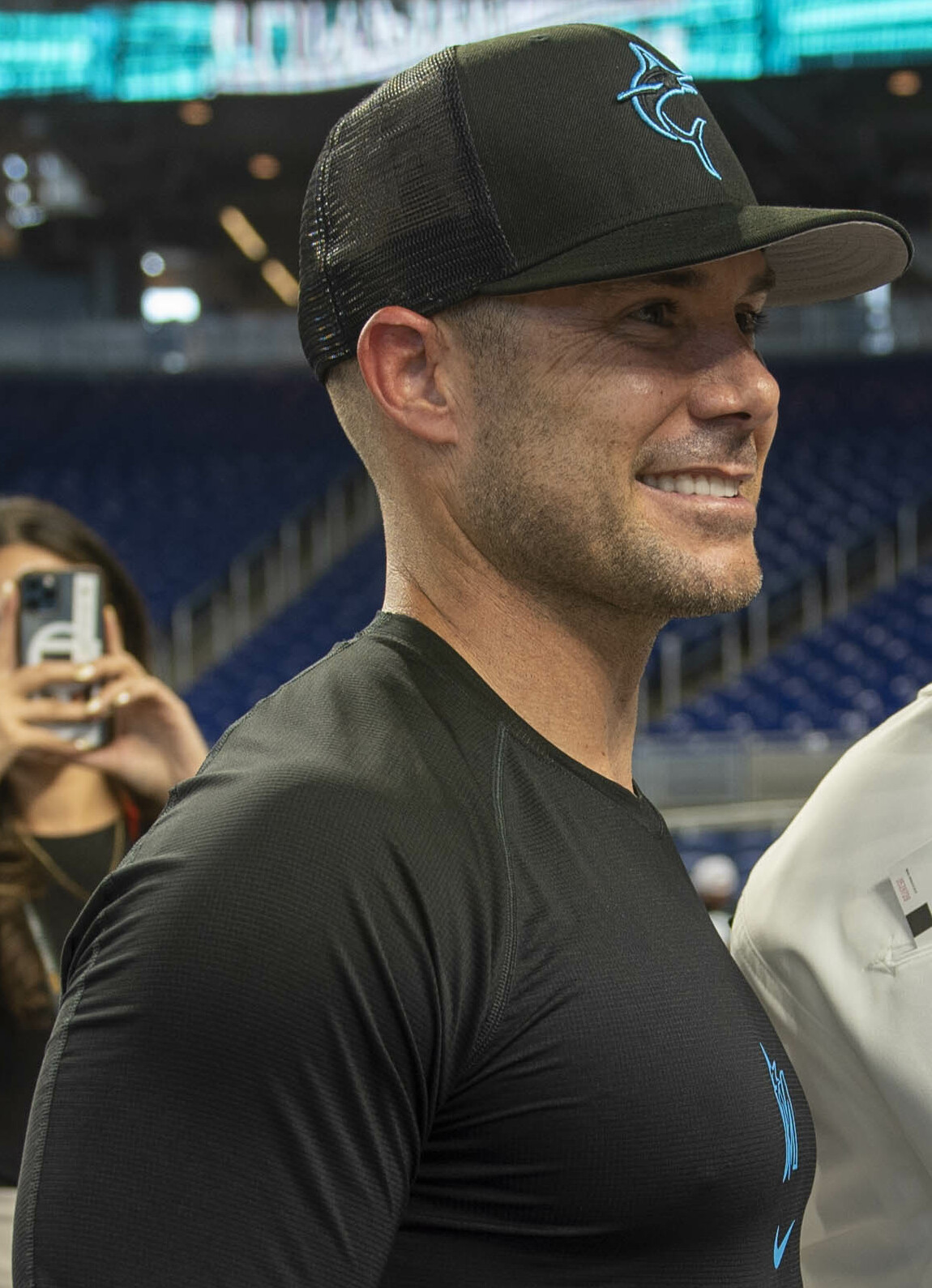
Schumaker with the Marlins

When the Minnesota Twins moved to Minneapolis for the 1961 season, a new Washington Senators team was established in the United States capital as an expansion franchise, with Mickey Vernon as manager. The new Senators played in Washington, D. C. for 11 seasons, finishing with a winning percentage over .500 only once—under Ted Williams in 1969. After the 1971 season, the team moved to Arlington, Texas and became the Texas Rangers, named after the Texas Ranger Division of the state's law enforcement agency. Bobby Valentine, who led the team for parts of eight seasons (1985–1992), is the franchise leader in managerial wins and losses in the regular season (581–605). Johnny Oates was the first Rangers manager to lead the team to the postseason; however, his playoff record is 1–9. Oates and Buck Showalter have won the Manager of the Year Award with the team. Among managers who have led the Rangers for a full season or more, Billy Hunter amassed the highest winning percentage (.575). Ron Washington led the Rangers since 2007, but he resigned in September 2014, to focus on his family. Tim Bogar then took over as interim manager. In October 2014, the Rangers named Jeff Banister as their new manager. He was fired late in the 2018 season and replaced by Don Wakamatsu for the remaining 10 games. On November 3, 2018, Chris Woodward was hired as the club's 27th manager. Woodward was fired on August 15, 2022. Tony Beasley managed the rest of 2022. On October 21, 2022, the Rangers hired Bruce Bochy as team's manager. The day after the 2025 season, the Rangers announced that Bochy will not return as manager for the 2026 season. Skip Schumaker was hired 4 days later.

== Notes ==
- ^{a} ^{b} ^{c} ^{d} ^{e} Among managers with 162 games (1 full season) or more managed.

== See also ==
- List of managers of defunct Major League Baseball teams
- List of Major League Baseball general managers
- List of Major League Baseball player-managers
- List of Major League Baseball managers with most career wins
