= Manager (baseball) =

Someone who manages a baseball team

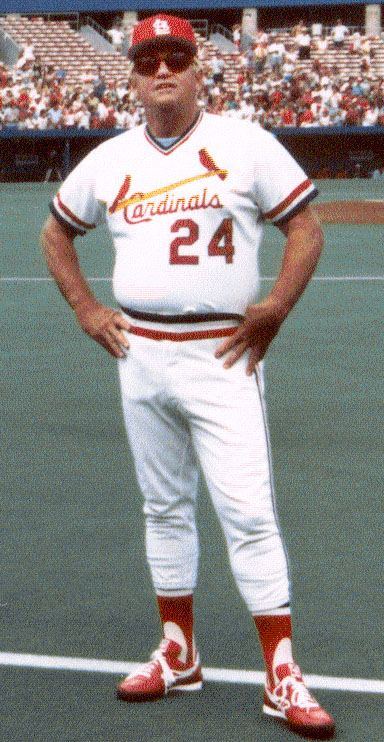
Whitey Herzog managed the St. Louis Cardinals in the 1980s

In baseball, the field manager (commonly referred to as the manager) is the equivalent of a head coach who is responsible for overseeing and making final decisions on all aspects of on-field team strategy, lineup selection, training and instruction. Managers are typically assisted by a staff of assistant coaches whose responsibilities are specialized. Field managers are typically not involved in off-field personnel decisions or long-term club planning, responsibilities that are instead held by a team's general manager.

== Duties ==
The manager chooses the batting order and starting pitcher before each game, and makes substitutions throughout the game – among the most significant being those decisions regarding when to bring in a relief pitcher. How much control a manager takes in a game's strategy varies from manager to manager and from game to game. Some managers control pitch selection, defensive positioning, decisions to bunt, steal, pitch out, etc., while others designate an assistant coach or a player (often the catcher) to make some or all of these decisions.

Some managers choose to act as their team's first base or third base coach while their team is batting in order to more closely communicate with baserunners, but most managers delegate this responsibility to an assistant. Managers are typically assisted by two or more coaches.

== In professional baseball ==
In many cases, a manager is a former professional, semi-professional or college player. From 1901 to 1981, 21% of MLB managers had played catcher during their playing career--the most common. Outfielders made up 16.6% and second basemen made up 13% of managers. Over the same period, managers who were second basemen had the highest winning percentage.

The manager's responsibilities normally are limited to in-game decisions, with off-field roster management and personnel decisions falling to the team's general manager. The term manager used without qualification almost always refers to the field manager (essentially equivalent to the head coach in other North American professional sports leagues), while the general manager is often called the GM. This usage dates back to the early days of professional baseball when it was common practice for teams to have just one "manager" on their staff, and where GM duties were performed either by the field manager or (more commonly) by the owner of the team. Some owners (most famously, Connie Mack of the Philadelphia Athletics) carried out both GM and field managerial duties themselves.

Major League Baseball managers differ from the head coaches of most other professional sports in that they dress in the same uniform as the players and are assigned a jersey number. The wearing of a matching uniform is frequently practiced at other levels of play, as well. The manager may be called "skipper" or "skip" informally by his players.

== Baseball Hall of Fame managers ==
There have been 24 people who have been elected to the National Baseball Hall of Fame and Museum primarily for their careers as managers. Of the 24 Hall of Fame managers, 20 were Major League players before becoming managers (the exceptions being Jim Leyland, Joe McCarthy, Frank Selee, and Earl Weaver). The most recent manager to be elected was Leyland, who was elected to the Hall of Fame by the Contemporary Baseball Era Committee in 2024.

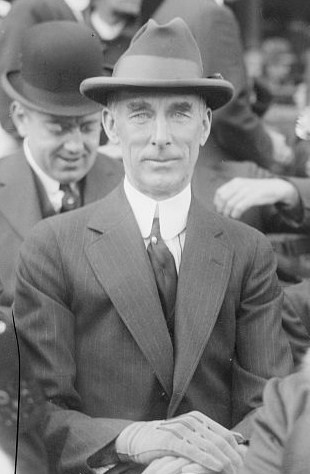
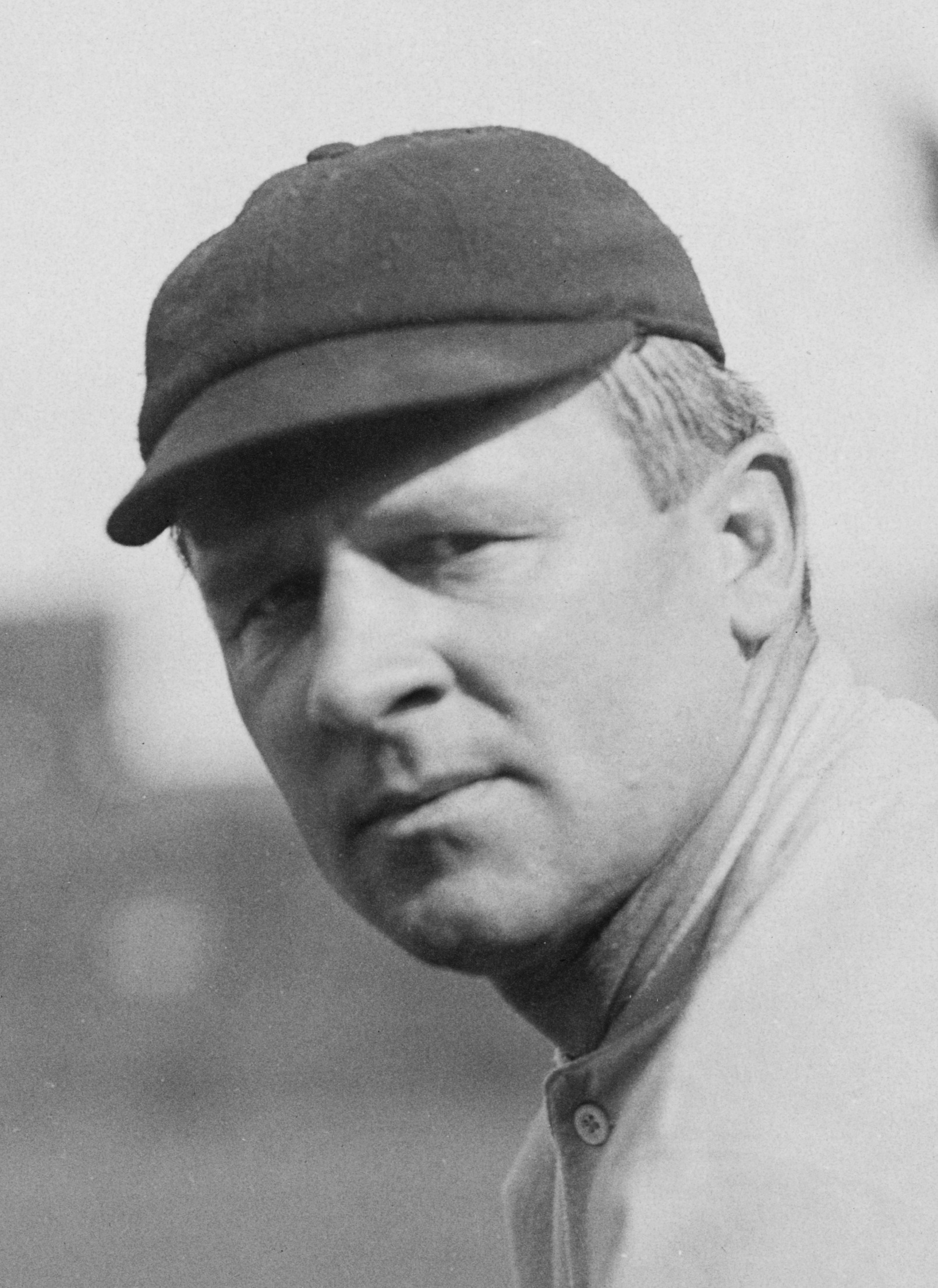
Connie Mack and John McGraw were the first managers to be elected to the Baseball Hall of Fame in 1937.
- Walter Alston
- George "Sparky" Anderson
- Bobby Cox
- Leo Durocher
- Andrew "Rube" Foster
- Edward "Ned" Hanlon
- Stanley "Bucky" Harris
- Dorrel "Whitey" Herzog
- Miller Huggins
- Tony La Russa
- Tommy Lasorda
- Jim Leyland
- Al López
- Connie Mack
- Joe McCarthy
- John McGraw
- Bill McKechnie
- Wilbert Robinson
- Frank Selee
- Billy Southworth
- Casey Stengel
- Joe Torre
- Earl Weaver
- Dick Williams

== See also ==
Related topics

- Player-manager (baseball)
- American Baseball Coaches Association

Awards

- Major League Baseball Manager of the Year Award
- Sporting News Manager of the Year Award
- Honor Rolls of Baseball § Managers

Lists

- List of Major League Baseball managers
- List of Major League Baseball managers with most career wins
- List of Major League Baseball player-managers
