= Sal Frelick =

American baseball player (born 2000)

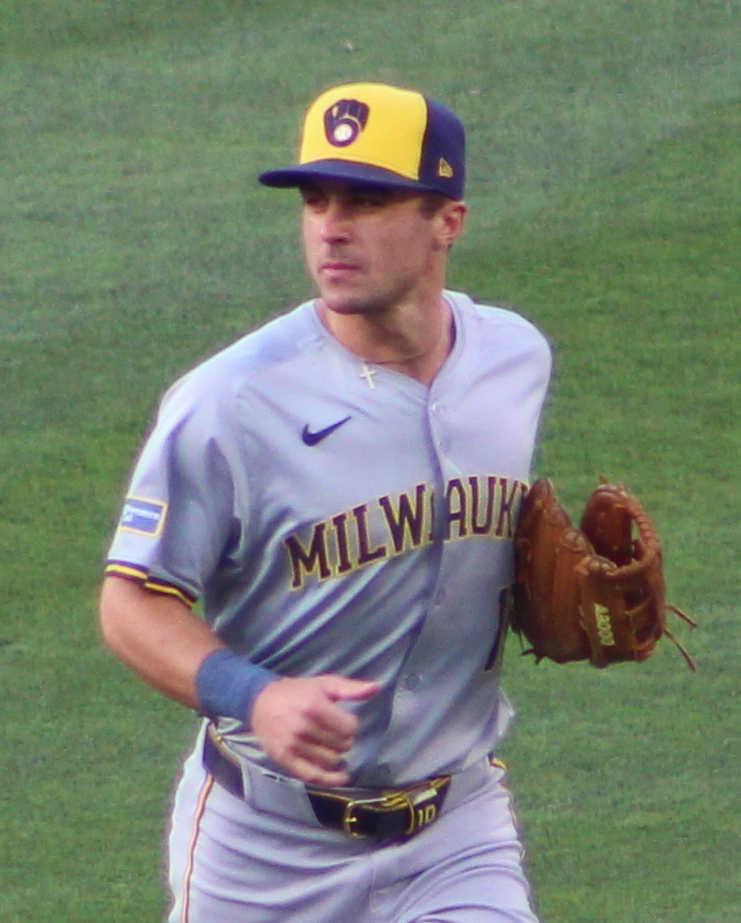
- Frelick with the Milwaukee Brewers in 2024

Milwaukee Brewers – No. 10
- Right fielder
- Born: April 19, 2000 (age 26); Boston, Massachusetts, U.S.
- Bats: Left Throws: Right

MLB debut
- July 22, 2023, for the Milwaukee Brewers

MLB statistics (through 2026 season)
- Batting average: .261
- Home runs: 21
- Runs batted in: 159
- Stats at Baseball Reference

Teams
- Milwaukee Brewers (2023–present)

Career highlights and awards
- World Series champion (2026); Gold Glove Award (2024)

Salvatore Michael Frelick (born April 19, 2000) is an American professional baseball right fielder for the Milwaukee Brewers of Major League Baseball (MLB). He made his MLB debut in 2023. He played college baseball for the Boston College Eagles. The Brewers took Frelick in the first round with the 15th overall selection of the 2021 Major League Baseball draft.

== Amateur career ==
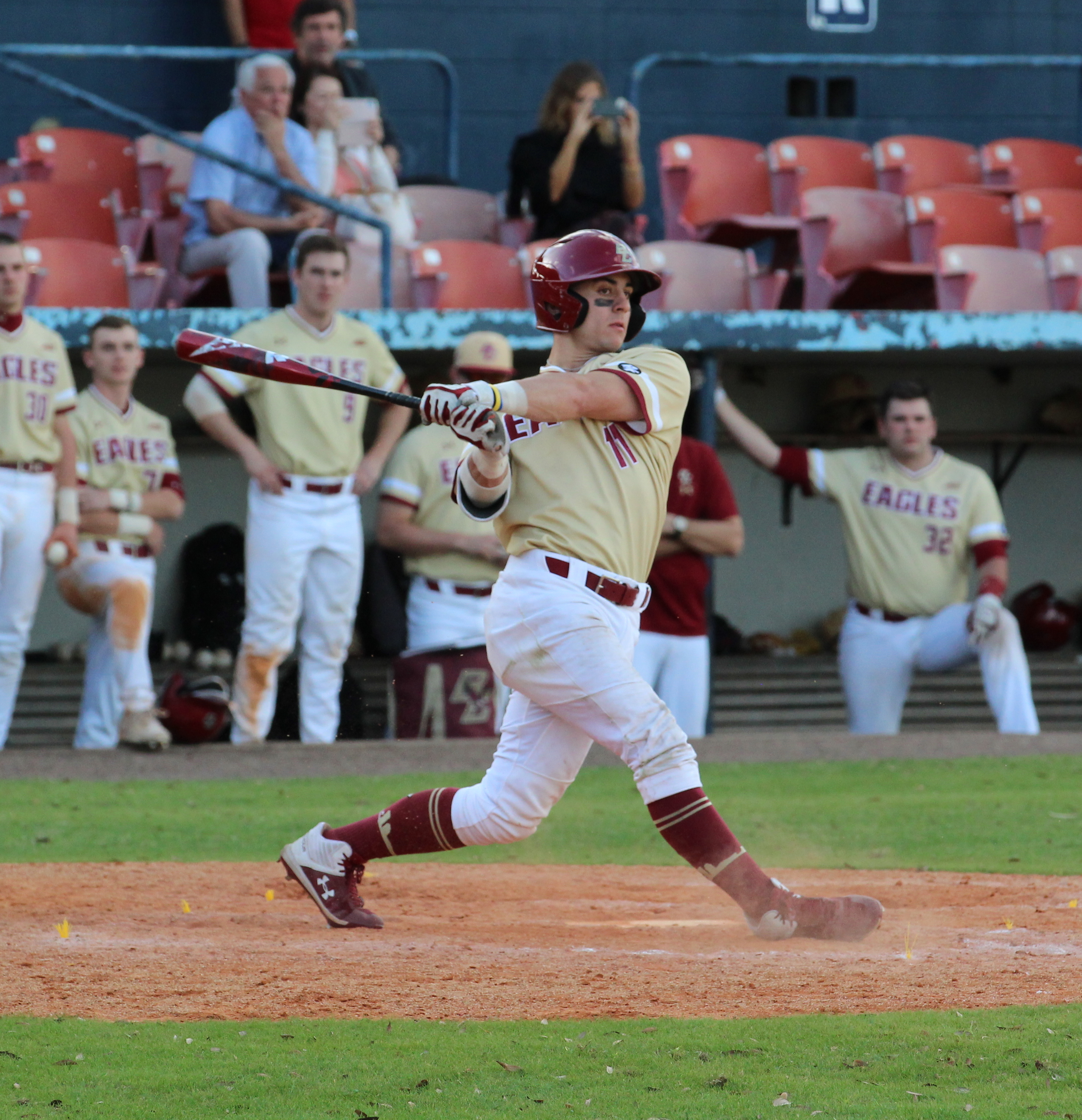
Frelick playing for Boston College in 2020

The son of Jeff and Patty Frelick, he grew up in Lexington, Massachusetts, with brother Nico and sister Francesca. He attended Lexington High School, where he played football, hockey and baseball. He was the starting quarterback at Lexington High and was named the Gatorade State Player of the Year as a senior after passing for 30 touchdowns. He committed to play college baseball at Boston College, where he was also offered a football scholarship. His father had played football for the University of Pittsburgh.

As a freshman at Boston College, Frelick was named Second Team All-Atlantic Coast Conference (ACC) and to the ACC All-Freshman Team after batting .367 with four home runs, 32 RBIs, 30 runs scored and 18 stolen bases. He batted .241 with 17 runs scored and seven stolen bases in 15 games before his sophomore season was cut short due to the coronavirus pandemic. As a junior, Frelick batted .359 with a .443 on base percentage, six home runs, 27 RBIs, and 17 doubles and was named first team All-ACC and the ACC Defensive Player of the Year.

== Professional career ==
Frelick during the 2026 postseason

The Milwaukee Brewers selected Frelick in the first round, with the 15th overall selection, of the 2021 Major League Baseball draft. He signed with the Brewers on July 20, 2021, for a $4 million signing bonus.

Frelick was assigned to the Rookie-level Arizona Complex League Brewers to start his professional career, where he had seven hits over 15 at bats with four runs scored, four RBIs, and three stolen bases in four games before being promoted to the Low-A Carolina Mudcats. He was promoted again to the High-A Wisconsin Timber Rattlers after batting .437 with 31 hits and one home run in 16 games played in Carolina. He ended the season with Wisconsin batting .167 over 15 games. Frelick began the 2022 season with Wisconsin, where he batted .291 in 21 games before being promoted to the Double-A Biloxi Shuckers. He batted .317 with five home runs, 25 RBIs, and 40 runs scored in 52 games with the Shuckers before being promoted a second time to the Triple-A Nashville Sounds.

Frelick began the 2023 season with Nashville. Following a shoulder injury to Garrett Mitchell, Frelick was expected to have a clearer path to make his Major League debut. But he suffered a thumb sprain shortly thereafter, and was ruled out for 6 to 8 weeks after undergoing surgery to repair the ulnar collateral ligament in his left thumb on April 25. Once he returned, he played in 40 games for Nashville, hitting .247/.333/.342 with 2 home runs, 18 RBI, and 8 stolen bases.

On July 22, 2023, Frelick was selected to the 40-man roster and promoted to the major leagues for the first time. Frelick made a sensational major-league debut that same day, to help Brewers beat the Atlanta Braves. On offense he hit safely in each of his first three at bats, including a run-scoring hit to tie the game in the sixth inning. Frelick made multiple acrobatic catches in right field on defense and drove in a run with a sacrifice fly in the bottom of the eighth. Frelick nailed his first career homer on July 24, with a game-tying blast to right field in the 6th inning off Cincinnati Reds starter Graham Ashcraft.

In 2024, he batted .259/.320/.335 with two home runs and 32 RBIs in 475 at-bats. His average exit velocity of 83.4, 18.5% hard hit ball rate, and .07% barrel percentage were the lowest in MLB, and his soft hit percentage was 23.8% the highest among all MLB batters. But Frelick was an exceptional defender in right field, leading all National League outfielders with 15 Defensive Runs Saved, and received the Gold Glove Award for his position.

Frelick would have his best season of his career in 2025, batting .288 with a .351 OBP and .405 slugging percentage, with 76 runs scored, 63 RBI's, 12 home runs, and 19 stolen bases; all career highs. The Brewers finished with a 97–65 record, the best in MLB, and won their third consecutive NL Central division title. In the 2025 NLDS, Frelick hit .235, his only big hit being an RBI double in game 3, which the Brewers lost. The Brewers would beat their division rivals, the Chicago Cubs, in 5 games to advance to the NLCS against the Los Angeles Dodgers, where the Brewers were swept in 4 games. Frelick would have only one hit in the four games, out of fourteen at-bats, for a .071 average.

Frelick during the 2026 World Series victory parade

Frelick would struggle with injury in 2026, suffering a strained shoulder and torn labrum in July, causing Frelick to miss over a month's worth of games. Frelick's injuries added to his hitting struggles, finishing with a .230 batting avg, 4 home runs, and 40 RBI's. The Brewers still finished with a 103–59 record, the best in franchise history, and won their 4th consecutive NL Central division title. In the 2026 NLDS against the San Diego Padres, Frelick hit .333 with 2 RBIs as the Brewers won the series 3–1, advancing to the NLCS in a rematch with the Dodgers. The Brewers would sweep the Dodgers in four games, winning their first-ever National League pennant and making their second World Series appearance in franchise history. Frelick didn't get any hits in six at-bats in the NLCS. In game 2 of the 2026 World Series against the Tampa Bay Rays, Frelick hit a clutch home run in the 6th inning to tie the game, which the Brewers ended up winning 5–4. Frelick's home run was the first World Series home run for the Brewers since 1982, with Ben Oglivie's home run in game 7.

== International career ==
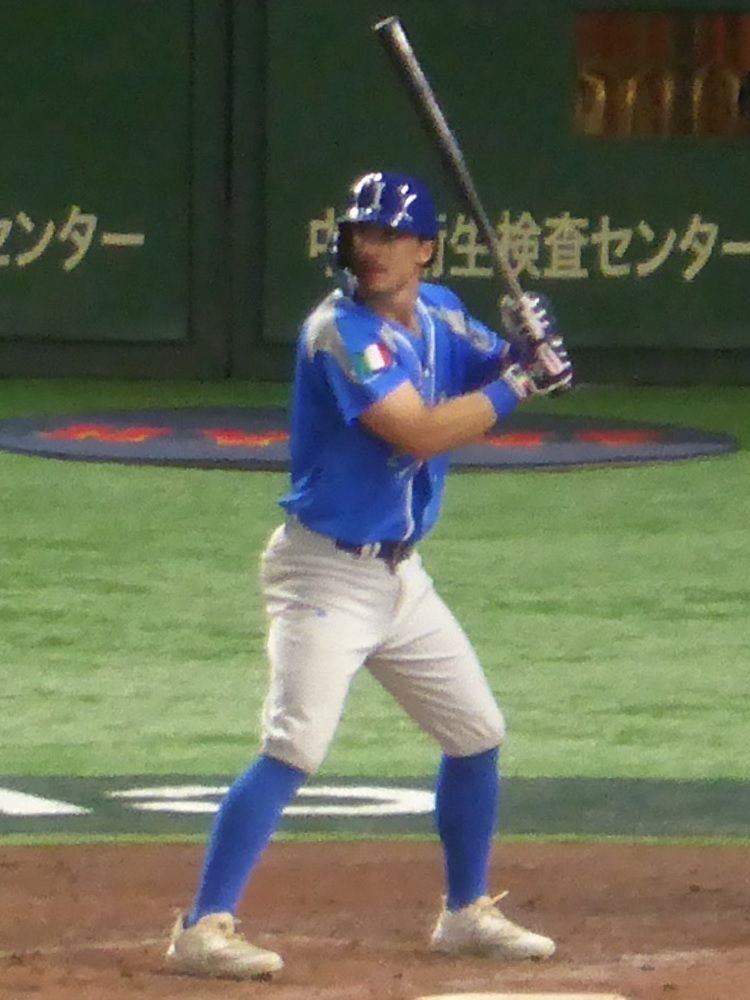
Frelick with the WBC Italy national team at Tokyo Dome on March 16, 2023

Frelick played for the Italy national baseball team at the 2023 World Baseball Classic.
