= Cooper Pratt =

American baseball player (born 2004)

- Pratt with the Milwaukee Brewers in 2026

Milwaukee Brewers – No. 12
- Shortstop
- Born: August 18, 2004 (age 22); Hialeah, Florida, U.S.
- Bats: Right Throws: Right

MLB debut
- June 16, 2026, for the Milwaukee Brewers

MLB statistics (through 2026 season)
- Batting average: .281
- Home runs: 3
- Runs batted in: 34
- Stats at Baseball Reference

Teams
- Milwaukee Brewers (2026–present)

Career highlights and awards
- World Series champion (2026)

Cooper Wickham Pratt (born August 18, 2004) is an American professional baseball shortstop for the Milwaukee Brewers of Major League Baseball (MLB). He made his MLB debut in 2026.

== Early life ==
Pratt was born on August 18, 2004, in Hialeah, Florida, and was raised in Oxford, Mississippi.

Pratt attended Magnolia Heights School, Senatobia in Senatobia, Mississippi. As a senior in 2023, he was the Mississippi Gatorade Baseball Player of the Year after hitting .469 with four home runs, 50 runs batted in (RBI), and 38 stolen bases on offense and a 10–0 record with a 0.14 earned run average (ERA) and 66 strikeouts.

He committed to play college baseball for the Ole Miss Rebels.

== Professional career ==
Pratt playing with the Biloxi Shuckers in 2025

The Milwaukee Brewers selected Pratt in the sixth round of the 2023 Major League Baseball draft. He signed with the Brewers and made his professional debut with the Arizona Complex League Brewers, hitting .356 over 12 games. He played the 2024 season with the Carolina Mudcats and Wisconsin Timber Rattlers, hitting .277 with eight home runs, 45 RBI, and 27 stolen bases over 96 games. Pratt was assigned to the Biloxi Shuckers for the 2025 season and slashed .238/.343/.348. At the end of the year, the Milwaukee Journal Sentinel listed him as the Brewers' number two prospect.

The Brewers assigned Pratt to the Nashville Sounds to begin the 2026 season. On April 3, Pratt and the Brewers finalized an eight-year, $50.75 million contract extension and the team added him to their 40-man roster. The contract has two club options for 2034 and 2035 that would push the contract's value to over $80 million if picked up. At the time of the contract's signing, Baseball America ranked Pratt as the 53rd-best prospect in MLB; other outlets ranked him lower. He had the least amount of upper-level professional experience—three games at the Triple-A level or higher—of any MLB player who had ever signed a contract extension. The Brewers promoted Pratt to the major leagues for the first time on June 16, 2026.

In the 2026 World Series, in which the Brewers won their first-ever championship in five games over the Tampa Bay Rays, Pratt batted 8-for-19 with one home run and seven RBIs, including six hits in six consecutive at bats between games four and five—something no rookie had ever done in the World Series before.

In the 12th inning of Game 4 of the 2026 World Series, Pratt hit a solo home run off Ian Seymour for the Brewers to break a tie and put the team in the lead at 3–2, three outs away from a sweep. However, the Rays scored two runs in the bottom of the 12th to take the game and force a fifth game. In the same game, Pratt became the sixth-ever under-23 player to record four hits in a World Series game, one day after teammate Jackson Chourio accomplished the feat.

== Personal life ==
Pratt is a member of the Church of Jesus Christ of Latter-day Saints (LDS Church). His uncle, Trent Pratt, is the head baseball coach at Brigham Young University.

Pratt during the victory parade for the 2026 World Series, holding a can of Fanta (which he opted for, due to his religious abstention from alcohol consumption)

As an LDS Church member, Pratt doesn't consume alcohol, and became notable for celebrating major wins during his rookie season with orange sodas like Fanta and Jarritos, alongside his teammates who were popping champagne.
