= Willson Contreras =

Venezuelan baseball player (born 1992)

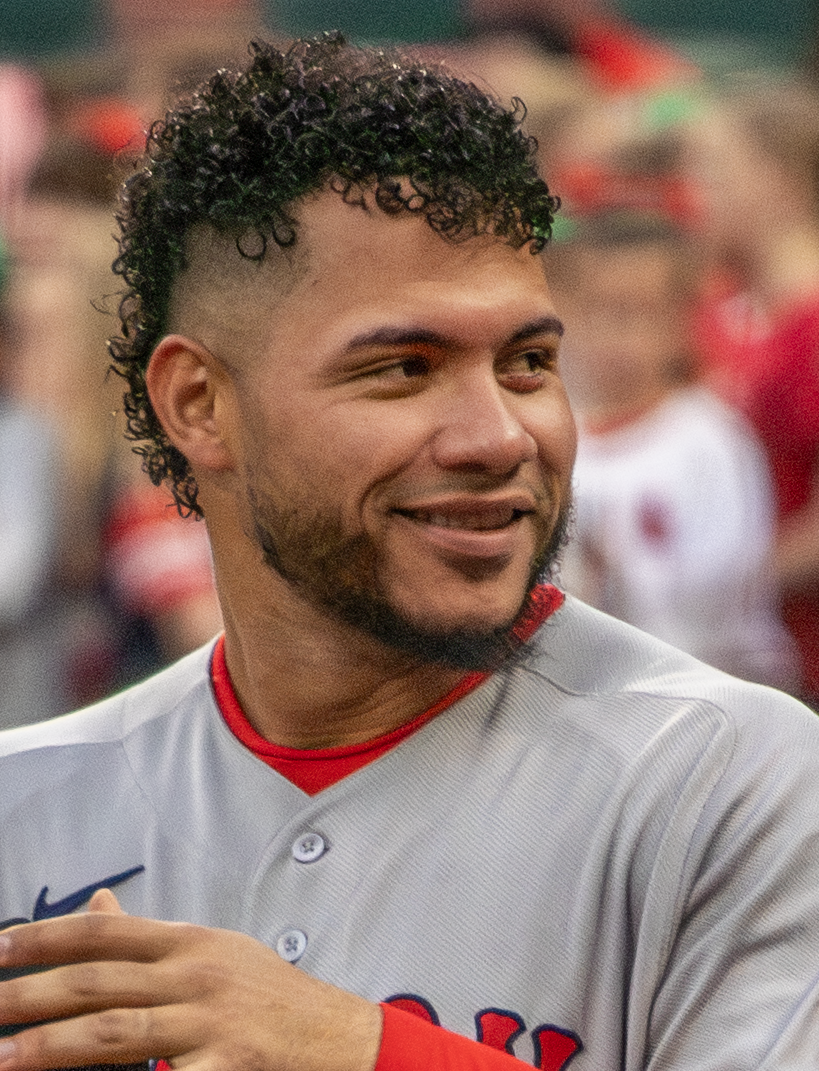
- Contreras with the Boston Red Sox in 2026

Boston Red Sox – No. 40
- First baseman / Catcher
- Born: May 13, 1992 (age 34); Puerto Cabello, Carabobo, Venezuela
- Bats: Right Throws: Right

MLB debut
- June 17, 2016, for the Chicago Cubs

MLB statistics (through 2026 season)
- Batting average: .260
- Hits: 1,077
- Home runs: 199
- Runs batted in: 629
- Stats at Baseball Reference

Teams
- Chicago Cubs (2016–2022); St. Louis Cardinals (2023–2025); Boston Red Sox (2026–present)

Career highlights and awards
- 4× All-Star (2018, 2019, 2022, 2026); World Series champion (2016)
Medals
Men's baseball
Representing Venezuela
World Baseball Classic
Gold medal – first place	2026 Miami	Team

Willson Eduardo Contreras (born May 13, 1992) is a Venezuelan professional baseball first baseman and catcher for the Boston Red Sox of Major League Baseball (MLB). He has previously played in MLB for the Chicago Cubs and St. Louis Cardinals.

Contreras made his MLB debut in 2016 and was a member of the 2016 World Series champions. Contreras was voted as a starter in the MLB All-Star Game in 2018, 2019, and 2022. He signed with the Cardinals as a free agent after the 2022 season. In December 2025, Contreras was traded to the Red Sox.

== Early life ==
Contreras was born on May 13, 1992, in Puerto Cabello, Venezuela, to Olga and William Contreras. He is the middle child of three, with an older brother, Willmer, and a younger brother, William. Willson and William would play baseball in the street as children by using a crumpled piece of paper as a ball. At the age of 16, Contreras began attending a baseball academy in Venezuela run by the Chicago Cubs of Major League Baseball (MLB).

== Career ==
=== Minor leagues ===
Contreras signed with the Chicago Cubs as an international free agent in 2009. He made his professional debut with the Dominican Summer League Cubs that year. He batted .205 in 29 games at age 17. In 2010, he batted .313 in 17 games at age 18 with them. In 2011 and 2012 he played with the Boise Hawks. Contreras spent 2013 with the Kane County Cougars, 2014 with the Daytona Cubs, and 2015 with the Tennessee Smokies. He was named the Cubs Minor League Player of the Year in 2015 after batting .333/.413/.478 with eight home runs. During his minor league career, he played the positions of catcher, first base, second base, third base, left field, and right field. The Cubs added him to their 40-man roster after the season.

Contreras was rated 57th on Baseball Prospectus' top 101 prospect list prior to the 2016 season.

=== Chicago Cubs (2016–2022) ===
==== 2016–2017 ====
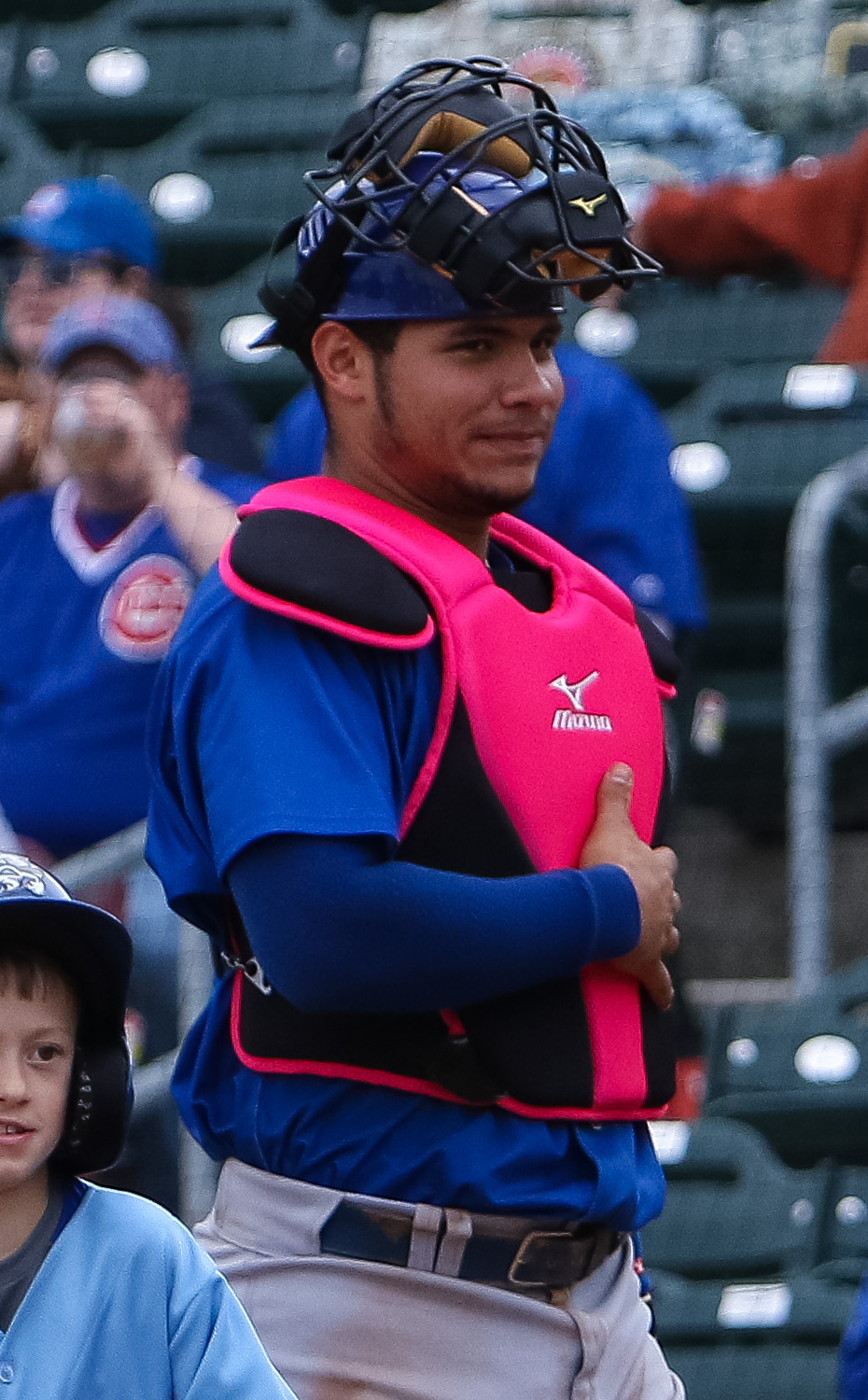
Contreras with the Chicago Cubs

The Cubs promoted Contreras to the major league team on June 17, 2016. On June 19, he hit a two-run home run on the first pitch of his first major-league at-bat after two pick-off attempts by A. J. Schugel to first base, becoming the 30th player in the modern MLB era to do so. In his fifth game, he started at the first base position, and started in left field in his eighth game, establishing himself as a versatile player on the field. Contreras finished the 2016 regular season with 80 hits in 295 at-bats with 12 home runs, 35 RBIs and a .275 batting average.

In Game 4 of the 2016 National League Division Series against the San Francisco Giants with the Cubs having a 2–1 series lead, Contreras had a pinch-hit two-run single in the top of the ninth inning, tying the score at five. Contreras was forced at second by a Jason Heyward bunt but the Cubs scored the go-ahead run later that inning, sending them to the National League Championship Series. The Cubs won the 2016 World Series over the Cleveland Indians, giving the Cubs their first championship in 108 years. Contreras drove in a run with a double in the seventh game.

On April 2, 2017, Contreras was the Cubs' opening day starting catcher against the St. Louis Cardinals. After hitting five home runs in six games, he was selected as the National League's Player of the Week on August 8. On August 9, Contreras suffered a moderate hamstring strain while running to first base against the San Francisco Giants. At the time of the injury he was batting .274 with 93 hits in 339 at bats, hit 21 home runs and had 70 RBIs. Willson returned from the injury on September 10 as a pinch hitter. On September 15, 2017, Contreras was ejected and suspended one game for throwing his mask, which bounced and hit umpire Jordan Baker in the shins. In 377 at-bats, Contreras finished the season with a .276 batting average, 104 hits, 21 home runs, five stolen bases and 74 RBIs.

On October 18, 2017, in Game Four of the NLCS, Contreras hit the longest postseason home run, at 491 feet (150 m), since Statcast started recording such data in 2015.

==== 2018–2022 ====
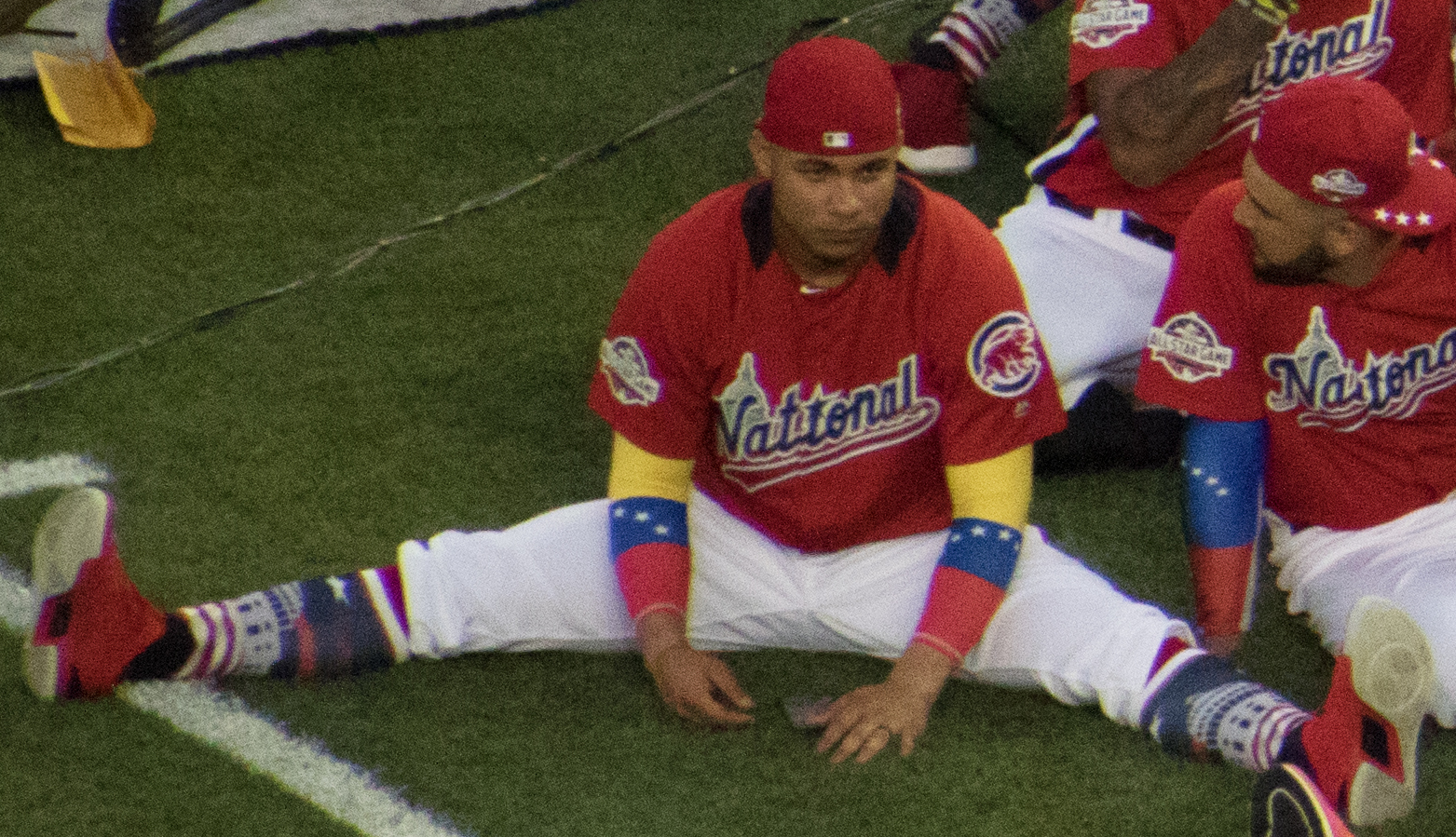
Contreras at the 2018 MLB Home Run Derby

Batting .287 with seven home runs and 34 RBIs, Contreras was voted to start in the 2018 All-Star Game, his first All-Star appearance. He finished his 2018 campaign batting .249 with ten home runs and 54 RBIs in 138 games.

Contreras had a fast start to the 2019 season, batting .315 with an on-base plus slugging percentage of 1.069 into mid-May. On May 11, he had his first career walk-off hit, a solo shot off the Milwaukee Brewers' Burch Smith, ending a 15-inning marathon. Contreras and teammate Javier Baez were named starters for the National League in the 2019 All-Star game, but neither registered a hit. On August 3, Contreras strained his hamstring running to first base and was put on the 10-day injured list. He finished the 2019 season slashing .272/.355/.533 with 24 home runs and 64 RBIs over 105 games.

In the shortened 60-game season in 2020, Contreras played in 57 games with a batting line of .243/.356/.407 to go along with seven home runs and 26 RBI.

In 2021, Contreras slashed .237/.340/.438 with 21 home runs and 57 RBIs in 128 games. He also caught the first combined no-hitter in Cubs history against the Los Angeles Dodgers on June 24.

On May 16, 2022, Contreras hit a grand slam off of Pittsburgh Pirates starter Bryse Wilson, with the blast marking his 100th career home run. In 2022, Contreras put up a slash of .243/.349/.466 alongside 55 RBIs and 22 home runs. He was selected to participate in the 2022 MLB All Star Game alongside his brother, William Contreras, becoming just the fifth pair of brothers to play in the same All Star Game in baseball history.

=== St. Louis Cardinals (2023–2025) ===
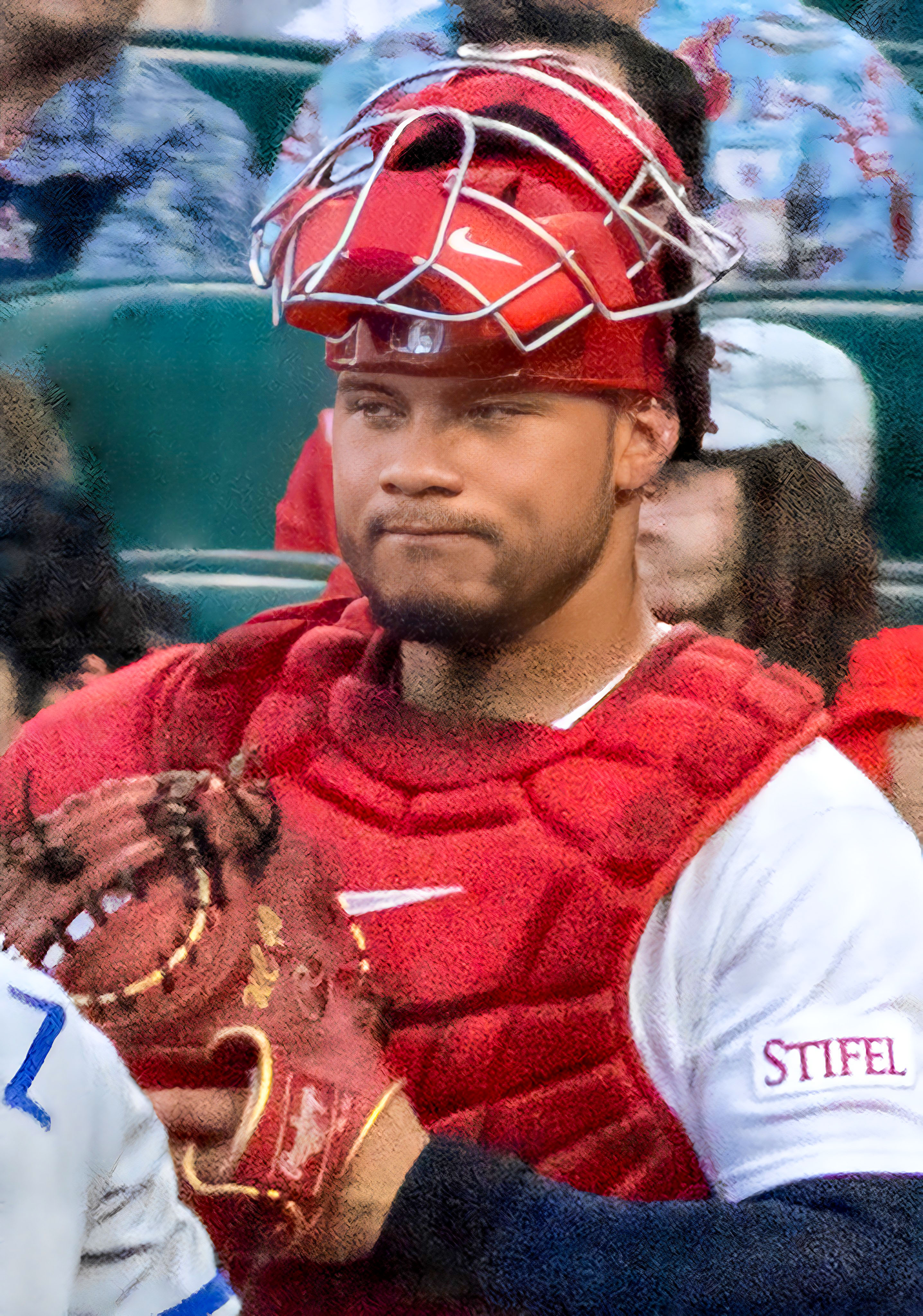
Contreras in 2023

On December 9, 2022, Contreras signed a five-year, $87.5 million contract with the St. Louis Cardinals. On May 6, 2023, the Cardinals announced that Contreras would begin to see less time at catcher and more time at designated hitter and in the outfield. The decision was made at the request of the Cardinals' starting pitchers who attributed their poor performance to Contreras and told management that they no longer wanted to pitch to him. He returned to catching duties on May 15, when he was the starting catcher in a Jack Flaherty start against the Milwaukee Brewers. Contreras finished the season with a .264 batting average, 20 home runs and 67 RBIs in 125 games.

==== 2024 season ====
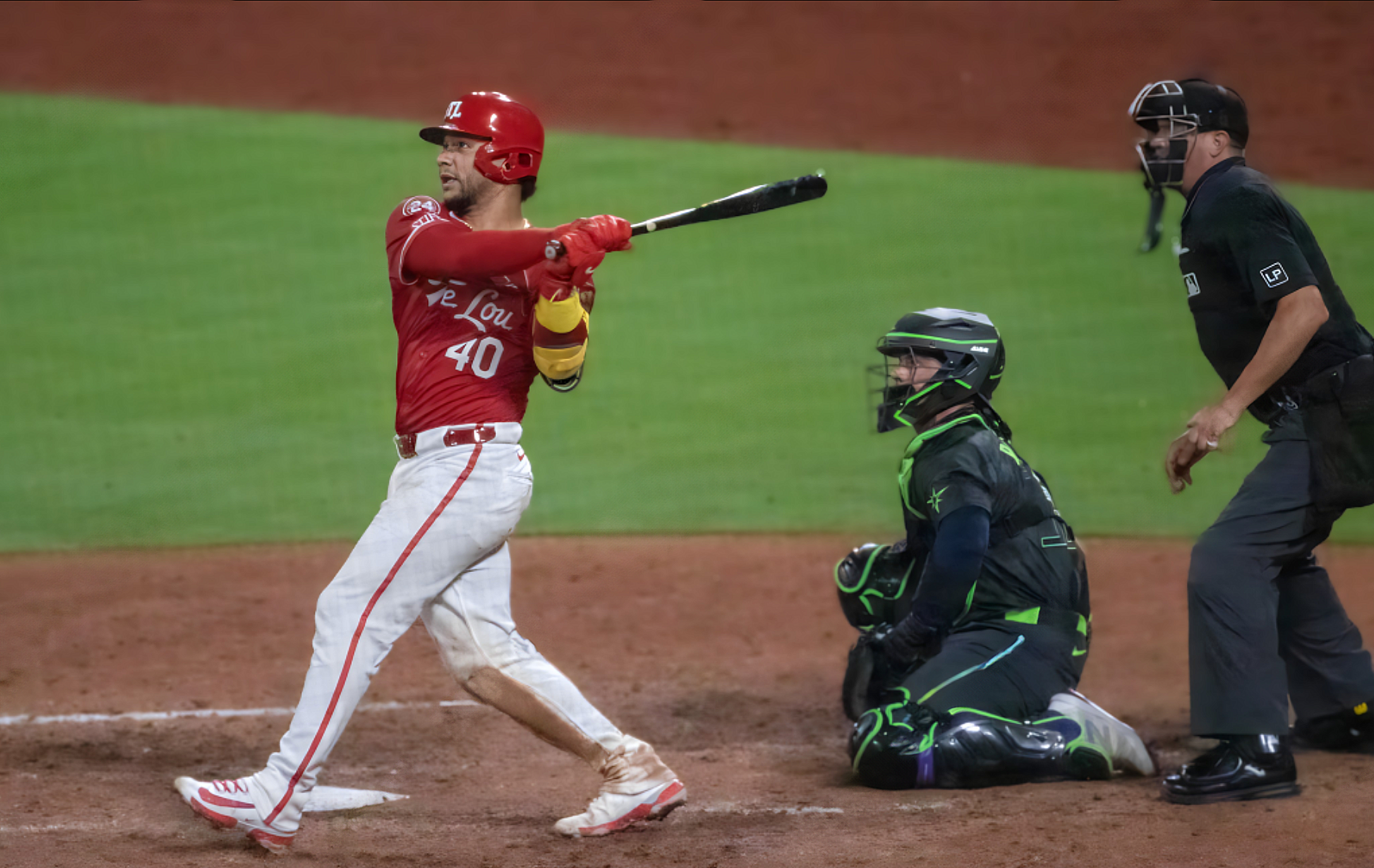
Contreras in 2024

On May 7, 2024, Contreras' left forearm was fractured during a game when he was hit by a swing by New York Mets outfielder J. D. Martinez. Contreras told reporters he would need surgery and would miss at least six weeks. In 84 games for St. Louis in 2024, he slashed .262/.380/.468 with 15 home runs and 36 RBI. Following the season, president of baseball operations John Mozeliak announced that Contreras would be moving to first base on a permanent basis.

==== 2025 season ====
Contreras played his 1,000th career game on June 5, 2025, against the Kansas City Royals, when he hit a game-winning single to bring Lars Nootbaar for the winning run to defeat the Royals 6–5 in extra innings. It was the third career walk-off hit of his career and his first as a Cardinal; he also recorded the 500th RBI of his career. Contreras made 135 appearances for St. Louis, slashing .257/.344/.447 with 20 home runs and 80 RBI. On September 17, Contreras was placed on the injured list due to a right shoulder strain, ending his season.

=== Boston Red Sox (2026–present) ===
On December 21, 2025, Contreras was traded to the Boston Red Sox in exchange for Hunter Dobbins and minor league prospects Yhoiker Fajardo and Blake Aita. On June 30, Contreras became the first player in Red Sox history to be ejected in back-to-back games, following a confrontation with Washington Nationals pitcher Cade Cavalli. On July 7, Contreras was named to his fourth all-star game as a reserve for the American League. He replaced Vladimir Guerrero Jr., who was recovering from a lower back injury.

== Personal life ==
Contreras wearing his brother's jersey at Tropicana Field following his brother's victory in the 2026 World Series

Contreras' younger brother, William Contreras, is also a catcher in MLB. Contreras married Andrea Villamizar on May 3, 2018.

== See also ==
- List of Major League Baseball players with a home run in their first major league at bat
- List of Major League Baseball players from Venezuela
