= Nick Martinez (baseball) =

American baseball player (born 1990)

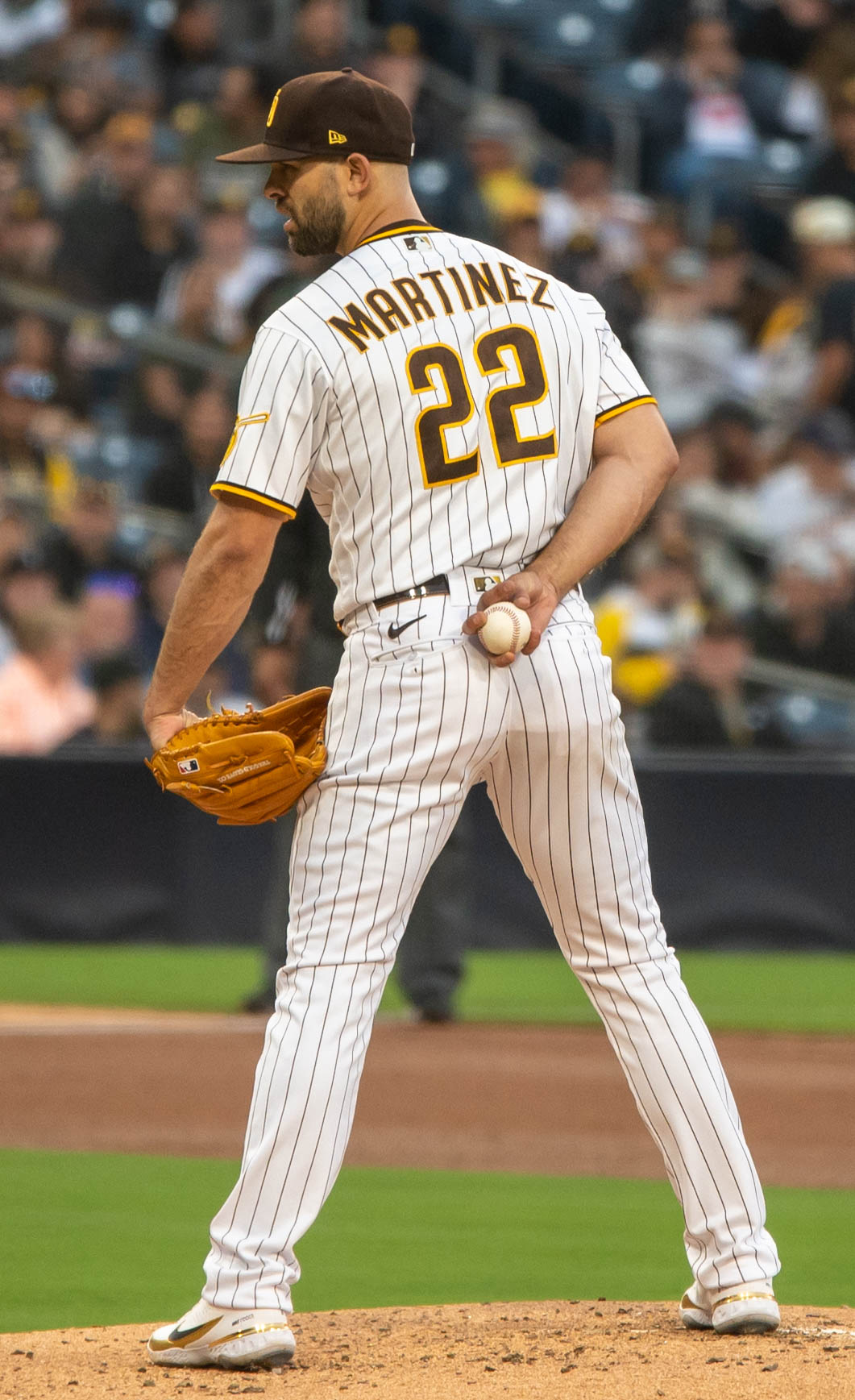
- Martinez with the Padres in 2022

Free agent
- Pitcher
- Born: August 5, 1990 (age 36); Miami, Florida, U.S.
- Bats: Left Throws: Right

Professional debut
- MLB: April 5, 2014, for the Texas Rangers
- NPB: March 31, 2018, for the Hokkaido Nippon-Ham Fighters

MLB statistics (through 2026 season)
- Win–loss record: 63–65
- Earned run average: 3.99
- Strikeouts: 779

NPB statistics (through 2021 season)
- Win–loss record: 21–22
- Earned run average: 3.02
- Strikeouts: 297
- Stats at Baseball Reference

Teams
- Texas Rangers (2014–2017); Hokkaido Nippon-Ham Fighters (2018–2020); Fukuoka SoftBank Hawks (2021); San Diego Padres (2022–2023); Cincinnati Reds (2024–2025); Tampa Bay Rays (2026)

Career highlights and awards
- All-Star (2026)
Medals
Men's baseball
Representing United States
Olympic Games
Silver medal – second place	2020 Tokyo	Team
World Baseball Classic
Silver medal – second place	2023 Miami	Team

Nicholas Andres Martinez (born August 5, 1990) is an American professional baseball pitcher who is a free agent. He has played in Major League Baseball (MLB) for the Texas Rangers, San Diego Padres, Cincinnati Reds, Tampa Bay Rays and in Nippon Professional Baseball (NPB) for the Hokkaido Nippon-Ham Fighters and Fukuoka SoftBank Hawks. Martinez was named to his first All-Star game in 2026.

== Amateur career ==
Martinez graduated from Belen Jesuit Preparatory School in Miami, Florida. He enrolled at Fordham University, where he played college baseball for the Fordham Rams. He had a 1–3 win–loss record with a 5.33 earned run average (ERA) in 15 games, over two seasons for Fordham as a relief pitcher. He was mostly a second baseman, batting .295 with 4 home runs, 66 runs batted in, 167 hits, and 22 stolen bases over three seasons and 148 games. In 2011, he played collegiate summer baseball with the Falmouth Commodores of the Cape Cod Baseball League. He also played in the New England Collegiate Baseball League for the Vermont Mountaineers. He is the seventh Mountaineer to make it to the MLB.

== Professional career ==
=== Texas Rangers ===
The Texas Rangers selected Martinez in the 18th round of the 2011 Major League Baseball draft. He made his professional debut with the Arizona League Rangers, and also appeared for the Low-A Spokane Indians, posting a cumulative 2.75 ERA across 10 contests. The next year, Martinez played for the Single-A Hickory Crawdads, pitching to a 8–6 record and 4.83 ERA across 31 appearances. Martinez split the 2013 season between the High-A Myrtle Beach Pelicans and the Double-A Frisco RoughRiders, logging a 12–7 record and 2.50 ERA with 128 strikeouts in 151 1/3 innings of work.

Martinez was named the Rangers' fifth starter on March 26, 2014. He was selected to the 40-man roster on April 5 and promoted to the major leagues for the first time. In his first career start against the Tampa Bay Rays, Martinez went six innings, struck out three and allowed three earned runs on four hits. He received a no decision as the Rangers lost 5–4. After two straight starts against the Oakland Athletics, the Rangers got Matt Harrison back from the DL and moved Martinez to the bullpen. Martinez went 6 2/3 innings, struck out six and allowed only one earned run in four relief appearances. In a game against the Houston Astros, Harrison injured his lower back and had spinal fusion surgery. The Rangers then put Martinez back into the starting rotation. Martinez finished his rookie season with a 5–12 record and 4.55 ERA in 29 major league contests. In 2015, Martinez posted an ERA of 3.96 and shared the major league lead in hit batsmen, with 13. In 2016, Martinez split the year between the Triple-A Round Rock Express and Texas, recording a 2–3 record and 5.59 ERA in 12 big league games.

In 2017, Martinez pitched to a 3–8 record and 5.66 ERA with 67 strikeouts in 111 1/3 innings of work for Texas. On December 1, 2017, Martinez was non-tendered by the Rangers, making him a free agent.

=== Hokkaido Nippon-Ham Fighters ===
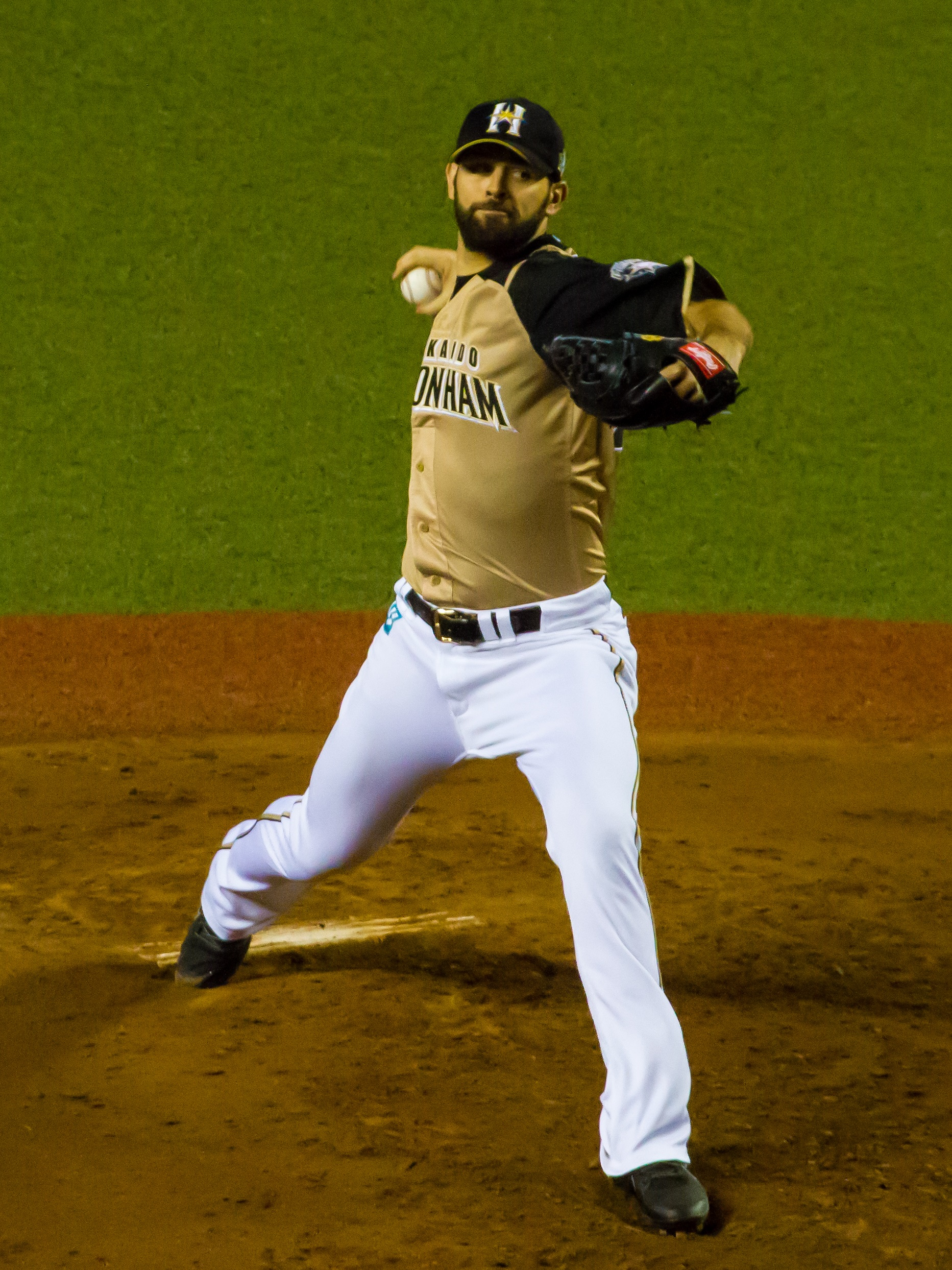
Martinez with the Fighters in 2018

Upon reaching free agency and limited interest from MLB teams, Martinez signed a one-year, $1.8 million contract with the Hokkaido Nippon-Ham Fighters of Nippon Professional Baseball (NPB) on January 6, 2018. According to reports, the contract included possible incentives based on innings pitched.

In his first NPB season, Martinez went 10–11 with 93 strikeouts and an ERA of 3.51. On December 18, 2018, Martinez re-signed with the team on a one-year, $2.2 million contract. In 2019, Martinez pitched four innings. On October 18, 2019, Martinez signed a 1-year extension to remain with the Fighters. In 2020, Martinez made 17 appearances for the Fighters, logging a 2–7 record and 4.62 ERA. On December 2, 2020, he became a free agent.

=== Fukuoka SoftBank Hawks ===
On January 30, 2021, Martinez signed with the Fukuoka SoftBank Hawks of Nippon Professional Baseball. In 21 appearances for the Hawks during the season, Martinez compiled a 9–4 record and 1.60 ERA with 138 strikeouts across 140 2/3 innings pitched.

=== San Diego Padres ===
On March 19, 2022, Martinez signed a one-year, major league contract with the San Diego Padres. He made 47 appearances (10 starts) for San Diego, compiling a 4–4 record and 3.47 ERA with 95 strikeouts and eight saves across 106 1/3 innings pitched. On November 10, Martinez opted out of his contract.

On November 22, 2022, Martinez signed a three-year, $26 million contract to return to the Padres. He made 63 appearances (nine starts) for the Padres in 2023, posting a 6–4 record and 3.43 ERA with 106 strikeouts and one save over 110 1/3 innings of work. On November 4, 2023, Martinez declined his player option for the 2024 season and became a free agent.

=== Cincinnati Reds ===
On December 1, 2023, Martinez signed a two-year, $26 million contract with the Cincinnati Reds. He made 42 appearances (16 starts) for Cincinnati in 2024, logging a 10–7 record and 3.10 ERA with 116 strikeouts across 142 1/3 innings pitched. Martinez declined his 2025 option on November 1, 2024, and became a free agent. However, on November 4, the Reds offered Martinez a qualifying offer, in which he accepted it on November 17, to remain with the team on a one-year contract.

On June 27, 2025, Martinez fell 3 outs short of throwing a no-hitter against the San Diego Padres. After walking Trenton Brooks to lead off the 9th, pinch hitter Elias Diaz hit a double off the wall, ending the no-hit bid and Martinez's night. His 112 pitches tied a career high during his quest to throw the first Reds no-hitter since Wade Miley in 2021. Martinez made 40 appearances (including 26 starts) for Cincinnati during the regular season, compiling an 11-14 record and 4.45 ERA with 116 strikeouts across 165 2/3 innings pitched.

=== Tampa Bay Rays ===
On February 10, 2026, Martinez signed a one-year, $13 million contract with the Tampa Bay Rays.

On July 10, Nick Martinez was named to the American League All Star Team, replacing Boston Red Sox starter Ranger Suarez.

On August 11, Martinez pitched his first 9-inning complete game, logging 101 pitches, in a 12–4 win against the Athletics.

Martinez was named the Game 1 starter for the Rays in the 2026 World Series against the Milwaukee Brewers. He gave up two earned runs in the top of the first inning on RBI hits by Christian Yelich and William Contreras, but settled in and pitched five innings without allowing any more earned runs, striking out five and walking none. He was charged with the loss, as Tampa Bay lost 3–2. On October 29, after the Rays lost the World Series the day prior, Martinez declined his end of his mutual option and became a free agent.

== International career ==
On July 2, 2021, Martinez was named to the roster for the United States national baseball team for the 2020 Summer Olympics, contested in 2021 in Tokyo. For the entire tournament, Martinez made two starts, totaling 11 innings with 16 strikeouts, surrendering just two runs. Martinez started for the United States in the gold medal game against Japan, allowing one run on five hits with seven strikeouts over six innings of work. However, he was credited with the loss as the US fell to Japan in a shutout; the team went on to win silver.

== See also ==
- List of Olympic medalists in baseball
- List of World Series starting pitchers

Awards and achievements
Preceded by Blake Snell	National League Pitcher of the Month; September 2024	Succeeded by Yoshinobu Yamamoto
