= Jeff Levering =

American sportscaster

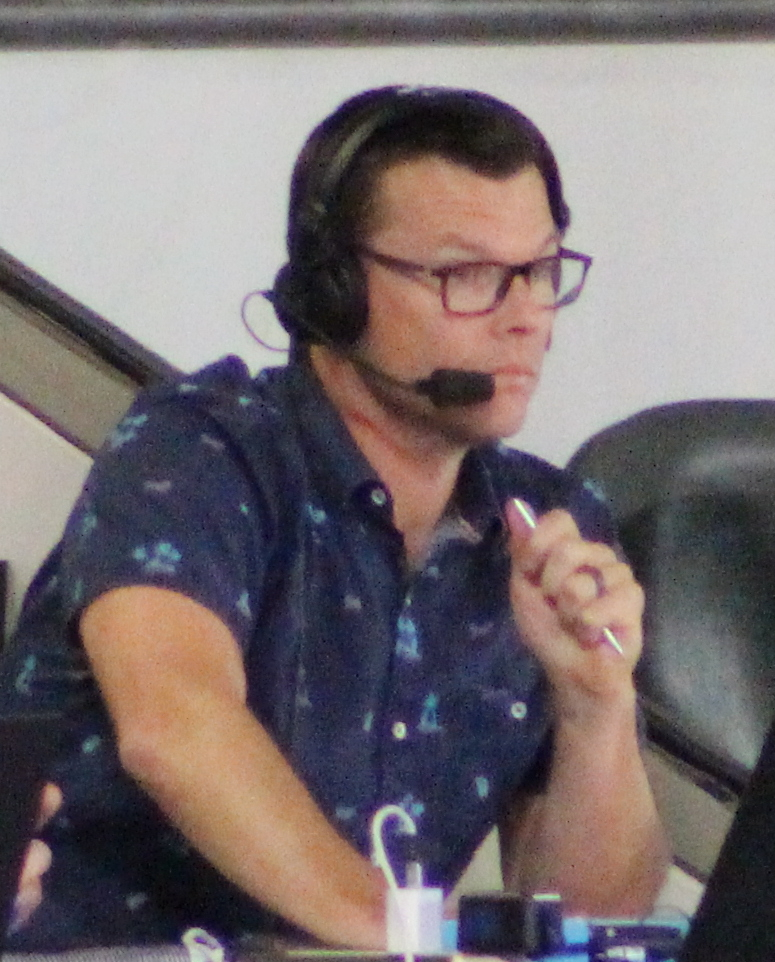
- Levering at Angel Stadium in 2024
- Born: August 2, 1983 (age 43)
- Occupation: Sportscaster
- Years active: 2005–present

Jeff Levering is an American sportscaster. Levering is currently the lead play-by-play announcer for the Milwaukee Brewers on MLB Local Media, LLC / Brewers.TV, and he served as the secondary announcer to Bob Uecker with the Brewers Radio Network (usually the primary for road games outside the Midwest). He was named to this position for the 2022 season.

== College ==
Levering graduated from Chapman University in 2005, where in 2003 he was the designated hitter on Chapman's 2003 Division III national championship team. Levering has joked that he "wasn't good enough" to pursue a career as a ballplayer, and so he turned to broadcasting to stay close to the game.

== Broadcasting career ==
His broadcasting career began in Rancho Cucamonga with the Class A Rancho Cucamonga Quakes of the California League. He was a radio broadcaster for the St. Louis Cardinals AA team from 2010 to 2012, then worked for the Boston Red Sox AAA team from 2012 to 2015. Levering then joined the Brewers radio team in 2015. In 2021, the Brewers announced that Levering would become a permanent broadcaster for the television broadcasts as Brian Anderson began to work more prominently for TNT Sports and CBS Sports. Levering also occasionally works for Fox Sports and BTN covering college basketball, football and baseball, including occasional Brewers games carried nationally as part of the MLB on Fox package. Upon the passing of legendary Brewers broadcaster Bob Uecker on January 16, 2025, Levering would become the Brewers main radio broadcaster, assisted by Lane Grindle. Levering would call the final out of the NLCS, when the Brewers swept the Los Angeles Dodgers. His call included a reference to Uecker's winning call from the movie Major League:

"The 0–2 pitch...Lined into the gap in left-center, Chourio back, he...makes the catch! The Brewers win the pennant! OH MY GOD, THE BREWERS WIN THE PENNANT! The World Series will go through Wisconsin!"

Levering would go on to also call the final out of the 2026 World Series, which the Brewers won in five games over the Tampa Bay Rays, giving the franchise its first-ever World Series title:

"The 2-1 pitch...groundball, second base. Turang has it, throws to first...THE WAIT IS OVER! THE BREWERS HAVE WON THE WORLD SERIES! They have done it! This relentless bunch, who nobody gave a chance to at the beginning of the season, sits atop the baseball world! 57 years of waiting, and the first World Series Championship in franchise history has arrived!"
