= William Contreras =

Venezuelan baseball player (born 1997)

- Contreras being interviewed after the 2026 World Series

Milwaukee Brewers – No. 24
- Catcher
- Born: December 24, 1997 (age 28); Puerto Cabello, Venezuela
- Bats: Right Throws: Right

MLB debut
- July 24, 2020, for the Atlanta Braves

MLB statistics (through 2026 season)
- Batting average: .272
- Home runs: 103
- Runs batted in: 409
- Stats at Baseball Reference

Teams
- Atlanta Braves (2020–2022); Milwaukee Brewers (2023–present)

Career highlights and awards
- 3× All-Star (2022, 2024, 2026); 2× World Series champion (2021, 2026); World Series MVP (2026); All-MLB First Team (2024); 2× Silver Slugger Award (2023, 2024)
Medals
Men's baseball
Representing Venezuela
World Baseball Classic
Gold medal – first place	2026 Miami	Team

William Jesús Contreras (born December 24, 1997), nicknamed "Wild Bill", is a Venezuelan professional baseball catcher for the Milwaukee Brewers of Major League Baseball (MLB).

Contreras signed with the Atlanta Braves organization in 2015, debuted in the major leagues on Opening Day 2020, and was a member of the 2021 World Series champion Braves team. He was first named an All-Star in 2022 before being traded to the Brewers, where he received the Silver Slugger Award in 2023 and 2024, was named to his second and third All-Star Games in 2024 and 2026, and became the MVP of the 2026 World Series, the first championship in Brewers franchise history.

== Early life ==
William Contreras is the youngest child of William and Olga Contreras.

Contreras grew up playing baseball with a broomstick bat and balls made from paper and tape with his older brothers, Wilmer and Willson, who is also a Major League catcher and first baseman. He describes his childhood as working class, with food always being on the table, but his parents working long hours.

Playing baseball in his youth, Contreras primarily played middle infield, before focusing on catching and hitting after signing with the Atlanta Braves as a 17-year-old.

== Career ==
=== Atlanta Braves ===
Contreras signed with the Atlanta Braves as an international free agent for $10,000 in February 2015. He made his professional debut with the DSL Braves in 2015, hitting .314/.370/.413/.783 with 32 runs batted in (RBIs). He played for the GCL Braves in 2016 and hit .264/.346/.375/.721 with one home run and eight RBIs.

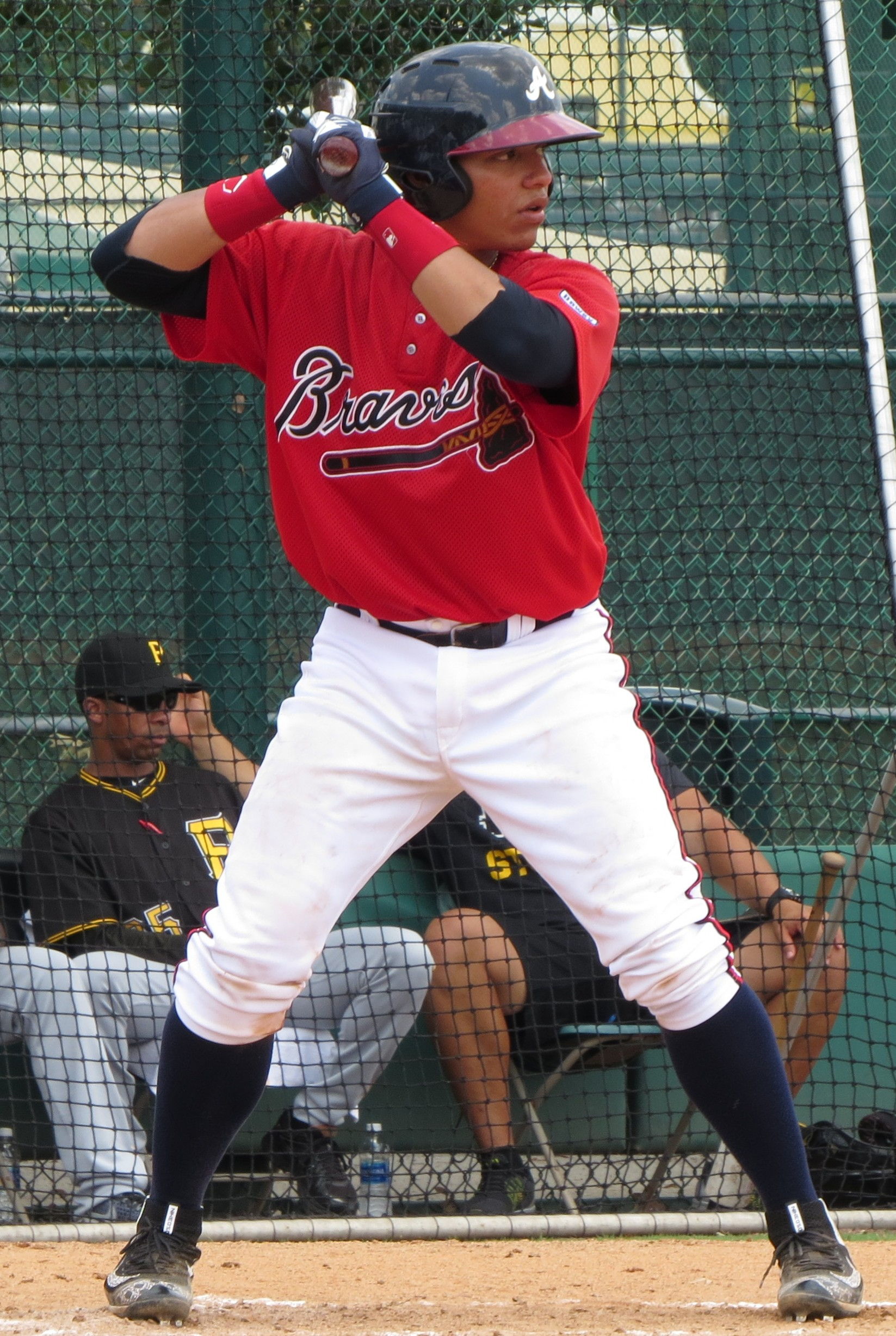
Contreras batting for the Gulf Coast League Braves in 2016

Contreras played for the Danville Braves in 2017, hitting .290/.379/.432/.811 with four home runs and 25 RBIs. He split the 2018 season between the Rome Braves and the Florida Fire Frogs, hitting a combined .285/.347/.436/.783 with 11 home runs and 49 RBIs. He split the 2019 season between Florida and the Mississippi Braves, hitting a combined .255/.315/.354/.669 with 6 home runs and 39 RBIs.

The Braves added Contreras to their 40 man roster following the 2019 season to protect him from being eligible in the Rule 5 draft. He was invited to the regularly held 2020 spring training, as well as summer camp, held prior to opening day of the shortenend 2020 season. Contreras was activated on July 24, 2020, and made his major league debut that day as a backup catcher. His first career hit and run batted in came as a pinch-hitter the next day, while facing Hunter Strickland. In 2020 he was four-for-ten with a double and an RBI.

On May 5, 2021, Contreras hit his first career home run against Washington Nationals pitcher Erick Fedde. He split the 2021 season between Triple-A team Gwinnett Stripers and Atlanta. While in the majors, he batted .215/.303/.399 with eight home runs and 23 RBIs. The Braves finished with an 88–73 record, clinching the NL East, and eventually won the 2021 World Series, giving the Braves their first title since 1995. Contreras was on the roster for the Braves throughout the post-season, but never appeared in the World Series as primary catcher Travis d'Arnaud played every inning for the Braves in the championship. Regardless, William and Willson Contreras became the tenth set of brothers in MLB history to have each won a World Series.

Contreras made the Atlanta Braves' 2022 Opening Day roster as a backup catcher, and again split the year between Atlanta and Gwinnett, where he was expected to improve his skills as a catcher. Contreras was named to the 2022 Major League Baseball All-Star Game as an injury replacement for designated hitter Bryce Harper. William and his brother Willson became the fifteenth pair of brothers to be selected to an All-Star Game.

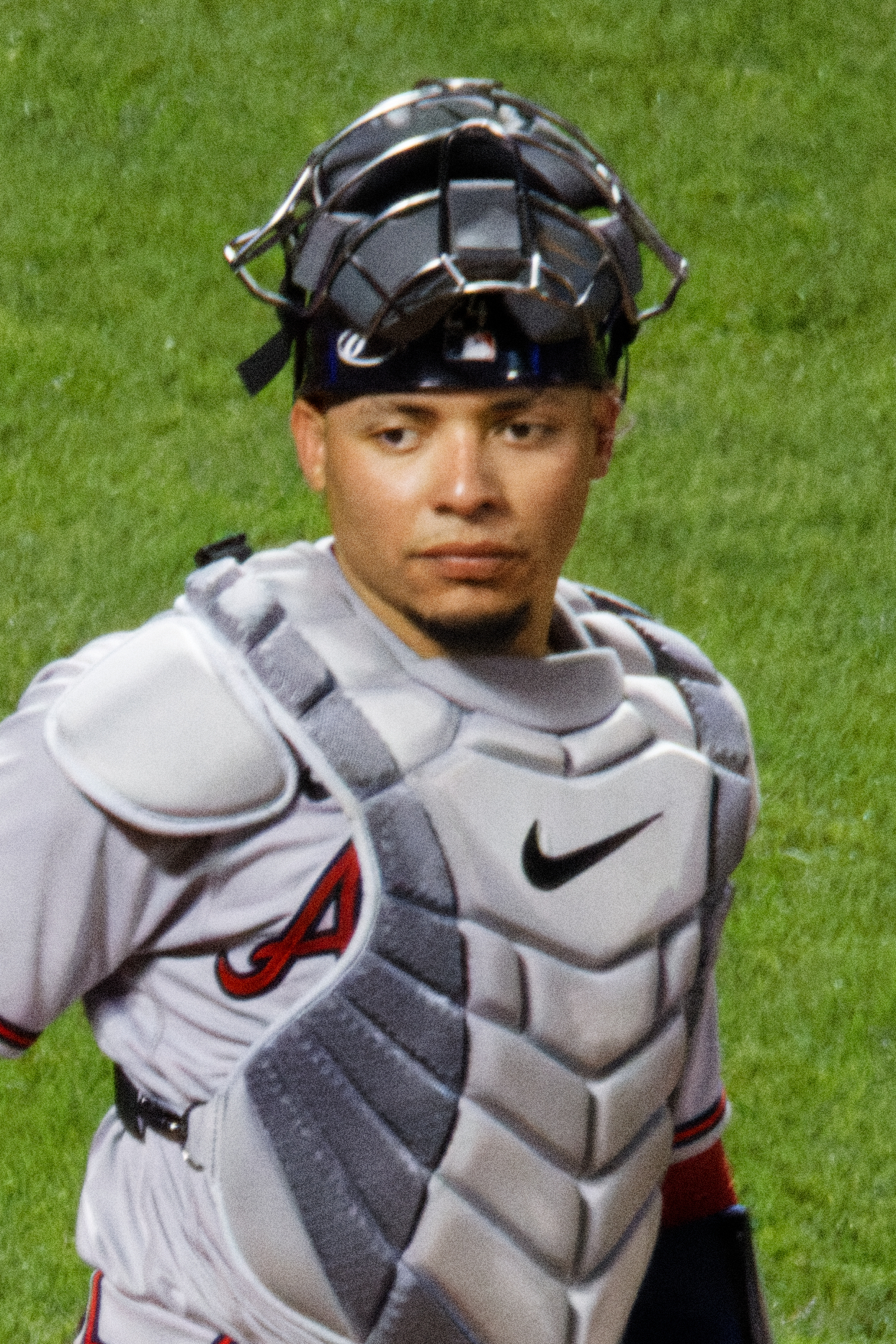
Contreras with the Braves in 2022

=== Milwaukee Brewers ===
On December 12, 2022, the Braves sent Contreras to the Milwaukee Brewers in a three-team trade in which the Braves acquired Sean Murphy, the Brewers also acquired Joel Payamps and Justin Yeager, and the Oakland Athletics acquired Esteury Ruiz, Kyle Muller, Freddy Tarnok, Manny Piña, and Royber Salinas. In 2023, Contreras played 141 games, batting .289/.367/.457 with an OPS of .825. His defense at catcher improved significantly, and he won a Silver Slugger award at the end of the season, as well as finishing 11th in NL MVP voting.

In 2024, Contreras played in 155 games, batting .281/.365/.466 with an OPS of .831. He finished 5th in NL MVP voting, the first Brewer to finish in the top five since Christian Yelich finished runner-up in 2019.

In 2025, Contreras played in 150 games, batting .260/.355/.399 with an OPS of .754. He also hit 17 home runs and scored 76 RBI.The Brewers finished with a 97–65 record, clinching the NL Central and home-field advantage in the playoffs. Contreras had surgery in October on a fractured left middle finger, which he had played with for the majority of the season.

==== 2026 ====
Contreras played in his first World Baseball Classic in March 2026, failing to record a hit but playing a crucial defensive role as his Venezuelan team won the WBC for the first time. Contreras was named to his third All-Star Game in 2026. It was the second time that both he and his brother Willson were named to the game, and the first time they were on opposing teams. On July 19, Contreras hit a walk–off home run against Pete Fairbanks, clinching a series sweep over the Miami Marlins.

The Brewers won their first World Series in franchise history in 2026 World Series, giving Contreras his second title. He collected RBI in four of five World Series games, hit .381, threw out four baserunners, and had 10 successful ABS challenges. Contreras became the seventh-ever catcher to be named World Series Most Valuable Player.

Contreras — along with Brewers teammates and fellow Venezuelans Jackson Chourio and Antonio Senzatela — became the 3rd, 4th, and 5th players ever to win the WBC and World Series in the same year. His 2026 success came amidst a tragic, emotional season due to the 2026 Venezuela earthquakes that killed more than 6,500 and sent shockwaves through Major League Baseball; Contreras played a role in organizing relief efforts while continuing to compete in the U.S.

== Personal life ==
He is engaged to Nixzali Adames, sister of former Brewers teammate Willy Adames.

In 2024, Contreras signed with Air Jordan, representing the brand through his cleats and catching gear.
