= Garrett Mitchell (baseball) =

American baseball player (born 1998)

- Mitchell with the Brewers

Milwaukee Brewers – No. 5
- Center fielder
- Born: September 4, 1998 (age 28); Orange, California, U.S.
- Bats: Left Throws: Right

MLB debut
- August 27, 2022, for the Milwaukee Brewers

MLB statistics (through 2026 season)
- Batting average: .259
- Home runs: 24
- Runs batted in: 105
- Stats at Baseball Reference

Teams
- Milwaukee Brewers (2022–present)

Career highlights and awards
- World Series champion (2026)

Garrett Cameron Mitchell (born September 4, 1998) is an American professional baseball center fielder for the Milwaukee Brewers of Major League Baseball (MLB). Mitchell was selected 20th overall by the Brewers in the 2020 MLB draft.

== Early life ==
Mitchell grew up in Orange, California, and attended the Lutheran High School of Orange County, where he was a four-year member of the varsity baseball team. He was diagnosed with Type 1 Diabetes at nine years old.

Regarded as a top collegiate prospect, Mitchell committed to the University of California, Los Angeles (UCLA) to play college baseball for the UCLA Bruins during his sophomore year at Lutheran. He batted .299 with 19 runs scored and 11 runs batted in (RBIs) despite a slow start as a junior. He played in the 2016 Perfect Game All-America Baseball Game and the Under Armour All-America Baseball Game.

The Oakland Athletics selected Mitchell in the 14th round (411 overall) of the 2017 Major League Baseball draft, but he opted not to sign with the team and attend UCLA. Mitchell played summer collegiate baseball after graduating high school for the Walla Walla Sweets of the West Coast League, batting .462 with one home run and four RBIs in 13 at-bats.

== College career ==
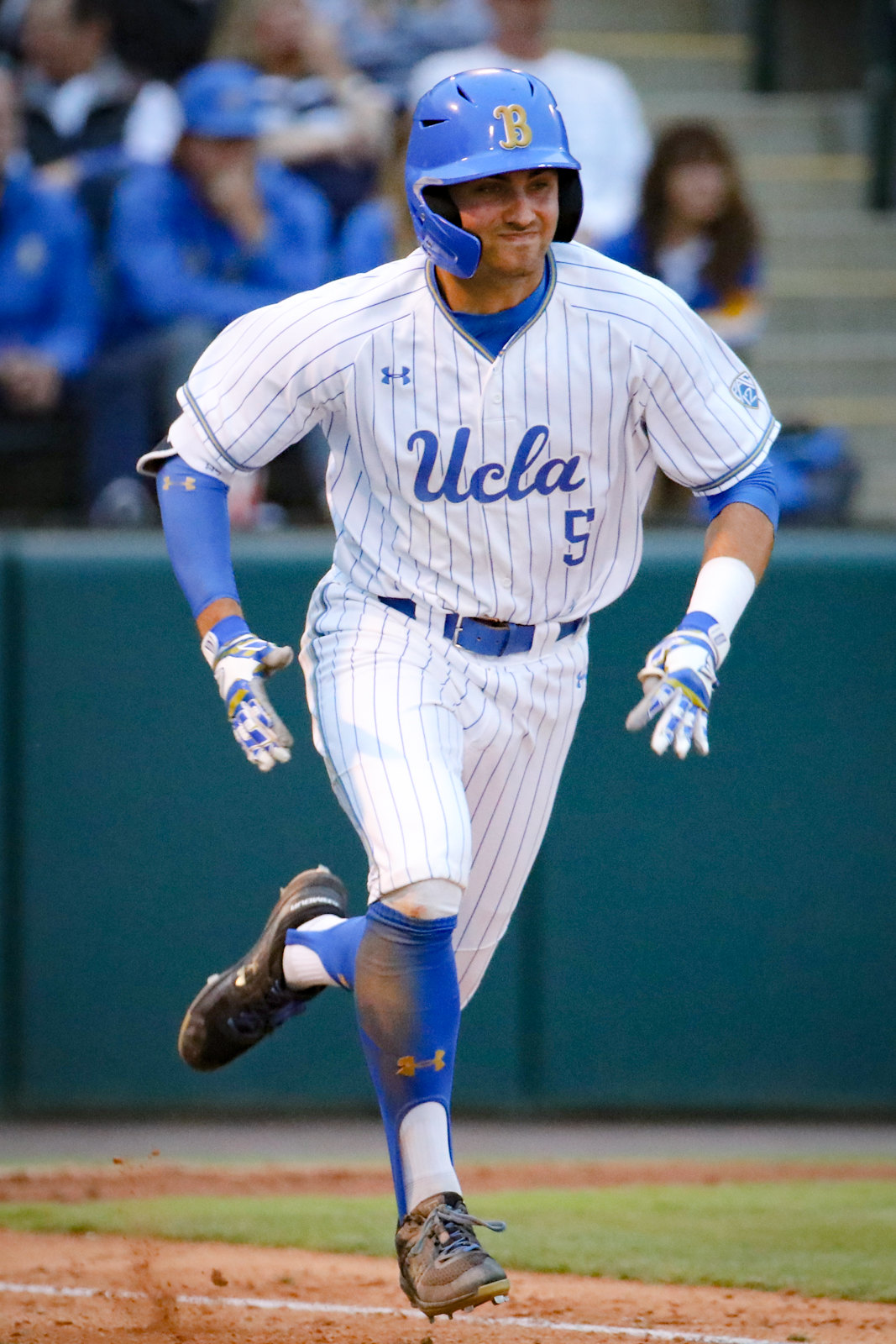
Mitchell with UCLA

As a true freshman, Mitchell was named the Bruins starting right fielder and the Preseason Freshman of the Year by Baseball America. Over 44 games, he batted .280 with 44 hits and 31 RBIs, missing time during the season due to health issues. Mitchell played summer baseball in the Northwoods League for the Mankato MoonDogs. During his sophomore year in 2019, he batted .349 with 14 doubles, 12 triples (a UCLA single season record), six home runs, 57 runs scored, and 41 RBIs and was named first team All-Pac-12 Conference and a third team All-American by the NCBWA and ABCA. Mitchell spent the following summer playing for the United States collegiate national baseball team.

Mitchell entered his junior season on the watch list for the Golden Spikes Award and as a top prospect for the 2020 Major League Baseball draft. Mitchell batted .355 with nine RBIs and 18 runs with five stolen bases before the season was cut short due to the coronavirus pandemic.

== Professional career ==
The Milwaukee Brewers selected Mitchell in the first round, with the 20th overall pick, in the 2020 Major League Baseball draft. He signed with the Brewers on July 7 and received a $3.2 million bonus. Mitchell did not play in a game in 2020 due to the cancellation of the minor league season because of the COVID-19 pandemic. Mitchell was named to Milwaukee's 2021 spring training roster as a non-roster invitee and batted .367 with one home run and six RBI in 22 games.

Mitchell was assigned to the High-A Wisconsin Timber Rattlers to start the 2021 season. He was promoted to the Double-A Biloxi Shuckers in early July after slashing .359/.504/.620 with five home runs, 33 runs scored, 20 RBI, and 12 stolen bases over 28 games with the Timber Rattlers. Over 35 games with Biloxi to end the season, he batted .186/.291/.264 with three home runs and ten RBI over 35 games. He missed time during the season due to a leg injury.

Mitchell returned to Biloxi to start the 2022 season. He suffered an oblique injury in May and was placed on the injured list until July 7, 2022, after a rehab assignment with the Arizona Complex League Brewers. Mitchell batted .277 with four home runs and 25 RBI in 44 games with the Shuckers before being promoted to the Triple-A Nashville Sounds.

On August 27, 2022, the Brewers selected Mitchell's contract from Nashville, promoting him to the major leagues. He missed the phone call from Sounds manager Rick Sweet informing him of his promotion to the majors, telling reporters it was because he was eating a chocolate chip cookie. Mitchell made his debut later that day against the Chicago Cubs, playing center field at the end of the game. He had his first major league start the day after, on August 28, playing center field and batting 9th. Mitchell's first at-bat resulted in a flyout to left field. His second at-bat was his first major league hit, a two RBI double into centerfield that gave Milwaukee the lead. Mitchell hit his first home run against Wil Crowe of the Pittsburgh Pirates in the bottom of the eighth inning on August 29. Mitchell completed the 2022 season batting .311/.373/.459 with 19 hits, two home runs, and nine RBI, all in 28 games.

In 2023, Mitchell made the Opening Day roster for the Brewers, and also made the starting lineup, batting 7th and playing center field. On April 2, 2023 against the Chicago Cubs, Mitchell hit his first MLB career triple, a sharp line drive to right field, driving in Brian Anderson. Two days later, in a game against the New York Mets, Mitchell had his first career two home-run game. On May 4, Mitchell underwent shoulder surgery to repair the labrum in his left shoulder. According to manager Craig Counsell, the procedure was likely to end Mitchell's season. On September 28, Mitchell was activated from the injured list. He played in 19 total games for Milwaukee in 2023, hitting .246/.315/.446 with three home runs and seven RBI.

In 2024, Mitchell suffered a broken left hand in spring training and was placed on the injured list to begin the season. He was transferred to the 60–day injured list on April 14, 2024. Mitchell was activated from the injured list on July 1. Later that year, his most memorable MLB moment occurred on October 2 when his two-run home run with two outs in the bottom of 8th carried the Brewers to a 5-3 victory over the New York Mets in Game 2 of the Wild Card series.

Mitchell played in 25 games for the Brewers to begin the 2025 season, hitting .206/.286/.294 with three RBI and three stolen bases. On April 26, 2025, Mitchell was placed on the injured list due to a left oblique strain. On June 28, it was announced that Mitchell would undergo surgery to repair a shoulder injury he suffered during his rehabilitation stint with Triple-A Nashville. On July 1, it was announced that Mitchell would likely miss the remainder of the season as a result of the procedure.

Mitchell during the Brewers victory parade for the 2026 World Series

In Game 4 of the 2026 National League Division Series, Mitchell made a game-saving catch on a potential home run by Manny Machado to help the Brewers defeat the San Diego Padres and advance to the 2026 National League Championship Series. In Game 4 of that NLCS against the back-to-back defending World Series champion Los Angeles Dodgers, with the Brewers up 3-0 in the series and tied 4-4 in the game, Mitchell hit what was ultimately the pennant-winning solo home run, as Milwaukee eventually won 6-4 to clinch their first World Series appearance since 1982. After five games against the Tampa Bay Rays, the Brewers won their World Series title in franchise history.

== Personal life ==
At the age of 9, Mitchell was diagnosed with type 1 diabetes, which he regulates with an insulin pump.

In 2021, Mitchell married professional softball player Haley Cruse.

Mitchell is a Christian.
