= 2026 World Series =

Major League Baseball's championship series

Team (Wins)	Managers	Season
Milwaukee Brewers (4)	Pat Murphy	103–59 (.636), GA: 14
Tampa Bay Rays (1)	Kevin Cash	98–64 (.605), GA: 4.5
- Dates: October 23–28
- Venue(s): American Family Field (Milwaukee); Tropicana Field (St. Petersburg)
- MVP: William Contreras (Milwaukee)
- Umpires: Dan Bellino, Vic Carapazza, Tripp Gibson, James Hoye (crew chief), Nic Lentz, Gabe Morales, Jim Wolf

Broadcast
- Television: Fox (United States – English); Fox Deportes (United States – Spanish); MLB International (International – English); Sportsnet (Note: Simulcasting the MLB International feed) (Canada – English); RDS (Canada – French); NHK (Note: Game 1 on NHK G and NHK BSP4K Games 2–5 on NHK BS) (Japan – Japanese); J Sports 3 (Japan – Japanese); SPOTV (South Korea – Korean)
- TV announcers: Joe Davis, John Smoltz, Ken Rosenthal, and Tom Verducci (Fox); Adrián García Márquez, Edgar González, Carlos Álvarez, Jaime Motta, and Rolando Nichols (Fox Deportes); Dave Flemming and Ryan Spilborghs (MLB International); Alain Usereau and Marc Griffin (RDS); Takashi Saito, Shuhei Takagi, and Keita Ito (NHK); Shunji Shimamura, Satoshi Nakajima, Ichiro Kubota, Ryuichi Kumagai, Aki Inose, Shigekazu Mori, Yuichi Setsumaru, Hitoshi Tamura, Kei Fukazawa, Yasuhiko Yabuta, Yuji Kondo, and Taro Fukuda (J Sports 3)
- Radio: ESPN (United States – English); TUDN (United States – Spanish); WTMJ (MIL – English); WDAE (TB – English); WQBN (TB – Spanish)
- Radio announcers: Jon Sciambi, Jessica Mendoza, Eduardo Pérez, and Buster Olney (ESPN); Alberto Ferreiro, Luis Quiñones, Daniel Alvarez, and Jesús Acosta (TUDN); Jeff Levering, Lane Grindle, and Josh Maurer (WTMJ); Neil Solondz, Andy Freed, and Chris Adams-Wall (WDAE); Ricardo Taveras and Enrique Oliu (WQBN)
- ALCS: Tampa Bay Rays over Cleveland Guardians (4–2)
- NLCS: Milwaukee Brewers over Los Angeles Dodgers (4–0)

The 2026 World Series was the championship series of Major League Baseball's (MLB) 2026 season. The 122nd edition of the World Series, the best-of-seven playoff series was played from October 23 to 28 by the American League (AL) champion Tampa Bay Rays and the National League (NL) champion Milwaukee Brewers. The Brewers defeated the Rays in five games to win their first championship in franchise history. Brewers catcher William Contreras was named the World Series Most Valuable Player (MVP) after batting .381 and going 10-for-13 on Automated Ball-Strike System (ABS) challenges in the series.

Both the Brewers and Rays were seeking their first World Series championship. The Brewers swept the Los Angeles Dodgers to win their first National League pennant, and their second pennant after winning in the American League in 1982. The Rays won their third American League pennant after defeating the Cleveland Guardians in six games, and their first since 2020. The Brewers had home-field advantage due to their league-best win–loss record.

The first two games saw narrow Brewers victories. In Game 1, the Brewers maintained an early lead to win 3–2. In Game 2, they overcame the Rays' four runs in the first inning to win 5–4. In Game 3, the Brewers blew out the Rays, scoring 10 runs by the fifth inning and winning 10–1. Tampa Bay's lone win came in Game 4, when pinch hitter Ben Williamson hit a walk-off single in the twelfth inning for a 4–3 comeback victory. Milwaukee closed the series in Game 5, maintaining another early lead to win 4–1 and clinch the title.

After the Brewers won the World Series, all of Wisconsin's major league sports teams had won a championship.

== Background ==
The 2026 World Series was the first postseason meeting of the Brewers and Rays, teams linked since 1998, when the creation of the Tampa Bay Devil Rays as an American League team caused Milwaukee to be reassigned to the National League. In the 2026 regular season, the Brewers won two of three games against the Rays.

The luxury tax payroll for the Milwaukee Brewers (ranked 17th of 30, $192 million) and Tampa Bay Rays (21st, $161 million) guaranteed that the winner of the World Series would have the lowest-ranked payroll salary since the 2017 Houston Astros; it was the lowest ranking combined payroll for World Series teams since 1991. Due to these factors and the looming lockout due to inequality between large-market and small-market teams (among other issues), this was dubbed the "Small Market World Series".

It was the first World Series since 1980 in which neither team had previously won a championship; the first since 2016 without a team from California or Texas; and the first ever to use the Automated Ball-Strike (ABS) System, which made its league-wide debut in the 2026 season. It was the sixth World Series in the Wild-Card era (1995–present) to feature the teams with the best records in each league, which last occurred in 2024. It was the fourth World Series to have two Expansion era teams (after 2015, 2019, and 2023) and the second, after 2023, in which the teams' home venues had a retractable roof or dome. (Note: Due to the coronavirus outbreak, the 2020 World Series took place entirely at Globe Life Field, a retractable-roof stadium, but that site was neither the Dodgers' or Rays' home venue.)

=== Milwaukee Brewers ===
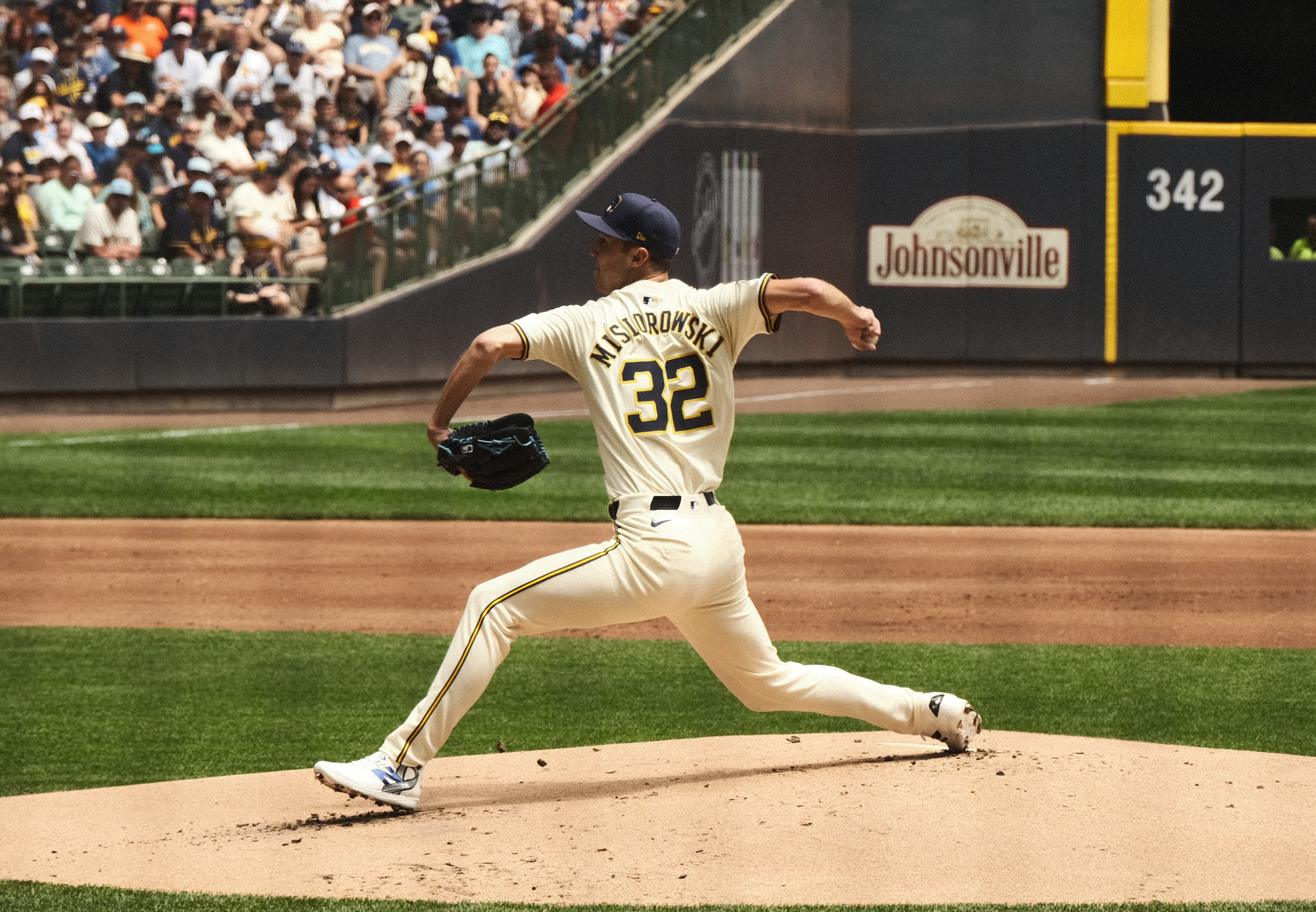
Cy Young award winner Jacob Misiorowski had a breakout season, leading MLB in strikeouts and earned run average in his second year.

Despite trading team ace Freddy Peralta to the New York Mets and everyday third baseman Caleb Durbin to the Boston Red Sox in the off-season, the Milwaukee Brewers had another excellent regular season. After an 18–16 (.529) start to the season, they lost just five games from May 8 through June 2. At the All-Star break, they led the National League Central by five games over the Chicago Cubs, as starter Jacob Misiorowski (MLB's season leader in earned run average (ERA) and strikeouts) and catcher William Contreras were selected to the National League All-Star team. After the break, the Brewers continued to win at a torrid pace, going 44–22 (.667) the rest of the season. Along the way, they achieved many notable milestones. On August 11, they defeated the Seattle Mariners 22–0, tying a franchise record and matching the most lopsided shutout in MLB since 1887. On September 11, they clinched a postseason berth with a 20–0 win over the Cincinnati Reds. They were the first team to finish a season among the top three MLB teams in runs scored and among the bottom three in home runs since the 1960 Chicago White Sox; they also led the league in batting average and on-base percentage, and finished second in stolen bases. They finished winning 100 games for the first time in franchise history, completing the season with a 103–59 (.636) record. It marked their fourth consecutive National League Central title, and they secured home-field advantage throughout the postseason for the second consecutive season. The Brewers' playoff slogan became "Win Our Way", referring to the team's winning in different ways compared to conventional baseball thinking of the time.

Brewers "Win Our Way" poster displayed on a screen at the Baird Center, 2026

As the overall top seed in the postseason, the Brewers took on the fourth-seeded San Diego Padres in the National League Division Series, which they won in four games. The three Brewers' wins came when they withstood a Padres ninth-inning rally in Game 1, scored on a two-run walk-off hit by Jackson Chourio in the ninth inning against All-Star closer Mason Miller in Game 2, and secured their first road postseason win in 12 games in the Game 4 clincher. They then met the two-time defending World Series champion Los Angeles Dodgers in the National League Championship Series (NLCS), a rematch of the 2025 NLCS, in which the Brewers were swept. In this meeting, the Brewers returned the favor and swept the Dodgers to clinch their first World Series berth in 44 years. Six of Milwaukee’s seven postseason wins prior to the World Series featured comebacks. Entering the World Series, Milwaukee's bullpen had a 1.33 ERA in eight games, to go along with a 24.5% strikeout percentage while averaging 5 innings per game.

This was the second World Series appearance for the Brewers, after losing to the St. Louis Cardinals in 1982, and it marked their first as a National League team. (Note: The Brewers were a part of the American League from their inception in 1969 through 1997. They played one season as the Seattle Pilots in 1969 before moving to Milwaukee and rebranding as the Brewers.) This was the city of Milwaukee's fourth World Series appearance, having played in two with the Milwaukee Braves in 1957 and 1958, and now two with the Brewers. They became the second team, after the Houston Astros, to win pennants in both the American and National Leagues.

=== Tampa Bay Rays ===
The Rays receive the William Harridge Trophy after Game 6 of the ALCS at the Trop.

The Tampa Bay Rays played at George M. Steinbrenner Field for the 2025 season after Hurricane Milton damaged the roof of Tropicana Field, where they finished the season 77–85 (.475). In their return season to the Trop and their first under new owner Patrick Zalupski, the Rays had a 21-game turnaround, finishing 98–64 (.605). The Rays battled atop the American League East standings with the New York Yankees until they took control on June 13. From this date, they were tied with the Yankees for one day on June 27, and led the division outright for the remainder of the season. At the All-Star game, they sent an AL-leading five players, including third baseman Junior Caminero, starting pitchers Drew Rasmussen and Nick Martinez, closer Bryan Baker, and designated hitter Yandy Díaz. The trade deadline saw them bring in former Brewers ace Freddy Peralta after a poor half-season with the New York Mets. With the Rays, Peralta turned his season around, posting a 3.25 ERA, winning seven of his 13 starts, and later the ALCS MVP. The Rays clinched the AL East against the Yankees in the nightcap of a doubleheader win to clinch their first division title since 2021, and their fifth in franchise history; the win also meant the Rays held home-field advantage throughout the American League postseason.

Perhaps their biggest win of the season did not come on the field, but when Hillsborough County approved funding for the proposed new stadium in Tampa Bay on August 28, which put an end to relocation fears that had plagued the franchise for years.

As the top seed in the American League, the Rays swept the fourth-seeded New York Yankees in three games in the Division Series, with Drew Rasmussen's near no-hitter in Game 1 ending the team's seven-game postseason losing streak. In the Championship Series, they defeated the second-seeded Cleveland Guardians in six games to advance to the World Series for the first time since 2020 and the third time in franchise history (2008, 2020). Yandy Diaz was the only remaining player from the 2020 team. (Note: Shane McClanahan was on the 2020 team as well, but he missed the 2026 postseason due to injury.) The Rays sought their first World Series victory after losing to the Phillies in 2008 and the Dodgers in 2020.

== Summary ==
Milwaukee won the series, 4–1.

Game	Date	Score	Location	Time	Attendance
1	October 23	Tampa Bay Rays – 2, Milwaukee Brewers – 3	American Family Field	3:09	43,250
2	October 24	Tampa Bay Rays – 4, Milwaukee Brewers – 5	American Family Field	3:38	43,245
3	October 26	Milwaukee Brewers – 10, Tampa Bay Rays – 1	Tropicana Field	3:00	40,388
4	October 27	Milwaukee Brewers – 3, Tampa Bay Rays – 4 (12)	Tropicana Field	4:20	40,514
5	October 28	Milwaukee Brewers – 4, Tampa Bay Rays – 1	Tropicana Field	3:05	40,489

== Matchups ==
=== Game 1 ===
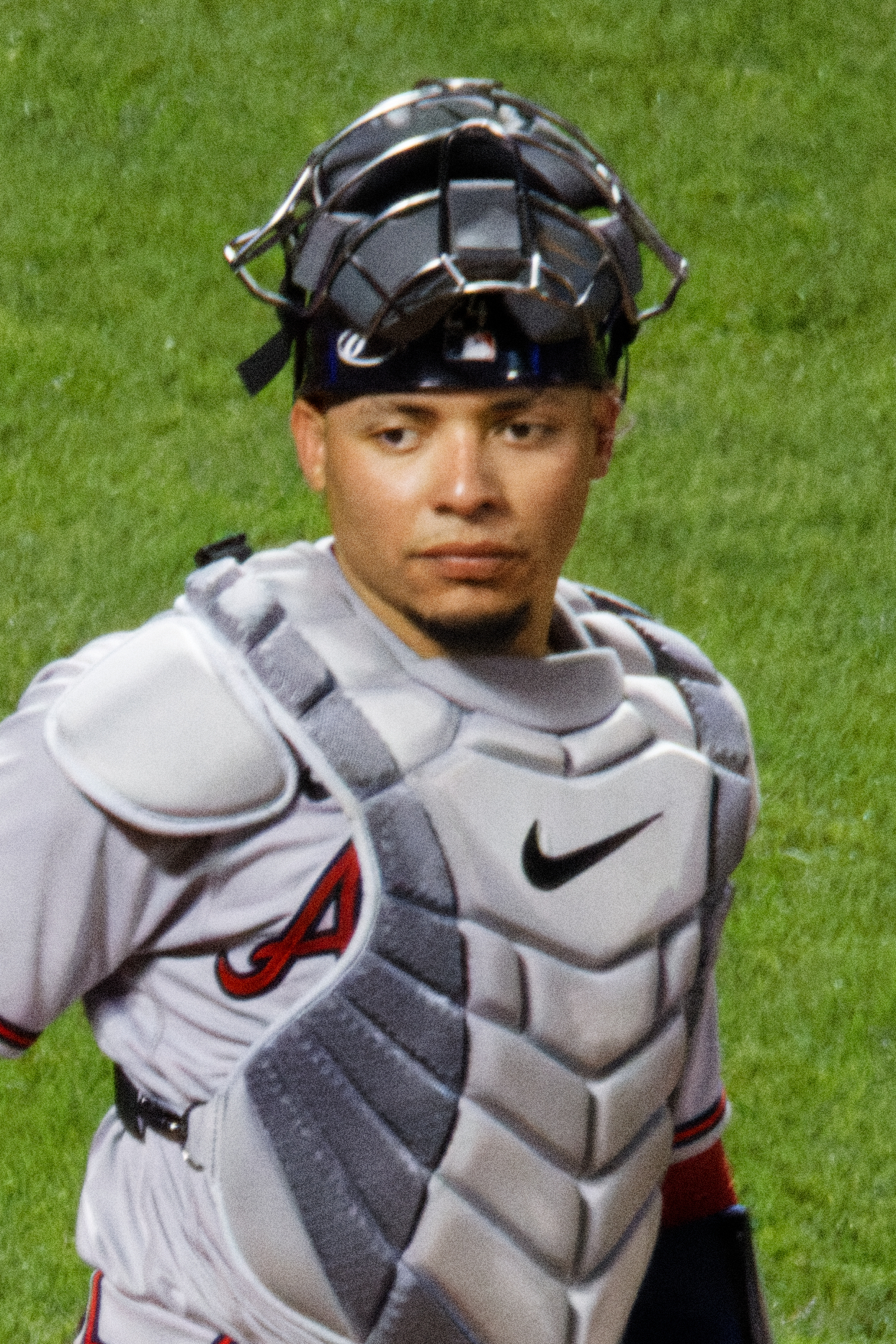
William Contreras batted 2-for-3 with an RBI in the Brewers' Game 1 victory.

October 23, 2026 7:15 pm (CDT) at American Family Field in Milwaukee, Wisconsin, 70 °F (21 °C), roof closed
Team	1	2	3	4	5	6	7	8	9	R	H	E
Tampa Bay	0	0	0	1	0	0	0	0	1	2	7	0
Milwaukee	2	0	0	0	0	0	1	0	X	3	8	0
WP: Jacob Misiorowski (1–0) LP: Nick Martinez (0–1) Sv: Trevor Megill (1); Attendance: 43,250; Boxscore

Game 1 of the 2026 World Series was the first World Series game to take place at American Family Field, with the last World Series game in Milwaukee taking place at Milwaukee County Stadium in Game 5 of the 1982 World Series. The Milwaukee Bucks of National Basketball Association moved the time of their home opener to 3 p.m. CT in order to not conflict with Game 1. The Brewers named Jacob Misiorowski as their starter for Game 1, with the Rays countering with veteran Nick Martinez. Mickey Guyton performed "The Star-Spangled Banner". Longtime Brewers shortstop and Baseball Hall-of-Famer Robin Yount threw out the ceremonial first pitch, with the ceremonial ball being given to Yount by Brewers founder and former MLB commissioner Bud Selig.

After Misiorowski induced a double play to get out of a jam in the top of the first inning, the Brewers scored the game's first runs in the bottom of the first inning on a single by Jackson Chourio, a run batted in (RBI) triple by Christian Yelich, and an RBI single by William Contreras. The Rays scored their first run in the top of the fourth inning to cut the deficit in half 2–1, with a walk by Jonathan Aranda, a double by Junior Caminero, and an RBI groundout by Liam Hicks, but left the tying run at third base. Misiorowski pitched five innings, giving up four hits, one run, and striking out three batters. Rays starter Nick Martinez nearly matched him after a rocky first, pitching five innings, giving up five hits, two runs, and striking out five batters.

In the bottom of the seventh inning, with Cooper Pratt on second base, Chourio hit an RBI single, extending the Brewers' lead 3–1. The Rays loaded the bases in the ninth inning against Milwaukee closer Trevor Megill. Liam Hicks hit a ball that initially was ruled a game-ending double play, but after a Rays challenge, replay showed that Pratt took his foot off the second base bag before he caught the ball. It was subsequently overturned to an RBI groundout that scored Jorge Mateo, and the game continued. Jonny DeLuca then struck out to end the game, giving Milwaukee the 3–2 win. This was the third time thus far this postseason that Megill had put the go-ahead runners on base in the ninth inning, though he escaped each game with the save.

Misiorowski's first pitch of the night was measured at 103.5 mph (166.57 km/h), the fastest pitch ever recorded in a World Series game (topping the 103.2 mph (166.08 km/h) pitch by relief pitcher Aroldis Chapman in 2016) as well as the fastest by a World Series starter (the Mets' Noah Syndergaard threw a 101.1 mph (162.70 km/h) pitch in Game 3 of the 2015 Series). (Note: MLB began recording World Series pitch velocity in 2008.) The second inning featured the first ABS challenge in a World Series game; catcher William Contreras successfully challenged a ball that ABS determined to be a strike, resulting in an inning-ending strikeout of Víctor Mesa Jr. This was the first World Series Game 1 since 2000 to not feature any home runs.

=== Game 2 ===
American Family Field prior to the start of game 2

Sal Frelick hit a game-tying home run in the sixth inning for Milwaukee.

October 24, 2026 7:09 pm (CDT) at American Family Field in Milwaukee, Wisconsin, 71 °F (22 °C), roof closed
Team	1	2	3	4	5	6	7	8	9	R	H	E
Tampa Bay	4	0	0	0	0	0	0	0	0	4	7	1
Milwaukee	2	0	0	1	0	1	1	0	X	5	11	1
WP: Abner Uribe (1–0) LP: Tyler Wells (0–1) Sv: Aaron Ashby (1); Home runs: TB: Liam Hicks (1); MIL: Sal Frelick (1); Attendance: 43,245; Boxscore

Kylie Cantrall performed the national anthem, and Hall-of-Fame former Brewers third baseman Paul Molitor threw the ceremonial first pitch. Rays ace Drew Rasmussen started for Tampa Bay, while rookie Logan Henderson started for Milwaukee.

Yandy Díaz reached second base on an error by Cooper Pratt to open the game, and scored on an RBI single by Chandler Simpson. Simpson stole second base and scored on an RBI single by Caminero. Liam Hicks then hit a two-run home run. In the bottom of the first inning, Jackson Chourio and Jake Bauers led off for Milwaukee with singles; Chourio scored on an RBI single by William Contreras, and Bauers scored on an RBI single by Garrett Mitchell. Henderson left the game after pitching three innings.

In the bottom of the fourth inning, Pratt walked and Sal Frelick singled, with Pratt scoring on a fielding error by Jonathan Aranda on a ground ball by David Hamilton. A walk to Bauers loaded the bases, and Cam Booser relieved Rasmussen, retiring Christian Yelich on a groundout. With Ian Seymour pitching for the Rays in the bottom of the sixth inning, Frelick hit a home run to tie the game at 4–4. Milwaukee took a 5–4 lead in the bottom of the seventh inning when Brice Turang doubled and Pratt hit an RBI single. After a scoreless eighth inning, Jonny DeLuca started the top of the ninth inning with a double off of Aaron Ashby, but was stranded there as the Brewers won the game. Milwaukee's bullpen tossed six scoreless innings after Henderson's exit. It was their seventh come-from-behind win of the 2026 postseason.

=== Game 3 ===
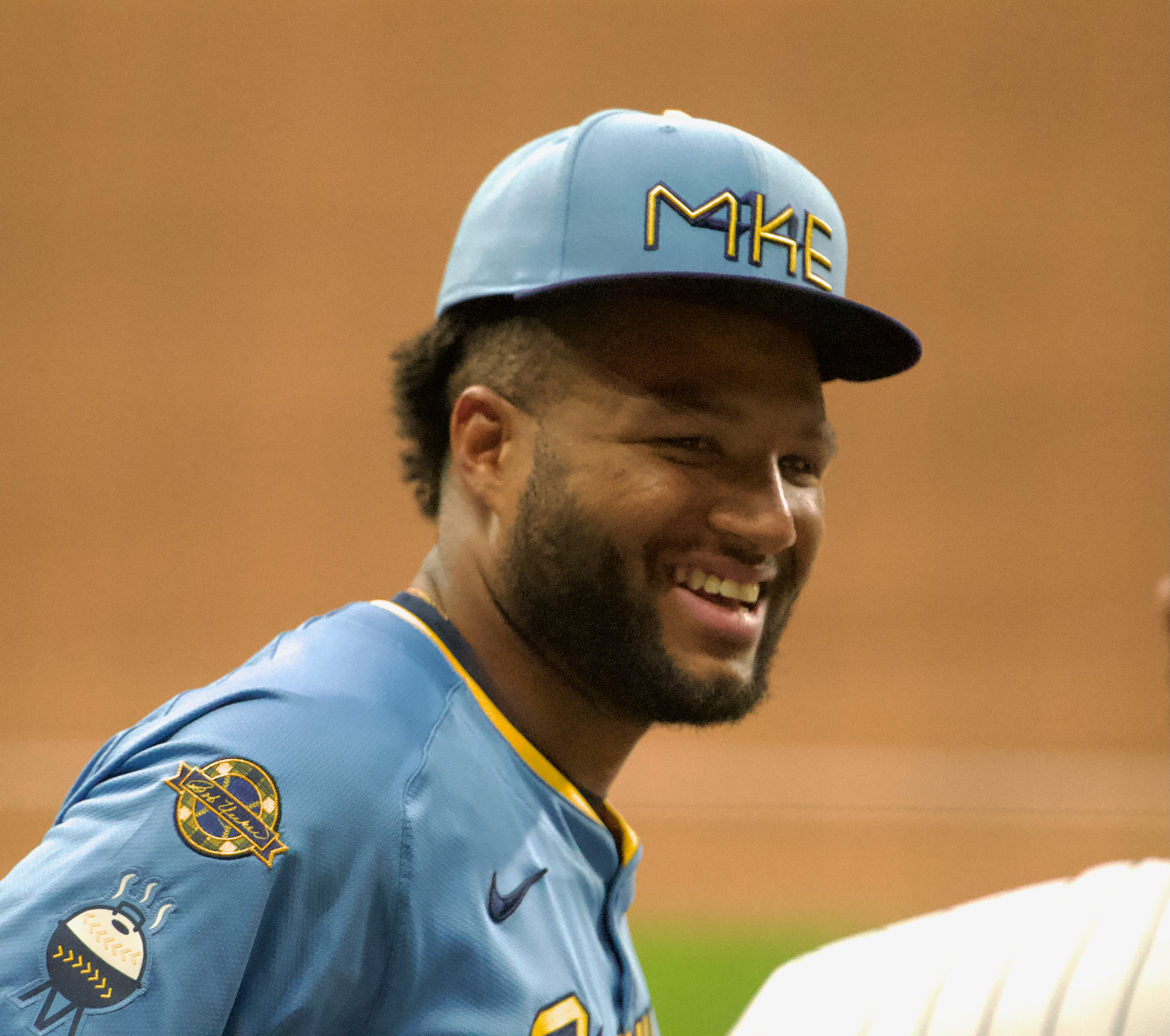
Jackson Chourio batted 4-for-5 in Game 3.

October 26, 2026 8:10 pm (EDT) at Tropicana Field in St. Petersburg, Florida, 70 °F (21 °C), Dome
Team	1	2	3	4	5	6	7	8	9	R	H	E
Milwaukee	0	0	2	0	8	0	0	0	0	10	16	0
Tampa Bay	0	0	0	0	0	0	0	0	1	1	3	1
WP: Robert Gasser (1–0) LP: Freddy Peralta (0–1); Attendance: 40,388; Boxscore

Game 3 of the 2026 World Series marked the second time that World Series games were held at Tropicana Field, and the third game overall, following Game 2 of the 2008 World Series. The Rays' most recent World Series appearance in 2020 took place at Globe Life Field as a neutral venue due to the COVID-19 pandemic, which necessitated a neutral-site bubble. Carly Pearce sang the national anthem and former Rays manager Joe Maddon threw out the ceremonial first pitch. Freddy Peralta started Game 3 for the Rays, while the Brewers countered with Robert Gasser.

Milwaukee scored first in the top of the third inning with a single by Jackson Chourio, a walk by Jake Bauers, and RBI singles by Christian Yelich and William Contreras. The Brewers loaded the bases in the fifth inning, knocking Freddy Peralta out of the game. With Cam Booser pitching, Brice Turang hit a two-RBI single, scoring Chourio and Yelich, followed by an RBI single by Garrett Mitchell, a two-RBI double by Cooper Pratt, and an RBI double by Sal Frelick. Booser left the game without recording an out, and Cole Sulser allowed an RBI single to David Hamilton and an RBI double to Chourio before getting out of the inning, with eight total two-out runs scored by the Brewers, all scored after the Brewers won a replay challenge of a called force-out of Yelich at second base to extend the inning. In the fifth inning, the Brewers became the first team to have seven consecutive hits in a postseason game.

Gasser pitched six innings, allowing one hit and no runs. The Rays scored their only run in the ninth inning on a double by Yandy Díaz off of Brandon Woodruff, the longest tenured Brewers player, who was pitching in his first game since July 4 after recovering from a shoulder injury. The nine-run win was the largest World Series blowout since Game 2 of the 2019 World Series. At 22 years old, Chourio became the youngest player to record four hits in a World Series game since Joe Garagiola in the 1946 World Series. In addition, Milwaukee's eight consecutive postseason wins from Game 4 of the NLDS onward matched the 2019 Nationals, 2014 Royals, 2005 White Sox, and 2004 Red Sox for the most consecutive playoff wins in MLB history.

=== Game 4 ===
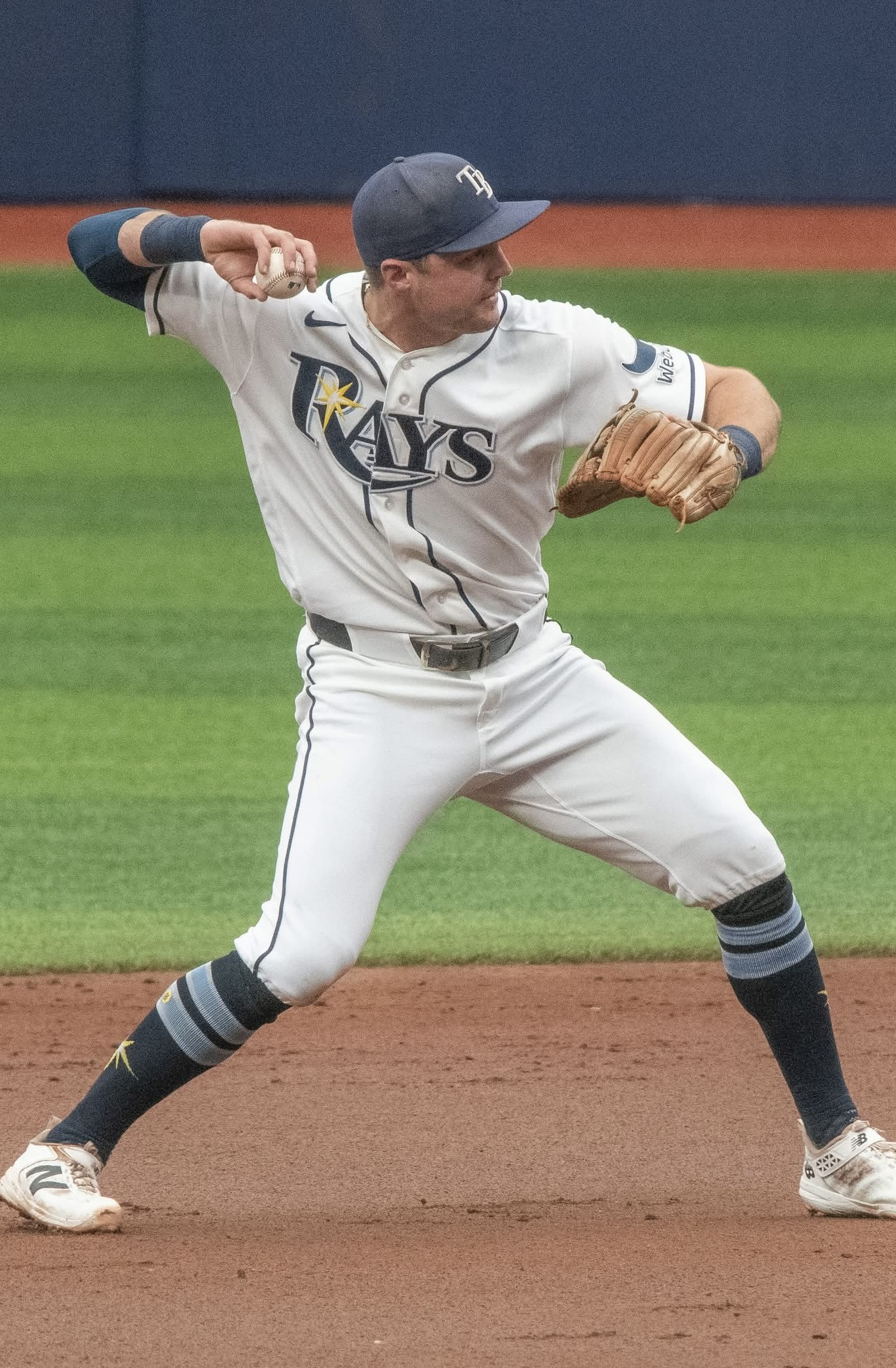
Ben Williamson hit a game-winning RBI single in extra innings in Game 4.

October 27, 2026 8:08 pm (EDT) at Tropicana Field in St. Petersburg, Florida, 72 °F (22 °C), Dome
Team	1	2	3	4	5	6	7	8	9	10	11	12	R	H	E
Milwaukee	0	0	0	1	1	0	0	0	0	0	0	1	3	8	2
Tampa Bay	0	1	0	1	0	0	0	0	0	0	0	2	4	9	1
WP: Ian Seymour (1–0) LP: Shane Drohan (0–1); Home runs: MIL: David Hamilton (1), Cooper Pratt (1); TB: None; Attendance: 40,514; Boxscore

Ne-Yo performed the national anthem, and longtime Rays third baseman Evan Longoria threw the ceremonial first pitch. Griffin Jax started Game 4 for Tampa Bay, while Dustin May started for Milwaukee.

In the bottom of the second inning, Jonny DeLuca scored on an RBI double by Chandler Simpson. The Brewers tied the game in the top of the fourth inning, when Sal Frelick hit a single and Cooper Pratt hit an RBI double. The Rays retook the lead in the bottom of the fourth inning on a fielder's choice by DeLuca that scored Caminero. David Hamilton had attempted to tag Caminero on DeLuca's groundout, missed, and then missed first base on his throw to first. Hamilton tied the game for Milwaukee in the top of the fifth inning with a home run. The game remained tied into extra innings.

In the top of the twelfth inning, Pratt hit a home run off Ian Seymour to break the tie, giving the Brewers a 3–2 lead. In the bottom half of the inning, Caminero reached on an error and Liam Hicks singled to get Caminero to third base; Cedric Mullins replaced Caminero as a pinch runner. DeLuca then hit a single to score Mullins and tie the game. Simpson, after an aborted plan to bunt the runners, singled to load the bases, and pinch hitter Ben Williamson hit a single into right field to score pinch runner Nick Fortes, spoiling the Brewers chance to clinch a championship and snapping their eight game winning streak. It was the first walk-off win for Tampa Bay in the postseason since Game 4 of the 2020 World Series, which was also their last World Series victory. This marked the first World Series walk-off pinch hit since Gene Larkin's Game 7 base hit to win the 1991 World Series for the Minnesota Twins in extra innings. With Milwaukee's defeat, the 1976 Cincinnati Reds remain the only team to sweep both a League Championship Series and World Series. (Note: The 1976 Reds sweeps occurred when the League Championship Series (LCS) was a best-of-five format. No team has swept through the necessary eight games it now requires through an LCS and World Series.)

Brewers left-handed reliever Aaron Ashby retired all seven batters he faced in Game 4, breaking Andrew Miller’s record for scoreless innings by a reliever in one postseason. Jackson Chourio also recorded two more hits in Game 4, giving him a total of 10 in the first four games of the Series; this tied the World Series record for most hits in the first four games of a Series, set by Babe Ruth in 1928.

=== Game 5 ===
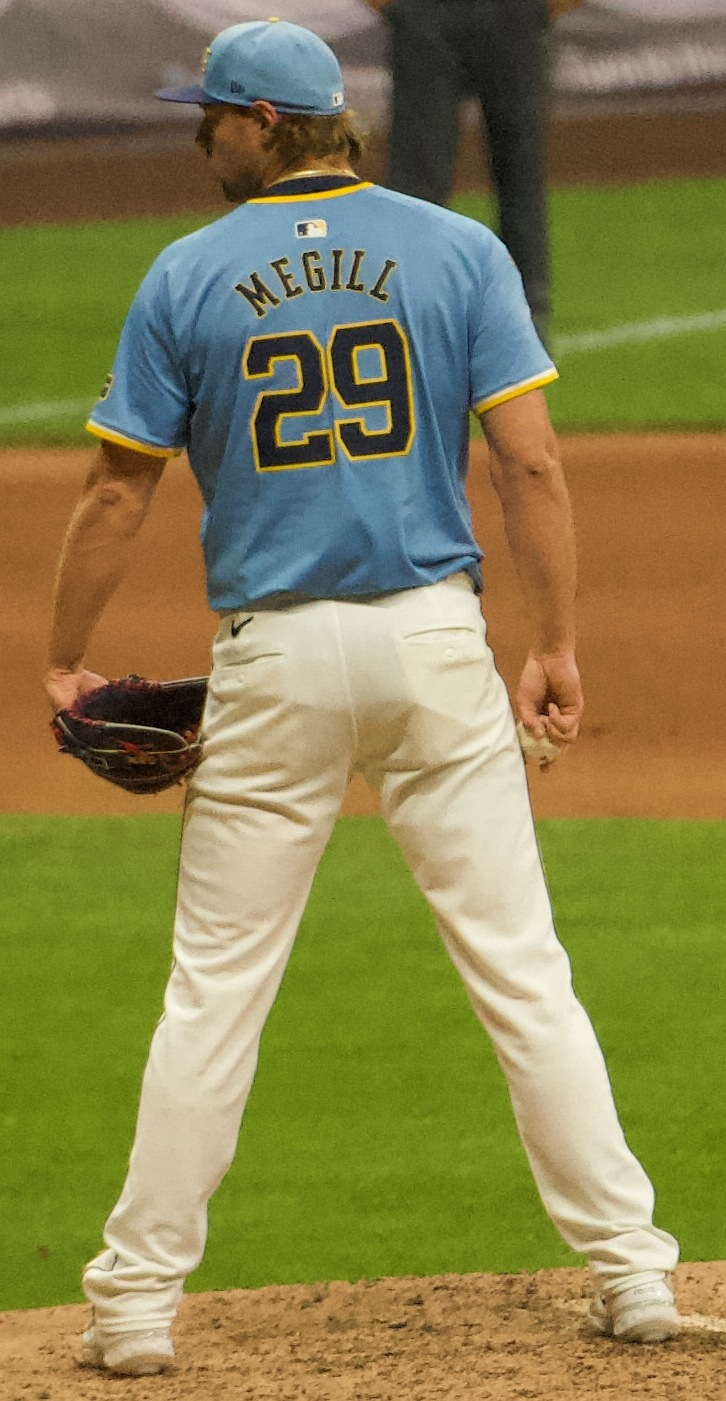
Trevor Megill pitched two innings to close out the game for the Brewers, clinching their first World Series.

October 28, 2026 8:08 pm (EDT) at Tropicana Field in St. Petersburg, Florida 72 °F (22 °C), Dome
Team	1	2	3	4	5	6	7	8	9	R	H	E
Milwaukee	0	1	0	0	1	2	0	0	0	4	8	2
Tampa Bay	0	0	0	0	0	0	0	0	1	1	4	0
WP: Jacob Misiorowski (2–0) LP: Drew Rasmussen (0–1); Attendance: 40,489; Boxscore

Singer-songwriter Julie Falcon performed the national anthem and longtime Rays television play-by-play announcer Dewayne Staats threw out the ceremonial first pitch. Jacob Misiorowski started Game 5 for Milwaukee and Drew Rasmussen started for Tampa Bay on short rest.

In the top of the second inning, Brice Turang hit a double, Sal Frelick was hit by a pitch, and Cooper Pratt hit an RBI single. In the bottom of the fourth inning, the Rays had runners on second and third base after Liam Hicks was hit by a pitch, Chandler Simpson singled, and Sal Frelick committed a throwing error, but Ben Williamson grounded out to end the inning. Rasmussen left the game after allowing one run in four innings.

With Kevin Kelly pitching in the top of the fifth inning, Pratt and Garrett Mitchell singled, and David Hamilton hit an RBI single. In the top of the sixth inning, the Brewers scored when Yelich was hit by a pitch and William Contreras hit an RBI double. Contreras advanced to third base on a single by Turang and scored on a sacrifice fly by Pratt. The sac fly snapped a six-plate appearance hit streak for the rookie shortstop Pratt, just one short of Billy Hatcher's record he set in the 1990 World Series. Misiorowski exited the game due to a cramp in his right calf after pitching 5 2/3 innings.

The Brewers turned to JoJo Romero, Abner Uribe, and Trevor Megill out of the bullpen. The Rays scored in the bottom of the ninth inning when Hicks and Simpson hit doubles, however, Megill induced Richie Palacios to ground out, concluding the game, series, and season, giving the Brewers their first championship in franchise history. The Brewers finished with a 114–61 overall record, the fourth-best combined record in MLB history. William Contreras was named the World Series MVP after hitting .381 with four RBIs, throwing out runners on four stolen base attempts, and going 10-for-13 on ABS challenges. Bob Uecker, the longtime Brewers announcer who died in January 2025, was mentioned many times throughout the World Series broadcast. Christian Yelich dedicated their World Series victory to him during the postgame trophy presentation.

The Brewers dominated the Rays in all aspects in this series. The Brewers outhit the Rays, 51–30, outhit them average-wise by nearly 100 points, .280 to .182, outscoring them 25–12, more than doubling Tampa's total run output, and the Brewers pitching staff held Tampa Bay to a .182 batting average along with a team ERA of 1.91 as opposed to a 4.89 ERA for Tampa, which is almost three more earned runs allowed per game.

=== Composite line score ===
2026 World Series (4–1): Milwaukee Brewers beat Tampa Bay Rays.

Team	1	2	3	4	5	6	7	8	9	10	11	12	R	H	E
Tampa Bay Rays	4	1	0	2	0	0	0	0	3	0	0	2	12	30	3
Milwaukee Brewers	4	1	2	2	10	3	2	0	0	0	0	1	25	51	5
Home runs: TB: Liam Hicks (1); MIL: Sal Frelick (1), David Hamilton (1), Cooper Pratt (1); Total attendance: 207,886 Average attendance: 41,577; Winning player's share: TBA Losing player's share: TBA

== Broadcasting ==
=== Television ===
==== United States ====
Fox televised the World Series in the United States for the 27th consecutive year. Fox Deportes had the Spanish telecast, and the series was streamed on Fox One. Play-by-play announcer Joe Davis, color analyst John Smoltz, and field reporters Ken Rosenthal and Tom Verducci called the series on Fox. Kevin Burkhardt hosted the network's pregame and postgame shows, with analysts Derek Jeter, David Ortiz, and Alex Rodriguez.

==== International ====
MLB International distributed a world television feed outside of the US, produced by MLB Network. Dave Flemming and Ryan Spilborghs provided the English-language play-by-play and analysis respectively.

===== Japan =====
In Japan, NHK televised the World Series for the 37th consecutive year, with Takashi Saito, Shuhei Takagi, and Keita Ito being the play-by-play announcers. Game 1 aired exclusively on NHK G and NHK BSP4K, while all remaining games were broadcast on NHK BS. Highlights of the games were presented on NHK One. The series aired on J Sports 3, with play-by-play announcers being Shunji Shimamura in Game 1, Ryuichi Kumagai in Game 2, Yuichi Setsumaru in Game 3, Kei Fukazawa in Game 4, and Yuji Kondo in Game 5. The series was also televised on pay television service SPOTV.

==== Ratings ====
The five games of the series were watched by an average of 11.83 million people in the United States, less than the per-game average of 2024 and 2025 and equal to or more than 2019–2023. Viewership numbers include Fox, Fox Deportes, and Univision (Game 1 only).

Game 1 reached 12.2 million viewers; Game 2, 10.85 million. Both were below the overall per-game averages of 2024 and 2025, but ahead of every World Series Game 1 and 2 of the 2020s, except for Game 2 of 2022.

Game 3 averaged 8.33 million viewers, making it the "fourth-least-watched World Series game ever," Awful Announcing reported, ahead only of 2023’s Game 3 and 4 and 2020’s Game 3.

Game 4 averaged 13.47 million viewers, surpassing Game 4 averages from 2019–2023. The decisive Game 5, a Brewers victory, reached 14.22 million viewers, peaking at 16.8 million viewers between 11:00-11:15 p.m. ET. It was the most watched Game 5 since 2019 and on par with 2025’s Game 5.

Game	Ratings (households)	U.S. English audience (in millions)	U.S. Spanish audience (in millions)	Japan audience (in millions)	Ref
1	TBA	12.26			
2	TBA	10.66			
3	TBA	8.33			
4	TBA	13.31			
5	TBA	14.22			

=== Radio ===
ESPN Radio aired the series in the United States for the 29th consecutive year. Play-by-play announcer Jon Sciambi, analysts Jessica Mendoza and Eduardo Pérez, and reporter Buster Olney called the series.

== Sponsorship and marketing ==
This was the fifth and final year under Capital One's deal to be the presenting sponsor of the World Series.

Controversy arose during the series when attendees who had purchased tickets through StubHub, a direct issuance ticketing partner of MLB, reported that their tickets to games one and two had "disappeared" and were listed as no longer available.

== Celebration ==
The World Series Parade in Milwaukee

On October 29, a group of Brewers players brought the Commissioner's Trophy to Lambeau Field in Green Bay, during the Packers' Thursday Night Football game against the Carolina Panthers. They brought the trophy onto the field after the first quarter, and Frelick was among those who performed a Lambeau Leap into the stands.

On October 30, schools of the Milwaukee Public Schools district were closed and the Brewers held a victory parade in downtown Milwaukee. It started at North 4th Street and West Wisconsin Avenue at 10 a.m. CT, headed east, and culminated at a rally at the American Family Insurance Amphitheater in Henry Maier Festival Park. Joining the parade and rally were 1982 Brewers players Robin Yount, Paul Molitor, Rollie Fingers, and Ted Simmons; and former Brewers players Ryan Braun and Eric Thames. VIP guests included the family of Bob Uecker, the late legendary Brewers broadcaster; and Bud Selig, the Brewers' original owner and former MLB commissioner. Rapper Foenem's viral song named after the Brewers played at the parade. Foenem's song, which was released a day after the playoffs began, became an unofficial anthem of the team during the postseason. The parade, which was expected to draw about 400,000 people, drew an estimated 750,000, more than Milwaukee's population of 556,000.

Murphy, Yelich, and Turang appeared on Saturday Night Live's Weekend Update segment on October 31.

== See also ==
- 2026 Japan Series
- 2026 Korean Series
- Milwaukee Brewers reverse World Series curse
