= Jackson Chourio =

Venezuelan baseball player (born 2004)

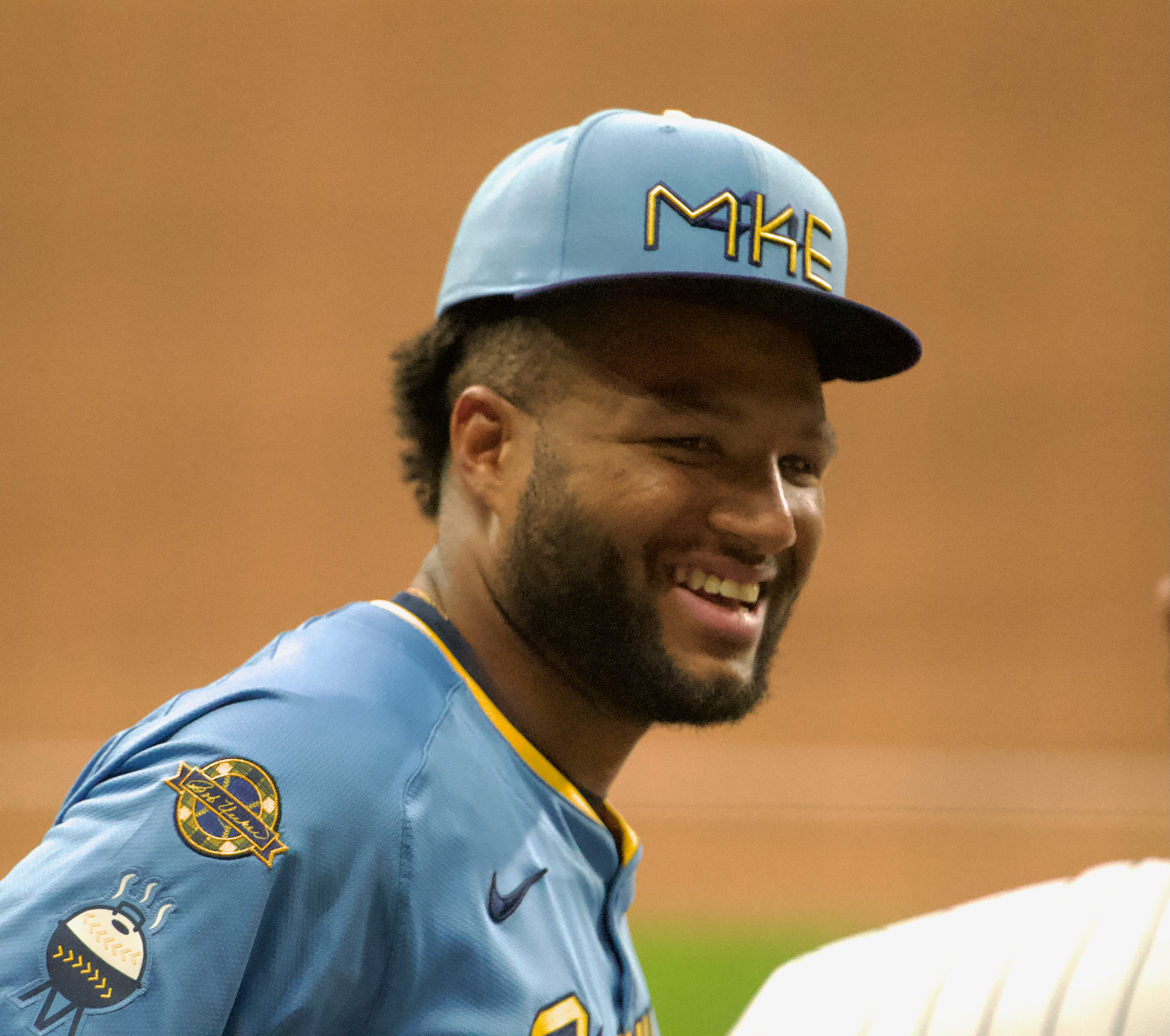
- Chourio with the Milwaukee Brewers in 2025

Milwaukee Brewers – No. 11
- Outfielder
- Born: March 11, 2004 (age 22); Maracaibo, Venezuela
- Bats: Right Throws: Right

MLB debut
- March 29, 2024, for the Milwaukee Brewers

MLB statistics (through 2026 season)
- Batting average: .278
- Home runs: 67
- Runs batted in: 232
- Stats at Baseball Reference

Teams
- Milwaukee Brewers (2024–present)

Career highlights and awards
- World Series champion (2026); All-MLB First Team (2026); Gold Glove Award (2026); Silver Slugger Award (2026)
Medals
Men's baseball
Representing Venezuela
World Baseball Classic
| Gold medal – first place | 2026 Miami | Team |

Jackson Bryan Chourio (born March 11, 2004) is a Venezuelan professional baseball outfielder for the Milwaukee Brewers of Major League Baseball (MLB). He made his MLB debut in 2024 and helped lead the Brewers to their first World Series championship in 2026.

== Early life ==
Chourio had a middle-class upbringing in Venezuela's second-most-populous city, Maracaibo. His father, who works for the Central Bank of Venezuela, is also named Jackson. His mother, AngelÍa, was an administrator before transitioning to being a stay-at-home mother. He is the second of four children.

Chourio has said that he played multiple sports well and believes that without baseball, he would have focused on basketball. He devoted his childhood time to school and sports, as well as playing video games with his siblings.

== Professional career ==
=== Minor leagues ===
Chourio had been on the Milwaukee Brewers' international scouting radar since he was 14 years old, and signed as an international free agent on January 15, 2021, with a $1.9 million signing bonus. He made his professional debut that season with the Dominican Summer League Brewers. During his first professional season, Chourio slashed .296/.386/.447 in 45 games, with five home runs and 25 RBIs.

Chourio began the 2022 season with the Single–A Carolina Mudcats, where he batted .324 (5th in the league)/.373/.600 (3rd) in 250 at bats, with 23 doubles (8th), 12 home runs (9th), and 10 stolen bases. He then played for the High–A Wisconsin Timber Rattlers, batting .252/.317/.488 in 127 at bats with eight home runs. He was promoted to the Class AA Biloxi Shuckers prior to the conclusion of the 2022 season. After the season, he was voted the Carolina League MVP and won the league's Top MLB Prospect Award. He was also named a 2022 MiLB Gold Glove as one of the three-best defensive outfielders in the minor leagues. He was the youngest player in Double-A in 2022. Across three classifications, Chourio slashed .288/.342/.538 with 20 home runs and 75 RBIs.

The Brewers assigned Chourio to Double-A Biloxi in 2023. Entering the season as baseball's sixth best prospect, Chourio became the highest-ranked Brewers prospect since Orlando Arcia in 2016. During the season, he was named baseball's top prospect by Baseball America. In June 2023, Chourio was selected to play in the All-Star Futures Game. In 122 games with the Shuckers, Chourio batted a slash of .280/.336/.467 with 22 home runs and 89 runs batted in, and stole 41 bases. Chourio became the first Double-A player to hit 20 home runs and steal 40 bases since 2005. In addition, his 89 RBI were a Biloxi single–season record. On September 18, 2023, Chourio was promoted to the Triple-A Nashville Sounds. In the 6 games he appeared with the Sounds, he batted a slash of .333/.375/.476 with 2 runs batted in.

=== Milwaukee Brewers ===
On December 4, 2023, the Brewers signed Chourio to an eight-year contract worth $82 million with club options for the 2032 and 2033 seasons. As of that date, it was the largest contract given to a player who had not reached the major leagues, surpassing Luis Robert Jr.'s six-year, $50 million contract from 2020.

==== 2024 season ====
Jackson Chourio's right-handed batting stance, pictured during his rookie season.

Chourio made his MLB debut on Opening Day of the 2024 season as the youngest player on any MLB roster. On April 3, 2024, Chourio hit his first career MLB home run off of Daniel Duarte against the Minnesota Twins. However, Chourio's first few months went poorly. At the beginning of June, he had a batting average of .207 and an on-base percentage near .250. Chourio then adjusted his approach and went on to bat .305 for the rest of the season, with an OPS of .888. On September 12, 2024, against the San Francisco Giants, Chourio hit an opposite-field home run off of Spencer Bivens for his 20th home run of the season, becoming the youngest player in MLB history (20 years, 185 days) to have a 20 home run-20 stolen base season, and joined Vada Pinson and Mike Trout as the only players to accomplish the feat in their age-20 season (both Pinson and Trout turned 21 before completing their 20-20 seasons). Chourio finished his rookie season hitting .275, with 21 home runs, 22 stolen bases, 80 runs scored, and 79 RBI's, finishing 3rd in the National League Rookie of the Year voting, behind Paul Skenes and Jackson Merrill.

In the 2024 National League Wild Card Series, Chourio hit two home runs in a single game against the New York Mets, one of which was a game-tying home run. The accomplishment made him the second-ever under-21-year-old player to accomplish that after Andruw Jones in the 1996 World Series. Chourio's first home run of the game, occurring in the first inning, also made him the youngest player to hit a leadoff home run in a postseason game. It was also the first time since Babe Ruth in the 1928 World Series where a player hit two game-tying home runs in a postseason series.

==== 2025 season ====
In 2025, Chourio had a 20-game hitting streak, from July 2 to July 27. During the streak, Chourio batted .392 with 7 doubles and 4 home runs, increasing his batting average from .250 to .276. Chourio missed significant playing time in August due to a lingering hamstring injury, limiting him to only 131 games played for the 2025 season. Chourio finished the season with a .270 average, 21 home runs, 88 runs scored, 78 RBIs, and 21 stolen bases.

In Game 1 of the 2025 National League Division Series (NLDS) against the Chicago Cubs, Chourio hit a leadoff double in the 1st inning to spark a 6-run Brewers rally, capping the rally himself with a 2-run single, giving him two hits in one inning. Chourio then hit an RBI infield single in the second inning but then left the game after reaggravating his injured hamstring, initially leaving his availability for the rest of the series in question; however, Chourio did not miss any games in the postseason. In Game 2, Chourio hit a 3-run home run in the 4th inning to solidify a 7–3 Brewers win. The Brewers won the series 3-2, with Chourio batting .389 with 1 home run and 6 RBIs. In the National League Championship Series (NLCS), he batted .200 in the series, hitting Milwaukee's only home run.

==== 2026 season ====
On March 26, 2026, Chourio was placed on the 10-day injured list due to a left hand fracture, which he sustained after getting hit by a pitch while playing for Venezuela en route to a winning gold medal in the 2026 World Baseball Classic. Chourio made his regular season debut on May 4.

On September 20, 2026, Chourio stole his 20th base of the season against the Baltimore Orioles. Along with his 24 home runs, Chourio became the first player in MLB history to have three 20-home-run, 20-stolen-base seasons before his 23rd birthday. Chourio finished his age-22 season with new career highs by batting .291 with 25 home runs, 75 RBIs, 23 stolen bases, and 96 runs scored, backed by a .337 batting average in September, accumulating 4.9 bWAR.

In Game 1 of the 2026 National League Division Series (NLDS) against the San Diego Padres, Chourio hit a game-tying, two-run home run in the third inning in their ultimate victory. The hit marked his fifth career postseason home run, setting a new Brewers franchise record in his 13th career playoff game.

In Game 2, Chourio hit a two-strike, two-out, two-run walk-off single against closer Mason Miller, giving the Brewers a 4–3 victory and a 2–0 series lead. This was the third postseason walk-off in franchise history, joining Nyjer Morgan in 2011 and Mike Moustakas in 2018. "Sometimes, I feel like I was born for these moments," he said after the game.

In Game 4, which the Brewers won to secure the franchise's fourth-ever Championship Series berth, Chourio collected his 17th career postseason RBI in his 16th playoff game. This tied him with Andruw Jones for the most postseason RBIs in MLB history by a player under the age of 23, a feat Jones reached in 45 games. He also surpassed Ryan Braun (16 RBIs in 27 games) to become the franchise leader in career postseason RBIs.

In Game 3 of the National League Championship Series against the Los Angeles Dodgers, Chourio hit a leadoff home run off Blake Snell on the very first pitch of the game, one year to the day after Chourio's leadoff home run on the very first pitch from Yoshinobu Yamamoto in 2025. The home run was the only extra-base hit and RBI that Chourio had in the NLCS, as he hit a meager .158 (3 hits in 19 at-bats) in the series. The Brewers still swept the Dodgers in four games, winning their first-ever National League pennant and making their first trip to the World Series since 1982.

In Game 3 of the 2026 World Series against the Tampa Bay Rays, Chourio became the first MLB player younger than 23 years old with four hits in a World Series game (including two hits in the 8-run fifth inning en route to a 10-1 win to put the Brewers one win away from their first-ever championship) since Joe Garagiola in 1946; the only others to record the feat were Freddie Lindstrom, Ty Cobb, and Donie Bush. The Brewers would go on to win the World Series in five games, the first championship in franchise history. After going 10-for-20 in the first four games, tying a Fall Classic record set by Babe Ruth in 1928, Chourio finished the Series hitting .458, with 11 total hits, 4 runs scored, 2 RBIs, and 3 stolen bases.

Chourio went on to win his first Gold Glove Award in left field, as well as a Silver Slugger Award, becoming the youngest player ever to win the World Series, Gold Glove, and Silver Slugger in one season.

== Personal life ==
Chourio's younger brother, Jaison, plays for the Cleveland Guardians organization.
