= Peralta (surname) =

Peralta (Spanish pronunciation: [peˈɾalta]) is a Spanish surname. It is also an Italian surname found in Sicily, Piedmont, and Tuscany.

The first time that this name appeared was during the Middle Age, when people started to take surnames related to their father's name, in this case, the Italian name Pietro.

This name has its origins in the Latin words pietra which means rock, and alta, which refers to being tall or big.

Notable people with the surname Peralta include:

- Abel Peralta (born 1989), Argentine footballer
- Alejo Peralta, Mexican businessman
- Alice Peralta (born 1990), Japanese voice actress
- Amanda Peralta (1939–2009), Argentine guerrilla fighter and academic
- Ángela Peralta (1845–1883), Mexican opera singer
- Arnold Peralta (1989–2015), Honduran footballer
- Austin Peralta (1990–2012), American jazz musician
- Chad Peralta (born 1985), Filipino-Australian singer and actor
- Chichí Peralta (born 1966), Dominican musician
- Carlos Peralta (businessman), Mexican businessman and baseball team owner
- Carlos Peralta (swimmer) (born 1994), Spanish swimmer
- Daniel Peralta (born 1955), Argentine politician
- David Peralta (born 1987), Venezuelan baseball player
- Davis Peralta (born 1948), Panamanian basketball player
- Diosdado Peralta (born 1952), Filipino attorney and jurist
- Domingo Peralta (born 1986), Dominican footballer
- Elda Peralta, Mexican film actress
- Eugenio Peralta (born 1977), Paraguayan footballer
- Felipe Peralta (born 1962), Paraguayan footballer
- Francisco Peralta (1943–2020), Spanish archer
- Freddy Peralta (born 1996), Dominican baseball player
- Gonzalo Peralta (born 1980), Argentine footballer
- Gregorio Peralta (1935–2001), Argentine boxer
- Guglielmo Peralta, Italian noble
- Hiro Peralta (born 1994), actor from the Philippines
- Horacio Peralta (born 1982), Uruguayan footballer
- Ignacio Peralta (1791–1874), Spanish settler in California
- Irma Peralta (born 1936), Mexican ceramist
- Isabel Peralta (born 2002), Spanish neo-Nazi
- Isaías Peralta (born 1987), Chilean footballer
- Jhonny Peralta (born 1982), Dominican baseball player
- Joel Peralta (born 1976), Dominican baseball player
- Jose Peralta (1971–2018), American politician
- José Francisco de Peralta (1786–1844), Costa Rican priest and politician
- Juan Peralta (born 1990), Spanish cyclist
- Julio Peralta (born 1981), Chilean tennis player
- Leonel Peralta (born 1992), Argentine footballer
- Luís María Peralta (1759–1851), soldier and owner of Rancho San Antonio
- Macario Peralta, Jr. (1913–1965), Filipino WWII guerrilla commander
- Marcelo Peralta (1961–2020), Argentine musician
- María Peralta (born 1977), Argentine runner
- María Teresa de Larraín y Guzmán Peralta (1785 – c. 1840), former First Lady of Chile and wife of President Agustín Eyzaguirre
- Marlo Peralta (born 1950), Filipino clergyman
- Martín Peralta (born 1997), Argentine footballer
- Nahuel Peralta (born 1991), Argentine footballer
- Oribe Peralta (born 1984), Mexican footballer
- Orlin Peralta (born 1990), Honduran footballer
- Osvaldo Peralta (born 1971), Paraguayan footballer
- Pedro de Peralta (about 1583–1659), Spanish governor of Santa Fé de Nuevo México (1609–1614)
- Rafael Peralta (1979–2004), U.S. Marine, recipient of the Navy Cross
- Rafael Peralta (rejoneador) (1933–2025), Spanish rejoneador
- Raúl Peralta (born 1940), Argentine-Portuguese tennis player
- Robbie Peralta (born 1986), American mixed martial artist
- Rodrigo Peralta (born 1988), Mexican racing driver
- Sammy Peralta (born 1998), American baseball player
- Sixto Peralta (born 1979), Argentine football player
- Stacy Peralta (born 1957), American director and former professional skateboarder
- Víctor Peralta (disambiguation), multiple people
- Wandy Peralta (born 1991), Dominican baseball player
- Wily Peralta (born 1989), Dominican baseball player
- Yamil Peralta (born 1991), Argentinian boxer

== Fictional ==
- Jake Peralta, lead character on the American television series Brooklyn Nine-Nine
