= Tampa Bay Rays award winners and league leaders =

This is a list of award winners and league leaders for the Tampa Bay Rays professional baseball team.

== Regular season award winners ==
=== Cy Young Award ===
- David Price (2012)
- Blake Snell (2018)

=== Rookie of the Year ===
- Evan Longoria (2008)
- Jeremy Hellickson (2011)
- Wil Myers (2013)
- Randy Arozarena (2021)

=== Mariano Rivera AL Reliever of the Year Award ===
- Bryan Baker (2026)

=== Gold Glove Award ===
- Carlos Peña, 1B (2008)
- Evan Longoria, 3B (2009, 2010, 2017)
- Carl Crawford, LF (2010)
- Jeremy Hellickson, P (2012)
- Kevin Kiermaier, CF (2015 [Platinum Glove] , 2016, 2019)
- Taylor Walls, SS (2026)

=== Wilson Defensive Player of the Year Award ===
See explanatory note at Atlanta Braves award winners and league leaders.
Team (at all positions)

- (2012)
- (2013)

=== Silver Slugger Award ===
- Carlos Peña, 1B (2007)
- Evan Longoria, 3B (2009)
- Carl Crawford, OF (2010)
- Yandy Díaz, 1B (2023)
- Junior Caminero, 3B (2026)

=== All-MLB Team ===
==== First team ====
- Nick Anderson, RP (2020)
- Junior Caminero, 3B (2026)

==== Second team ====
- Charlie Morton, SP (2019)
- Brandon Lowe, 2B (2020)
- Junior Caminero, 3B (2025)
- Drew Rasmussen, SP (2026)
- Bryan Baker, RP (2026)

=== Comeback Player of the Year ===
- Carlos Peña (2007)
- Fernando Rodney (2012)

=== Manager of the Year ===
See footnote

- Joe Maddon (2008, 2011)
- Kevin Cash (2020, 2021)

=== Roberto Clemente Award ===
- Nelson Cruz (2021)

=== MLB "This Year in Baseball Awards" ===
Note: These awards were renamed the "GIBBY Awards" (Greatness in Baseball Yearly) in 2010 and then the "Esurance MLB Awards" in 2015.

==== "Esurance MLB Awards" Best Defensive Player ====
- Kevin Kiermaier (2015)

=== DHL Hometown Heroes (2006) ===
- Wade Boggs — voted by MLB fans as the most outstanding player in the history of the franchise, based on on-field performance, leadership quality, and character value.

=== Baseball America Rookie of the Year ===
- Jeremy Hellickson (2011)

=== Baseball America All-Rookie Team ===
See: Baseball America#Baseball America All-Rookie Team

- 2011 – Desmond Jennings (OF; one of three) and Jeremy Hellickson (SP; one of five)

=== Tony Conigliaro Award ===
- Rocco Baldelli (2008)

=== Baseball America Manager of the Year ===
See: Baseball America#Baseball America Manager of the Year
See footnote

- Joe Maddon (2011)

=== USA Today AL Top Manager ===
- Joe Maddon (2011)

=== Baseball Prospectus AL Manager of the Year ===
- Joe Maddon (2011)

=== Chuck Tanner Major League Baseball Manager of the Year Award ===
See footnote

- Joe Maddon (2008)

=== Sporting News Manager of the Year Award ===
- Joe Maddon (2008, 2011)
- Kevin Cash (2019, 2020)

== Postseason and All-Star Game MVP award winners ==
=== American League Championship Series MVP ===
See: League Championship Series Most Valuable Player Award#American League winners

- Matt Garza (2008)
- Randy Arozarena (2020)
- Freddy Peralta (2026)

=== All-Star Game MVP ===
- Carl Crawford (2009)

== Team awards ==
- 2008, 2020 – William Harridge Trophy (American League champion)
- 2008 – Baseball America Organization of the Year

== Minor-league system ==
=== Baseball America Minor League Player of the Year Award ===
- Rocco Baldelli (2002)
- Delmon Young (2005)
- Jeremy Hellickson (2010)

=== TOPPS Minor League Player of the Year ===
See footnote and Topps#Awards

- Delmon Young (2005)
- Matt Moore (2011)

=== USA Today Minor League Player of the Year Award ===
- Josh Hamilton (2000)
- David Price (2008)
- Jeremy Hellickson (2010)

=== Joe Bauman Home Run Award ===
- Kevin Witt, Durham Bulls (2006)

== Other achievements ==
=== National Baseball Hall of Fame ===
See: Tampa Bay Rays#Baseball Hall of Famers

=== Rays Hall of Fame ===
See: Tampa Bay Rays#Tampa Bay Rays Hall of Fame

=== Retired numbers ===
See: Tampa Bay Rays#Retired numbers

== See also ==
- Ted Williams Museum and Hitters Hall of Fame (including Tampa Bay Rays exhibit)
- Baseball awards
- List of Major League Baseball awards
