= Jett Williams (baseball) =

American baseball player (born 2003)

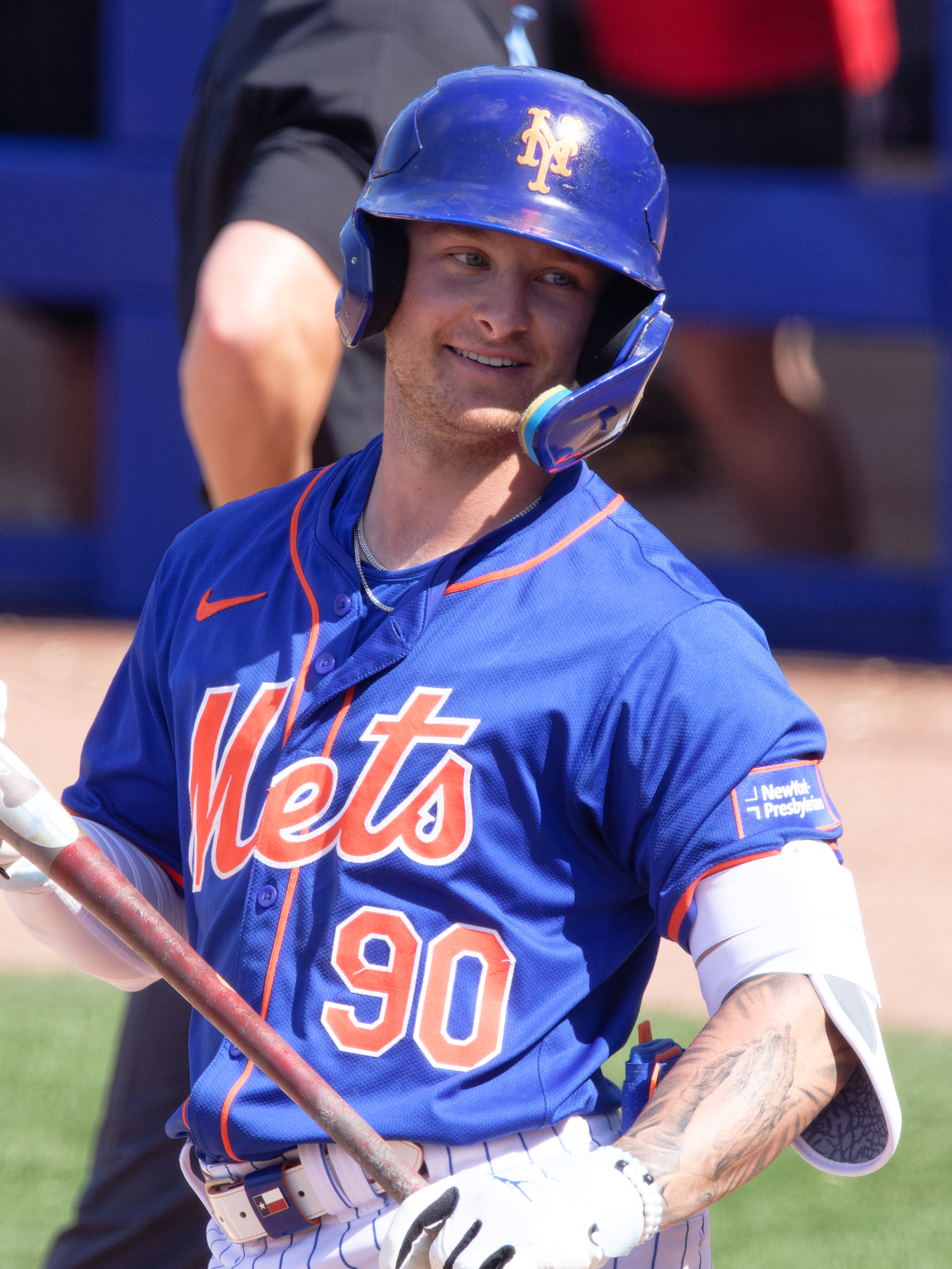
- Williams with the Mets in 2024

Milwaukee Brewers
- Shortstop / Center fielder
- Born: November 3, 2003 (age 23); Dallas, Texas, U.S.
- Bats: Right Throws: Right
- Stats at Baseball Reference

Jett Michael Williams (born November 3, 2003) is an American professional baseball shortstop and center fielder for the Milwaukee Brewers of Major League Baseball (MLB).

== Amateur career ==
Williams attended Rockwall-Heath High School in Heath, Texas, where he played baseball. As a junior in 2021, he batted .347 with five home runs and 38 RBI. During his senior season in 2022, he hit .411 with seven home runs, 41 RBI, and ten doubles. He was named District 10-6A Offensive MVP and ended the season as a top prospect for the upcoming draft. The Dallas Morning News named him their Offensive Player of the Year. Williams originally committed to play college baseball at Texas A&M University, but switched to Mississippi State University.

== Professional career ==
=== New York Mets ===
The New York Mets selected Williams in the first round with the 14th overall selection of the 2022 Major League Baseball draft. He signed with the team for $3.9 million. At 5 feet 6 inches (1.68 m), Williams is the shortest player ever selected in the first round since the MLB Draft's inaugural year in 1965.

Williams made his professional debut after signing with the Rookie-level Florida Complex League Mets, batting .250 with one home run and six RBI over ten games. To open the 2023 season, Williams was assigned to the St. Lucie Mets of the Single-A Florida State League. In late July, he was promoted to the Brooklyn Cyclones of the High-A South Atlantic League. In late September, he was promoted to the Binghamton Rumble Ponies of the Double-A Eastern League with whom he played in six games. Over 121 games between the three teams, Williams slashed .263/.425/.451 with 13 home runs, 55 RBI, and 45 stolen bases.

Williams was assigned back to Binghamton to open the 2024 season. He missed most of the season due to a wrist injury which he suffered in April and which required surgery in June. He struggled in both Single-A St. Lucie and Double-A Binghamton in 26 games, managing a batting average of just .190. At the end of the Double-A season, however, he was promoted to the Syracuse Mets of the Triple-A International League. His totals over 33 games between the three teams included a .215 batting average, five stolen bases, four RBI, and eight doubles. After the season, he was assigned to play in the Arizona Fall League with the Scottsdale Scorpions.

Williams was assigned to Binghamton to open the 2025 season. In August, he was promoted to Syracuse. Over 130 games between both affiliates, Williams hit .261 with 17 home runs, 52 RBI, 34 doubles, and 34 stolen bases.

=== Milwaukee Brewers ===
On January 21, 2026, the Mets traded Williams and Brandon Sproat to the Milwaukee Brewers in exchange for Freddy Peralta and Tobias Myers. Williams was assigned to the Nashville Sounds of the Triple-A International League. He missed time during the season due to elbow and wrist injuries. Across 81 games, Williams hit .233 with nine home runs, 41 RBI, and 21 stolen bases. After the season, the Brewers added him to their 40-man roster to protect him from the Rule 5 draft.
