= Brandon Sproat =

American baseball player (born 2000)

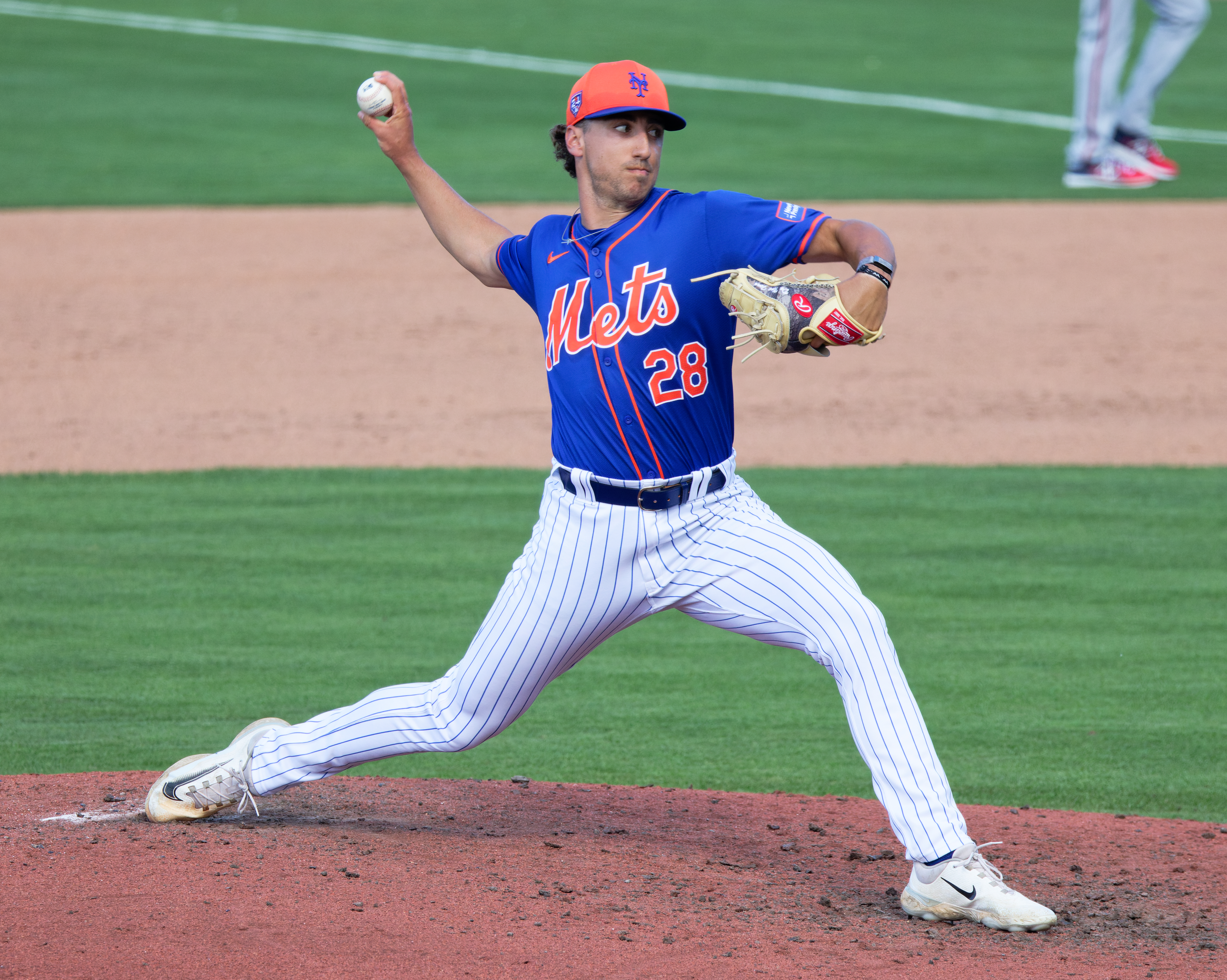
- Sproat with the Mets in 2024

Milwaukee Brewers – No. 23
- Pitcher
- Born: September 17, 2000 (age 26); Pensacola, Florida, U.S.
- Bats: Right Throws: Right

MLB debut
- September 7, 2025, for the New York Mets

MLB statistics (through 2026 season)
- Win–loss record: 3–9
- Earned run average: 5.43
- Strikeouts: 118
- Stats at Baseball Reference

Teams
- New York Mets (2025); Milwaukee Brewers (2026–present)

Brandon Carl Sproat (born September 17, 2000) is an American professional baseball pitcher for the Milwaukee Brewers of Major League Baseball (MLB). He played college baseball for the Florida Gators and was selected by the New York Mets in the second round of the 2023 MLB draft. He made his MLB debut in 2025.

== Amateur career ==
The drafted Sproat out of Sprout attended Pace High School in Pace, Florida. The Texas Rangers selected him in the seventh round of the 2019 Major League Baseball draft. Sproat did not sign with Texas and attended the University of Florida, where he played college baseball for the Florida Gators. In 2021, he played collegiate summer baseball with the Chatham Anglers of the Cape Cod Baseball League.

In 2022, Sproat pitched 106 1/3 innings, while recording a 9-4 record, and a 3.41 ERA, while striking out 134 batters. For his performance he was named second-team All-SEC. Sproat was drafted by the New York Mets in the 3rd round of the 2022 Major League Baseball draft, but did not sign and returned to Florida. However in 2023, Sproat somewhat struggled after pitching to a 4.66 ERA.

== Professional career ==
=== New York Mets ===
The New York Mets selected Sproat in the second round, with the 56th overall selection, of the 2023 Major League Baseball draft; he signed with the Mets on July 14, 2023.

On July 2, 2024, Sproat was announced to be on the roster for the 2024 All-Star Futures Game. In his first professional season, he compiled a 7-4 record and 3.40 ERA with 131 strikeouts in 116 1/3 innings pitched; his 24 appearances (23 starts) were split between the High-A Brooklyn Cyclones, Double-A Binghamton Rumble Ponies, and Triple-A Syracuse Mets. Following the season, Sproat was selected as New York's Minor League Player of the Year.

Sproat began the 2025 season with the Triple-A Syracuse Mets, where he posted an 8-6 record and 4.24 ERA with 113 strikeouts across 26 appearances (25 starts). On September 7, 2025, the Mets selected Sproat's contract, adding him to their active roster. He debuted the same day as the starting pitcher against the Cincinnati Reds, pitching six innings and striking out seven in a 2–3 loss. Sproat made four starts for New York during his rookie campaign, posting an 0-2 record and 4.79 ERA with 17 strikeouts across 20 2/3 innings pitched.

=== Milwaukee Brewers ===
On January 21, 2026, the Mets traded Sproat and Jett Williams to the Milwaukee Brewers in exchange for Freddy Peralta and Tobias Myers. On May 13, he recorded his first career win, allowing three runs over 5 1/3 innings against the San Diego Padres. On June 23, Sproat logged a career–high 10 strikeouts and six scoreless innings during a 2–0 victory over the Cincinnati Reds. On August 4, the Brewers optioned Sproat to the Triple-A Nashville Sounds after a game against the Pittsburgh Pirates where Sproat pitched three innings, allowed five hits and four earned runs, walked two batters, and struck out four. Sproat's season ERA at the time was 5.27 with a record of 3–7. He pitched the first three innings of a no-hitter against the Norfolk Tides on August 23, striking out five batters, as part of a seven-inning doubleheader. He was relieved by Tate Kuehner, who closed out the 2–0 Nashville win.
