= Geles Cabrera =

Mexican sculptor (1926–2026)

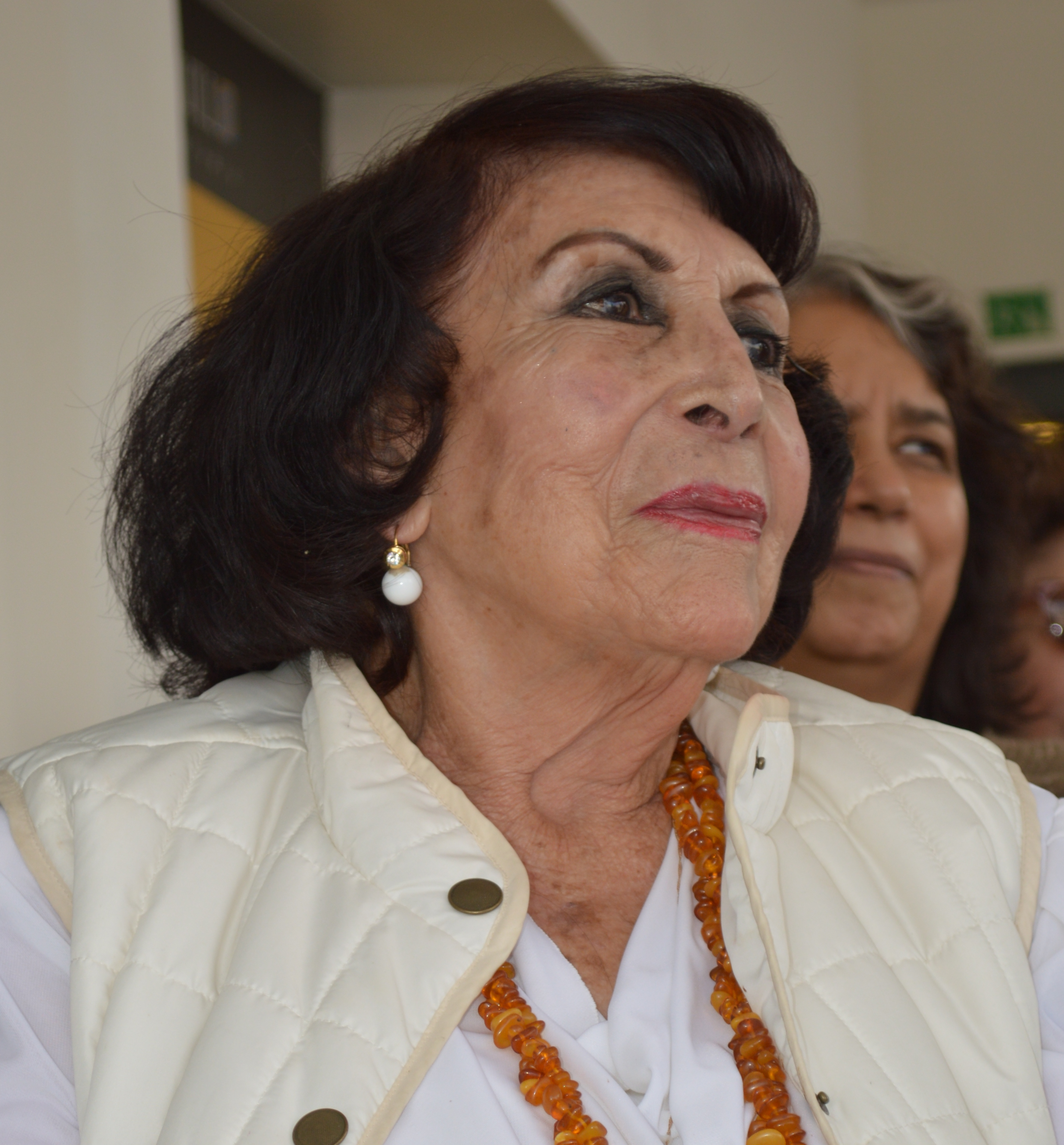
- Cabrera at a book presentation for the Salón de la Plástica Mexicana at the Museo del Estanquillo, November 2014.
- Born: Ángeles María Cabrera Alvarado; 2 August 1926; Mexico City, Mexico
- Died: 1 September 2026 (aged 100)
- Education: Academy of San Carlos; San Alejandro Academy; La Esmeralda
- Occupations: Sculptor; Teacher; Museum director
- Organizations: Museo Escultórico Geles Cabrera
- Awards: Medal for Fine Arts

Ángeles María Cabrera Alvarado (Note: In this Mexican name, the surname is Cabrera and the second or maternal family name is Alvarado.) (2 August 1926 – 1 September 2026) was a Mexican sculptor who worked in a variety of materials, with a focus on the female body. Her signature material was black or gray volcanic stone.

Cabrera studied sculpture in Mexico City and in Havana, Cuba, and also studied classical, folk and experimental dance. The suggestion of movements became part of her art. She also worked as a teacher. She later turned to collaborative projects in public space. In 1966 she founded a sculpture museum in Coyoacán, that is now named after her, Museo Escultórico Geles Cabrera, and holds several of her works. Cabrera is regarded as Mexico's first professional woman sculptor.

== Life and career ==
Geles Cabrera was born in Mexico City on 2 August 1926, to Salvador Cabrera and Jovita Alvarado. Her father was a civil engineer and the owner of a factory that made papier-mâché decorations in an art-nouveau style for upper-class homes. When overseeing new building projects in Mexico City, he was involved when Pre-Columbian artworks were found.

Her interest in art began at a young age and was encouraged by the family. Cabrera's interests included music as well as visual art, studying both dance and visual arts. From 1943 to 1947, she studied mornings at the Academy of San Carlos, and in the afternoons/evenings, she studied classical and folk dance at the Escuela de Danza and experimental dance with Alfonso Pallares. In 1947, her father had to close the factory and the family moved to Cuba, where he worked building bridges. She continued her art studies in Cuba at Havana's San Alejandro Academy, where she met Wifredo Lam. In 1948 and 1949, she won second, then first place at the Salón de Bellas Artes in Havana.

The family returned to Mexico in 1949, and Cabrera enrolled at the National School of Painting, Sculpture and Printmaking "La Esmeralda". During this time, movie actress Dolores del Río decided to pose for a select group of students, with Cabrera being one. The artist created a bust that pleased the actress's mother and which accompanied Del Río during her career.

=== Career ===
Cabrera had her first individual exhibition at the Mont Orendaín Gallery (Colonia Roma) in 1949, a progressive gallery. Paul Westheim, commenting about the exhibition, said, "Lehmbruck, Brancusi, Lipschitz, Moore: Geles has placed herself among them."

Over the course of her career, Cabrera had over 22 individual exhibitions and participated in over 50 collective ones. These include two exhibits in 2009 in the Coyoacán metro station (Line 3) and in the Botanical Garden of the National Autonomous University of Mexico (UNAM). She published three books, and in 1971 was a founding member of the GUCADIGO collective (later, GADIGOSE) along with Ángela Gurría, Juan Luis Díaz, Mathias Goeritz; the sculptor Sebastián joined later. The aim of the group was to make three dimensional work within an urban setting. One of their projects, commissioned by President Luis Echeverría, was a series of five sculptures placed on roundabouts along the ringroad of Villahermosa, Tabasco, all of which have since been demolished. Later the group became BACADIGUGOSETA, with the addition of Herbert Bayer and Rufino Tamayo, for the 1979 exhibition Siete monedas de oro, featuring "the smallest sculptures in the world".

She received awards and other recognition in Mexico and abroad, in countries such as Belgium, Bulgaria, the United States, Cuba and Israel. Her work has been written about by critics such as Paul Westheim, Margarita Nelken, Antonio Rodríguez, María Luisa Mendoza, Raquel Tibol and Makario Matus. In 1949, she received first prize in the thirty-first Fine Arts Salon of Havana and, in 1985, she was granted first prize in sculpture in Gabrovo, Bulgaria. She was invited to become a member of the Salón de la Plástica Mexicana in 1949, and she appeared in the documentary Escultura es cultura, along with Feliciano Bejar, Pedro Cervantes, Antonio Nava and others.

Cabrera dedicated 37 years to teaching art in the José Vasconcelos National Preparatory School No. 5, part of the National Autonomous University of Mexico. Examples of her work can be found in the Geles Cabrera Sculpture Museum of Art in Coyoacán, Mexico City. Ceramist Irma Peralta was among her pupils.

A documentary of her life and work was made in 2018 by Pedro Reyes. She received the Medal for Fine Arts, the highest honour for lifetime achievements in Mexico, in 2023. A retrospective at the Museo del Palacio de Bellas Artes was dedicated to her work in 2025, entitled Partituras corporales.

=== Personal life ===
Cabrera married physician Rafael Cano, who supported her work during their 65 years of marriage. The couple had five children.

Cabrera died on 1 September 2026 in Mexico City, at the age of 100.

== Work ==
Cabrera's sculptures focus on the female body in modular shapes. Common themes include love, loneliness and being a mother. Her work was also inspired by the experimental dance that she had studied. First working in clay, metal and stone based on prehistoric art, she used clear lines to emphasize the human form's eroticism. She experimented with a variety of materials, including wood, plant fibers and bronze. Her signature material was black or gray volcanic stone, as it is also used in indigenous building. She liked its "raw dimension", leaving it unpolished.

Cabrera gave her sculptures gestural poses, textures, and the suggestion of movements. She later also turned to large collaborative art projects for public spaces and used plexiglass, papier-mâché and newspaper as materials.

== Museo Escultórico Geles Cabrera ==
In 1966 she founded a free museum for sculpture called the Museo Escultórico, next to her husband's clinic. She maintained this museum for forty years with her earnings from teaching. She meant it to present works by other artists, but it evolved into an exhibition of more than 50 sculptures by her. Cabrera described the museum as "the communication of art and sculpture to the people, to the community. Here there are no signs that say 'don't touch'." One of the touchable sculptures is a swing, which when ridden produces a human heartbeat. Admission to the museum was free.

Cabrera operated the museum until 2006. Today it is the Museo Escultórico Geles Cabrera, a museum dedicated to sculpture from the Americas, but it is little known. It contains a permanent collection of Mexican sculpture in various materials including sixty pieces by Cabrera from 1948. Many of the museum's visitors are school children. Pieces from the collection were exhibited in New York City in 2022, by the Americas Society.

== Awards ==
- 1949 : First Prize, Fine Arts Salon of Havana, Cuba.
- 1985 : Kiter Peter Sculpture Grand Prize, Biennale of Humor and Satire, Gabrovo, Bulgaria.
- 2024 : Gold Medal of Fine Arts in Visual Arts (2023 edition), Mexico.
