= Tobias Myers =

American baseball player (born 1998)

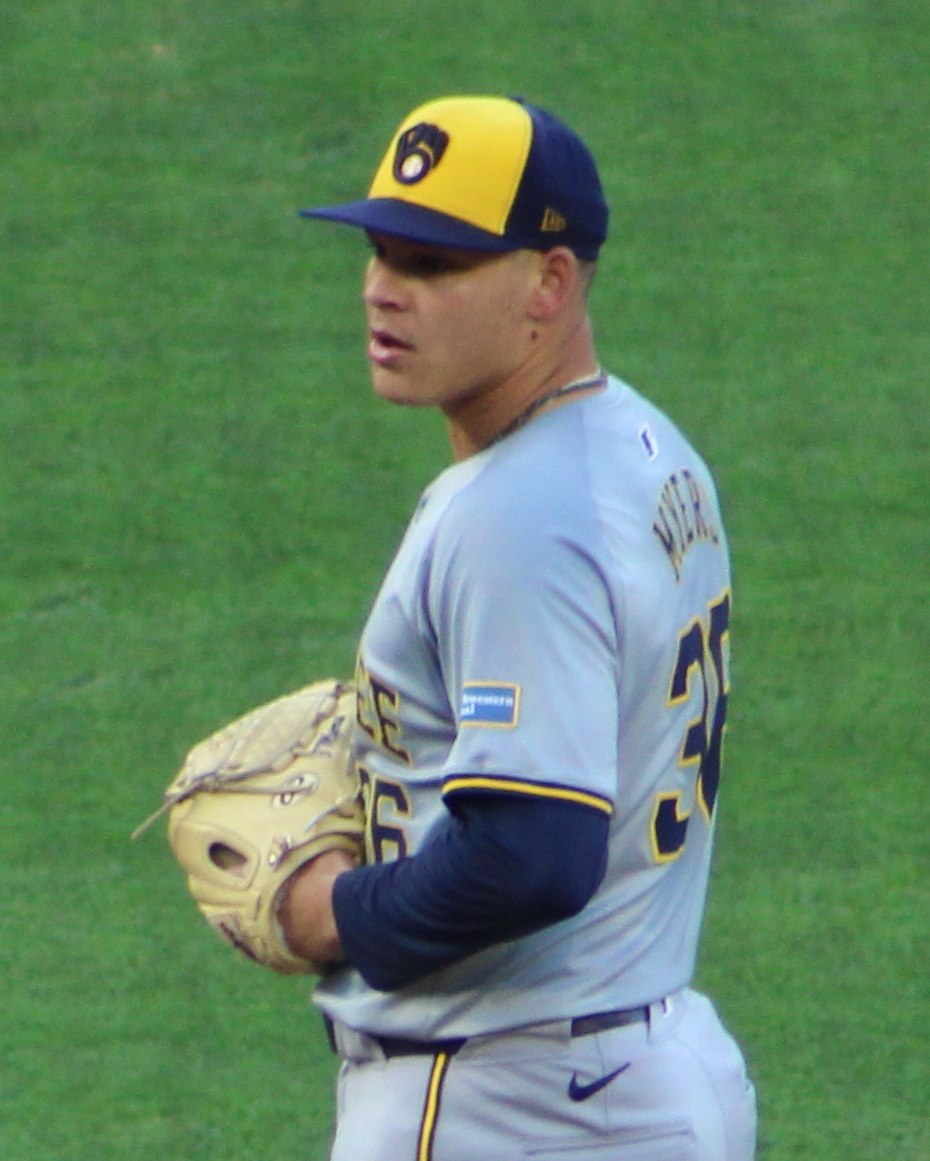
- Myers with the Milwaukee Brewers in 2024

New York Mets – No. 32
- Pitcher
- Born: August 5, 1998 (age 28); Winter Haven, Florida, U.S.
- Bats: Right Throws: Right

MLB debut
- April 23, 2024, for the Milwaukee Brewers

MLB statistics (through 2026 season)
- Win-loss record: 11–10
- Earned run average: 3.68
- Strikeouts: 206
- Stats at Baseball Reference

Teams
- Milwaukee Brewers (2024–2025); New York Mets (2026–present)

Tobias Kane Myers (born August 5, 1998) is an American professional baseball pitcher for the New York Mets of Major League Baseball (MLB). He has previously played in MLB for the Milwaukee Brewers. He made his MLB debut in 2024. Myers was selected by the Baltimore Orioles in the sixth round of the 2016 MLB draft.

== Amateur career ==
Myers attended Winter Haven High School in Winter Haven, Florida. In 2016, as a senior, he went 8–2 with a 1.51 earned run average (ERA), striking out 79 batters in 69 2/3 innings pitched. He signed to play college baseball at the University of South Florida.

== Professional career ==
=== Baltimore Orioles ===
The Baltimore Orioles selected Myers in the sixth round of the 2016 Major League Baseball draft. He signed with Baltimore for $225,000, forgoing his commitment to USF. Myers made his professional debut with the Rookie-level Gulf Coast League Orioles, compiling a 4.70 ERA in three starts. He began 2017 with the Aberdeen IronBirds of the Low–A New York–Penn League.

=== Tampa Bay Rays ===
On July 31, 2017, Myers was traded to the Tampa Bay Rays in exchange for Tim Beckham. He was assigned to the Hudson Valley Renegades of the Low–A New York–Penn League, where he finished the season. Over 12 starts between Aberdeen and Hudson Valley, he went 4–2 with a 3.54 ERA and a 0.98 WHIP. Myers spent 2018 with the Bowling Green Hot Rods of the Single–A Midwest League. He pitched to a 10–6 record with a 3.71 earned run average in 23 games (21 starts).

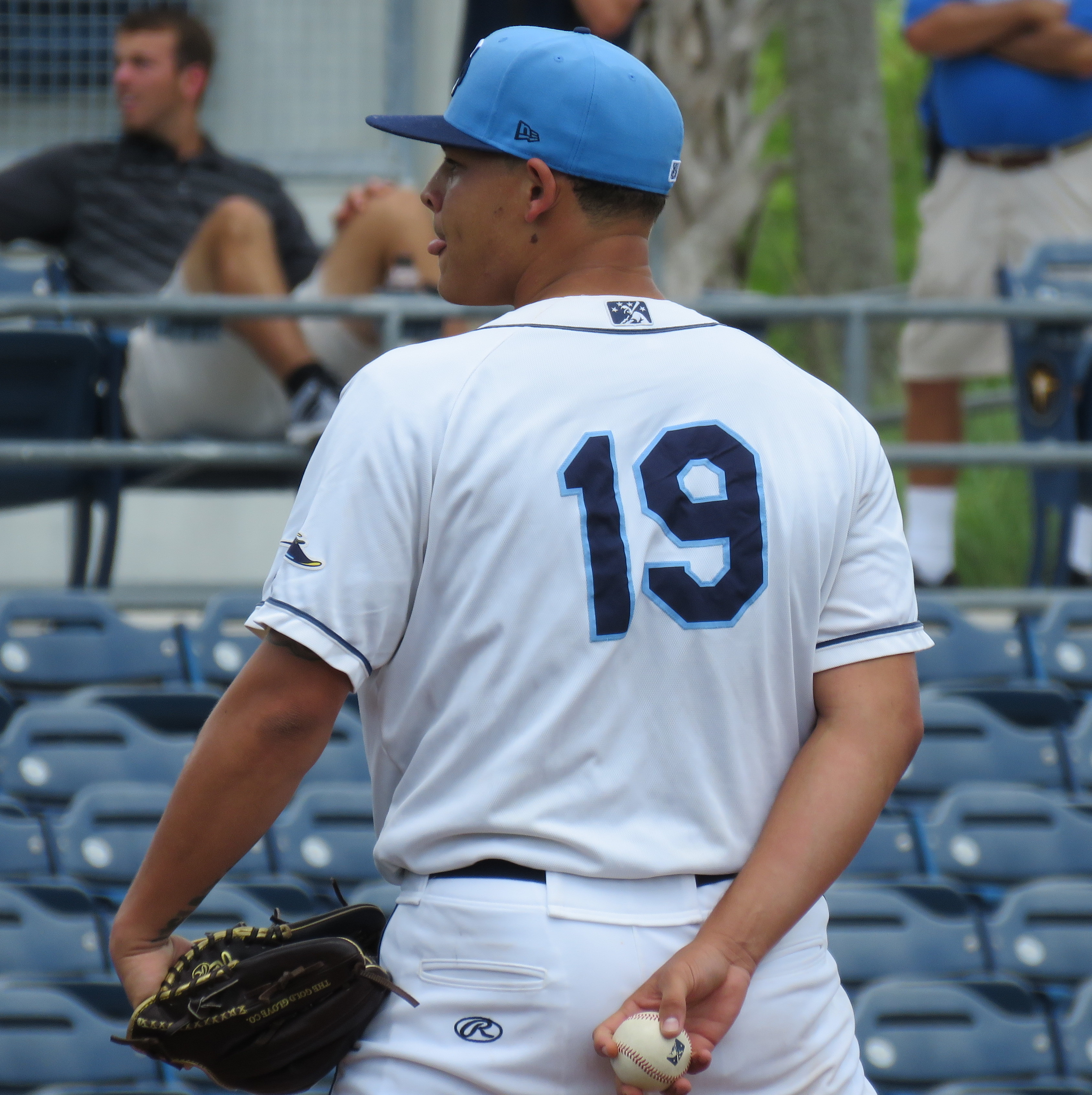
Myers with the Charlotte Stone Crabs in 2019

He spent 2019 with the Charlotte Stone Crabs of the High–A Florida State League, going 8–1 with a 2.31 ERA over 18 games (13 starts), striking out 59 over 84 2/3 innings. Myers did not play in a game in 2020 due to the cancellation of the minor league season because of the COVID-19 pandemic.

To begin the 2021 season, he was assigned to the Montgomery Biscuits of the Double-A South. After appearing in 13 games (ten starts) and pitching to a 5–3 record with a 3.32 ERA and 81 strikeouts over 59 2/3 innings, he was promoted to the Durham Bulls of the Triple-A East in July. Over 12 starts with Durham, Myers went 3–4 with a 4.50 ERA and 65 strikeouts over 58 innings.

=== Cleveland Guardians ===
On November 19, 2021, Myers was traded to the Cleveland Guardians in exchange for Junior Caminero; the Guardians selected Myers to their 40-man roster upon acquiring him. He was assigned to the Columbus Clippers of the Triple-A International League to begin the 2022 season, with whom he was 1–9 with a 6.00 ERA over 14 starts. On July 2, 2022, Myers was designated for assignment by the Guardians.

=== San Francisco Giants ===
On July 7, 2022, the Guardians traded Myers to the San Francisco Giants in exchange for cash considerations. He made two appearances for the Triple-A Sacramento River Cats of the Pacific Coast League, allowing three runs in as many innings pitched. He was designated for assignment on July 31 following the acquisition of Dixon Machado.

=== Chicago White Sox ===
On August 2, 2022, Myers was claimed off waivers by the Chicago White Sox. The White Sox assigned him to the Charlotte Knights of the Triple-A International League with whom he started seven games and had a 0-6 record and 15.92 ERA across 13 innings. On September 19, the White Sox released Myers. His minor league totals in 2022 included a 1–15 record with a 7.82 ERA in 76 innings, and he was second in the minor leagues in losses.

=== Milwaukee Brewers ===
On November 22, 2022, Myers signed a minor league contract with the Milwaukee Brewers organization and was assigned to the Triple-A Nashville Sounds. He split the 2023 season between the Double–A Biloxi Shuckers and Triple–A Nashville. In 29 games (26 starts), he accumulated a 10–5 record and 4.93 ERA with 175 strikeouts across 140 2/3 innings pitched.

On April 17, 2024, Myers was selected to the 40–man roster and promoted to the major leagues for the first time. However, he was optioned down to Nashville the following day without appearing for the Brewers, becoming a phantom ballplayer. On April 22, Myers was recalled to the majors after Wade Miley was placed on the injured list. Myers made his Major League debut on April 23 versus the Pittsburgh Pirates, surrendering a home run to Andrew McCutchen on his first pitch. Myers made 27 appearances (25 starts) for the Brewers during his rookie campaign, compiling a 9-6 record and 3.00 ERA with 127 strikeouts over 138 innings of work.

Myers pitched in 22 games (including six starts) for Milwaukee during the 2025 season, accumulating a 1-2 record and 3.55 ERA with 38 strikeouts across 50 2/3 innings pitched.

=== New York Mets ===
On January 21, 2026, the Brewers traded Myers and Freddy Peralta to the New York Mets in exchange for Jett Williams and Brandon Sproat.

== Personal life ==
Myers and his wife, Leah, were married in December 2024.
