= 2025 National League Championship Series =

| Team (Wins) | Managers | Season |
|---|---|---|
| Los Angeles Dodgers (4) | Dave Roberts | 93–69 (.574), GA: 3 |
| Milwaukee Brewers (0) | Pat Murphy | 97–65 (.599), GA: 5 |
- Dates: October 13–17
- MVP: Shohei Ohtani (Los Angeles)
- Umpires: Adam Beck, Vic Carapazza, Chad Fairchild, James Hoye (crew chief), John Libka, Gabe Morales, Mark Ripperger

Broadcast
- Television: TBS; TruTV; HBO Max (streaming); UniMás (Spanish); Vix (Spanish – streaming)
- TV announcers: Brian Anderson, Ron Darling, Jeff Francoeur, and Lauren Shehadi
- Radio: ESPN
- Radio announcers: Jon Sciambi and Doug Glanville
- NLDS: Milwaukee Brewers over Chicago Cubs (3–2); Los Angeles Dodgers over Philadelphia Phillies (3–1)

The 2025 National League Championship Series (NLCS) was the best-of-seven playoff in Major League Baseball's 2025 postseason between the overall #1 seed Milwaukee Brewers and the defending World Series champion and third-seeded Los Angeles Dodgers for the National League (NL) pennant and the right to play in the 2025 World Series. The series began on October 13 and ended on October 17. The Dodgers won the series in a four-game sweep to become National League (NL) champions and advance to the World Series for the second consecutive year. Two-way player Shohei Ohtani won the NLCS MVP for his three-home-run, six-innings-pitched, no-runs-allowed, ten-strikeout performance in Game 4 to secure the sweep. This was the first sweep in an NLCS since 2019.

The Dodgers gave up just four runs in the series (one run each game), and the Brewers hit .118, the lowest ever batting average of any team in the postseason in a series of at least three games.

The games were televised on TBS and TruTV, and streamed on HBO Max in the United States. UniMás broadcast the series in Spanish. The Brewers returned the favor the next year by sweeping the Dodgers in the NLCS to advance to the 2026 World Series.

In the 2025 World Series, the Dodgers defeated the American League champion Toronto Blue Jays in seven games to repeat as World Series champions.

== Background ==
This was the first National League Championship Series (NLCS) to not feature a National League East team since 2018; it was the National League Central's first NLCS since 2019.

The Milwaukee Brewers qualified for their seventh postseason in the last eight seasons (third consecutive) on September 13, won the National League Central and earned a first-round bye on September 21, and earned home-field advantage throughout the MLB postseason after the Philadelphia Phillies were defeated by the Minnesota Twins on September 27. The Brewers won their first postseason series since the 2018 National League Division Series when they defeated their rival Chicago Cubs in five games in the Division Series. This was Milwaukee's fourth overall League Championship Series appearance. The Brewers, who moved to the National League in 1998, were looking to win a National League pennant for the first time. (Note: The Brewers won their only pennant during their time in the American League in 1982.) (Note: The city of Milwaukee won National League pennants in 1957 and 1958 before the Braves relocated to Atlanta in 1966.)

The Los Angeles Dodgers qualified for their league-leading thirteenth consecutive postseason appearance on September 19 and won the National League West on September 25 via a road victory against the Arizona Diamondbacks. As the third-best division winner by record, they played and swept the sixth-seeded Cincinnati Reds in the Wild Card Series in two games. The Dodgers then defeated the National League East champion Philadelphia Phillies in four games in the National League Division Series, highlighted by an errant throw by Orion Kerkering that gave the Dodgers the series walk-off win. This was the Dodgers' second consecutive NLCS appearance and the eighth in the last 13 years (2013, 2016–2018, 2020–2021, 2024–2025), as well as their league-leading 17th overall appearance in the round. The Dodgers were looking to become the first back-to-back National League champions since they had done it in the 2017 and 2018 seasons, as well as the first back-to-back World Series champions since the 1999–2000 Yankees.

The Brewers swept the regular season series against the Dodgers, 6–0. It was the first time a National League team swept the Dodgers in a regular season series since the 2006 Cardinals. This series marked the third postseason meeting between the Brewers and the Dodgers, and a rematch of the 2018 NLCS, which the Dodgers won in seven games. Their previous postseason meeting was also in the 2020 NL Wild Card Series, which the Dodgers won in a two-game sweep. Managers Pat Murphy and Dave Roberts were on the same coaching staff, the 2015 San Diego Padres, during the rookie season of their MLB coaching careers.

== Summary ==
Los Angeles won the series, 4–0.

| Game | Date | Score | Location | Time | Attendance |
|---|---|---|---|---|---|
| 1 | October 13 | Los Angeles Dodgers – 2, Milwaukee Brewers – 1 | American Family Field | 2:53 | 41,737 |
| 2 | October 14 | Los Angeles Dodgers – 5, Milwaukee Brewers – 1 | American Family Field | 2:51 | 41,427 |
| 3 | October 16 | Milwaukee Brewers – 1, Los Angeles Dodgers – 3 | Dodger Stadium | 2:48 | 51,251 |
| 4 | October 17 | Milwaukee Brewers – 1, Los Angeles Dodgers – 5 | Dodger Stadium | 2:41 | 52,883 |

== Game summaries ==
=== Game 1 ===
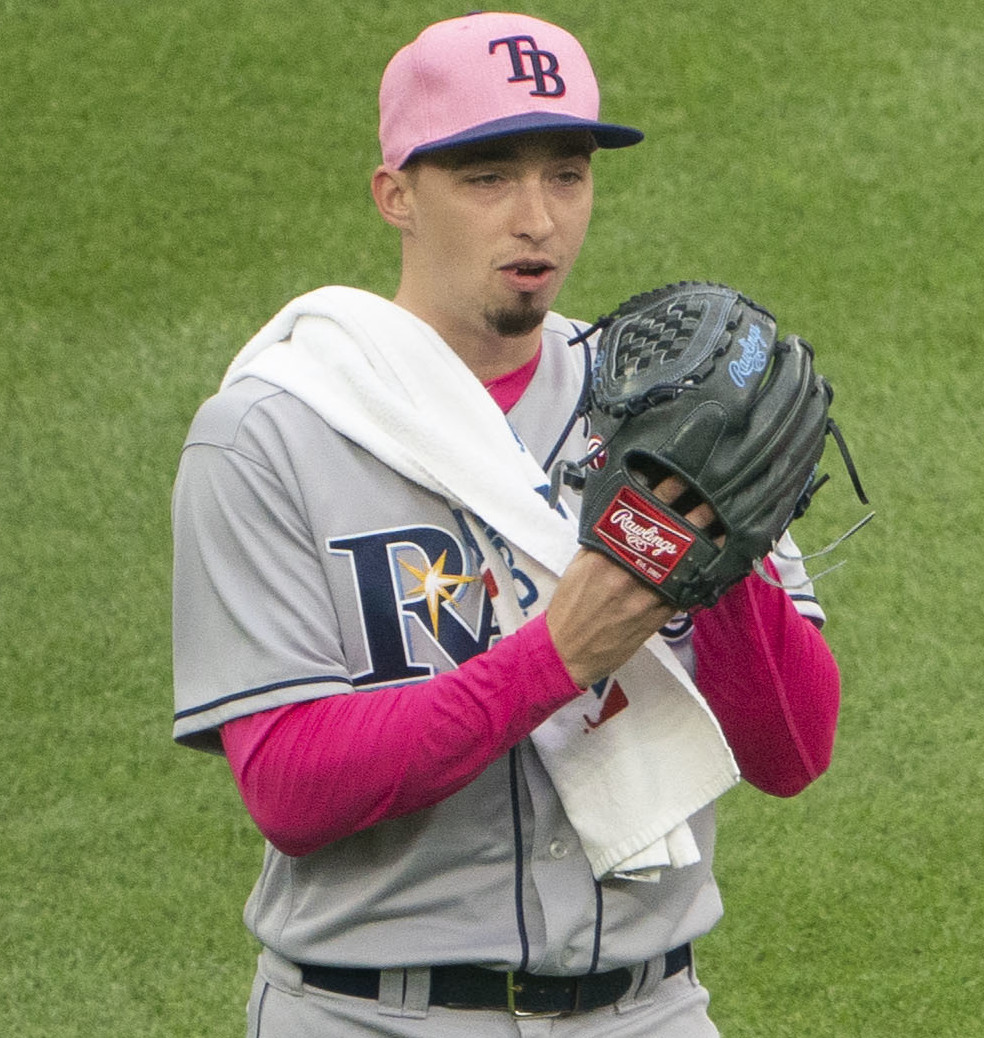
Blake Snell (pictured with the Tampa Bay Rays in 2018) pitched eight scoreless innings and struck out ten batters for Los Angeles in Game 1.

October 13, 2025 7:08 pm (CDT) at American Family Field at Milwaukee, Wisconsin 68 °F (20 °C), Roof Closed
| Team | 1 | 2 | 3 | 4 | 5 | 6 | 7 | 8 | 9 | R | H | E |
|---|---|---|---|---|---|---|---|---|---|---|---|---|
| Los Angeles | 0 | 0 | 0 | 0 | 0 | 1 | 0 | 0 | 1 | 2 | 7 | 0 |
| Milwaukee | 0 | 0 | 0 | 0 | 0 | 0 | 0 | 0 | 1 | 1 | 2 | 0 |
WP: Blake Snell (1–0) LP: Chad Patrick (0–1) Sv: Blake Treinen (1); Home runs: LAD: Freddie Freeman (1); MIL: None; Attendance: 41,737; Boxscore

With the bases loaded and one out in the top of the fourth inning and the game scoreless, the Brewers pulled off the first-ever postseason 8-6-2 double play. On the play, Max Muncy hit a deep fly ball to center field. Brewers outfielder Sal Frelick leaped to catch it, but the ball bounced off his glove, then hit the wall and went back into his glove. Teoscar Hernandez, not knowing the ball went off the wall went back to tag up, something he didn't need to do because according to rule 8.2.4: "If a fair or foul batted ball is caught, other than a foul tip, each base runner shall touch his base after the batted ball has touched a fielder" (note that the ball doesn't necessarily need to be secured by the fielder). This means that Hernandez leaving third base after the ball went off of Frelick's glove would've been a legal tag-up had it been ruled a catch. However, because it went off the wall, it wasn't a catch, and as a result, there was a force at every base. Hernandez's errant second tag-up gave the Brewers enough time to relay and force him out at home. After getting the out at home, Brewers' catcher William Contreras ran down and touched third base, getting the force out on Will Smith, who had returned to second when he thought Frelick made a clean catch.

The game was still scoreless through five complete innings until the top of the sixth inning when Freddie Freeman hit a solo home run off Chad Patrick to give the Dodgers a 1–0 lead. Dodgers starter Blake Snell recorded ten strikeouts, allowed only one hit, and forced the Brewers to go scoreless through eight innings. With the bases loaded at the top of the ninth inning, Abner Uribe issued a walk to Mookie Betts, allowing the Dodgers to take a 2–0 lead. However, in the bottom of the ninth inning, the Brewers were able to get to Dodgers closer Roki Sasaki. An Isaac Collins walk followed by a Jake Bauers double put the tying runs in scoring position with one out. Jackson Chourio hit a sacrifice fly to center field, scoring Collins and cutting the Dodgers' lead to 2–1. However, Blake Treinen struck out Brice Turang to escape a bases-loaded jam for the final out of the game to get the save as the Dodgers took Game 1 of the NLCS.

=== Game 2 ===
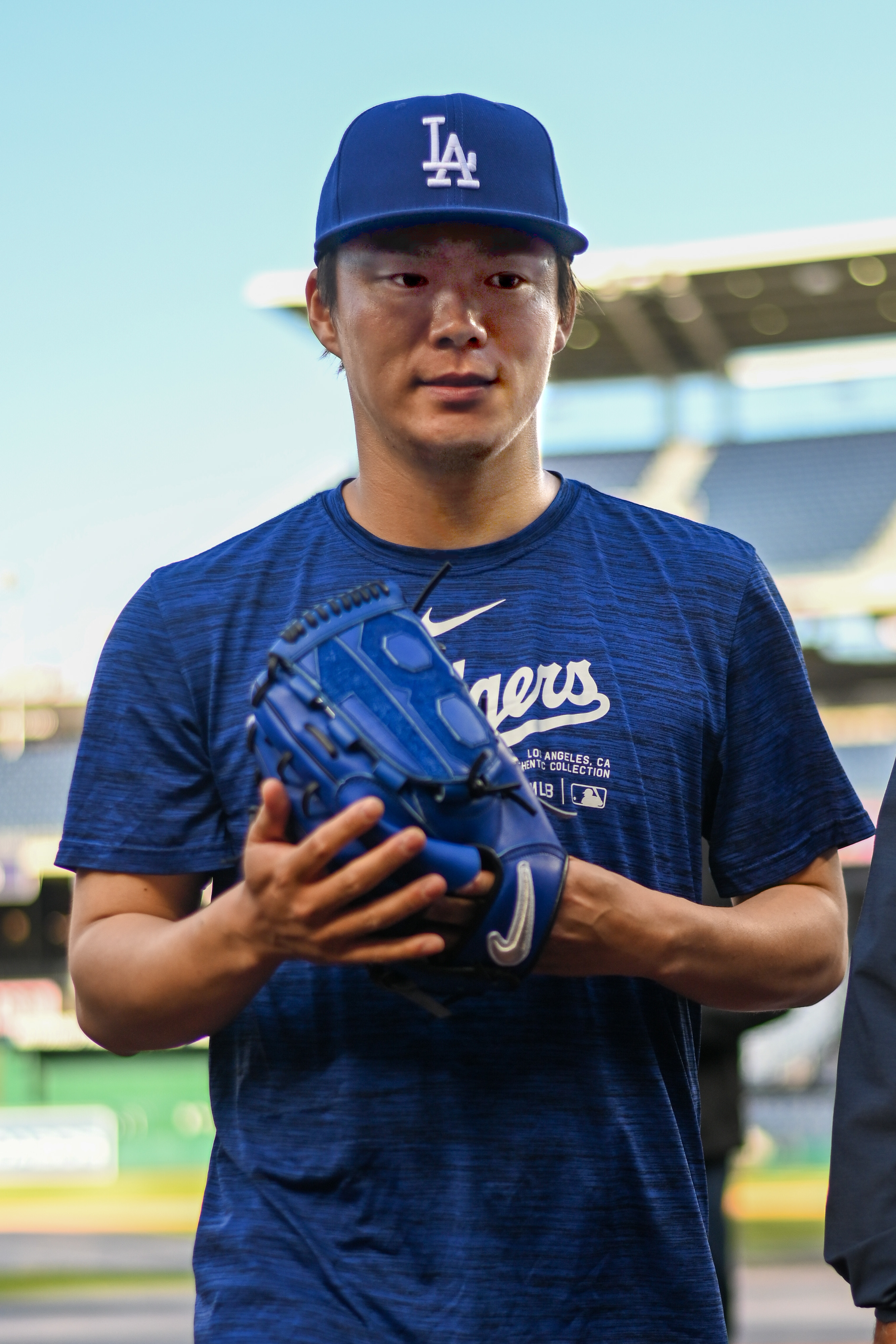
Yoshinobu Yamamoto pitched a complete game and struck out seven batters for Los Angeles in Game 2.

October 14, 2025 7:08 pm (CDT) at American Family Field at Milwaukee, Wisconsin 68 °F (20 °C), Roof Closed
| Team | 1 | 2 | 3 | 4 | 5 | 6 | 7 | 8 | 9 | R | H | E |
|---|---|---|---|---|---|---|---|---|---|---|---|---|
| Los Angeles | 0 | 2 | 0 | 0 | 0 | 1 | 1 | 1 | 0 | 5 | 11 | 1 |
| Milwaukee | 1 | 0 | 0 | 0 | 0 | 0 | 0 | 0 | 0 | 1 | 3 | 1 |
WP: Yoshinobu Yamamoto (1–0) LP: Freddy Peralta (0–1); Home runs: LAD: Teoscar Hernández (1), Max Muncy (1); MIL: Jackson Chourio (1); Attendance: 41,427; Boxscore

In the bottom of the first inning, Jackson Chourio hit a solo leadoff home run off Dodgers starter Yoshinobu Yamamoto on the first pitch to take a 1–0 lead for the Brewers; however, that was all the Brewers would get. In the top of the second inning, Teoscar Hernández homered off Freddy Peralta to tie the game, followed by an Andy Pages RBI double, scoring Enrique Hernández, putting the Dodgers up 2-1 and giving Yamamoto all the run support he'd end up needing. In the top of the sixth inning, Max Muncy hit a solo home run to extend the Dodgers' lead to 3–1, it was his 14th career postseason home run, a new Dodger franchise record. Peralta pitched 5 2/3 innings, allowed five hits, three runs, and walked one batter while striking out four batters. In the top of the seventh inning, Shohei Ohtani scored Enrique Hernández on an RBI single, further extending the lead to 4–1. In the top of the eighth inning, Tommy Edman hit a RBI single, allowing Will Smith to score and extend the lead to 5–1. Yamamoto struck out seven batters, surrendering only three hits and one run in his complete game victory, as the Dodgers took a 2–0 series lead. Yamamoto threw the first complete game in the postseason for the Dodgers since José Lima did it in the third game of the 2004 NLDS and the first for any MLB pitcher since Justin Verlander in Game 2 of the 2017 ALCS. He was also the first Japanese pitcher to throw a complete game in the postseason. Chourio's first inning home run would be the only lead Milwaukee had for the series.

=== Game 3 ===
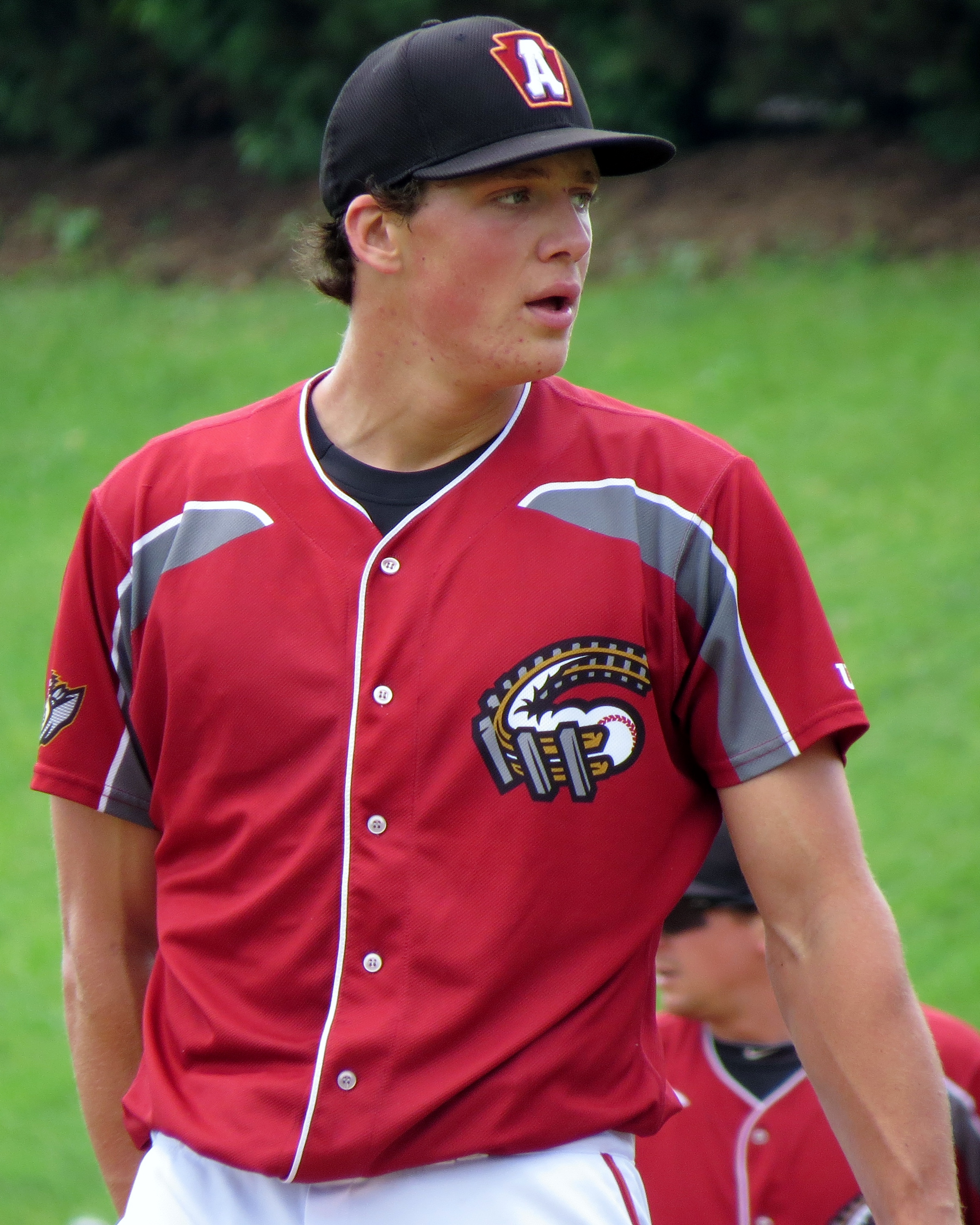
Tyler Glasnow (pictured with the Altoona Curve) pitched 5 2/3 innings and struck out eight batters for Los Angeles in Game 3.

October 16, 2025 3:08 pm (PDT) at Dodger Stadium at Los Angeles, California 77 °F (25 °C), Sunny
| Team | 1 | 2 | 3 | 4 | 5 | 6 | 7 | 8 | 9 | R | H | E |
|---|---|---|---|---|---|---|---|---|---|---|---|---|
| Milwaukee | 0 | 1 | 0 | 0 | 0 | 0 | 0 | 0 | 0 | 1 | 4 | 1 |
| Los Angeles | 1 | 0 | 0 | 0 | 0 | 2 | 0 | 0 | X | 3 | 5 | 1 |
WP: Alex Vesia (1–0) LP: Jacob Misiorowski (0–1) Sv: Roki Sasaki (1); Attendance: 51,251; Boxscore

In the bottom of the first inning, the Dodgers quickly took a 1–0 lead with a Shohei Ohtani triple followed by a Mookie Betts RBI double. Brewers opener Aaron Ashby pitched a 1/3 of an inning, allowed two hits, one run, and walked one batter while striking out one. In the top of the second inning, Caleb Durbin scored on an RBI single by Jake Bauers, tying the game at 1−1. Dodgers starter Tyler Glasnow pitched 5 2/3 innings, allowing three hits, one run, and walking three batters while striking out eight. In the bottom of the sixth inning, Will Smith scored on an RBI single from Tommy Edman, putting the Dodgers ahead at 2–1. Freddie Freeman then scored on a throwing error from Brewers reliever Abner Uribe, extending the Dodgers' lead to 3–1. Roki Sasaki struck out Durbin for the final out of the game for the save as the Dodgers took a 3–0 series lead.

=== Game 4 ===
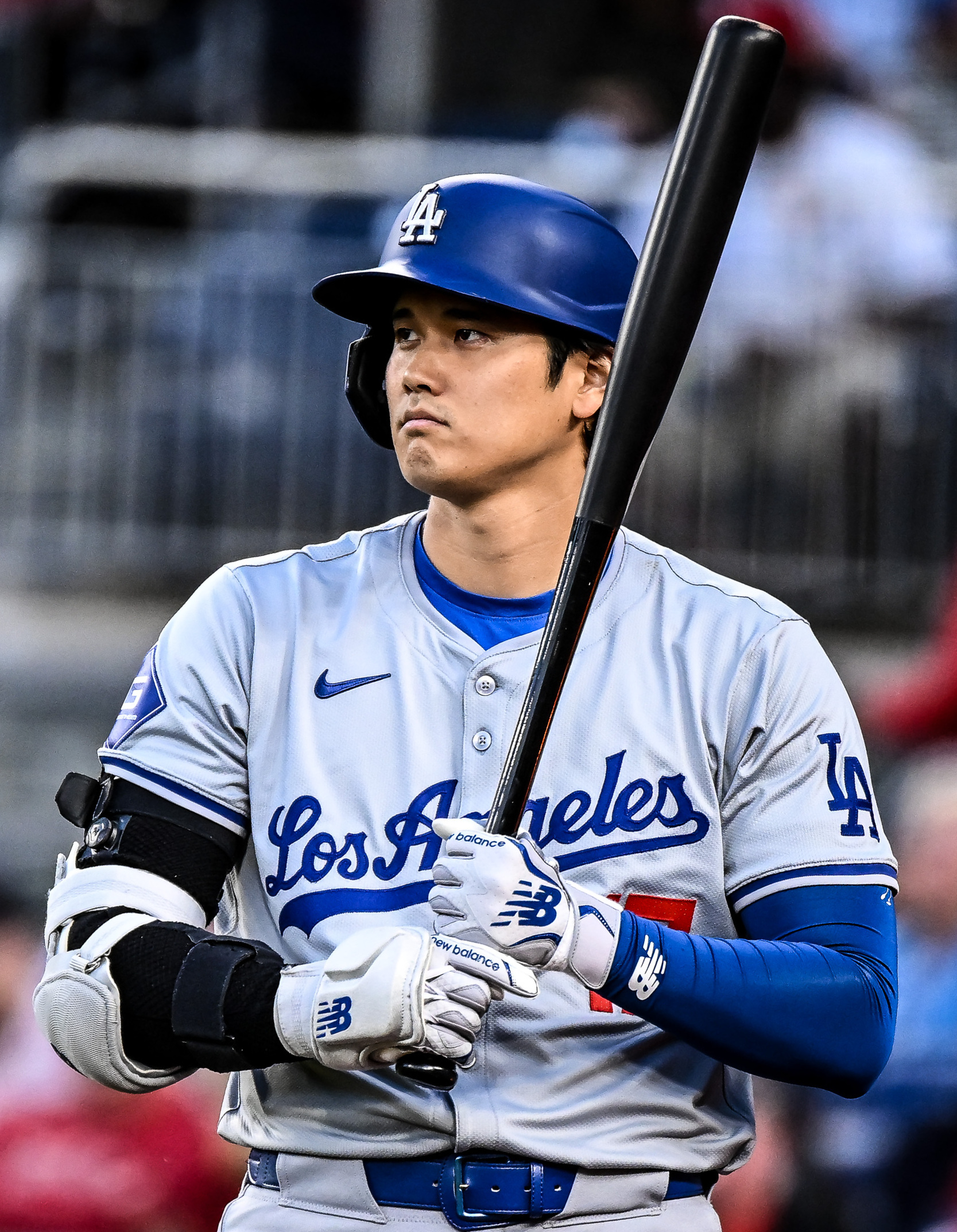
2025 NLCS MVP Shohei Ohtani pitched six scoreless innings, struck out ten batters, and hit three home runs in Game 4.

October 17, 2025 5:38 pm (PDT) at Dodger Stadium at Los Angeles, California 75 °F (24 °C), Clear
| Team | 1 | 2 | 3 | 4 | 5 | 6 | 7 | 8 | 9 | R | H | E |
|---|---|---|---|---|---|---|---|---|---|---|---|---|
| Milwaukee | 0 | 0 | 0 | 0 | 0 | 0 | 0 | 1 | 0 | 1 | 5 | 0 |
| Los Angeles | 3 | 0 | 0 | 1 | 0 | 0 | 1 | 0 | X | 5 | 9 | 0 |
WP: Shohei Ohtani (1–0) LP: José Quintana (0–1); Home runs: MIL: None; LAD: Shohei Ohtani 3 (3); Attendance: 52,883; Boxscore

External videos
- Game 4 full replay on the MLB's official YouTube channel

In the top of the first inning, Shohei Ohtani walked Brice Turang but then struck out Jackson Chourio, Christian Yelich, and William Contreras. In the bottom of the first, Ohtani hit a leadoff home run, making him the first player ever to strike out three batters and then hit a home run after that. Mookie Betts then singled, and Will Smith singled and brought Betts to third. Freddie Freeman would then strike out, but Tommy Edman singled, scoring Betts and bringing Smith to third. Teoscar Hernández then grounded out, but it scored Will Smith and put the Dodgers up 3–0. However, Max Muncy would end the first with a flyout.

Ohtani would pitch a 1-2-3 inning in the top of the second. However, other than a walk by Ohtani, the Dodgers also had three outs in the second. Ohtani walked Blake Perkins in the third but struck out Joey Ortiz. Brice Turang grounded into a double play after that. The bottom of the inning saw Will Smith draw a leadoff walk and Freeman single, bringing José Quintana (the Brewers starter) out of the game. However, the Dodgers did not score in the bottom of the third inning, leaving the score at 3–0 in favor of the Dodgers.

In the fourth inning, Chourio hit a ground rule double and Yelich hit a ground ball to advance him to third. Ohtani, however, struck out William Contreras and Jake Bauers to get out of the inning. With two outs in the bottom of the inning, Ohtani hit the ball over the left field pavilion (a 469 foot moonshot that left the stadium entirely) to become the first Dodger ever to do so. He recorded a 1-2-3 inning in both the fifth and sixth innings, striking out Brice Turang to record his tenth of the game.

Ohtani was taken out after giving up a walk and a single in the seventh, but Alex Vesia relieved him and got out of the inning, keeping the Dodger lead at four to zero. Ohtani would homer in the seventh for his third of the night, but the Dodgers' reliever Blake Treinen gave up a run of a fielder's choice that brought in Caleb Durbin, making it 5-1 Dodgers. The Dodgers had first and second in the eighth but did not score and Roki Sasaki gave up a leadoff single to William Contreras in the ninth. However, the rest of the at bats of the inning were outs, with Durbin's flyout ending the game at 5–1 and the series 4–0.

This was the Brewers' eleventh straight road postseason loss. As a team, the Brewers hit .118 in the NLCS, which was the worst batting average by any team in any postseason series of at least three games in MLB history. This was the Dodgers' first sweep in a seven-game series since the 1963 World Series; in that series against the Yankees, they also allowed just four runs combined, like this series. With the series win, the Dodgers became the first team to play in back-to-back World Series since the Houston Astros did in 2021 and 2022. Additionally, they would be the first team to play in the World Series as the defending champion for the first time since the Philadelphia Phillies did so in 2009.

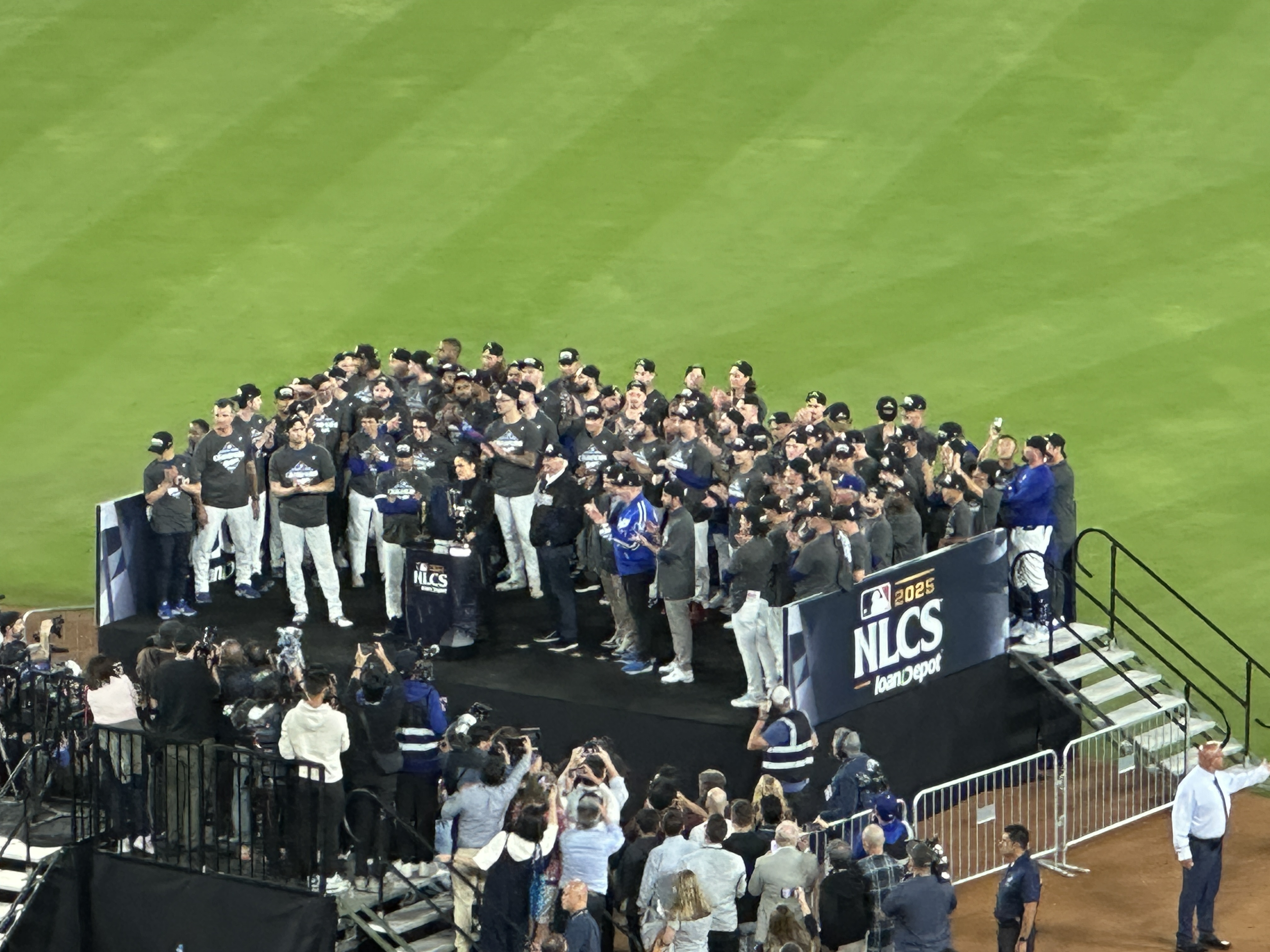
The Dodgers receive the NL Championship trophy on the field at Dodger Stadium.

At the end of the game, Ohtani's performance (3-for-3, three home runs, one walk hitting; 10 strikeouts, 6 innings pitched, two hits, no runs pitching) was widely praised as one of the greatest postseason performances in baseball history. Ohtani won the NLCS MVP, the first postseason award of his career.

=== Composite line score ===
2025 NLCS (4–0): Los Angeles Dodgers beat Milwaukee Brewers

| Team | 1 | 2 | 3 | 4 | 5 | 6 | 7 | 8 | 9 | R | H | E |
|---|---|---|---|---|---|---|---|---|---|---|---|---|
| Los Angeles Dodgers | 4 | 2 | 0 | 1 | 0 | 4 | 2 | 1 | 1 | 15 | 32 | 2 |
| Milwaukee Brewers | 1 | 1 | 0 | 0 | 0 | 0 | 0 | 1 | 1 | 4 | 14 | 2 |
Total attendance: 187,298 Average attendance: 46,824

== See also ==
- 2025 American League Championship Series
