= League Championship Series Most Valuable Player Award =

Major League Baseball award

- Sport: Baseball
- League: Major League Baseball
- Awarded for: Annual most valuable players of the two League Championship Series
- Country: United States, Canada
- Presented by: American League, National League

History
- First award: 1977 (NL), 1980 (AL)
- Most recent: Freddy Peralta (AL); Jake Bauers (NL)

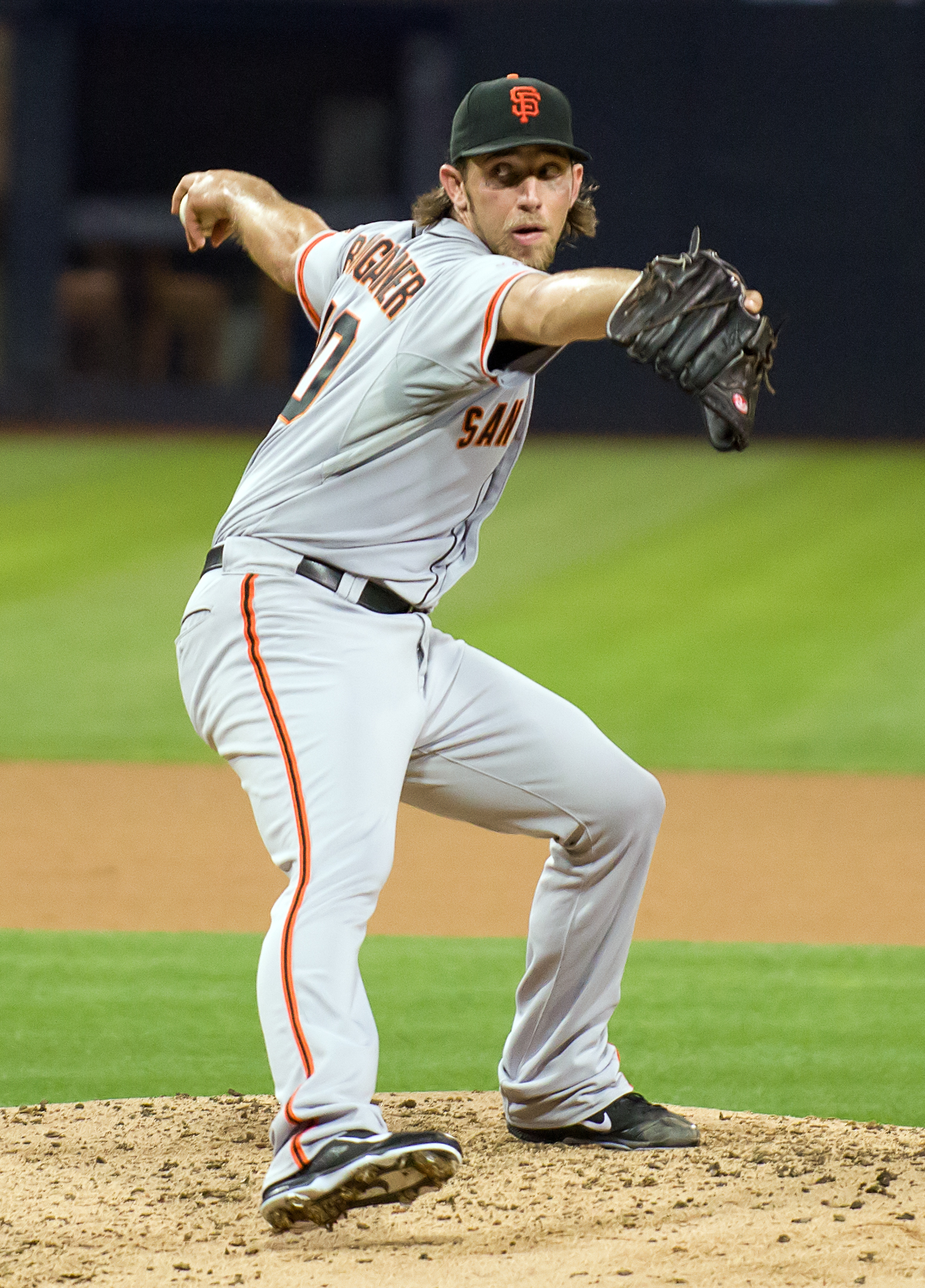
Madison Bumgarner, the 2014 National League Championship Series Most Valuable Player, won both this award and the World Series MVP in the same season.

The League Championship Series Most Valuable Player (MVP) Award is given annually to the Major League Baseball (MLB) players deemed to have the most impact on their teams' performances in each of the two respective League Championship Series that comprise the penultimate round of the MLB postseason. The award is given separately for a player in both the American League Championship Series and the National League Championship Series. It has been presented in the National League (NL) since 1977, and in the American League (AL) since 1980. Dusty Baker won the inaugural award in 1977 with the Los Angeles Dodgers, and Frank White won the first AL award in 1980 with the Kansas City Royals. Twelve LCS MVP winners have been elected to the Baseball Hall of Fame: Roberto Alomar, George Brett, Dennis Eckersley, Rickey Henderson, David Ortiz, Kirby Puckett, CC Sabathia, Ozzie Smith, Mariano Rivera, Iván Rodríguez, John Smoltz, and Willie Stargell.

Three players have won the award twice: Steve Garvey (1978, 1984), Dave Stewart (1990, 1993), and Orel Hershiser (1988, 1995). Incidentally, all three of these players won their two awards with two different teams. Building off of this, Garvey is the only player to win NLCS MVP twice, Stewart the only player to win ALCS MVP twice, and Hershiser the only one to win in both leagues. Nine players have gone on to win the World Series MVP Award in the same season in which they won the LCS MVP—eight from the NL and one from the AL. Three players have won while playing for the losing team in the series: Fred Lynn played for the 1982 California Angels; Mike Scott pitched for the 1986 Houston Astros; and Jeffrey Leonard played for the 1987 San Francisco Giants. Two players have shared the award in the same year three times, all in the NL; Rob Dibble and Randy Myers for the 1990 Cincinnati Reds, the Chicago Cubs' Jon Lester and Javier Báez in 2016, and Chris Taylor and Justin Turner of the Los Angeles Dodgers in 2017. 29 of the 30 MLB teams have had a player receive an LCS MVP Award.

Adam Kennedy won the 2002 ALCS MVP when he hit three home runs in a single game; he had hit 7 during the regular season and hit 80 in his 14-year career. Nelson Cruz won the award in the 2011 ALCS after hitting six home runs in the series. Adolis García won the award after having 15 RBIs during the 2023 ALCS. From the pitcher's mound, Steve Avery threw 16 1/3 innings without giving up a run in the 1991 NLCS, and John Smoltz amassed 19 strikeouts the following year to win MVP honours. Liván Hernández won the 1997 NLCS MVP after winning his only start and earning a win out of the bullpen in relief; he struck out 16 in 10 2/3 innings. Daniel Murphy won the 2015 NLCS MVP after hitting home runs in six consecutive games (including the final two games of the preceding division series), setting a major league record for consecutive postseason games with a home run. Shohei Ohtani won the 2025 NLCS MVP after hitting three home runs and pitching six shutout innings with 10 strikeouts in Game 4. (Note: No player had struck out even five batters where they hit three home runs in any MLB game. No player had hit more than two home runs in a career in games they pitched before in MLB history.)

Liván Hernández (1997, NL) and his half-brother Orlando Hernández (1999, AL) are the only family pair to have won the award. The only rookies to have won the award are Mike Boddicker (1983, AL), Liván Hernández (1997, NL), Michael Wacha (2013, NL), Randy Arozarena (2020, AL) and Jeremy Peña (2022, AL).

== Key ==
Year	Links to the article about that corresponding ALCS or NLCS
†	Member of the Baseball Hall of Fame
*	Indicates that the player won the World Series MVP Award the same year
§	Indicates that the player's team lost the series
^	Indicates multiple award winners in the same year
(#)	Indicates number of times winning League Championship Series MVP at that point (if he won multiple times)

== American League winners ==
Freddy Peralta (2026 ALCS MVP)

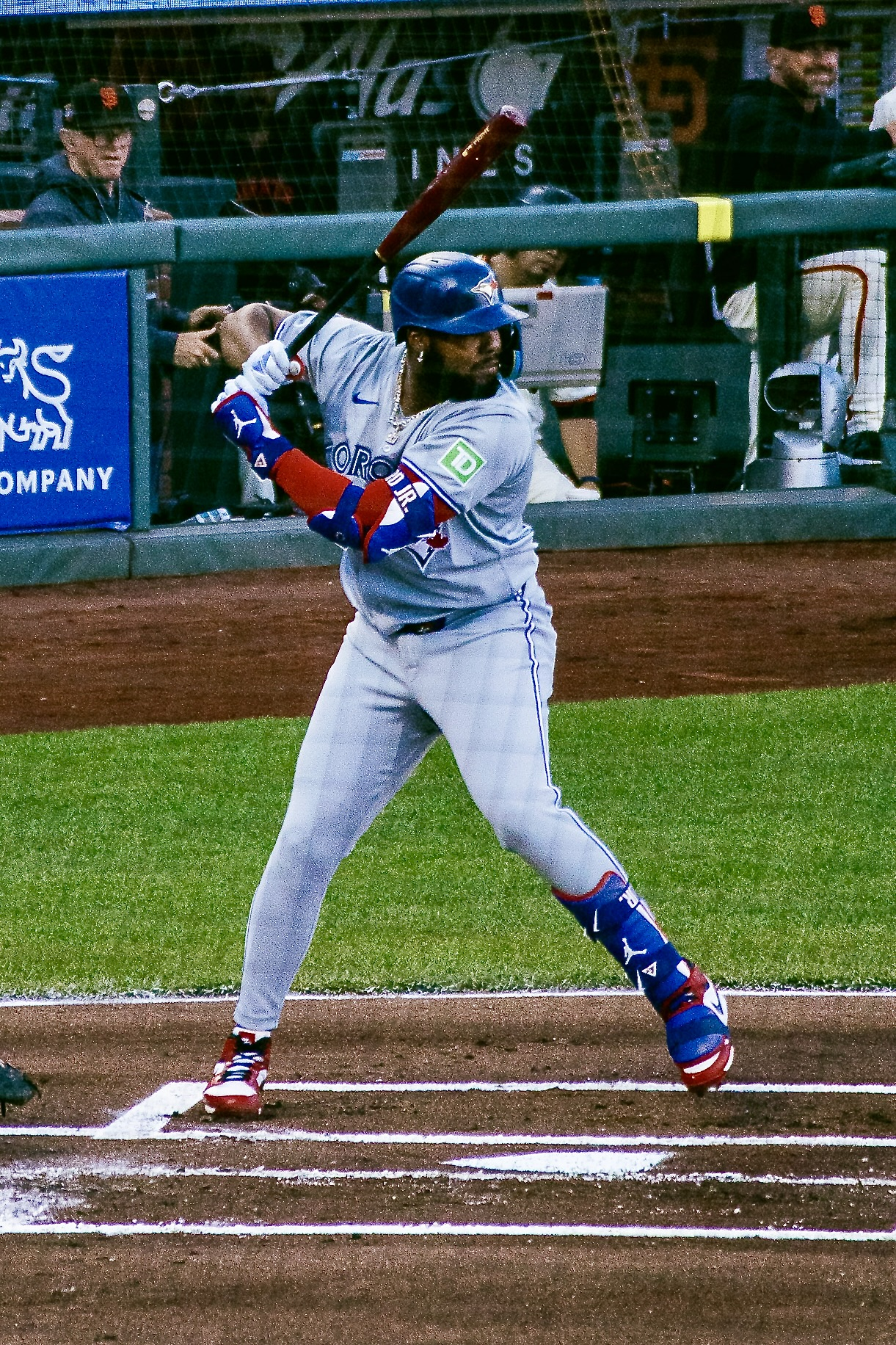
Vladimir Guerrero Jr. (2025 ALCS MVP)

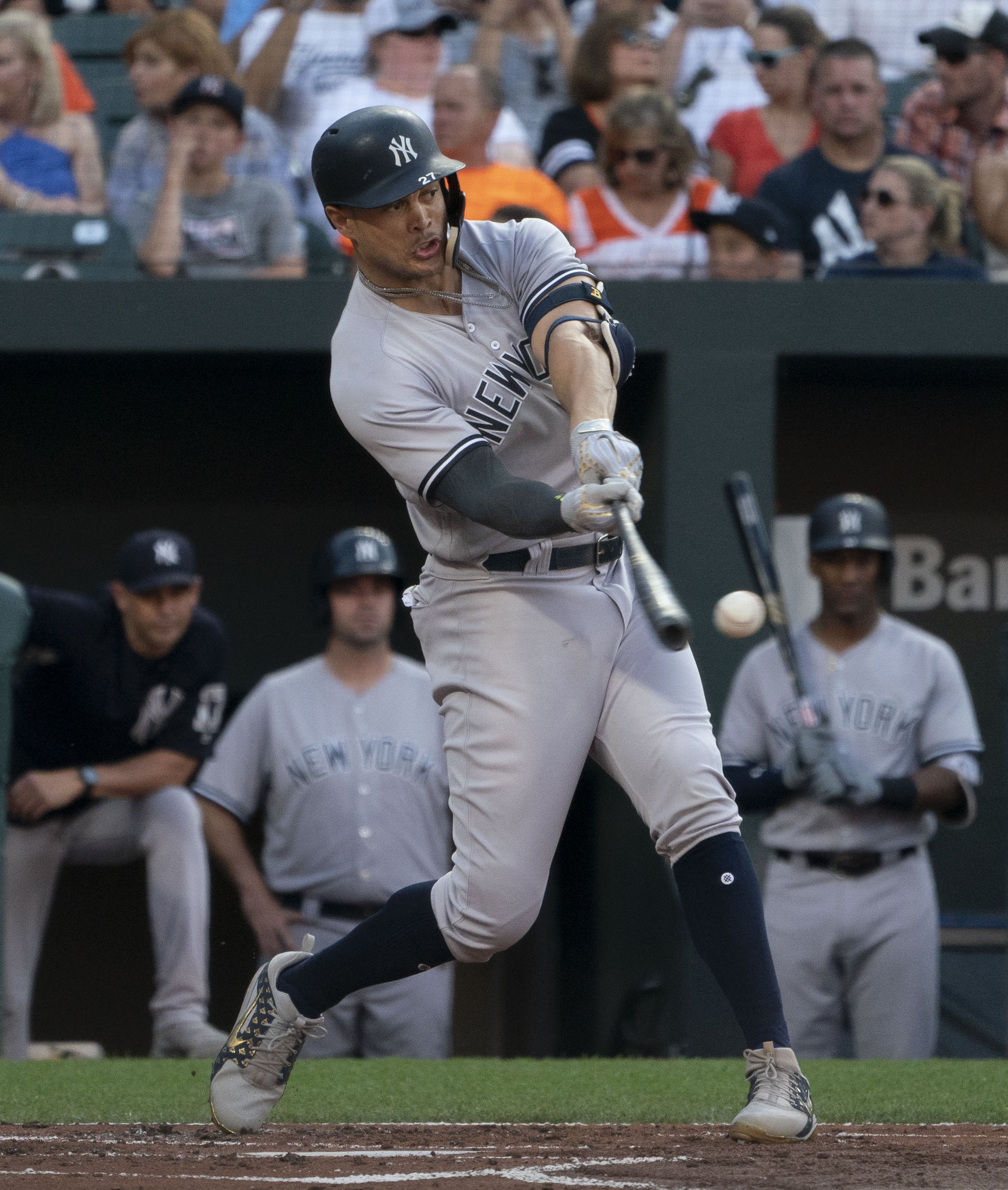
Giancarlo Stanton (2024 ALCS MVP)

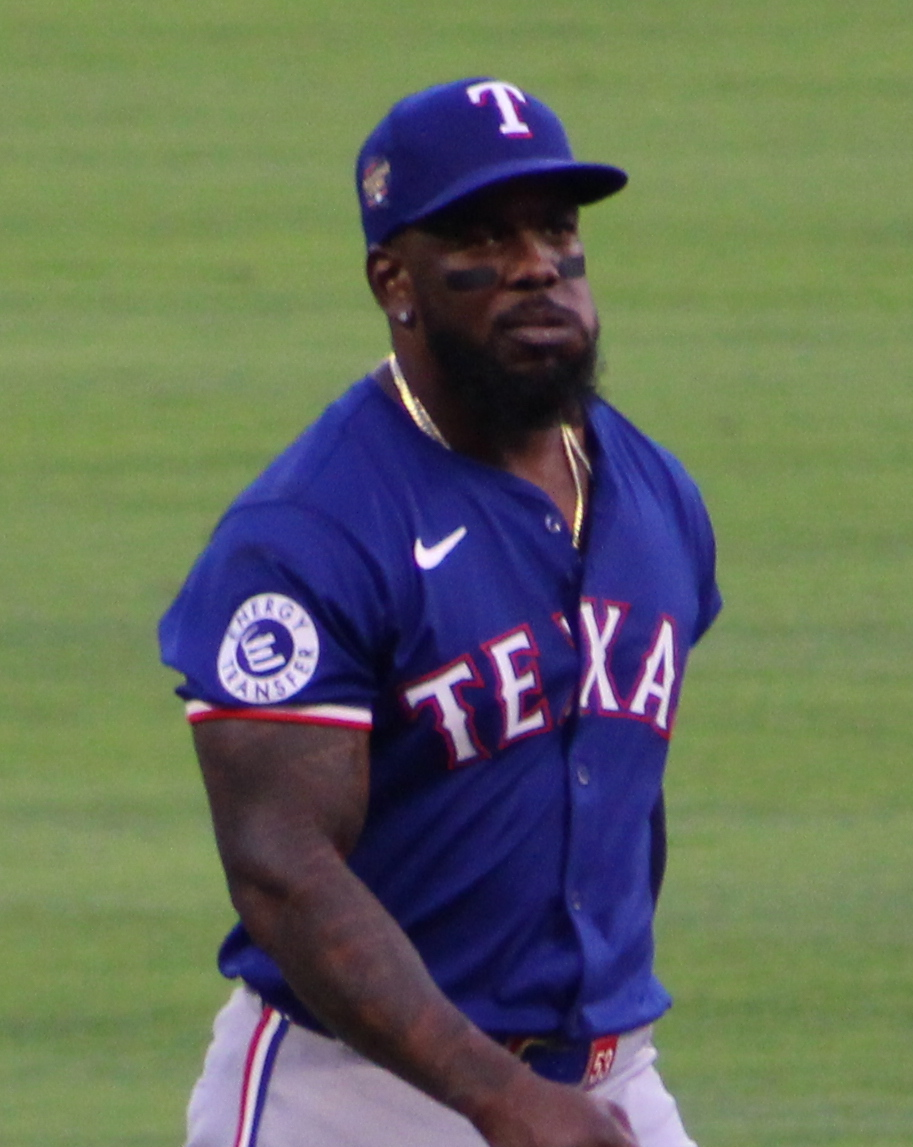
Adolis García (2023 ALCS MVP)

Jeremy Peña (2022 ALCS MVP)

Year	Player	Team	Position	Selected statistics	Ref
1980	Frank White	Kansas City Royals	Second baseman	.545 batting average; 1 home run; 3 runs batted in	
1981	Graig Nettles	New York Yankees	Third baseman	.500 batting average; 3 extra-base hits; 9 runs batted in	
1982	Fred Lynn	California Angels^{§}	Outfielder	.611 batting average; 11 hits; 5 runs batted in	
1983	Mike Boddicker	Baltimore Orioles	Starting pitcher	1–0 record over 1 start; 1 shutout; 9 scoreless innings pitched; 14 strikeouts	
1984	Kirk Gibson	Detroit Tigers	Outfielder	.417 batting average; 1 home run; 2 runs batted in	
1985	George Brett^{†}	Kansas City Royals	Third baseman	.348 batting average; 3 home runs; 5 runs batted in	
1986	Marty Barrett	Boston Red Sox	Second baseman	.367 batting average; 11 hits; 5 runs batted in	
1987	Gary Gaetti	Minnesota Twins	Third baseman	.300 batting average; 2 home runs; 5 runs batted in	
1988	Dennis Eckersley^{†}	Oakland Athletics	Relief pitcher	4 saves over 4 appearances; 6 scoreless innings pitched; 5 strikeouts	
1989	Rickey Henderson^{†}	Oakland Athletics	Outfielder	.400 batting average; 2 home runs; 8 stolen bases	
1990	Dave Stewart	Oakland Athletics	Starting pitcher	2–0 record over 2 games started; 2 runs allowed over 16 innings; 0.63 WHIP	
1991	Kirby Puckett^{†}	Minnesota Twins	Outfielder	.429 batting average; 2 home runs; 5 runs batted in	
1992	Roberto Alomar^{†}	Toronto Blue Jays	Second baseman	.423 batting average; 2 home runs; 4 runs batted in	
1993	Dave Stewart (2)	Toronto Blue Jays	Starting pitcher	2–0 record over 2 games started; 3 runs allowed over 13 1/3 innings; 8 strikeouts	
1994	Series cancelled due to player's strike				
1995	Orel Hershiser (2)	Cleveland Indians	Starting pitcher	2–0 record over 2 games started; 2 earned runs allowed over 14 innings; 15 strikeouts	
1996	Bernie Williams	New York Yankees	Outfielder	.474 batting average; 2 home runs; 6 runs batted in	
1997	Marquis Grissom	Cleveland Indians	Outfielder	Game-winning home run in 8th inning of Game 2; 6 hits; 3 stolen bases	
1998	David Wells	New York Yankees	Starting pitcher	2–0 record over 2 games started; 5 runs allowed over 15 2/3 innings; 18 strikeouts	
1999	Orlando Hernández	New York Yankees	Starting pitcher	1–0 record over 2 games started; 3 earned runs allowed over 15 innings; 13 strikeouts	
2000	David Justice	New York Yankees	Outfielder	.824 OPS; 2 home runs; 8 runs batted in	
2001	Andy Pettitte	New York Yankees	Starting pitcher	2–0 record over 2 games started; 4 runs allowed over 14 1/3 innings; 8 strikeouts	
2002	Adam Kennedy	Anaheim Angels	Second baseman	.357 batting average; 3 home runs; 5 runs batted in	
2003	Mariano Rivera^{†}	New York Yankees	Relief pitcher	1 win and 2 saves over 4 appearances; 1 run allowed over 8 innings; 6 strikeouts	
2004	David Ortiz^{†}	Boston Red Sox	Designated hitter	.387 batting average; 3 home runs; 11 runs batted in	
2005	Paul Konerko	Chicago White Sox	First baseman	.286 batting average; 2 home runs; 7 runs batted in	
2006	Plácido Polanco	Detroit Tigers	Second baseman	.529 batting average; 9 hits; 2 runs batted in	
2007	Josh Beckett	Boston Red Sox	Starting pitcher	2–0 record over 2 games started; 3 runs allowed over 14 innings; 18 strikeouts	
2008	Matt Garza	Tampa Bay Rays	Starting pitcher	2–0 record over 2 games started; 2 runs allowed over 13 innings; 14 strikeouts	
2009	CC Sabathia^{†}	New York Yankees	Starting pitcher	2–0 record over 2 games started; 2 runs allowed over 16 innings; 12 strikeouts	
2010	Josh Hamilton	Texas Rangers	Outfielder	.350 batting average; 4 home runs; 7 runs batted in	
2011	Nelson Cruz	Texas Rangers	Outfielder	.364 batting average; 6 home runs; 13 runs batted in	
2012	Delmon Young	Detroit Tigers	Designated hitter	.353 batting average; 2 home runs; 5 runs batted in	
2013	Koji Uehara	Boston Red Sox	Relief pitcher	1 win and 3 saves over 5 appearances; 6 scoreless innings pitched; 9 strikeouts	
2014	Lorenzo Cain	Kansas City Royals	Outfielder	.533 batting average; 5 runs scored; 8 hits	
2015	Alcides Escobar	Kansas City Royals	Shortstop	.478 batting average; 11 hits; 6 runs scored	
2016	Andrew Miller	Cleveland Indians	Relief pitcher	1 save in 4 appearances; 0 runs allowed over 7 2/3 innings; 14 strikeouts	
2017	Justin Verlander	Houston Astros	Starting pitcher	2–0 record over 2 games started; 1 complete game; 1 run allowed over 16 innings; 21 strikeouts	
2018	Jackie Bradley Jr.	Boston Red Sox	Center fielder	9 runs batted in; 2 home runs; 1.067 OPS	
2019	Jose Altuve	Houston Astros	Second baseman	Series-winning walk-off home run; .348 batting average; 6 runs scored / 3 runs batted in	
2020	Randy Arozarena	Tampa Bay Rays	Outfielder	.321 batting average; 4 home runs; 1.152 OPS	
2021	Yordan Alvarez	Houston Astros	Designated hitter	.522 batting average; 7 runs scored / 6 runs batted in; 1.408 OPS	
2022*	Jeremy Peña	Houston Astros	Shortstop	.353 batting average; 7 runs scored / 5 runs batted in; .991 OPS	
2023	Adolis García	Texas Rangers	Outfielder	5 home runs; 1 grand slam; 15 runs batted in	
2024	Giancarlo Stanton	New York Yankees	Designated hitter	4 home runs; 7 runs batted in; 1.222 OPS	
2025	Vladimir Guerrero Jr.	Toronto Blue Jays	First baseman	3 home runs; .385 batting average; 1.330 OPS	
2026	Freddy Peralta	Tampa Bay Rays	Starting pitcher	2–0 record over 2 games started + relief; 0.75 ERA over 12 innings; 9 strikeouts	

== National League winners ==
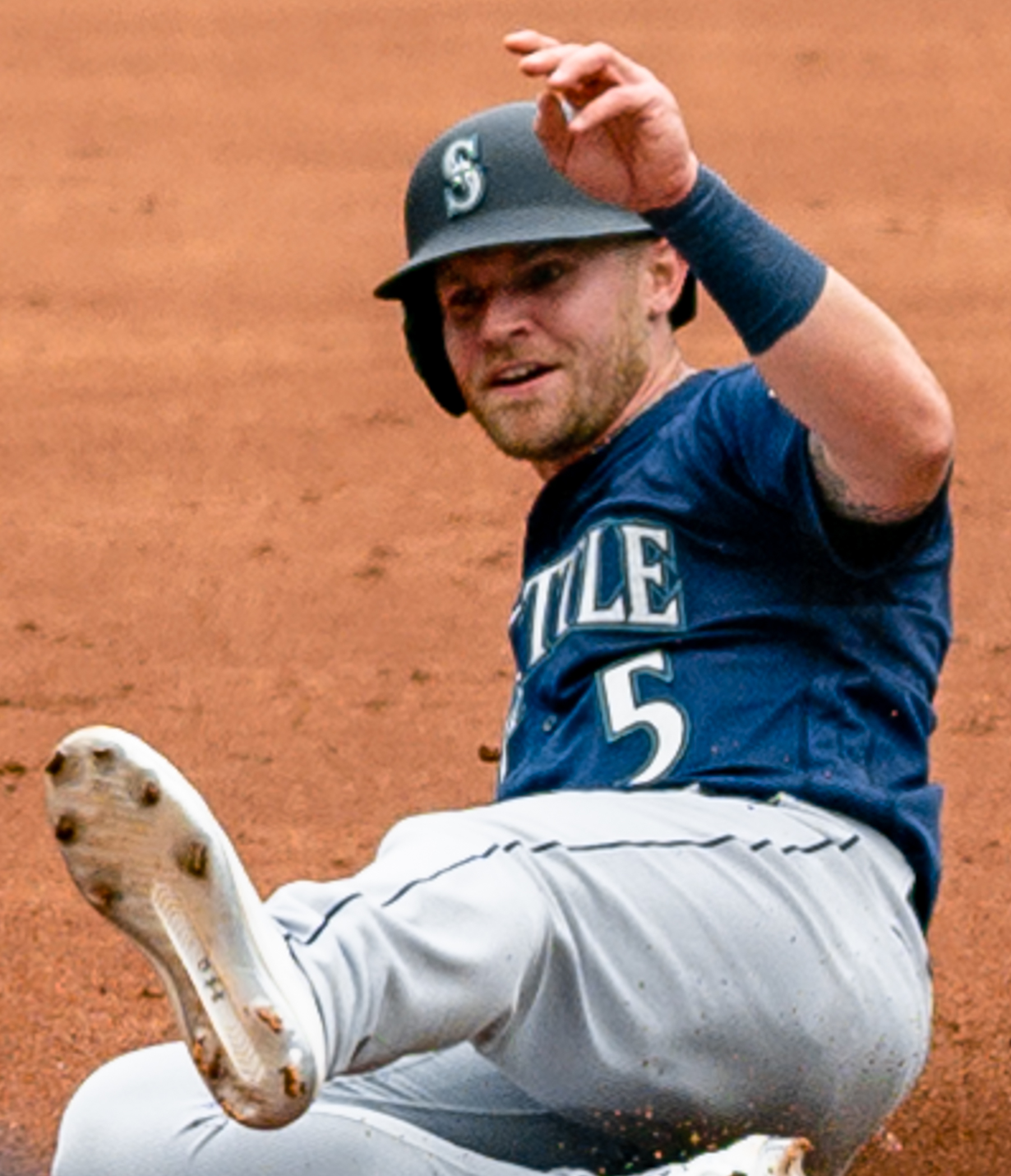
Jake Bauers (2026 NLCS MVP)

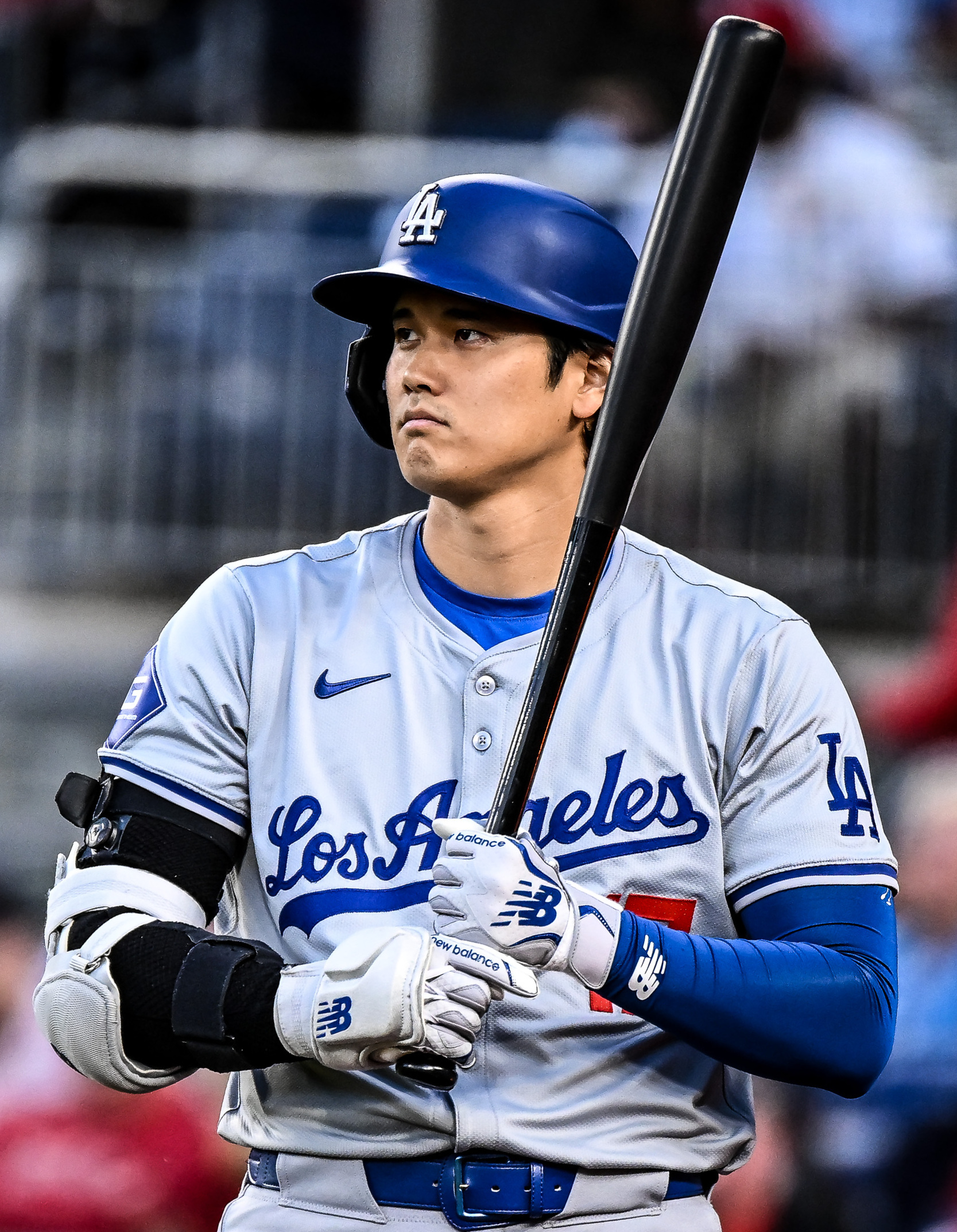
Shohei Ohtani (2025 NLCS MVP)

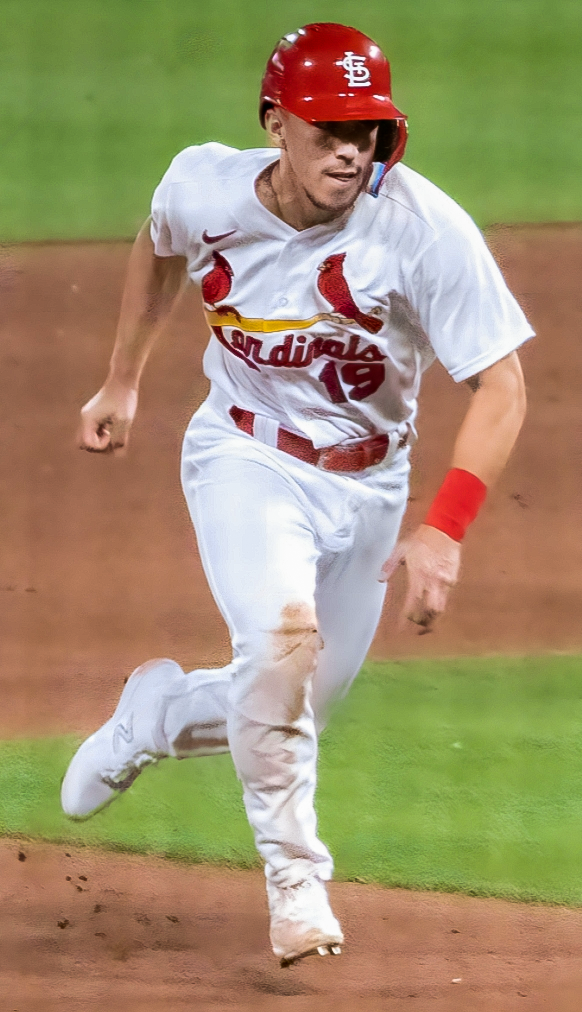
Tommy Edman (2024 NLCS MVP)

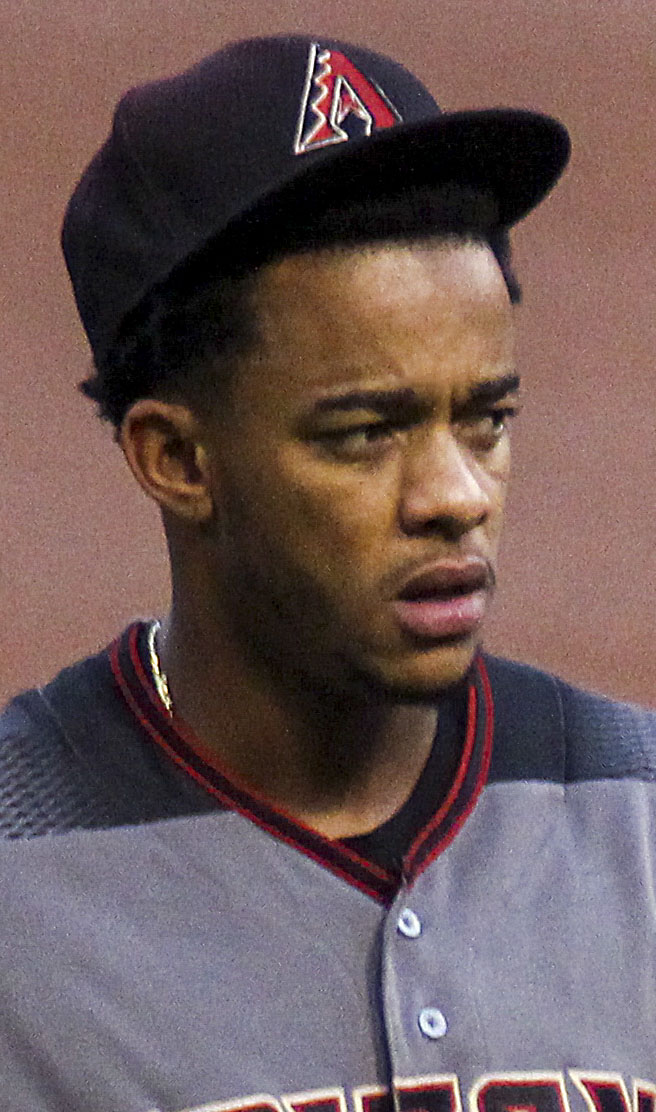
Ketel Marte (2023 NLCS MVP)

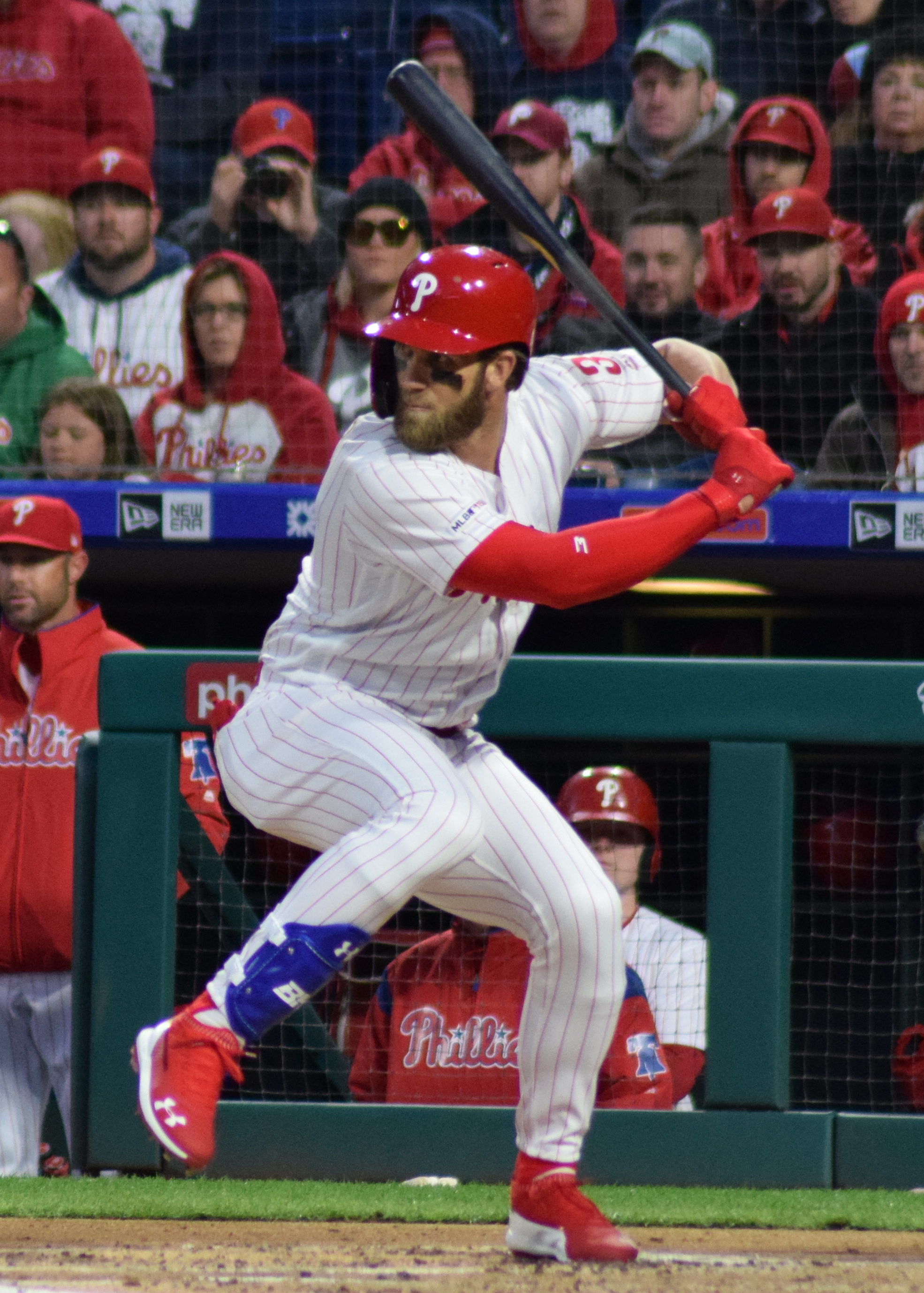
Bryce Harper (2022 NLCS MVP)

Year	Player	Team	Position	Selected statistics	Ref
1977	Dusty Baker	Los Angeles Dodgers	Outfielder	.357 batting average; 2 home runs; 8 runs batted in	
1978	Steve Garvey	Los Angeles Dodgers	First baseman	.389 batting average; 4 home runs; 7 runs batted in	
1979*	Willie Stargell^{†}	Pittsburgh Pirates	First baseman	.455 batting average; 2 home runs; 6 runs batted in	
1980	Manny Trillo	Philadelphia Phillies	Second baseman	.381 batting average; 8 hits; 4 runs batted in	
1981	Burt Hooton	Los Angeles Dodgers	Starting pitcher	2–0 record over 2 games started; 0 earned runs allowed over 14 2/3 innings; 1.16 WHIP	
1982*	Darrell Porter	St. Louis Cardinals	Catcher	.556 batting average; 5 hits; 3 doubles; 5 walks	
1983	Gary Matthews	Philadelphia Phillies	Outfielder	.429 batting average; 3 home runs; 8 runs batted in	
1984	Steve Garvey (2)	San Diego Padres	First baseman	.400 batting average; Walk-off home run in Game 4; 7 runs batted in	
1985	Ozzie Smith^{†}	St. Louis Cardinals	Shortstop	.435 batting average; Walk-off home run in Game 5; 3 runs batted in	
1986	Mike Scott	Houston Astros^{§}	Starting pitcher	2–0 record over 2 games started; both were complete games - 1 shutout; 1 run allowed over 18 innings; 19 strikeouts	
1987	Jeffrey Leonard	San Francisco Giants^{§}	Outfielder	.417 batting average; 4 home runs; 5 runs batted in	
1988*	Orel Hershiser	Los Angeles Dodgers	Pitcher	1–0 record and 1 save over 4 appearances; 3 starts - 1 shutout; 3 earned runs allowed over 24 2/3 innings; 15 strikeouts	
1989	Will Clark	San Francisco Giants	First baseman	.650 batting average; 13 hits; 8 runs batted in	
1990^{^}	Rob Dibble	Cincinnati Reds	Relief pitcher	1 save over 4 appearances; 5 scoreless innings pitched; 10 strikeouts	
1990^{^}	Randy Myers	Cincinnati Reds	Relief pitcher	3 saves over 4 appearances; 5 2/3 scoreless innings pitched; 7 strikeouts	
1991	Steve Avery	Atlanta Braves	Starting pitcher	2–0 record over 2 games started; 16 1/3 scoreless innings pitched; 17 strikeouts	
1992	John Smoltz^{†}	Atlanta Braves	Starting pitcher	2–0 record over 3 games started; 6 earned runs allowed over 20 1/3 innings; 19 strikeouts	
1993	Curt Schilling	Philadelphia Phillies	Starting pitcher	2 no-decisions over 2 games started; 3 earned runs allowed over 16 innings pitched; 19 strikeouts	
1994	Series cancelled due to player's strike				
1995	Mike Devereaux	Atlanta Braves	Outfielder	.308 batting average; 1 home run; 5 runs batted in	
1996	Javy López	Atlanta Braves	Catcher	.542 batting average; 5 doubles/ 2 home runs; 6 runs batted in	
1997*	Liván Hernández	Florida Marlins	Starting pitcher	2 wins over 2 appearances; 1 relief appearance and 1 start which was a complete game; 1 run allowed over 10 2/3 innings; 16 strikeouts	
1998	Sterling Hitchcock	San Diego Padres	Starting pitcher	2–0 record over 2 games started; 1 run allowed over 10 innings; 14 strikeouts	
1999	Eddie Pérez	Atlanta Braves	Catcher	.500 batting average; 2 home runs; 5 runs batted in	
2000	Mike Hampton	New York Mets	Starting pitcher	2–0 record over 2 games started; 1 shutout; 16 scoreless innings pitched; 12 strikeouts	
2001	Craig Counsell	Arizona Diamondbacks	Infielder	.381 batting average; 4 runs batted in; 5 runs scored	
2002	Benito Santiago	San Francisco Giants	Catcher	.300 batting average; 2 home runs; 6 runs batted in	
2003	Iván Rodríguez^{†}	Florida Marlins	Catcher	.321 batting average; 2 home runs; 10 runs batted in	
2004	Albert Pujols	St. Louis Cardinals	First baseman	.500 batting average; 4 home runs; 9 runs batted in	
2005	Roy Oswalt	Houston Astros	Starting pitcher	2–0 record over 2 games started; 2 runs allowed over 14 innings; 12 strikeouts	
2006	Jeff Suppan	St. Louis Cardinals	Starting pitcher	1–0 record over 2 games started; 1 run allowed over 15 innings; 1 home run hit in Game 3	
2007	Matt Holliday	Colorado Rockies	Outfielder	.333 batting average; 2 home runs; 4 runs batted in	
2008*	Cole Hamels	Philadelphia Phillies	Starting pitcher	2–0 record over 2 games started; 3 runs allowed over 14 innings; 13 strikeouts	
2009	Ryan Howard	Philadelphia Phillies	First baseman	.333 batting average; 2 home runs and 8 runs batted in; Tied Lou Gehrig's record for most consecutive postseason games with a run batted in (8)	
2010	Cody Ross	San Francisco Giants	Outfielder	.350 batting average; 3 home runs; 5 runs batted in	
2011*	David Freese	St. Louis Cardinals	Third baseman	.545 batting average; 3 home runs; 9 runs batted in	
2012	Marco Scutaro	San Francisco Giants	Second baseman	.500 batting average; 14 hits; 4 runs batted in	
2013	Michael Wacha	St. Louis Cardinals	Starting pitcher	2–0 record over 2 games started; 13 2/3 scoreless innings pitched; 13 strikeouts	
2014*	Madison Bumgarner	San Francisco Giants	Starting pitcher	1–0 record over 2 games started; 3 runs allowed over 15 2/3 innings; 12 strikeouts	
2015	Daniel Murphy	New York Mets	Infielder	.529 batting average; 4 home runs; 6 runs batted in; Major League record for hitting home runs in 6 consecutive playoff games.	
2016^{^}	Jon Lester	Chicago Cubs	Starting pitcher	1–0 record over 2 games started; 2 runs allowed over 13 innings; 9 strikeouts	
2016^{^}	Javier Báez	Chicago Cubs	Infielder	.368 batting average; 7 hits; 4 doubles; 5 runs batted in	
2017^{^}	Justin Turner	Los Angeles Dodgers	Third baseman	1.402 OPS; 6 runs batted in; Walk-off home run to win Game 2	
2017^{^}	Chris Taylor	Los Angeles Dodgers	Outfielder	1.221 OPS; 3 runs batted in; 2 home runs	
2018	Cody Bellinger	Los Angeles Dodgers	First baseman	1 home run; 4 runs batted in; Walk-off single to win Game 4	
2019	Howie Kendrick	Washington Nationals	Second baseman	.333 batting average (5-for-15); 4 runs batted in; 4 runs scored	
2020*	Corey Seager	Los Angeles Dodgers	Shortstop	11 runs batted in; 5 home runs	
2021	Eddie Rosario	Atlanta Braves	Outfielder	.560 batting average; 9 runs batted in; 3 home runs; 1.647 OPS	
2022	Bryce Harper	Philadelphia Phillies	Designated hitter	.400 batting average; 5 runs batted in; 2 home runs; 1.250 OPS	
2023	Ketel Marte	Arizona Diamondbacks	Second baseman	.387 batting average; 3 runs batted in; .987 OPS; Walk-off single to win Game 3	
2024	Tommy Edman	Los Angeles Dodgers	Shortstop	.407 batting average; 11 hits; 11 runs batted in; 1.023 OPS	
2025	Shohei Ohtani	Los Angeles Dodgers	Designated hitter / Starting pitcher	6 scoreless innings pitched and 3 home runs in Game 4; 10 strikeouts; .357 batting average (5-for-14); 1.643 OPS	
2026	Jake Bauers	Milwaukee Brewers	First baseman	A 12-pitch at-bat leading to a walk vs. Yoshinobu Yamamoto in Game 2; A game-winning home run after an 11-pitch at-bat vs. Blake Snell in Game 3; 6 runs batted in; .864 OPS	
