= Irma Peralta =

Mexican artist (born 1936)

Irma Peralta (born 1936) is a Mexican ceramist.

Born in Mexico City, Peralta studied at Mexico City College with Frank González (ceramics) and Geles Cabrera (sculpture); she also studied design and artisanry at the Instituto Nacional de Bellas Artes y Literatura. In 1966 she received her teacher's certificate, having inaugurated the First Salon of Modern Ceramics under the aegis of the Secretariat of Tourism the previous year. In 1970 she formed the group Cone 10 Ceramists to publicize the stoneware technique. From 1971 to 1976 Peralta taught at the Talleres Sabatinos in the Museo Nacional de las Culturas. She has exhibited widely in Mexico.
