= Víctor Peralta =

Víctor Peralta may refer to:

- Víctor Peralta (boxer) (1908–1995), Argentine boxer
- Víctor Peralta (athlete) (born 1942), retired long-distance runner from Mexico
