= Freddy Peralta =

Dominican baseball player (born 1996)

- Peralta with the Tampa Bay Rays in 2026

Free agent
- Pitcher
- Born: June 4, 1996 (age 30); Moca, Dominican Republic
- Bats: Right Throws: Right

MLB debut
- May 13, 2018, for the Milwaukee Brewers

MLB statistics (through 2026 season)
- Win–loss record: 80–53
- Earned run average: 3.71
- Strikeouts: 1,309
- Stats at Baseball Reference

Teams
- Milwaukee Brewers (2018–2025); New York Mets (2026); Tampa Bay Rays (2026)

Career highlights and awards
- 2× All-Star (2021, 2025); ALCS MVP (2026); NL wins leader (2025)

Freddy Peralta Diaz (born June 4, 1996) is a Dominican professional baseball pitcher who is a free agent. He has played in Major League Baseball (MLB) for the Milwaukee Brewers, New York Mets, and Tampa Bay Rays. He made his MLB debut in 2018. He was named an All-Star in 2021 and 2025 and led the National League (NL) in wins in 2025.

== Early life ==
Freddy Peralta was born in Moca, Dominican Republic, on June 4, 1996, to Pedro Peralta and Octavia Diaz.

== Career ==
=== Minor leagues ===
Peralta signed with the Seattle Mariners as an international free agent in April 2013 with a $137,000 signing bonus. He made his professional debut that year with the Dominican Summer League Mariners and spent the whole season there, going 3–3 with a 1.46 ERA in 13 games (ten starts). In 2014, he pitched for the Arizona League Mariners, where he pitched to a 1–6 record and 5.29 ERA in 12 starts, and in 2015, he returned there, going 2–3 with a 4.11 ERA in 11 games (nine starts).

On December 9, 2015, the Mariners traded Peralta, Daniel Missaki and Carlos Herrera to the Milwaukee Brewers for Adam Lind. He spent 2016 with the Wisconsin Timber Rattlers and the Biloxi Shuckers, pitching to a combined 4–4 record and 3.62 ERA in 82 innings.

Peralta pitched 2017 with the Carolina Mudcats and Biloxi. In 25 games (19 starts) between the two clubs, he was 3–8 with a 2.63 ERA and 1.16 WHIP. The Brewers added him to their 40-man roster after the season. MLB.com ranked Peralta as Milwaukee's tenth-ranked prospect going into the 2018 season.

=== Milwaukee Brewers (2018–2025) ===
==== 2018: Rookie season ====
Peralta began 2018 with the Colorado Springs Sky Sox and was called up to Milwaukee on May 13 to make his MLB debut. He debuted that same night against the Colorado Rockies at Coors Field. He recorded 13 strikeouts in 5 2/3 shutout innings, setting the Brewers franchise record for strikeouts by a first-time starter. For the season, he was 6–4 with a 4.25 ERA across 78 1/3 innings pitched. Of all MLB pitchers, he held right-handed batters to the lowest batting average, .110 (in 30 or more innings).

Peralta made his postseason debut in Game 4 of the 2018 National League Championship Series against the Los Angeles Dodgers. He pitched three innings, giving up zero hits and striking out six batters.

==== 2019 ====
On April 3, 2019, during a 1–0 victory over the Cincinnati Reds, Peralta pitched eight innings of shutout ball, and struck out Joey Votto in the first inning for the 100th strikeout of his career. Peralta suffered a shoulder joint injury in late April and quickly returned to the Brewers in May. After midseason struggles, he was optioned to San Antonio, though he returned to the Brewers in September. In 2019, Peralta made 39 appearances for the Brewers, registering a 7–3 record and 5.29 ERA with 115 strikeouts in 85 innings of work.

==== 2020 ====
On February 28, 2020, Peralta and the Brewers agreed to a five-year, $15.5 million contract extension. From September 24 to 26, he was placed on the paternity list for the birth of his daughter. In 2020, Peralta made 15 appearances for the Brewers, pitching to a 3–1 record and a 3.99 ERA with 47 strikeouts in 29 1/3 innings pitched.

Peralta made one appearance in Game 1 of the 2020 National League Wild Card Series against the Los Angeles Dodgers, where he pitched one inning and gave up one home run to Corey Seager.

==== 2021: First All-Star selection ====
In 2021, Peralta posted a 10–5 record and a 2.81 ERA with 195 strikeouts in 144 1/3 innings over 28 appearances. He was selected to participate in that year's All-Star Game, during which he struck out three consecutive batters in the seventh inning.

Peralta started Game 3 of the 2021 National League Division Series against the Atlanta Braves, where he pitched four innings with five strikouts and no earned runs.

==== 2022 ====
On May 16, 2022, during a 1–0 victory over the Atlanta Braves, Peralta pitched seven scoreless innings with 10 strikouts, and fanned Marcell Ozuna in the seventh inning for his 500th career strikeout. On June 14, Peralta was placed on the 60-day injured list with a latissimus dorsi injury. He was activated on August 3. In 2022, Peralta went 4–4 with a 3.58 ERA and 86 strikeouts in 78 innings of work.

==== 2023 ====
Peralta was named NL Pitcher of the Month in August of 2023 after pitching to a 5–0 record with a 2.10 ERA and 46 strikeouts across 30 innings pitched. In 2023, Peralta posted a 12–10 record and a 3.86 ERA with 210 strikeouts in 165 2/3 innings.

==== 2024 ====
On August 17, 2024, during a 2–1 victory over the Cleveland Guardians, Peralta pitched six innings and allowed only two hits to earn the 50th win of his career. In 2024, Peralta posted an 11–9 record and a 3.68 ERA with 200 strikeouts in 173 2/3 innings.

==== 2025: National League wins leader & second All-Star selection ====
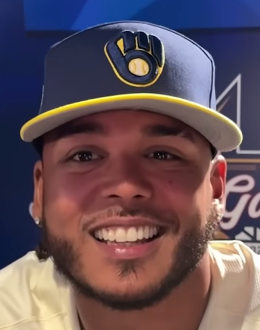
Peralta at the 2025 Major League Baseball All-Star Game

On May 12, 2025, Peralta recorded his 1,000th career strikeout when he struck out Daniel Schneemann in the bottom of the fifth inning against the Cleveland Guardians. He became the fourth Brewers pitcher to achieve that milestone. On July 6, Peralta was selected to pitch in his second All-Star Game after logging a 9–4 record with a 2.91 ERA across 18 starts.

He was named NL Pitcher of the Month in August, during which he recorded four wins in five starts (lasting five innings in two starts and six in the other three) with a 0.32 ERA, finishing the month with a 24-inning scoreless streak; the streak ended after 30 scoreless innings on Sept. 10, 2025. Throughout the August 2025 run, Peralta became the first-ever Brewer with four consecutive starts of at least five innings without surrendering a run; On September 22, Peralta struck out Jake Cronenworth for his 200th strikeout of the season, becoming the third pitcher in Brewers franchise history with at least three seasons of 200-plus strikeouts, joining Yovani Gallardo (4 in a row from 2009 to 2012) and Corbin Burnes (3 in a row from 2021 to 2023).

In 2025, Peralta posted a 17–6 record and a 2.70 ERA with 204 strikeouts in 176 2/3 innings. He led the National League with 17 wins, while recording the 4th-best ERA and the 6th-most strikeouts respectively. For these achievements, Peralta finished with the fifth most Cy Young Award votes at the end of the season.

Peralta earned the first postseason win of his career during Game 1 of the 2025 National League Division Series against the Chicago Cubs. He threw five innings, giving up two earned runs and striking out nine batters in a 9–3 victory over the Cubs. Peralta did not fare as well in his following two starts, as the Brewers lost Game 4 of the Division Series and Game 2 of the Championship Series against the Los Angeles Dodgers. Peralta started three games of the 2025 postseason, recording a 1–2 record with a 4.70 ERA and 19 strikeouts in 15 1/3 innings pitched.

At the end of his time with the team, Peralta was one of four pitchers in franchise history to strike out more than 1,000 batters. His 1,153 strikeouts as a Brewer placed him behind Yovani Gallardo's 1,226 and Brandon Woodruff's 1,206, and ahead of Teddy Higuera's 1,081. He also has the third-best career WHIP as a Brewers starter at 1.13, behind Woodruff's 1.02 and Corbin Burnes's 1.05.

=== New York Mets (2026) ===
On January 21, 2026, the Brewers traded Peralta and Tobias Myers to the New York Mets in exchange for Jett Williams and Brandon Sproat. Peralta was given the start on Opening Day, allowing two home runs to Brandon Lowe over five innings but ultimately earning the win against the Pittsburgh Pirates at Citi Field. Against his former team on July 20, pitching in Milwaukee, Peralta received a warm welcome from the crowd before allowing seven runs in less than six innings.

In 22 starts for the Mets, Peralta pitched to a 5–9 record with a 4.99 ERA and 113 strikeouts, and his strikeout percentage fell to 22.1%.

=== Tampa Bay Rays (2026) ===
On August 2, 2026, the Mets traded Peralta to the Tampa Bay Rays in exchange for Aidan Smith, Gary Gill Hill, and Émilien Pitre. He was named AL Pitcher of the Month for September, after posting a 4–0 record with a 0.96 ERA and 23 strikeouts across 28 innings pitched. In 10 starts for the Rays, Peralta pitched to a 5–2 record with a 3.25 ERA and 43 strikeouts.

Peralta started Game 2 of the ALDS against the New York Yankees, allowing only one run across 4 2/3 innings to ensure a 5–2 victory for the Rays. Peralta was later named ALCS MVP after the Rays defeated the Cleveland Guardians, 4 wins to 2 in the best-of-seven Championship Series. He started Game 2 and the conclusive Game 6, as well as making a relief appearance in Game 4, allowing only one run over the course of 12 innings during the series. Peralta recorded a 2–0 record with a 0.75 ERA and nine strikeouts across three ALCS games. He relied heavily on his four-seam fastball throughout the series, setting career highs for pitches of 97 mph or higher in each of his two starts. Peralta became the third Rays player to win ALCS MVP, joining Matt Garza (2008) and Randy Arozarena (2020).

In his sole World Series appearance, against his former team the Milwaukee Brewers, he started Game 3 and allowed five runs across 4 2/3 innings. The Rays lost the game 1–10 and fell to 0–3 in the series, before losing the series two days later in Game 5.

== Personal life ==
Peralta and his wife, Maritza, have one daughter together.

Peralta's brother, Luis, is also a professional baseball player.

== See also ==
- List of Major League Baseball annual wins leaders
- List of Major League Baseball career WHIP leaders
- List of Major League Baseball players from the Dominican Republic
- List of Milwaukee Brewers award winners and All-Stars
- List of World Series starting pitchers
- Tampa Bay Rays award winners and league leaders

Awards
Preceded by Corbin Burnes; Paul Skenes	National League Pitcher of the Month; August 2023; August 2025	Succeeded by Blake Snell; Yoshinobu Yamamoto
Preceded by Noah Cameron	American League Pitcher of the Month; September 2026	Most recent
