= 2009 World Baseball Classic Pool 2 =

Pool 2 of the Second Round of the 2009 World Baseball Classic was held at Dolphin Stadium, Miami Gardens, Florida, United States from March 14 to 18, 2009.

Like the first round, Pool 2 was a modified double-elimination tournament. The final two teams played against each other for seeding and both advanced to the semifinals.

== Bracket ==
Preliminaries
DR	Netherlands	1
CW	Venezuela	3
CR	United States	1
DW	Puerto Rico	11
Lower round 1
L1	Netherlands	3
L2	United States	9

Qualifiers
W1	Venezuela	2
W2	Puerto Rico	0
Lower final
W3	United States	6
L4	Puerto Rico	5

Seeding
W4	Venezuela	10
W5	United States	6

== Results ==
- All times are Eastern Daylight Time (UTC−04:00).

=== Venezuela 3, Netherlands 1 ===
March 14 13:00 at Dolphin Stadium
Team	1	2	3	4	5	6	7	8	9	R	H	E
Netherlands	0	1	0	0	0	0	0	0	0	1	6	0
Venezuela	1	0	0	1	0	0	0	1	X	3	3	2
WP: Carlos Silva (1–0) LP: Sidney Ponson (1–1) Sv: Francisco Rodríguez (2); Home runs: NED: None; VEN: Miguel Cabrera (1), José López (1); Attendance: 17,345 (45.0%); Umpires: HP − Ed Rapuano, 1B − Masato Tomoyose, 2B − Bruce Dreckman, 3B − Hitoshi Watarida; Boxscore

=== Puerto Rico 11, United States 1 ===
March 14 20:00 at Dolphin Stadium
Team	1	2	3	4	5	6	7	8	9	R	H	E
United States	0	0	0	0	1	0	0	X	X	1	6	0
Puerto Rico	2	4	0	0	1	0	4	X	X	11	13	0
WP: Javier Vázquez (2–0) LP: Jake Peavy (0–1); Home runs: USA: None; PUR: Felipe López (1), Carlos Beltrán (1); Attendance: 30,595 (79.3%); Umpires: HP − Mark Wegner, 1B − Luis Ramírez, 2B − Bruce Dreckman, 3B − Masato Tomoyose; Notes: Completed early due to 10–run mercy rule after 7 innings. Two outs when last run scored. Boxscore

=== United States 9, Netherlands 3 ===
March 15 19:30 at Dolphin Stadium
Team	1	2	3	4	5	6	7	8	9	R	H	E
Netherlands	0	0	0	0	0	0	1	2	0	3	12	1
United States	1	2	0	3	1	1	0	1	X	9	12	1
WP: Roy Oswalt (1–0) LP: Rick VandenHurk (0–1); Home runs: NED: Bryan Engelhardt (1); USA: Jimmy Rollins (1), Adam Dunn (1); Attendance: 11,059 (28.7%); Umpires: HP − Bruce Dreckman, 1B − Hitoshi Watarida, 2B − Ed Rapuano, 3B − Luis Ramírez; Boxscore

=== Venezuela 2, Puerto Rico 0 ===
March 16 20:00 at Dolphin Stadium
Team	1	2	3	4	5	6	7	8	9	R	H	E
Venezuela	0	0	1	0	0	0	1	0	0	2	8	0
Puerto Rico	0	0	0	0	0	0	0	0	0	0	5	0
WP: Félix Hernández (2–0) LP: Ian Snell (0–1) Sv: Francisco Rodríguez (3); Home runs: VEN: Ramón Hernández (1); PUR: None; Attendance: 25,599 (66.4%); Umpires: HP − Ed Rapuano, 1B − Masato Tomoyose, 2B − Mark Wegner, 3B − Hitoshi Watarida; Boxscore

=== United States 6, Puerto Rico 5 ===
March 17 19:00 at Dolphin Stadium
Team	1	2	3	4	5	6	7	8	9	R	H	E
Puerto Rico	0	1	0	2	0	1	0	0	1	5	5	1
United States	0	2	1	0	0	0	0	0	3	6	10	0
WP: Jonathan Broxton (1–0) LP: J. C. Romero (1–1); Home runs: PUR: Alex Ríos (1), Carlos Delgado (1); USA: Kevin Youkilis (1); Attendance: 13,224 (34.3%); Umpires: HP − Mark Wegner, 1B − Luis Ramírez, 2B − Ed Rapuano, 3B − Masato Tomoyose; Notes: One out when winning run scored. Boxscore

=== Venezuela 10, United States 6 ===
March 18 19:00 at Dolphin Stadium
Team	1	2	3	4	5	6	7	8	9	R	H	E
United States	0	1	1	1	2	1	0	0	0	6	12	3
Venezuela	0	6	0	1	0	3	0	0	X	10	15	1
WP: Armando Galarraga (1–0) LP: Jeremy Guthrie (0–2); Home runs: USA: Mark DeRosa (1); VEN: Max Ramírez (1); Attendance: 16,575 (43.0%); Umpires: HP − Bruce Dreckman, 1B − Hitoshi Watarida, 2B − Mark Wegner, 3B − Luis Ramírez; Boxscore
