= Edwin Moscoso =

American baseball umpire

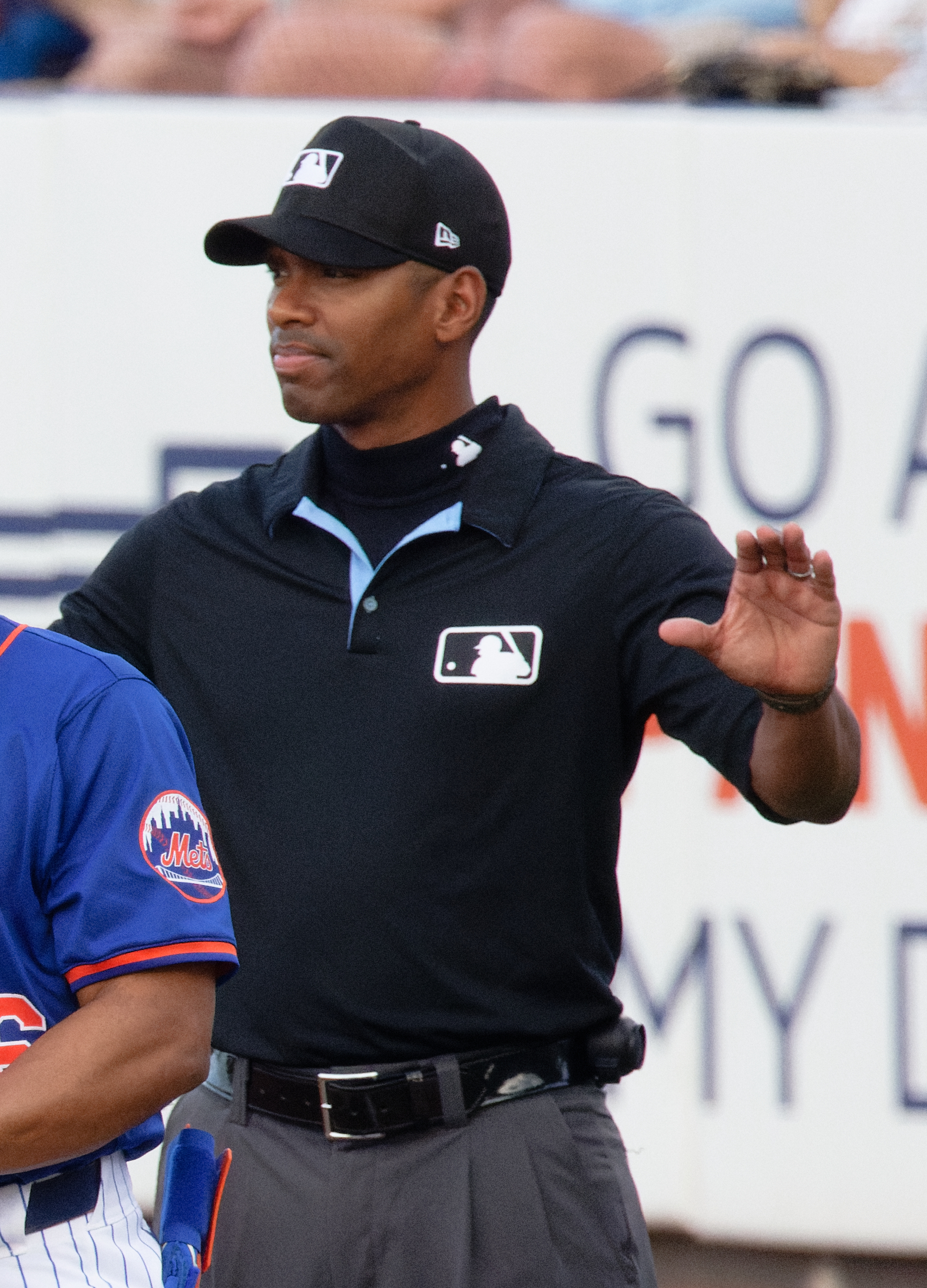
- Moscoso in 2024

MLB – No. 32
- Umpire
- Born: May 6, 1990 (age 36); Caracas, Venezuela

MLB debut
- July 23, 2020

Crew information
- Umpiring crew: P
- Crew members: #19 Vic Carapazza (crew chief); #21 Hunter Wendelstedt; #59 Nic Lentz; #32 Edwin Moscoso

Career highlights and awards
- Special assignments: League Championship Series (2026); Division Series (2024, 2025); Wild Card Games/Series (2023, 2026); All-Star Games (2026); Home plate umpire for Domingo Germán's perfect game (June 28, 2023)

Edwin Abenis Moscoso is a Venezuelan professional baseball umpire. He has been an umpire in Major League Baseball since 2020. Moscoso wears uniform number 32.

== Career ==
Moscoso began his professional career in 2014 after attending the MiLB Umpire Training Academy. He spent time in the Gulf Coast League, New York–Penn League, Florida State League, Southern League, and Pacific Coast League, as well as three seasons in the Venezuelan Professional Baseball League. He worked the 2018 All-Star Futures Game, the first Venezuelan to do so.

He made his major league debut on July 23, 2020, at Dodger Stadium. He umpired the game between the San Francisco Giants and the Los Angeles Dodgers alongside Bill Miller, Doug Eddings, and Rob Drake. He was hired as a full time MLB umpire in 2023.

Moscoso’s first postseason assignment was the 2023 National League Wild Card Series. In 2024 he worked the National League Division Series alongside Carlos Torres, marking the first MLB postseason series featuring two Venezuelan umpires on the same crew.

He was the home plate umpire for Domingo Germán's perfect game on June 28, 2023.

== Personal life ==
Moscoso grew up in the town of Palo Negro within Libertador Municipality. He is married and has a daughter. He studied chemical engineering at the University of Carabobo.

== See also ==
- List of Major League Baseball umpires (disambiguation)
