= Domingo Germán's perfect game =

2023 Major League Baseball game

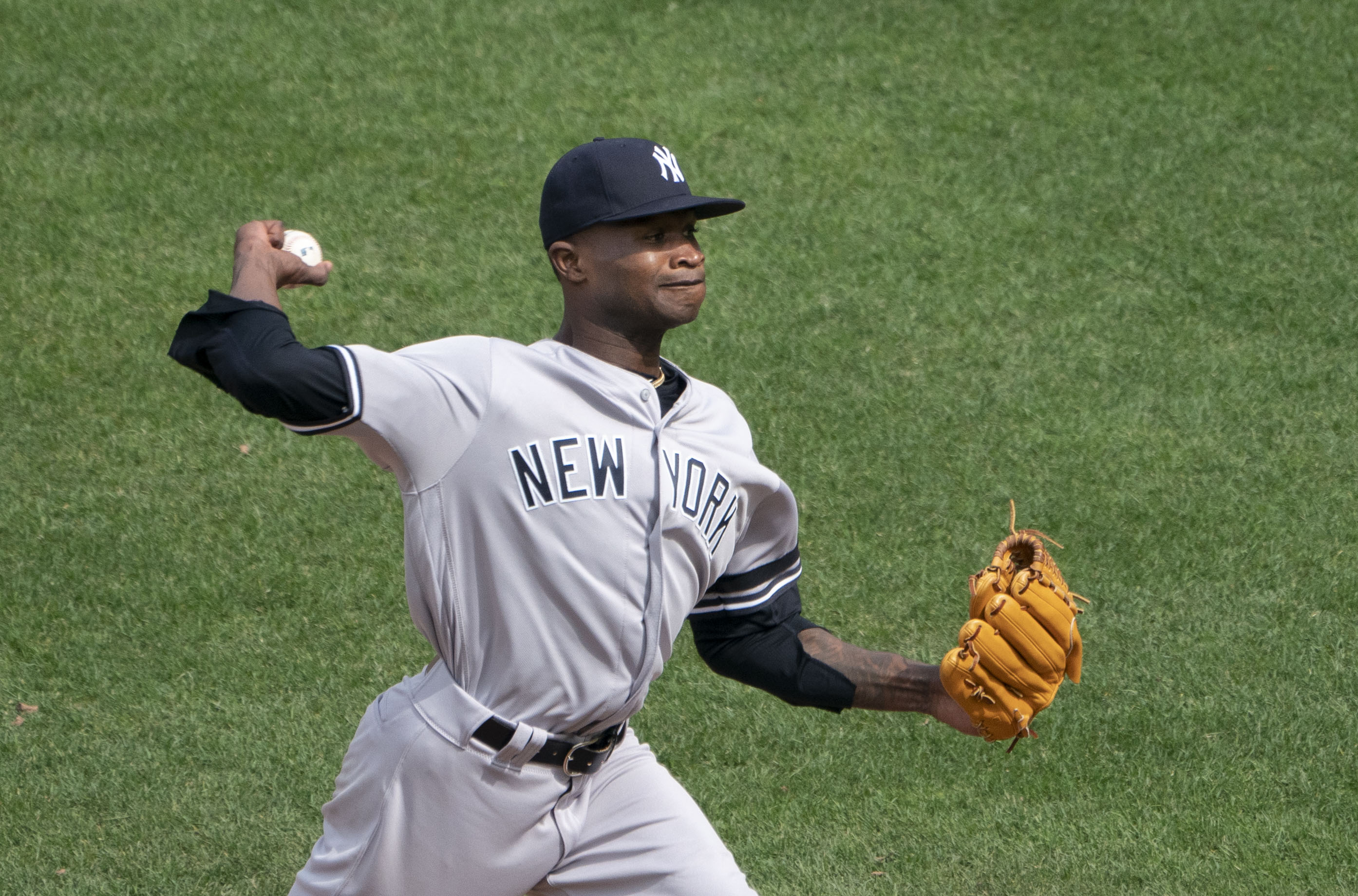
- Domingo Germán with the Yankees in 2019
New York Yankees	Oakland Athletics
11	0
	1	2	3	4	5	6	7	8	9	R	H	E
New York Yankees	0	0	0	1	6	0	1	0	3	11	11	0
Oakland Athletics	0	0	0	0	0	0	0	0	0	0	0	3
- Date: June 28, 2023
- Venue: Oakland Coliseum
- City: Oakland, California
- Managers: Aaron Boone (New York Yankees); Mark Kotsay (Oakland Athletics)
- Umpires: HP: Edwin Moscoso; 1B: Nate Tomlinson; 2B: Jordan Baker; 3B: Chris Guccione
- Attendance: 12,479
- Television: NBC Sports California (Athletics); YES Network (Yankees)
- TV announcers: NBC Sports California: Johnny Doskow (play-by-play); Dallas Braden (color commentary); YES Network: Ryan Ruocco (play-by-play); Jeff Nelson (color commentary)
- Radio: English: KNEW 960 (Athletics) WFAN 660 (Yankees); Spanish: KIQI 1010 (Athletics) WADO 1280 (Yankees)
- Radio announcers: WFAN: Justin Shackil (play-by-play), Suzyn Waldman (color commentary)

On June 28, 2023, Domingo Germán of the New York Yankees pitched the 24th perfect game in Major League Baseball history, and the fourth in Yankees franchise history. Germán pitched it during an 11–0 win against the Oakland Athletics at the Oakland Coliseum in Oakland, California.

With Germán's perfect game, the Yankees became the first MLB franchise with four perfect games pitched. Oakland Coliseum joined the original Yankee Stadium as the only venues to host three perfect games. The game's color commentary for the Athletics' broadcast was done by former Athletics pitcher Dallas Braden, who threw a perfect game himself in 2010.

== Background ==
=== Perfect game ===
In Major League Baseball (MLB), a perfect game occurs when a pitcher faces and retires the minimum number of opposing batters – 27 across nine innings without any batter safely reaching first base. While a no-hitter may allow opposing batters to reach base on a walk, hit by pitch, uncaught third strike, fielder's choice, or error, none of these occur in a perfect game. Pitching a perfect game is one of the rarest feats in baseball, with only 24 instances officially recognized by MLB since 1876. Prior to Germán's perfect game, the most recent occurrence was almost 11 years prior, on August 15, 2012, when Félix Hernández of the Seattle Mariners pitched one against the Tampa Bay Rays.

=== Domingo Germán ===
Domingo Germán made his MLB debut with the New York Yankees in 2017, and by the 2019 season, he had joined the team's regular starting rotation. In January 2020, MLB suspended Germán for 81 games under the league's domestic violence policy, which caused him to miss the entirety of the pandemic-shortened season. He struggled with shoulder injuries during the next two seasons, but returned partway through 2022 and ended the year with a 2–5 win–loss record and 3.61 earned run average (ERA) in 16 games (15 starts). By 2023, the Yankees did not see Germán as a regular starter until other pitchers in the organization were sidelined by injury.

Germán struggled in the lead-up to his perfect game, entering his start with a 4–5 record and 5.10 ERA. After being warned about MLB's policy on sticky substances in April, he was suspended for 10 games in May under a violation of that same policy. On June 16, Germán lasted only two innings against the Boston Red Sox, allowing seven earned runs in the process, and on June 22, the start before his perfect game, he was booed off the pitcher's mound after giving up a career-high 10 runs in 3 1/3 innings against the Seattle Mariners.

== Game ==
Germán threw 99 pitches, including 51 curveballs. He struck out nine batters. Yankees catcher Kyle Higashioka, who had also caught a no-hitter thrown by Corey Kluber in 2021, said after the game, "I was a passenger for this one ... Domingo was definitely driving the ship." The New York Yankees scored 11 runs, surpassing the 10 runs scored by the San Francisco Giants in Matt Cain's perfect game in 2012 for the most run support ever in a perfect game. The game ended as Esteury Ruiz grounded to third baseman Josh Donaldson, who threw to first baseman Anthony Rizzo to record the final out.

Germán recorded his 500th career strikeout during the game. It was the fourth perfect game in Yankees history, after games thrown by Don Larsen in 1956, David Wells in 1998, and David Cone in 1999. As the Yankees would fail to make the postseason in 2023, it marked the first time a Yankees pitcher threw a perfect game and they didn't proceed to win the World Series. It was the first perfect game in MLB since Félix Hernández's perfect game on August 15, 2012, the first since the implementation of the pitch clock, and the first thrown by a pitcher from the Dominican Republic.

There were 12,479 fans in attendance for the game at Oakland Coliseum, with many fans favoring the Yankees. The game was televised locally on the YES Network and NBC Sports California. Dallas Braden, a former Athletics pitcher who pitched a perfect game in 2010, was the Athletics' color commentator on NBC Sports California. Ryan Ruocco, substituting for Michael Kay, called the game on the YES Network, while Justin Shackil, substituting for John Sterling, called the play-by-play on WFAN.

== Game statistics ==
June 28, 2023 at Oakland Coliseum in Oakland, California
Team	1	2	3	4	5	6	7	8	9	R	H	E
New York Yankees (44–36)	0	0	0	1	6	0	1	0	3	11	11	0
Oakland Athletics (21–61)	0	0	0	0	0	0	0	0	0	0	0	3
WP: Domingo Germán (5–5) LP: JP Sears (1–6); Home runs: NYY: Giancarlo Stanton (7); OAK: None

Hitting
New York	AB	R	H	RBI	BB	SO	AVG
DJ LeMahieu, 2B	5	1	1	1	0	0	.226
Gleyber Torres, DH	4	1	0	0	1	2	.246
Anthony Rizzo, 1B	4	2	0	0	1	1	.268
Giancarlo Stanton, RF	3	1	2	3	1	1	.197
Oswaldo Cabrera, PR	1	2	1	0	0	0	.193
Harrison Bader, CF	5	1	2	0	0	1	.252
Josh Donaldson, 3B	4	0	1	2	0	3	.139
Isiah Kiner-Falefa, LF	3	1	1	2	2	0	.241
Kyle Higashioka, C	5	1	1	1	0	0	.211
Anthony Volpe, SS	4	1	2	0	0	0	.208
Totals	38	11	11	9	5	8	.218

=== Batting ===
- 2B: Donaldson (1, Long); Higashioka (7, Sears); Bader (3, Sears); Volpe (10, Fujinami)
- HR: Stanton (7, 4th inning off Sears 0 on, 2 Out)
- RBI: Donaldson 2 (11), Higashioka (19), Stanton 3 (17), LeMahieu (26), Kiner-Falefa 2 (19)
- 2-Out RBI: Stanton, Kiner-Falefa
- SF: Donaldson
- GIDP: Kiner-Falefa
- Team LOB: 6
- Team RISP: 5-for-17.

=== Baserunning ===
- SB: Volpe (16, 3rd base off Sears/Langeliers)

Pitching
New York	IP	H	R	ER	BB	SO	HR	ERA
Domingo Germán (W, 5–5)	9	0	0	0	0	9	0	4.54
Totals	9	0	0	0	0	9	0	4.54

Hitting
Oakland	AB	R	H	RBI	BB	SO	AVG
Tony Kemp, 2B	3	0	0	0	0	0	.179
Ryan Noda, 1B	3	0	0	0	0	3	.232
Brent Rooker, LF	3	0	0	0	0	2	.236
Carlos Pérez, DH	3	0	0	0	0	0	.235
Seth Brown, RF	3	0	0	0	0	0	.187
Jonah Bride, 3B	3	0	0	0	0	2	.200
Aledmys Díaz, SS	3	0	0	0	0	0	.201
Shea Langeliers, C	3	0	0	0	0	1	.198
Esteury Ruiz, CF	3	0	0	0	0	1	.260
Totals	27	0	0	0	0	9	.214

=== Fielding ===
- DP: 1 (Díaz-Kemp-Noda)
- E: Sears (1, throw); Noda (3, fielding); Bride (1, throw)

Pitching
Oakland	IP	H	R	ER	BB	SO	HR	ERA
JP Sears (L, 1–6)	4	5	7	5	3	5	1	4.43
Shintaro Fujinami	2	0	0	0	0	2	0	10.04
Yacksel Ríos	0	0	1	1	1	0	0	37.80
Austin Pruitt	2	1	0	0	0	0	0	3.51
Sam Long	1	2	3	3	1	1	0	3.82
Totals	9	11	11	9	5	8	1	11.92

=== Other statistics ===
- WP: Fujinami.
- Pitches-strikes: Germán 99–72; Sears 92–55; Fujinami 30–18; Ríos, Y 3–0; Pruitt 20–13; Long 33–21.
- Groundouts-flyouts: Germán 8–7; Sears 2–2; Fujinami 0–0; Ríos, Y 0–0; Pruitt 4–1; Long 2–0.
- Batters faced: Germán 27; Sears 21; Fujinami 9; Ríos, Y 1; Pruitt 6; Long 7.
- Inherited runners-scored: Fujinami 3–3; Pruitt 1–1.

== Other information ==
Alexandra Irving became the first woman in Major League Baseball history to be an official scorer for any perfect game with this game.

== See also ==
- List of Major League Baseball no-hitters
- List of Major League Baseball perfect games
