= Wendelstedt =

Wendelstedt is a surname. Notable people with the name include:

- Harry Wendelstedt (1938–2012), American baseball umpire
- Hunter Wendelstedt (born 1971), American baseball umpire
