= Nate Tomlinson =

American baseball umpire (born 1990)

MLB – No. 34
- Umpire
- Born: September 20, 1990 (age 36); Waupaca, Wisconsin, US

MLB debut
- August 7, 2020

Crew information
- Umpiring crew: K
- Crew members: #14 Mark Wegner (crew chief); #1 Bruce Dreckman; #37 Carlos Torres; #34 Nate Tomlinson

Career highlights and awards
- Special assignments: Wild Card Games/Series (2026); Division Series (2025); MLB Little League Classic (2025)

Nathan Richard Tomlinson (born September 20, 1990) is an American professional baseball umpire. He has been an umpire in Major League Baseball since 2020, and wears uniform number 34.

== Career ==
Tomlinson graduated from umpire school in 2010, and subsequently worked in the Coastal Plains and Northwoods leagues. He was hired by Minor League Baseball (MiLB) in 2011, working in the Arizona League, Northwest League, Midwest League, Florida State League, Texas League, and Pacific Coast League. He made his major league debut on August 7, 2020, at Globe Life Field. He umpired the game between the Los Angeles Angels and the Texas Rangers alongside Doug Eddings, Bill Miller, and Edwin Moscoso.

On June 14, 2022, Tomlinson was injured during the ninth inning of the game between the Angels and the Los Angeles Dodgers. He was working home plate when Mike Trout’s bat snapped at the handle during the backswing. The jagged narrow portion fit through the eye gap on Tomlinson’s facemask, hitting him in the nose and narrowly missing his left eye. He was hospitalized, and crew chief Laz Díaz filled in as home plate umpire for the remainder of the game. In a post-game interview, Dodgers manager Dave Roberts remarked that the incident was "really scary" and that the bat hitting his nose was "the best case scenario".

He was the first base umpire for Domingo Germán's perfect game on June 28, 2023.

Tomlinson was hired as a full-time MLB umpire on June 16, 2024. Prior to the 2025 season, he wore uniform number 114.

== Personal life ==
Tomlinson played youth baseball and began umpiring in his early teenage years. He graduated from Waupaca High School in 2009, and attended University of Wisconsin–Stevens Point as an active MiLB umpire.

== See also ==
- List of major league baseball umpires
