= Nic Lentz =

American baseball umpire (born 1989)

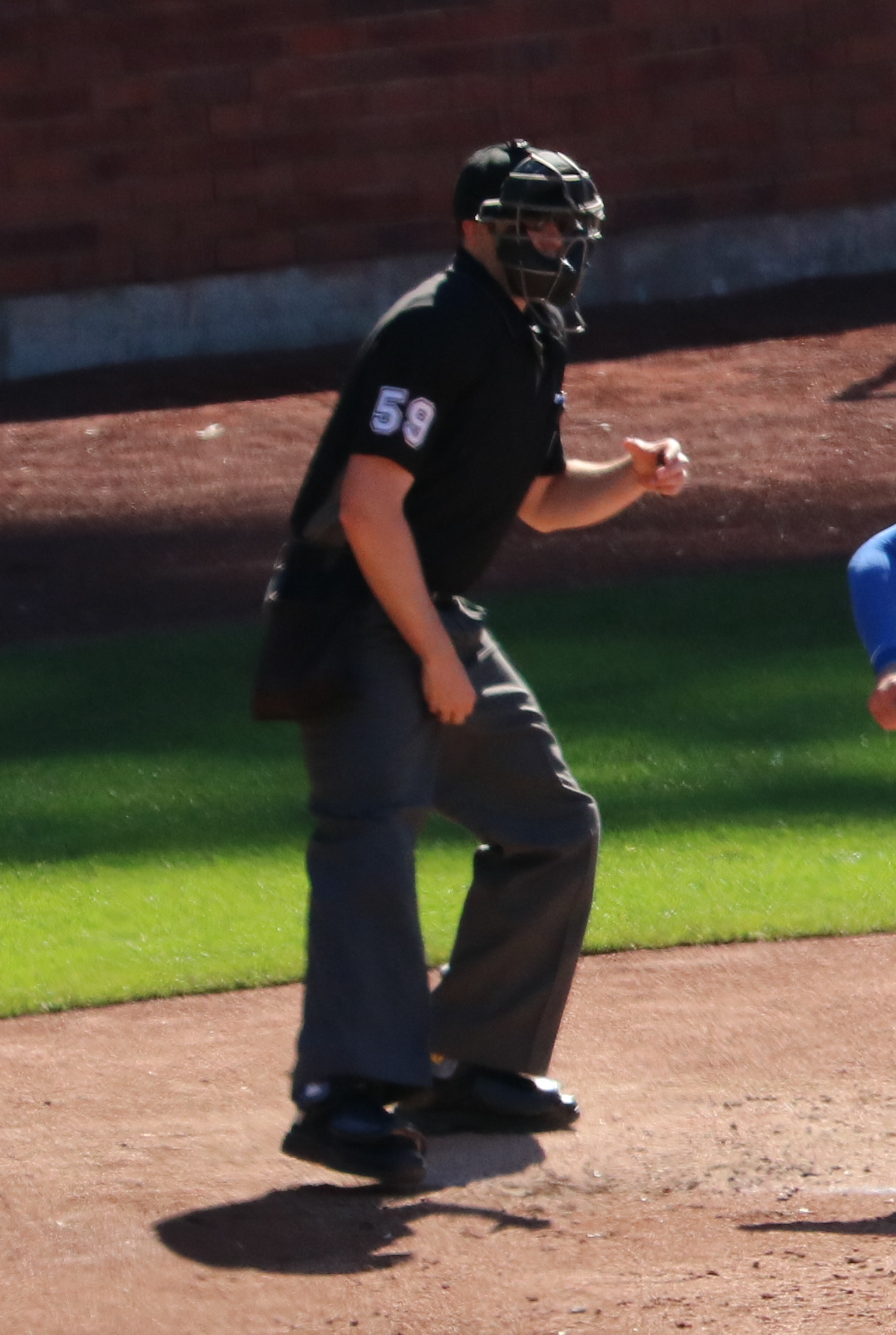
- Lentz in 2018

MLB – No. 59
- Umpire
- Born: December 28, 1989 (age 36); Grand Rapids, Michigan, U.S.

MLB debut
- April 20, 2016

Crew information
- Umpiring crew: P
- Crew members: #19 Vic Carapazza (crew chief); #21 Hunter Wendelstedt; #59 Nic Lentz; #32 Edwin Moscoso

Career highlights and awards
- Special assignments: World Series (2026); League Championship Series (2024); Division Series (2022, 2023, 2025, 2026); Wild Card Games/Series (2024); All-Star Games (2024); World Baseball Classic (2023); Triple-A All-Star Game (2017); Called a perfect game on April 30, 2025.

Nicolas James Lentz (born December 28, 1989) is an American umpire in Major League Baseball. He made his debut on April 20, 2016, in Miami. He wears number 59.

During the 2016 season, Lentz umpired 105 MLB games, 24 as the home plate umpire. Lentz's first MLB ejection came on May 17, 2017, when he ejected St. Louis Cardinals' manager Mike Matheny. In July 2017, Lentz was the first base umpire for the Triple-A All-Star Game. He umpired 109 MLB games during the 2017 season, 25 behind the plate.

On August 31, 2018, Lentz ejected New York Yankees' manager Aaron Boone. Boone, who had been in the dugout, was displeased with a strike call Lentz made during a Gleyber Torres at-bat. Boone came on to the field and became quite animated, including crouching behind home plate in a catcher's stance, apparently demonstrating to Lentz the difference between balls and strikes.

On April 30, 2025, Lentz called a “perfect game” as home plate umpire, with 129 of 129 taken pitches called correctly.

== See also ==
- List of Major League Baseball umpires (disambiguation)
