= Suzyn Waldman =

American sportscaster (born 1946)

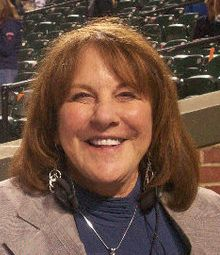
- Waldman in 2011
- Born: September 7, 1946 (age 80); Newton, Massachusetts, U.S.
- Education: Simmons University
- Occupation: Sportscaster
- Years active: 1987–present

Suzyn Waldman (born September 7, 1946) is an American sportscaster and former musical theater actress. Since the 2005 season, she has been the color commentator for New York Yankees baseball, working with John Sterling, Justin Shackil and Dave Sims on radio broadcasts, first for WCBS-AM and then for WFAN in New York City.

As of 2026, she is in her 40th season covering the Yankees.

== Early life and singing career ==
Waldman was born in Newton, Massachusetts, the daughter of Jeanne and Philip Waldman. She loved baseball from childhood; she recalls going to a game with her grandfather when she was three and a half years old. She also has joked that she chose Simmons College because it was near Fenway Park. She graduated from Simmons with a degree in economics.

Prior to her broadcasting career, Waldman worked as an actress and singer in musical theater. Her most notable role was as Dulcinea in Man of La Mancha. Her rendition of "There Used To Be a Ballpark" appeared on historian David Pietrusza's 1995 WMHT-TV documentary Local Heroes: Baseball on Capital Region Diamonds. She has performed the National Anthem at a number of Yankee home games, most recently in April 2021, as well as before Game 7 of the 1986 American League Championship Series at Fenway Park.

== Broadcasting career ==
Waldman is considered a pioneer in the male-dominated field of sports broadcasting.

=== Early years (1987–2001) ===
Waldman has worked in sports reporting for over than 35 years. Her voice—on a live sports update—was the first heard on WFAN when it premiered on 1050 AM at 3:00 PM on July 1, 1987 (it moved to 660 AM a year later). At WFAN, she covered both the Yankees and the New York Knicks. She is one of the first "beat reporters" to have been a broadcaster rather than a writer. Waldman covered the 1989 World Series for the station, reporting live on the Loma Prieta earthquake; her phone line stayed on throughout the earthquake, allowing her to report back to New York on the situation.

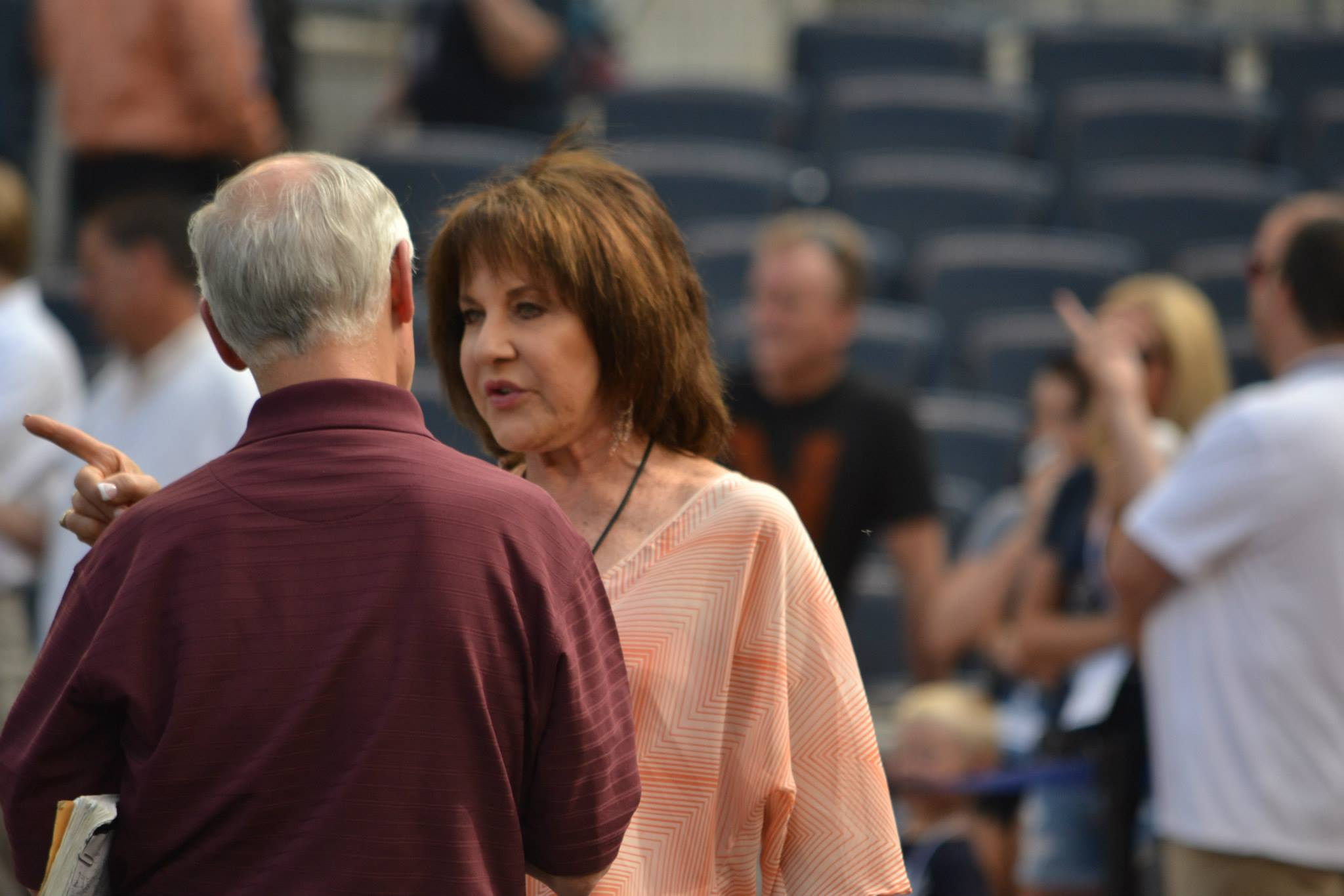
Waldman in 2014

Waldman hosted the WFAN midday show from May 2000 until November 2001, when she resigned her position to join the newly-formed YES Network.

==== New York Yankees (1987–present) ====
Having covered the team since 1987, from 1995 until 2001, she was a play-by-play announcer for the Yankees' local TV broadcasts on WPIX, which made her the second woman to serve in that capacity on TV for a major league team, after Gayle Gardner in 1993. Waldman was the clubhouse reporter for the YES Network's Yankees pre- and post-game shows, the clubhouse reporter, and also did play-by-play for the network, between 2002 and 2004. Her play-by-play role was significantly reduced over the course of her three years at YES, as the network felt she was more suited for a studio role.

==== Yankees Radio Network (2005–present) ====
Following the 2004 American League Championship Series Charley Steiner left the Yankees radio booth to join the Los Angeles Dodgers, and Waldman was hired to join John Sterling. She made her debut in a spring training game on March 6, 2005 as the first female radio broadcaster in the franchise's history. According to the Yankees, Waldman was major league baseball's first full-time female color commentator. She has been the regular color commentator and analyst for radio broadcasts ever since. She called the Yankees' victory in the 2009 World Series, becoming the first woman to broadcast the Fall Classic.

Following the 2013 season, the Yankees moved their radio rights from WCBS to WFAN, and announced that Waldman and Sterling would return for their tenth year together in the broadcast booth. She signed a two-year contract extension in February 2016 that ran through the 2017 season.

On December 16, 2017, Waldman signed a contract through the 2018 season. She is currently under contract through the 2026 season.

From June 29–30, 2019, Waldman called the first MLB games played in Europe, when the Yankees played the Red Sox in London.

On September 9, 2023, Waldman hosted a "Question-and-Answer" event with the 1998 Yankees at the team's annual Old Timers' Day, which was held in lieu of the traditional exhibition game. She called the 2024 World Series alongside Sterling, as the Yankees lost to the Los Angeles Dodgers in five games.

In 2025 Waldman began calling games with Dave Sims, following Sterling's retirement.

Waldman also hosts the Yankees pre-game show on WFAN.

Her long association with the Yankees has earned her the nickname "Ma Pinstripe" from New York Daily News writer Bob Raissman.

=== Controveries ===
==== George Bell incident ====
At the start of the 1987 Major League Baseball season, Toronto Blue Jays outfielder George Bell was not talking to the New York media, thinking they had cost him the Most Valuable Player award the year earlier. He broke his silence after a win at Yankee Stadium, and the regular beat writers hurriedly gathered around his locker. New on the beat (women had just recently been allowed access to the locker room), Waldman joined the group; Bell immediately started screaming at her in Spanish and English.

"There was a deathly silence. I think the other writers were shocked, but I also think they still resented me more than a bit, and they certainly didn't want to lose this interview," she recalled on a radio show. "At the time, I was a little less tough than I am now. Tears welled up in my eyes and I said I better get out of there."

As she rushed to leave, Bell's teammate Jesse Barfield called out to her: "Suzyn, I went three for four today. Don't you want to ask me any questions?" Waldman and Barfield became friends and have remained close since then.

==== Yogi Berra–George Steinbrenner feud ====
In 1985, Yankees owner George Steinbrenner sent his general manager, Clyde King, to fire manager Yogi Berra. This greatly angered Berra because in his previous firings, Steinbrenner had personally delivered the news. Berra vowed not to visit Yankee Stadium and not to participate in any Yankee function as long as George Steinbrenner was the owner of the Yankees.

In 1999, Waldman helped arrange a meeting between the two men that brought an end to the 14-year feud. Yogi returned on Opening Day of the 1999 season, a day also designated as "Joe DiMaggio Day."

==== Roger Clemens ====
On May 6, 2007, Roger Clemens appeared at Yankee Stadium to announce his return to the team that season. The surprise announcement, which caught Waldman offguard, resulted in an extremely excited, raw reaction on-air, where she exclaimed "Roger Clemens is in George's box!" Waldman was lampooned by radio hosts such as Opie and Anthony for her over-the-top reaction.

==== Tears on air ====
Later that year, after the Yankees lost to the Cleveland Indians in Game 5 of the 2007 American League Division Series, Waldman cried while covering Joe Torre's postgame press conference. Criticized for what was described in many media outlets as "unprofessional", Waldman defended her emotions, pointing to the bond she shared with Torre as cancer survivors.

== Awards and honors ==
Waldman and Sterling were jointly inducted into the New York State Broadcasters Association Hall of Fame in 2016. That same year, she was honored with a plaque by the Yankees for 30 years covering the franchise.

She received an honorary Doctor of Journalism from Simmons University in May 2021. She was selected for induction into the Radio Hall of Fame on July 25, 2022. In 2024, she was given the Gracies Lifetime Achievement Award from the Alliance for Women in Media Foundation.

Waldman and Sterling were honored in a few stadium giveaways in the 2020s. In 2022, the Yankees released a talking bobblehead of them. In 2023, the team released a "John & Suzyn" t-shirt, and in celebration of the duo's 20th anniversary together, the team featured them on another commemorative t-shirt that contained the phrase, "That's baseball Suzyn", one of Sterling's popular phrases.

== Personal life ==
In 1996, Waldman was diagnosed with breast cancer. She sued Mount Sinai Hospital and two of its pathologists for misdiagnosing her as cancer-free, eventually winning over $2 million in damages from the case. While her chemotherapy regimen limited (and eventually ended) her day-to-day role of broadcasting Yankees games on TV, she continued in her role at WFAN throughout her illness. Her cancer has been in remission for several years.

Waldman is a resident of Croton-on-Hudson in Westchester County, New York. She is Jewish, choosing not to work Rosh Hashanah.
