= 2026 National League Championship Series =

- American Family Field during game 2
Team (Wins)	Managers	Season
Milwaukee Brewers (4)	Pat Murphy	103–59 (.636), GA: 14
Los Angeles Dodgers (0)	Dave Roberts	100–62 (.617), GA: 9
- Dates: October 11–15
- MVP: Jake Bauers (Milwaukee)
- Umpires: Ryan Additon, Edwin Moscoso, Alan Porter, David Rackley, Chris Segal, John Tumpane, Mark Wegner (crew chief)

Broadcast
- Television: Fox (United States – Games 1–2); FS1 (United States – Games 2–4); J Sports 3 (Japan – Games 1, 3, and 4); J Sports 2 (Japan – Game 2); NHK BS (Japan – All Games); SPOTV (Japan – All Games)
- TV announcers: Joe Davis, John Smoltz, Ken Rosenthal, and Tom Verducci (Fox/FS1); So Taguchi and Ken Ikeno (NHK BS)
- Radio: ESPN
- Radio announcers: Jon Sciambi and Doug Glanville
- NLDS: Milwaukee Brewers over San Diego Padres (3–1); Los Angeles Dodgers over Atlanta Braves (3–1)

The 2026 National League Championship Series (NLCS) was the best-of-seven playoff in Major League Baseball's 2026 postseason between the second-seeded Los Angeles Dodgers and the overall #1 seed Milwaukee Brewers in a rematch of last year's matchup for the National League (NL) pennant and the right to play in the 2026 World Series. The series began on October 11 and ended on October 15. The Brewers overcame a deficit in all four games and held the Dodgers to just one home run to defeat them in a four-game sweep to become National League (NL) champions and advance to the World Series for the first time since 1982, ending what was the third longest pennant drought in the majors at the time. Jake Bauers won the NLCS MVP, the first time for a Brewer, batting .286 in the series with six RBI, which included three during the decisive Game 4 to secure the sweep, along with having two long plate appearances against Yoshinobu Yamamoto and Blake Snell, which led to a walk and a home run, respectively. This was the second straight year with a sweep in an NLCS.

Fox, Fox Deportes and FS1 televised the games in the United States with streaming on Fox One.

The Brewers would go on to defeat the American League champion Tampa Bay Rays in the 2026 World Series in five games, earning their first World Series title in franchise history.

== Background ==
The Milwaukee Brewers (103–59) clinched their fourth consecutive postseason berth and the eighth postseason berth in the last nine seasons (2018–2021; 2023–2026) on September 11, won National League Central for the fourth consecutive season on September 15, clinched a first-round bye on September 22, and home-field advantage throughout the entire MLB playoffs on September 24. In National League Division Series, they defeated the San Diego Padres in four games, with the clinching game snapping a record 12-game road postseason losing streak. This was the Brewers' fifth League Championship Series (LCS), having played in one ALCS (1982) and three other NLCS (2011, 2018, 2025, 2026). The Brewers looked to win their first NL pennant and secure their first World Series berth since 1982.

The Los Angeles Dodgers (100–62) extended their postseason streak to 14 consecutive seasons (2013–2026), the longest postseason streak currently in North American team sports, and tied for the longest in MLB history with the 1991–2005 Atlanta Braves. (Note: The Braves streak was 14 seasons over 15 years due to the 1994-95 strike which cancelled the 1994 playoffs.) They also won the National League West for the fifth straight season and 13th time in 14 seasons and first-round bye. In the Division Series, they defeated the Atlanta Braves in four games. This was the Dodgers' 18th NLCS appearance, one short of the New York Yankees for most LCS appearances, with eight appearances coming in the last 11 seasons. The two-time defending champion Dodgers were looking to make their sixth World Series appearance in the last 10 years.

This was the seventh re-match in the NLCS in consecutive years, following the Dodgers–Braves in 2020–2021, Cubs–Dodgers in 2016–2017, Dodgers–Phillies in 2008–2009, Astros–Cardinals in 2004–2005, Braves–Pirates in 1991–1992, and the Dodgers–Phillies again in 1977–1978. This was also the first postseason series between two 100-win teams since the 2021 NLDS between the Los Angeles Dodgers and San Francisco Giants.

Milwaukee won the season series against Los Angeles, 4–3. This series marked the fourth postseason meeting between the two teams, with the Dodgers winning all three previous match-ups (the 2018 NLCS, 2020 Wild Card Series, and the 2025 NLCS).

== Summary ==
Milwaukee won the series, 4–0.

Game	Date	Score	Location	Time	Attendance
1	October 11	Los Angeles Dodgers – 1, Milwaukee Brewers – 2	American Family Field	2:55	42,617
2	October 12	Los Angeles Dodgers – 4, Milwaukee Brewers – 7	American Family Field	3:21	42,516
3	October 14	Milwaukee Brewers – 6, Los Angeles Dodgers – 2	Dodger Stadium	3:02	50,708
4	October 15	Milwaukee Brewers – 6, Los Angeles Dodgers – 4	Dodger Stadium	2:59	49,104

== Game summaries ==
=== Game 1 ===
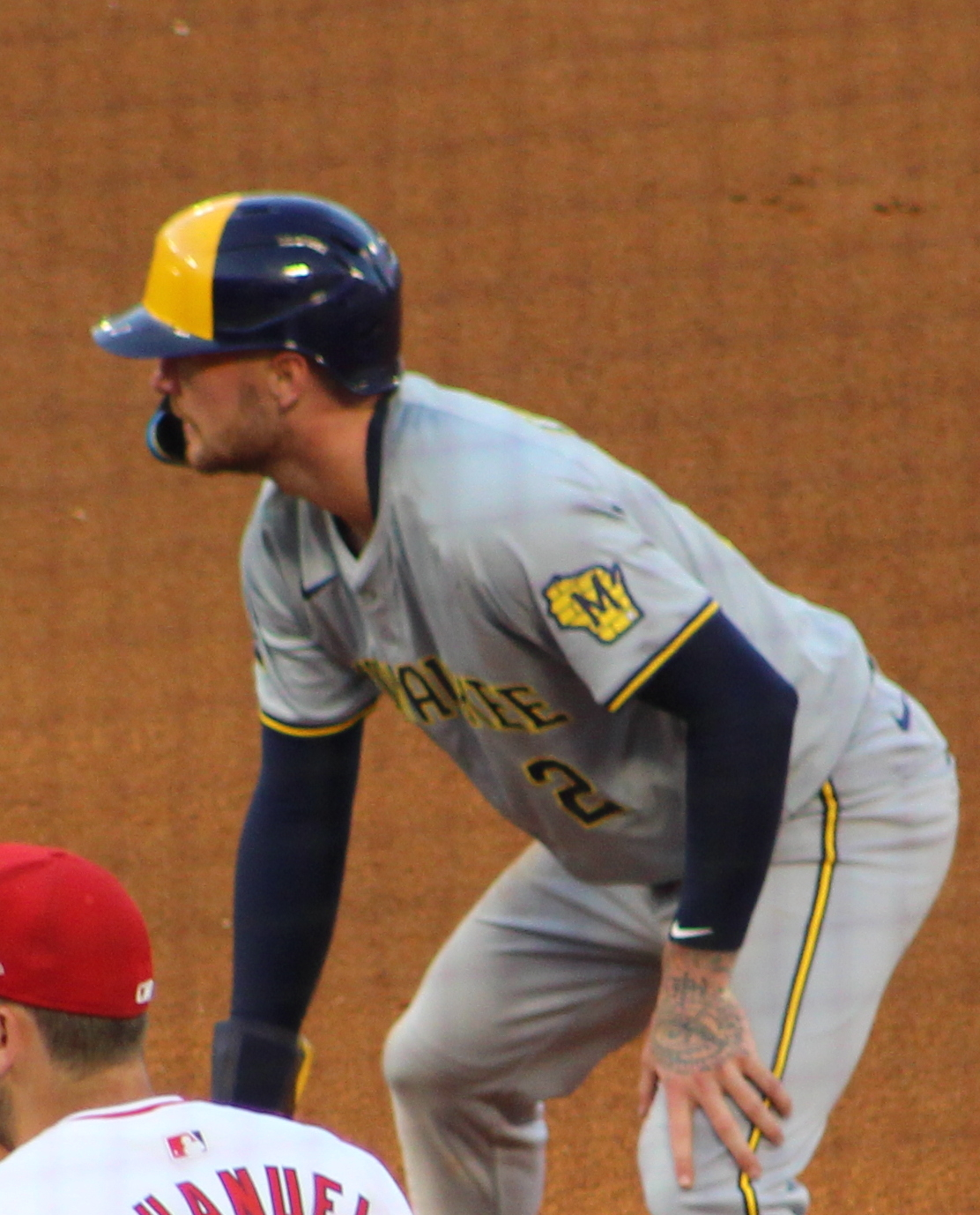
Brice Turang's home run in the fourth inning tied the game and helped the Brewers win game one 2–1.

October 11, 2026 7:16 pm (CDT) at American Family Field in Milwaukee, Wisconsin 71 °F (22 °C), Clear
Team	1	2	3	4	5	6	7	8	9	R	H	E
Los Angeles	0	1	0	0	0	0	0	0	0	1	7	0
Milwaukee	0	0	0	1	1	0	0	0	X	2	6	0
WP: DL Hall (1–0) LP: Tarik Skubal (0–1) Sv: Trevor Megill (1); Home runs: LAD: None; MIL: Brice Turang (1); Attendance: 42,617; Boxscore

The Dodgers opened the scoring in the top of the second inning when Shohei Ohtani scored on an RBI single by Andy Pages. Los Angeles threatened to expand its lead against Brewers ace Jacob Misiorowski, loading the bases with one out, but Enrique Hernández grounded into an inning-ending double play. Milwaukee answered in the bottom of the fourth on a solo home run by Brice Turang, tying the game at 1–1.

Misiorowski pitched 4 1/3 innings for Milwaukee, allowing one run on five hits while striking out five. The Brewers took a 2–1 lead in the bottom of the fifth when Garrett Mitchell drew a lead-off walk and later scored on an RBI single from Luis Lara. Tarik Skubal pitched five innings for Los Angeles, taking the loss after allowing two runs on five hits with seven strikeouts.

Although the Dodgers out-hit the Brewers, all seven of their hits were singles, and three separate drives ended in inning-ending double plays. Trevor Megill navigated two baserunners in a scoreless ninth inning to earn the save and secure the victory. The win marked Milwaukee's first postseason victory over Los Angeles since Game 6 of the 2018 NLCS, snapping a seven-game playoff losing streak against the Dodgers.

=== Game 2 ===
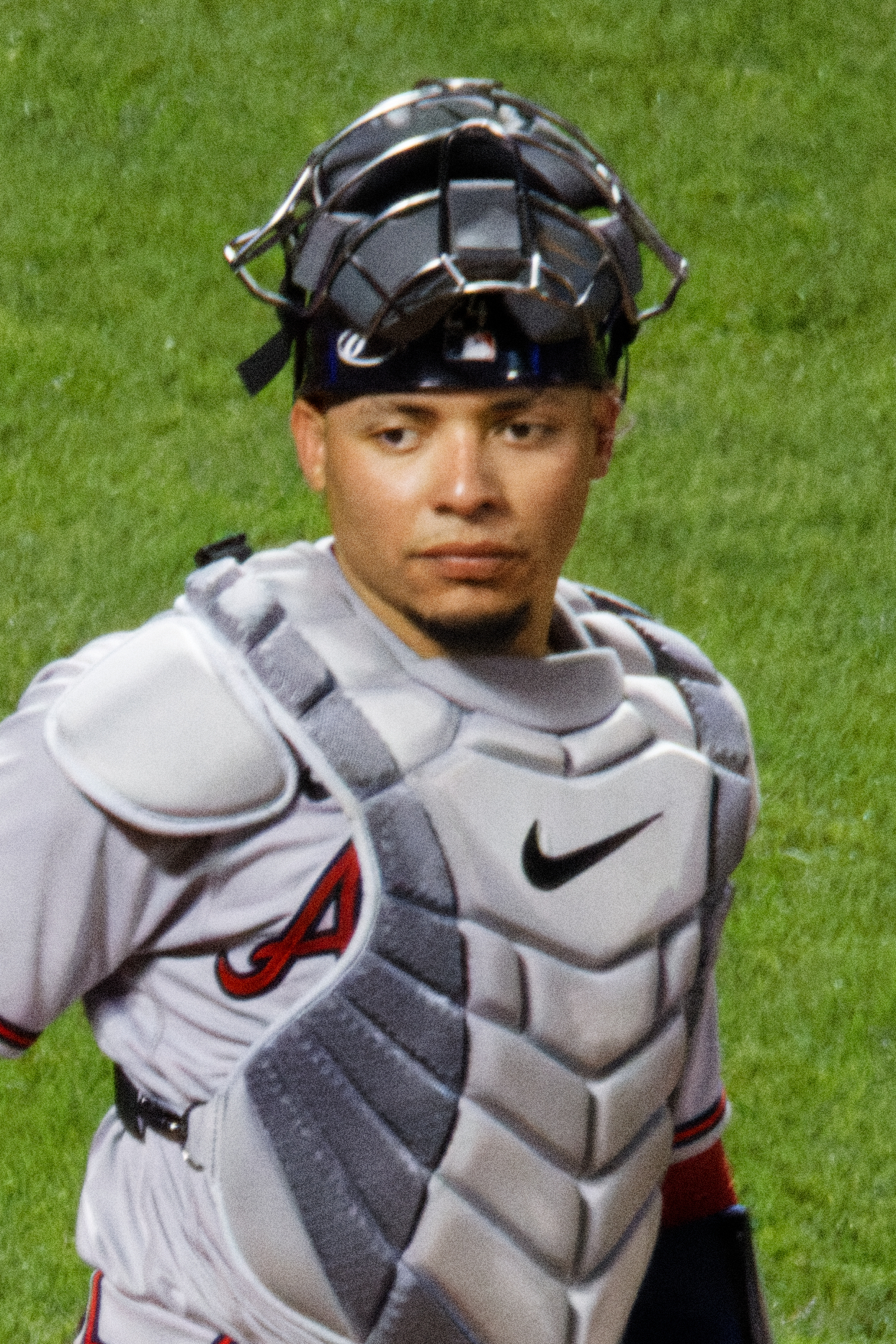
William Contreras went 3 for 4, including a solo home run and three RBI to give the Brewers a 2–0 series lead.

October 12, 2026 4:04 pm (CDT) at American Family Field in Milwaukee, Wisconsin 85 °F (29 °C), Sunny
Team	1	2	3	4	5	6	7	8	9	R	H	E
Los Angeles	1	0	1	0	2	0	0	0	0	4	3	2
Milwaukee	1	0	2	0	1	1	0	2	X	7	12	2
WP: JoJo Romero (1–0) LP: Brock Stewart (0–1) Sv: Aaron Ashby (1); Home runs: LAD: None; MIL: William Contreras (1); Attendance: 42,516; Boxscore

The Dodgers struck first in the top of the opening frame when Mookie Betts crossed the plate on an RBI sacrifice fly by Teoscar Hernández. The Brewers answered immediately in the home half, tying the game at 1–1 when Brice Turang came home on an RBI single by William Contreras. Los Angeles reclaimed the lead in the top of the third at 2–1, capitalizing on back-to-back singles by Tommy Edman and Betts before Logan Henderson committed a throwing error on a pickoff attempt at first base. Milwaukee took a 3–2 lead in the bottom of the third inning when Christian Yelich hit an RBI single to score both David Hamilton and Turang.

Yoshinobu Yamamoto labored through just 2 2/3 innings for the Dodgers, yielding three runs on four hits and a pair of walks with only one strikeout—marking the shortest postseason start of his professional career. The Dodgers tied the score at 3–3 in the fourth after Kyle Tucker doubled and scored when Henderson committed his second throwing error of the game on Edman's sacrifice bunt. Los Angeles moved back on top 4–3 later in the inning when Edman tagged up and scored on an RBI sacrifice fly by Freddie Freeman. The Brewers challenged the bang-bang play at the plate, but the call on the field was upheld after a video review.

Henderson pitched four innings, allowing four runs (two earned) on three hits while punching out two. Milwaukee tied it up once more in the fifth when William Contreras launched a solo shot off Kris Bubic, making it 4–4. The Brewers then pushed ahead 5–4 on another RBI single by Contreras, driving in Hamilton, and expanded their lead to 7–4 in the eighth courtesy of RBI knocks from Turang and Jake Bauers.

Once Henderson exited, Milwaukee's relief pitchers combined for five perfect innings–the most by a bullpen in a game in postseason history, while striking out seven.

=== Game 3 ===
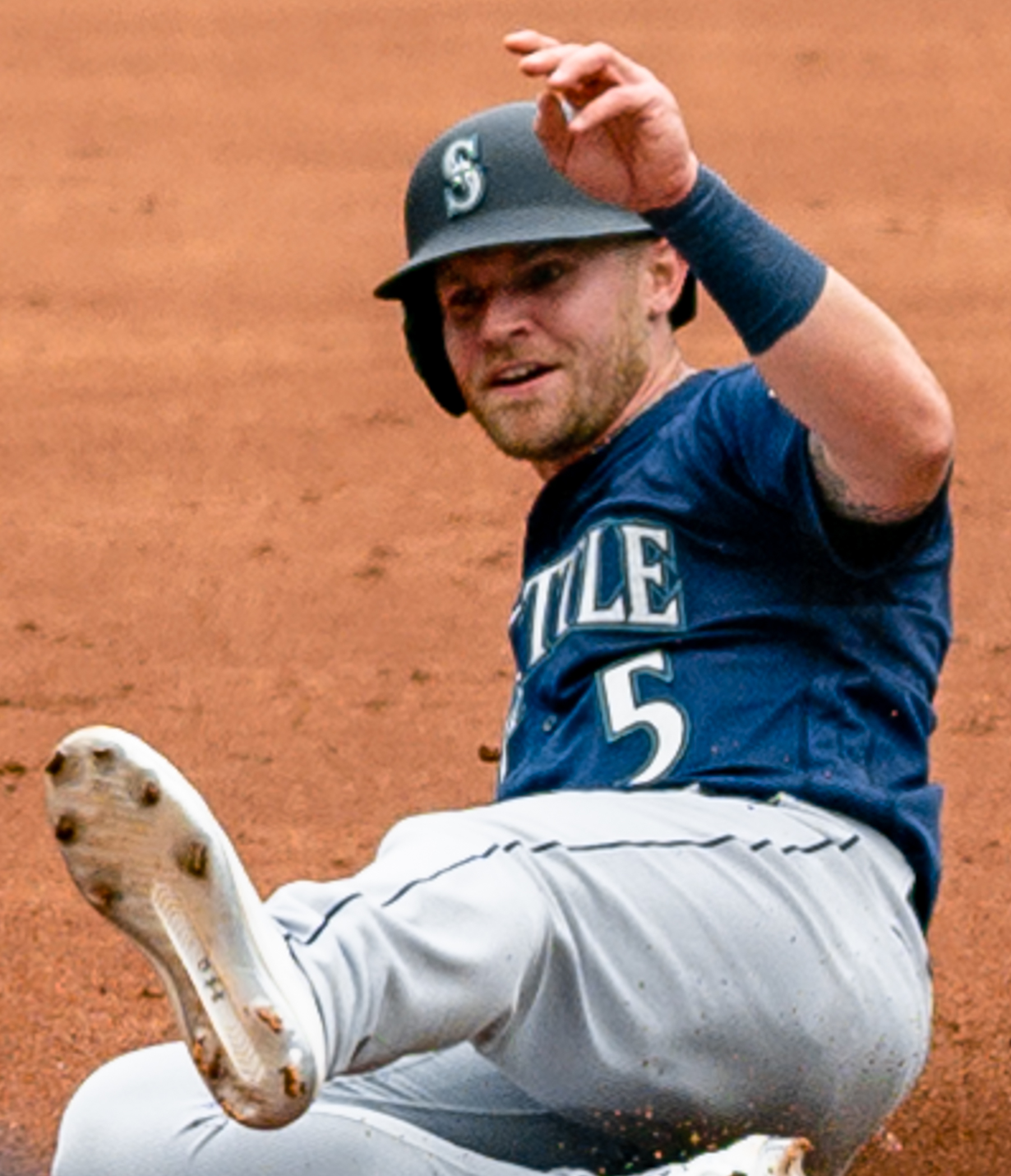
Jake Bauers hit the go-ahead 2-run home run in the top of the 7th inning to give the Brewers the lead and get the Brewers to a 3–0 series lead.

October 14, 2026 5:09 pm (PDT) at Dodger Stadium in Los Angeles, California 79 °F (26 °C), Clear
Team	1	2	3	4	5	6	7	8	9	R	H	E
Milwaukee	1	0	0	0	0	0	3	1	1	6	9	0
Los Angeles	0	0	0	0	0	2	0	0	0	2	5	0
WP: DL Hall (2–0) LP: Blake Snell (0–1) Sv: Trevor Megill (2); Home runs: MIL: Jackson Chourio (1), Jake Bauers (1), Garrett Mitchell (1); LAD: None; Attendance: 50,708; Boxscore

In the top of the first inning, Jackson Chourio struck immediately, launching a leadoff home run off Blake Snell on the very first pitch to put the Brewers ahead 1–0. Robert Gasser pitched five innings, allowing just three hits while striking out three. Los Angeles finally broke through in the bottom of the sixth when Will Smith delivered a clutch two-run double to seize a 2–1 lead.

In the top of the seventh, Jake Bauers grinded through an 11-pitch at-bat before hitting a go-ahead, two-run homer. Garrett Mitchell followed with a solo shot to extend the margin to 4–2, spelling the end of the night for Snell, who finished with six innings pitched, four hits, four runs, and nine strikeouts. Bauers and Mitchell became only the third pair of left-handed hitters to hit back-to-back home runs off a left-handed pitcher in MLB postseason history. After Roki Sasaki surrendered two hits in the eighth inning, Justin Wrobleski took over out of the bullpen and threw a wild pitch, allowing Brice Turang to score and push the lead to 5–2. Joey Ortiz added an insurance run in the top of the ninth with an RBI single, capping the scoring at 6–2 before Trevor Megill locked down the save.

=== Game 4 ===
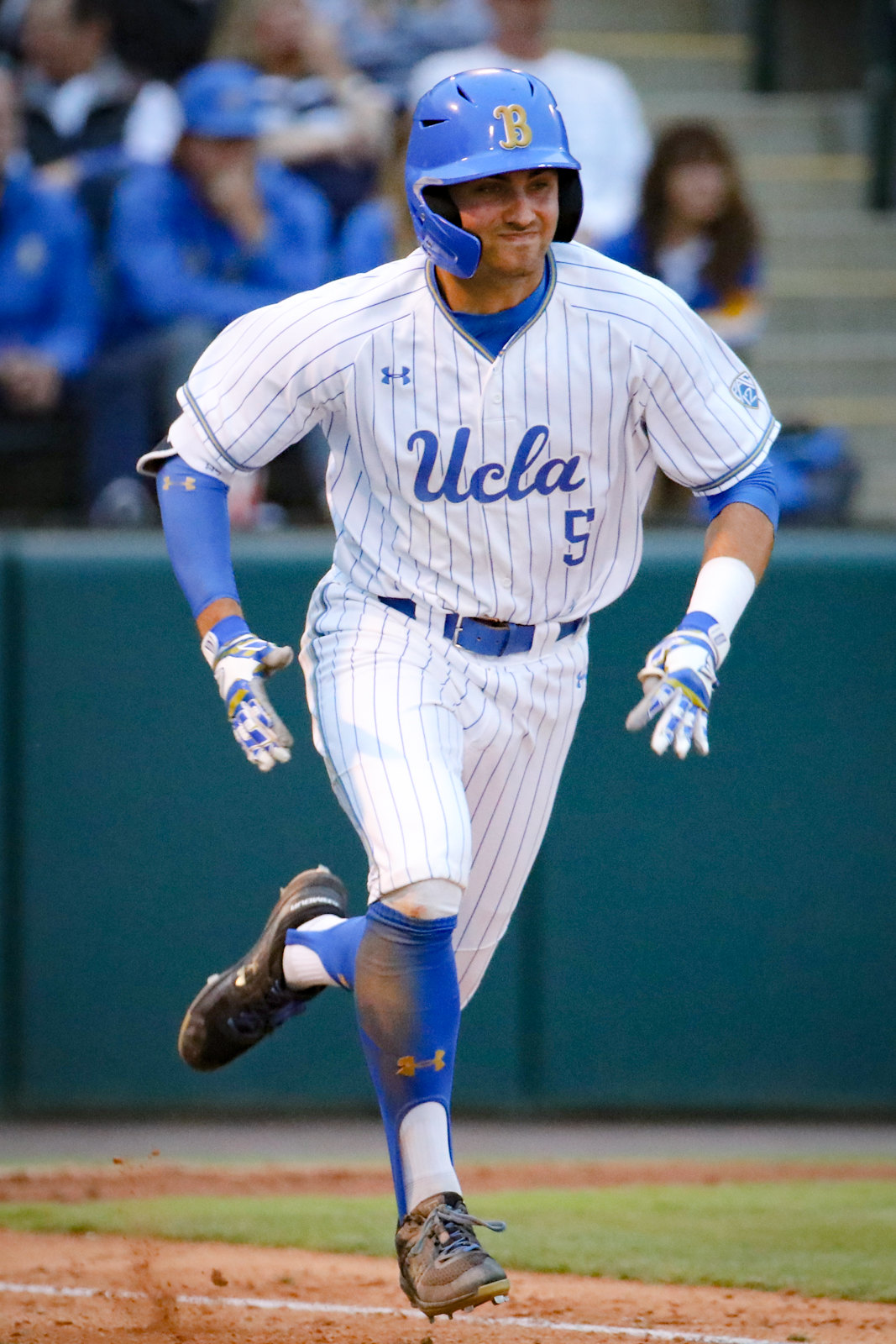
Garrett Mitchell hit the go-ahead solo home run for the Brewers to complete the four game sweep of the Dodgers.

October 15, 2026 5:08 pm (PDT) at Dodger Stadium in Los Angeles, California 86 °F (30 °C), Clear
Team	1	2	3	4	5	6	7	8	9	R	H	E
Milwaukee	0	0	0	2	2	1	0	0	1	6	5	1
Los Angeles	0	4	0	0	0	0	0	0	0	4	8	0
WP: JoJo Romero (2–0) LP: Tanner Scott (0–1) Sv: Aaron Ashby (2); Home runs: MIL: Garrett Mitchell (2), David Hamilton (1); LAD: Shohei Ohtani (1); Attendance: 49,104; Boxscore

As was the case with each of the first three games, the Dodgers took an early lead only for Milwaukee to eventually respond. Kyle Tucker started the bottom of the second inning with a single, and Shane Drohan was replaced by Dustin May. Teoscar Hernández then hit a single to advance Tucker to third base, and Andy Pages scored Tucker on an RBI single to put the Dodgers on the board at 1–0. Shohei Ohtani then hit a three-run home run off May to extend the Dodgers' lead to 4–0. It was Ohtani's first home run in 58 days, the longest drought of his career.

In the top of the fourth inning, Jake Bauers hit an RBI ground-rule double scoring two runs to cut the Brewers' deficit to 4–2. In the top of the fifth inning, David Hamilton hit an RBI single to score Sal Frelick, to bring the Brewers within one, 4–3. They would later tie the game at four after a bases-loaded walk to Bauers, which scored Hamilton.

Tyler Glasnow pitched 4 1/3 innings, giving up three hits and four runs while striking out six batters. In the top of the sixth inning, Garrett Mitchell hit a solo home run to give the Brewers a 5–4 lead. In the top of the ninth inning, David Hamilton hit a solo home run to extend the Brewers' lead to 6–4. Aaron Ashby pitched three innings for the save and the Brewers swept the Dodgers as they reached the World Series for the first time since 1982. Having come from behind in all four games, the Brewers became the first team to have swept an opponent in a best-of-seven postseason series with four straight comeback victories (in their postseason run leading to the World Series, six of their seven postseason wins were in comeback fashion). The four-run comeback tied a record for the largest deficit overcome in an LCS-clinching game (sharing the mark with Game 6 of the 2000 ALCS and Game 7 of the 2003 ALCS) and largest to clinch a sweep. This marked the first time the Dodgers were swept in a four-game series since the 1966 World Series and they became the first defending champion to be swept in a best-of-seven series since the Oakland Athletics were swept in the 1990 World Series. In addition to being the first occasion that the Brewers completed a four-game sweep in their postseason history, they became the first team in MLB history to have been swept in a postseason series and sweep the same opponent the following year (in the major four American sports leagues, the Brewers are the first to have done so in a best-of-seven series).

In the series, Milwaukee, known for their small ball (finishing last in the NL in home runs), out-homered Los Angeles seven to one. Jake Bauers won the NLCS MVP, the first Brewer to win an LCS MVP Award. (Note: In the only time that the Brewers had won a pennant with the 1982 American League Championship Series prior to 2026, a member of the losing team in Fred Lynn of the California Angels won the ALCS MVP award.)

=== Composite line score ===
2026 NLCS (4–0): Milwaukee Brewers beat Los Angeles Dodgers

Team	1	2	3	4	5	6	7	8	9	R	H	E
Los Angeles Dodgers	1	5	1	0	2	2	0	0	0	11	23	2
Milwaukee Brewers	2	0	2	3	3	2	3	3	2	21	32	2
Total attendance: 184,945 Average attendance: 46,236

== See also ==
- 2026 American League Championship Series
- Milwaukee Brewers reverse World Series curse
