= Bruce Dreckman =

American baseball umpire (born 1970)

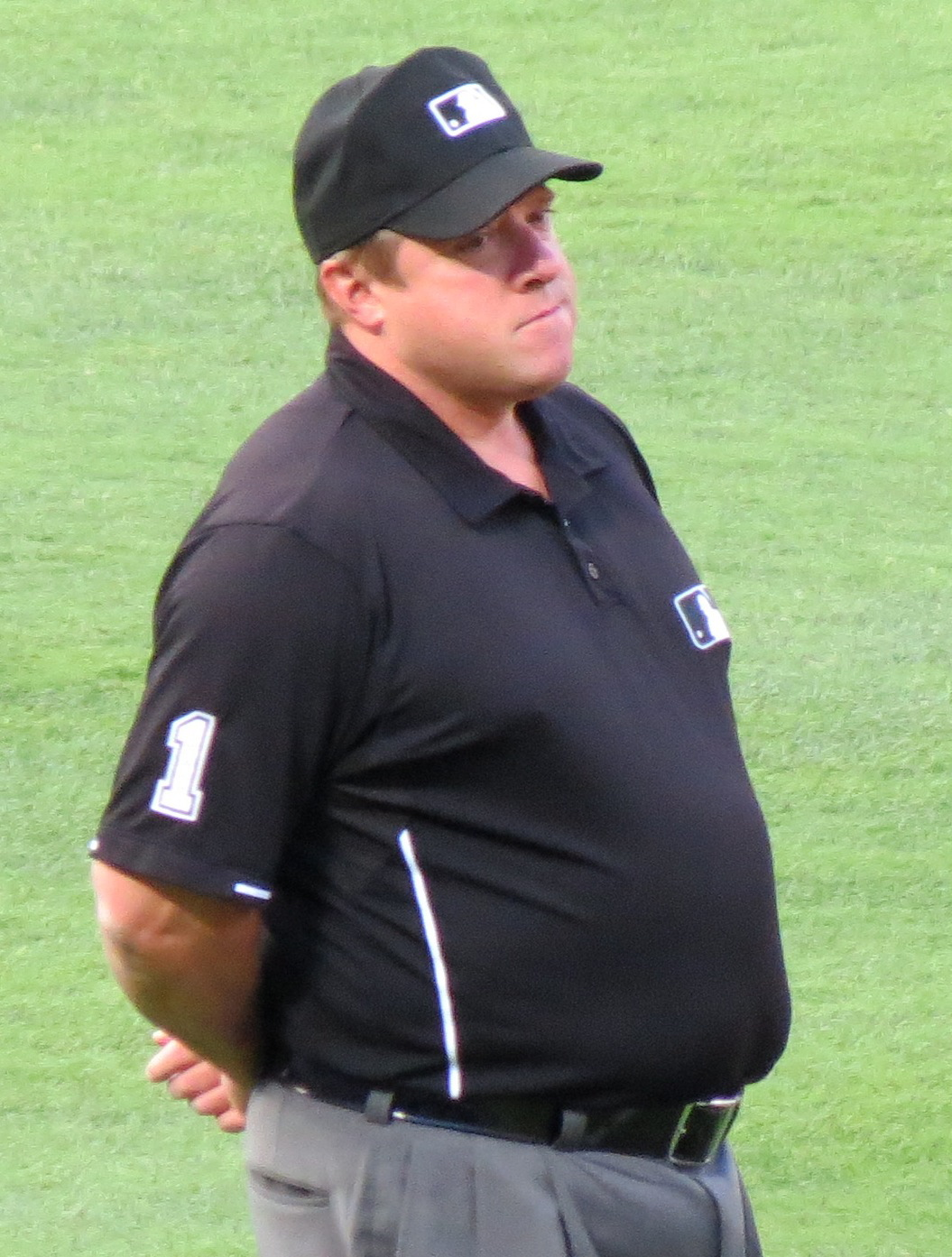
- Dreckman in 2013

MLB – No. 1
- Umpire
- Born: August 7, 1970 (age 55); Le Mars, Iowa, U.S.

MLB debut
- April 5, 1996

Crew information
- Umpiring crew: K
- Crew members: #14 Mark Wegner (crew chief); #1 Bruce Dreckman; #37 Carlos Torres; #34 Nate Tomlinson

Career highlights and awards
- Special assignments: League Championship Series (2009, 2013); Division Series (2004, 2005, 2010, 2011, 2019); Wild Card Games/Series (2022); All-Star Games (2010, 2024); World Baseball Classic (2009); Japan All-Star Series (2006); MLB Little League Classic (2025)

Bruce Michael Dreckman (born August 7, 1970) is an American umpire in Major League Baseball. He wears number 1.

Dreckman began his career in 1996 as a National League umpire, but has umpired in both Major Leagues since 2002. Prior to reaching MLB, Dreckman umpired in the Appalachian League, Midwest League, Carolina League, Southern League, and American Association. Dreckman has worked the 2004, 2005, 2010, and 2011 National League Division Series, the 2009 and 2013 National League Championship Series, and the 2010 All-Star Game.

Dreckman was among the 54 umpires who were part of the 1999 Major League Umpires Association mass resignation, a labor negotiating tactic that backfired when the major leagues accepted 22 of the resignations (and allowed others to be rescinded). Dreckman was among those who lost his job, and did not return to the major league diamond as an arbiter until being rehired in 2002.

With the retirement of close friend Larry Vanover after the 2024 season, Dreckman is the last active umpire among the 22 whose resignations were accepted.

He was the first base umpire for Roy Halladay's no-hitter in Game 1 of the 2010 NLDS and the home plate umpire for Francisco Liriano's no-hitter in 2011. Dreckman represented MLB in the 2006 Japan All-Star Series, and worked the Miami round of the 2009 World Baseball Classic. He also was the first base umpire who, on May 13, 2010, called San Francisco Giants catcher Eli Whiteside safe on a bang-bang play at first base after Whiteside hit a line drive off the side of San Diego Padres pitcher Mat Latos. The hit would wind up being the only hit or walk Latos allowed in the game, as an error was committed by second baseman Lance Zawadzki but the error would not have happened because it occurred while trying to complete a double play, something that would have been impossible if Whiteside had been called out. The Padres, at that point, were the only team in MLB history to have never thrown a no-hitter, let alone a perfect game. Replays, however, seem to indicate that Dreckman had made the correct call by calling Whiteside safe.

Dreckman was the third base umpire on July 30, 2017, when Adrián Beltré of the Texas Rangers got his 3000th career hit against the Baltimore Orioles.

When keeping track of balls and strikes, Dreckman does not use the traditional handheld indicator used by most umpires. He instead utilizes two elastic down indicators (one for each hand) that football referees wear on their wrists. When the count is 0-0, he has the elastics around his thumbs. When there is one ball and/or one strike, he wears them around his index finger, and so on. He is the only current MLB umpire to use this strategy.

Dreckman lives in Marcus, Iowa with his wife and three children.

== See also ==
- List of Major League Baseball umpires (disambiguation)
