= Vic Carapazza =

American baseball umpire (born 1979)

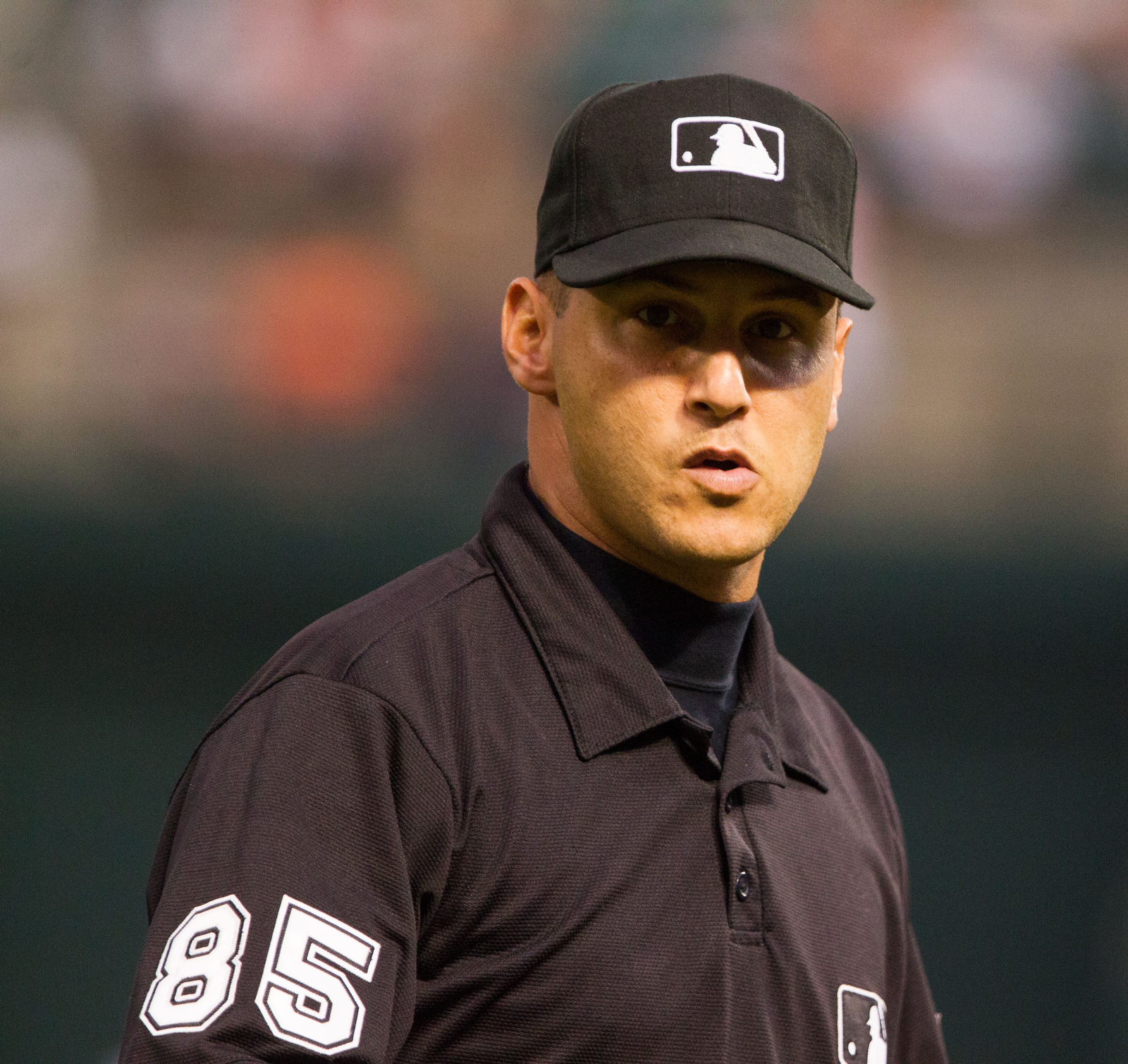
- Carapazza in 2012

MLB – No. 19
- Umpire
- Born: July 6, 1979 (age 47); Port Jefferson, New York, U.S.

MLB debut
- April 9, 2010

Crew information
- Umpiring crew: P
- Crew members: #19 Vic Carapazza (crew chief); #21 Hunter Wendelstedt; #59 Nic Lentz; #32 Edwin Moscoso

Career highlights and awards
- Special assignments: World Series (2023, 2026); League Championship Series (2018, 2022, 2024, 2025); Division Series (2014, 2015, 2016, 2017, 2021, 2023, 2026); Wild Card Games/Series (2020, 2022, 2024, 2025); All-Star Games (2014)

Victor Joseph Carapazza (born July 6, 1979) is an American Major League Baseball umpire. He wears uniform number 19, and previously wore uniform number 85.

== Umpiring career ==
From 2003 until 2012 Carapazza was an umpire with several minor leagues, including the International League. He began umpiring Major League Spring Training in 2009.

Carapazza made his Major League Baseball umpiring debut on April 9, 2010, in St. Petersburg, Florida as the Tampa Bay Rays defeated the New York Yankees 9–3, working third base in that game. He umpired in 29 games in 2010, and returned in 2011, umpiring in 133 games.

Carapazza was hired to the full-time Major League Baseball staff in early January 2013.

He served as the right-field umpire during the 2014 Major League Baseball All-Star Game, marking his first such assignment. Carapazza also umpired in the 2014 National League Division Series, and in Game 2 he ejected Washington Nationals second baseman Asdrúbal Cabrera and manager Matt Williams in the 10th inning for arguing balls and strikes.

Carapazza faced controversy after a game on July 1, 2016, between the Toronto Blue Jays and Cleveland Indians. Blue Jay fans booed Carapazza in response to calls made during the 2015 American League Division Series. Carapazza went on to eject Blue Jay players Russell Martin, Edwin Encarnacion, manager John Gibbons, and called 9 Jays out-on-strikes, compared to only 1 of the visiting Indians.

Carapazza has called three consecutive American League Division Series (2015, 2016, 2017), as well as the 2021 American League Division Series and the 2023 National League Division Series. He has also worked four Wild Card Games/Series (2020, 2022, 2024, 2025), three League Championship Series (2018, 2022, 2024), and was assigned to the 2023 World Series and 2026 World Series.

For the 2018 regular season, he was found to be one of the top ten home plate umpires in terms of accuracy in calling balls and strikes. His error rate was 8.05 percent. This was based on a study conducted at Boston University where 372,442 pitches were analyzed.

Carapazza was the home plate umpire for Joe Musgrove's no-hitter on April 9, 2021.

Carapazza was promoted to crew chief in 2025.

== Personal life ==
Carapazza was born in Port Jefferson, New York. In 1998 he graduated from Countryside High School in Clearwater, Florida. Prior to becoming an umpire Carapazza served in the United States Air Force. He has four daughters with his wife Stephanie and is the son-in-law of former American League umpire Rich Garcia.

== See also ==
- List of Major League Baseball umpires (disambiguation)
