= Mark Wegner =

American baseball umpire (born 1972)

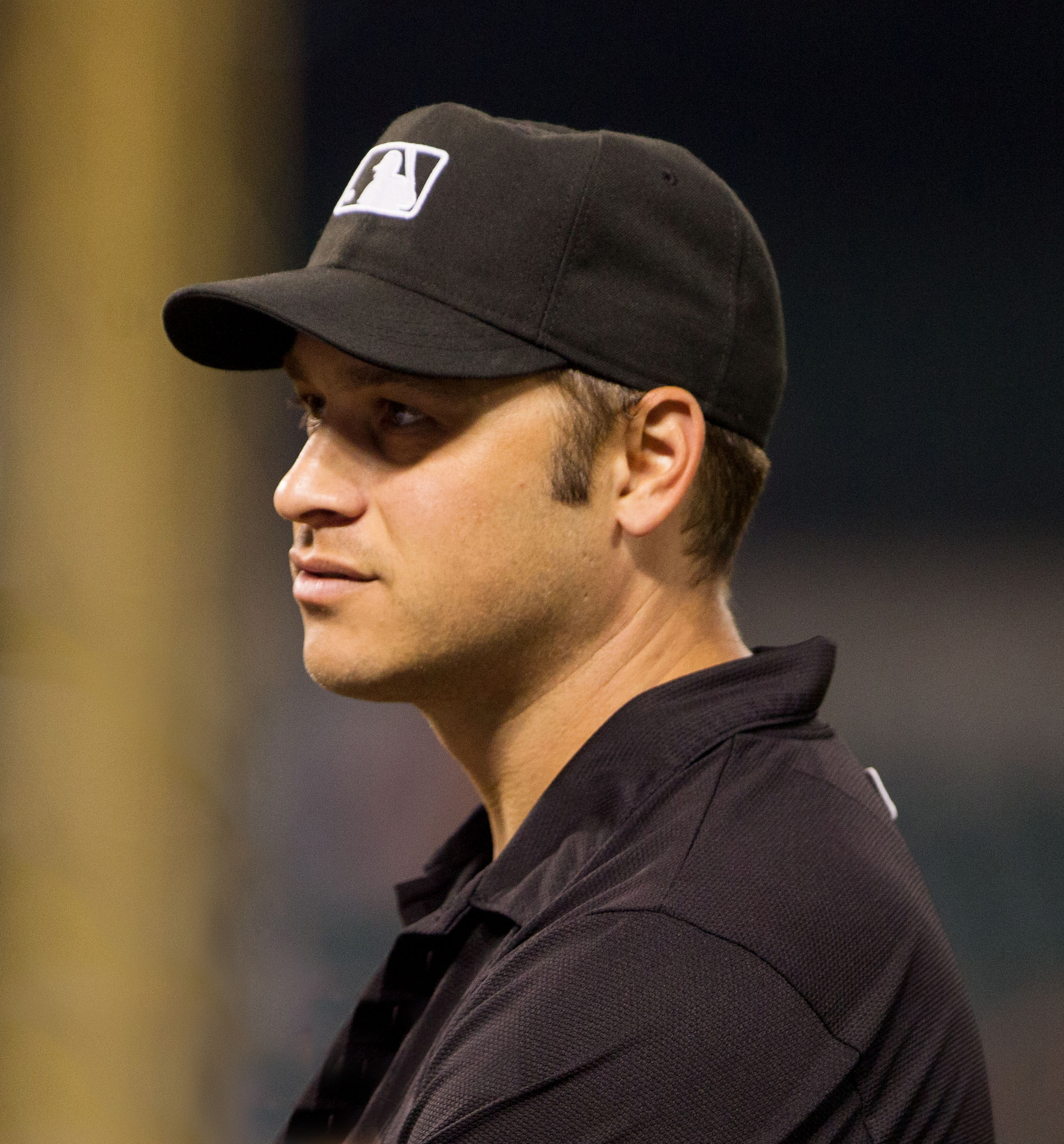
- Wegner in 2012

MLB – No. 14
- Umpire
- Born: March 4, 1972 (age 54); Saint Paul, Minnesota, U.S.

MLB debut
- May 20, 1998

Crew information
- Umpiring crew: K
- Crew members: #14 Mark Wegner (crew chief); #1 Bruce Dreckman; #37 Carlos Torres; #34 Nate Tomlinson

Career highlights and awards
- Special assignments: World Series (2013, 2017, 2025); League Championship Series (2007, 2014, 2015, 2016, 2018, 2026); Division Series (2003, 2004, 2005, 2008, 2009, 2012, 2013, 2017, 2019, 2020, 2025); Wild Card Games/Series (2014, 2018, 2020, 2023, 2024, 2026); All-Star Games (2008, 2019); World Baseball Classic (2009, 2013, 2017); MLB Little League Classic (2019, 2025)

Mark Patrick Wegner (born March 4, 1972) is an American Major League Baseball umpire. He worked in the National League from 1998 to 1999, and throughout both major leagues since 2000. He was promoted to Crew Chief for the 2018 MLB season when Dale Scott retired after the 2017 MLB season.

== Umpiring career ==
Wegner has umpired in 11 Division Series (2003, 2004, 2005, 2008, 2009, 2012, 2013, 2017, 2019, 2020, 2025), six League Championship Series (2007, 2014, 2015, 2016, 2018, 2026), and two World Baseball Classics (2009, 2013). He also officiated in the 2008 All-Star Game and 2019 All-Star Game, the 2014 and 2018 National League Wild Card Games, and the 2013 World Series, the 2017 World Series, and recently the 2025 World Series for which he served as crew chief. Wegner wears uniform number 14, and previously wore uniform number 47. For the 2018 regular season he was found to be a Top 10 performing home plate umpire in terms of accuracy in calling balls and strikes. His error rate was 7.28 percent. This was based on a study conducted at Boston University where 372,442 pitches were culled and analyzed.

=== Controversy ===
On June 2, 2007, Wegner was involved in a heated argument with Chicago Cubs manager Lou Piniella. After Wegner ruled that Ángel Pagán was out at third on an attempted steal, Piniella, who later acknowledged the call was correct, stormed out of the dugout, threw his hat down, and started kicking dirt on Wegner. Piniella was ejected and given a four-game suspension and he later apologized to Wegner.

=== Notable games ===
On June 28, 2007, Wegner was behind the plate when Toronto Blue Jay Frank Thomas hit his 500th career home run off Minnesota Twins pitcher Carlos Silva. Later in the game, Thomas was ejected by Wegner for arguing balls and strikes. Toronto manager John Gibbons was thrown out of the game as well.

Wegner umpired at third base on the game where Randy Johnson won his 300th career game on June 4, 2009.

On May 30, 2012, Wegner was the target of Chicago White Sox announcer Ken Harrelson for ejecting pitcher Jose Quintana. Harrelson claimed Wegner "knew nothing about the game of baseball". Those comments drew much ire from Major League Baseball, and Harrelson apologized for those comments.

Wegner worked his first career no-hitter on July 13, 2013, calling balls and strikes for Tim Lincecum's 148-pitch performance against the San Diego Padres. Replays indicate Wegner called Lincecum to the tune of 97.9% accuracy, missing just two pitches.

On November 1, 2017, Wegner was behind home plate for Game 7 of the World Series, which was won by the Houston Astros by a score of 5‍–‍1 over the host Los Angeles Dodgers. Prior to the start of the 2018 season, Wegner was promoted to crew chief.

== Personal life ==
A Catholic known for his charity work, Wegner has been involved in church activities and the "BLUE for kids" outreach of UMPS CARE, the MLB Umpires' charity.

== See also ==
- List of Major League Baseball umpires (disambiguation)
