= Hunter Wendelstedt =

American baseball umpire (born 1971)

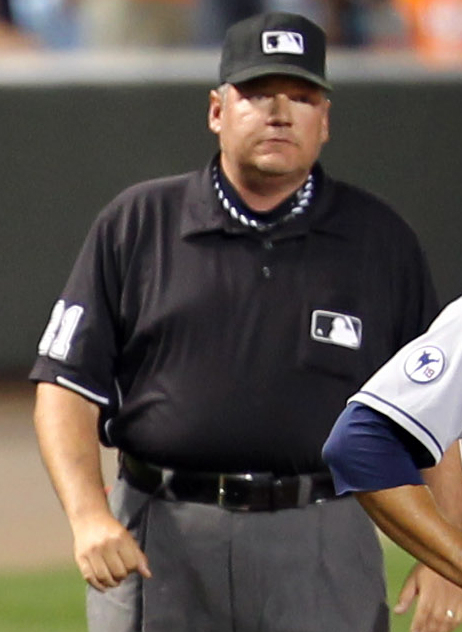
- Wendelstedt in 2011

MLB – No. 21
- Umpire
- Born: June 22, 1971 (age 55); Atlanta, Georgia, U.S.

MLB debut
- April 19, 1998

Crew information
- Umpiring crew: P
- Crew members: #19 Vic Carapazza (crew chief); #21 Hunter Wendelstedt; #59 Nic Lentz; #32 Edwin Moscoso

Career highlights and awards
- Special Assignments: All-Star Game (2011); Wild Card Games/Series (2015, 2022); Division Series (2003, 2010, 2013, 2014); League Championship Series (2006, 2015, 2017, 2018); World Series (2014); World Baseball Classic (2009)

Harry Hunter Wendelstedt III (born June 22, 1971) is an American baseball umpire who has worked in the National League in 1998–1999 and throughout both major leagues since 2000. His father Harry Hunter Wendelstedt Jr. was a National League umpire from 1966 to 1998. Hunter Wendelstedt goes by his middle name to avoid confusion with his father.

== Umpiring career ==
Wendelstedt has worked one All-Star Game (2011), two Wild Card Game/Series (2015, 2022), four Division Series (2003, 2010, 2013, 2014), four League Championship Series (2006, 2015, 2017, 2018), and one World Series (2014). He also officiated in the 2009 World Baseball Classic.

As his career began just as his father was retiring, Hunter Wendelstedt wears the same number as his father did, 21. The Wendelstedts are the only father-son pair to have umpired a Major League game together, an event that occurred over several series in 1998.

=== Interactions with Ron Gardenhire ===
On October 7, 2010, Wendelstedt ejected Minnesota Twins manager Ron Gardenhire from Game 2 of the American League Division Series after Gardenhire argued a pitch which appeared to be strike three to Lance Berkman. Wendelstedt ruled it a ball, and on the next pitch Berkman hit an RBI double to put the Yankees up, 3–2 (they would ultimately win, 5–2). It was at least the fourth time Wendelstedt has ejected Gardenhire. In 2005, Gardenhire was suspended one game and fined after delivering a profanity-laced rant about Wendelstedt, and in 2009, Wendelstedt suggested that Gardenhire should attend his umpiring school to "learn what a balk is," after ejecting Gardenhire for arguing a non-balk call. This contentious history fueled questions about the appropriateness of Major League Baseball putting Wendelstedt on a postseason series involving Gardenhire, as there is precedent in baseball for avoiding such confrontations, most notably the American League removing umpire Ron Luciano from games involving the Baltimore Orioles due to a long history of bad blood between the umpire and Orioles manager Earl Weaver.

On August 22, 2011, Wendelstedt ejected Twins third baseman Danny Valencia for disputing balls and strikes. Gardenhire came out to argue the ejection, after which his ejection followed. Afterwards, Gardenhire stated he and Wendelstedt actually get along well. Gardenhire remarked about what had happened being his fault, not Wendelstedt's.

=== Incident with Aaron Boone ===
On April 22, 2024, Wendelstedt ejected New York Yankees manager Aaron Boone for allegedly continuing to argue a missed call after receiving a warning. Footage from the television broadcast led to speculation that Boone had not continued arguing but that a fan seated behind the Yankees dugout had shouted at Wendelstedt and been confused for Boone. Despite this, Wendelstedt said, "I don't care who said it, you're gone." Following the game, Wendelstedt doubled down on the ejection, acknowledging that Boone likely said nothing and was quoted as saying, "It's foolish to throw out a player if you don't know who did it. The manager's there. Aaron took the hit and he probably, you know, is not the one who made the comment but once again, he's the manager of the Yankees and he's responsible for the team." Wendelstedt was also quoted as saying, "This isn't my first ejection. In the entirety of my career, I have never ejected a player or manager for something a fan has said," despite overwhelming evidence that this is what occurred in this instance.

=== On-field injuries ===
While umpiring first base during the April 16, 2025, game between the New York Mets and Minnesota Twins, Wendelstedt was struck in the head by a foul line drive hit by Mets outfielder Tyrone Taylor. He left the game and was taken to a hospital in Minneapolis. Wendelstedt would end up missing the rest of the season. Wendelstedt had previously exited a 2016 game between the Yankees and the Toronto Blue Jays in which he was umpiring home plate after being struck in the face mask by a foul ball.

== Personal life ==
Hunter attended Loyola University New Orleans for two years, where he was a member of Alpha Delta Gamma fraternity.

After the death of his father, Hunter took over operations of the Wendelstedt Umpire School in Florida and is involved with the YMCA Ormond Beach and YMCA Edgewater Charity Golf Tournaments.

== See also ==
- List of Major League Baseball umpires (disambiguation)
