= Carlos Torres (umpire) =

Venezuelan baseball umpire (born 1978)

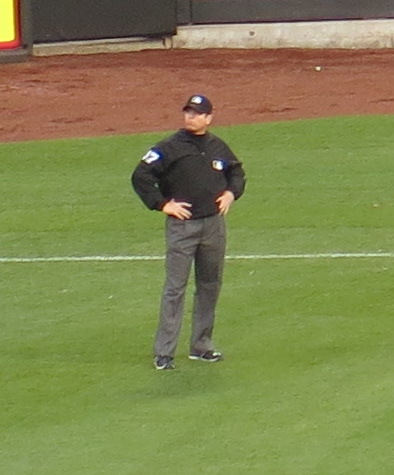
- Torres umpiring at Citi Field in 2016

MLB – No. 37
- Umpire
- Born: September 14, 1978 (age 48); Barquisimeto, Lara, Venezuela

MLB debut
- July 17, 2015

Crew information
- Umpiring crew: K
- Crew members: #14 Mark Wegner (crew chief); #1 Bruce Dreckman; #37 Carlos Torres; #34 Nate Tomlinson

Career highlights and awards
- Special assignments: World Series (2024); League Championship Series (2023, 2026); Division Series (2021, 2022, 2024); Wild Card Game/Series (2019, 2020, 2023, 2025); All-Star Games (2022); World Baseball Classic (2023)

Carlos Torres (born September 14, 1978) is a Venezuelan professional umpire in Major League Baseball (MLB). He made his major league debut in 2015.

== Career ==
Torres began umpiring in Minor League Baseball in 2009, working his way up to the Triple-A International League where he umpired during 2013–2015. As a fill-in MLB umpire, he made his major league debut on July 17, 2015, umpiring at second base as the Cincinnati Reds hosted the Cleveland Indians.

During the 2016 season, he umpired 141 games, including 35 as home plate umpire, while issuing three ejections. Torres was added to the full-time MLB umpiring staff for the 2017 season. That year, he umpired 111 games, including 29 behind the plate. He issued 10 ejections, with three coming in a May 19 contest between the Los Angeles Dodgers and Miami Marlins, and five during an August 24 game between the Detroit Tigers and New York Yankees in which the benches cleared three times during the game.

Torres also umpired during qualifying rounds of the 2017 World Baseball Classic.

In 2019, Torres received his first postseason assignment working right field in the 2019 National League Wild Card Game between the Milwaukee Brewers and Washington Nationals.

In 2024, Torres was awarded his first World Series Assignment working home plate in Game 1 in the 2024 World Series between the Los Angeles Dodgers and New York Yankees.
