= 2006 MLB Japan All-Star Series =

The 2006 MLB Japan All-Star Series was the tenth edition of the championship, a best-of-five series between the All-Star teams from Major League Baseball (MLB) and Nippon Professional Baseball (NPB). After the 2006 championship, the series became defunct.

MLB won the series by 5–0–0 and Ryan Howard was named MVP.

== Results ==
Championship

Game	Winning team	Score	Losing team	Location
1	MLB All-Stars	03-02	NPB All-Stars	Tokyo Dome
2	MLB All-Stars	08-06	NPB All-Stars	Tokyo Dome
3	MLB All-Stars	11-04	NPB All-Stars	Tokyo Dome
4	MLB All-Stars	07-02	NPB All-Stars	Osaka Dome
5	MLB All-Stars	05-03	NPB All-Stars	Fukuoka Dome

== Rosters ==
=== MLB All-Stars roster ===
MLB All-Stars roster
Active roster		Coaches/Other
Pitchers: 61 (United States) Bronson Arroyo (CIN); 45 (Canada) Érik Bédard (BAL); 39 (United States) Chris Capuano (MIL); 40 (United States) Brian Fuentes (COL); 52 (United States) Clay Hensley (SD); 56 (United States) Ray King (COL); 41 (United States) John Lackey (LAA); 33 (United States) John Maine (NYM); 36 (United States) Mike Myers (NYY); 36 (United States) Joe Nathan (MIN); 62 (United States) Scot Shields (LAA); 32 (United States) Chris Young (SD)	Catchers: 02 (Japan) Kenji Johjima (SEA); 07 (United States) Joe Mauer (MIN); 23 (United States) Brian Schneider (WSH); Infielders: 15 (Dominican Republic) Rafael Furcal (LAD); 06 (United States) Ryan Howard (PHI); 15 (Japan) Tadahito Iguchi (CWS); 35 (United States) Lyle Overbay (TOR); 07 (Dominican Republic) José Reyes (NYM); 26 (United States) Chase Utley (PHI); 05 (United States) David Wright (NYM); Outfielders: 23 (United States) Jermaine Dye (CWS); 09 (United States) Chone Figgins (LAA); 02 (United States) Bill Hall (MIL); 25 (Curaçao) Andruw Jones (ATL); 11 (United States) Jacque Jones (CHC)	Manager: 15 (United States) Bruce Bochy (SD); Coaches: 14 (Dominican Republic) Manny Acta (NYM); 23 (Dominican Republic) Julio Franco (NYM); 31 (Dominican Republic) Ramón Henderson (PHI); 41 (United States) Curt Young (OAK)

=== NPB All-Stars roster ===
Pitchers

- 14 (Japan) Takahiro Mahara (Fukuoka SoftBank Hawks)
- 15 (Japan) Kazuo Fukumori (Tohoku Rakuten Golden Eagles)
- 41 (Japan) Hiroyuki Kobayashi (Chiba Lotte Marines)
- 20 (Japan) Katsuhiro Nagakawa (Hiroshima Toyo Carp)
- 26 (Japan) Tetsuya Utsumi (Yomiuri Giants)
- 21 (Japan) Tsuyoshi Wada (Fukuoka SoftBank Hawks)
- 29 (Japan) Kei Igawa (Hanshin Tigers)
- 11 (Japan) Yu Darvish (Hokkaido Nippon-Ham Fighters)
- 29 (Japan) Tomoya Yagi (Hokkaido Nippon-Ham Fighters)
- 16 (Japan) Hideaki Wakui (Seibu Lions)
- 29 (Japan) Koji Mitsui (Seibu Lions)
- 13 (Japan) Hisashi Ogura (Tohoku Rakuten Golden Eagles)

Catchers

- 10 (Japan) Shinnosuke Abe (Yomiuri Giants)
- 22 (Japan) Tomoya Satozaki (Chiba Lotte Marines)
- 27 (Japan) Takeshi Hidaka (Orix Buffaloes)

Infielders

- 2 (Japan) Michihiro Ogasawara (Hokkaido Nippon-Ham Fighters)
- 9 (Japan) Atsushi Fujimoto (Hanshin Tigers)
- 52 (Japan) Munenori Kawasaki (Fukuoka SoftBank Hawks)
- 25 (Japan) Shuichi Murata (Yokohama BayStars)
- 7 (Japan) Tomohiro Nioka (Yomiuri Giants)
- 9 (Japan) Kazuya Fukuura (Chiba Lotte Marines)
- 4 (Japan) Yosuke Takasu (Tohoku Rakuten Golden Eagles)
- 25 (Japan) Takahiro Arai (Hiroshima Toyo Carp)

Outfielders

- 23 (Japan) Norichika Aoki (Tokyo Yakult Swallows)
- 31 (Japan) Yuki Yoshimura (Yokohama BayStars)
- 46 (Japan) Teppei Tsuchiya (Tohoku Rakuten Golden Eagles)
- 7 (Japan) Naoyuki Ohmura (Fukuoka SoftBank Hawks)

Coaching Staff

- 19 (Japan) Katsuya Nomura (Tohoku Rakuten Golden Eagles)
- 81 (Japan) Nobuhiro Takashiro (Chunichi Dragons)
- 87 (Japan) Takao Obana (Yomiuri Giants)
- 80 (Japan) Shunji Nishi (Tohoku Rakuten Golden Eagles)
