= Domingo Germán =

Dominican baseball player (born 1992)

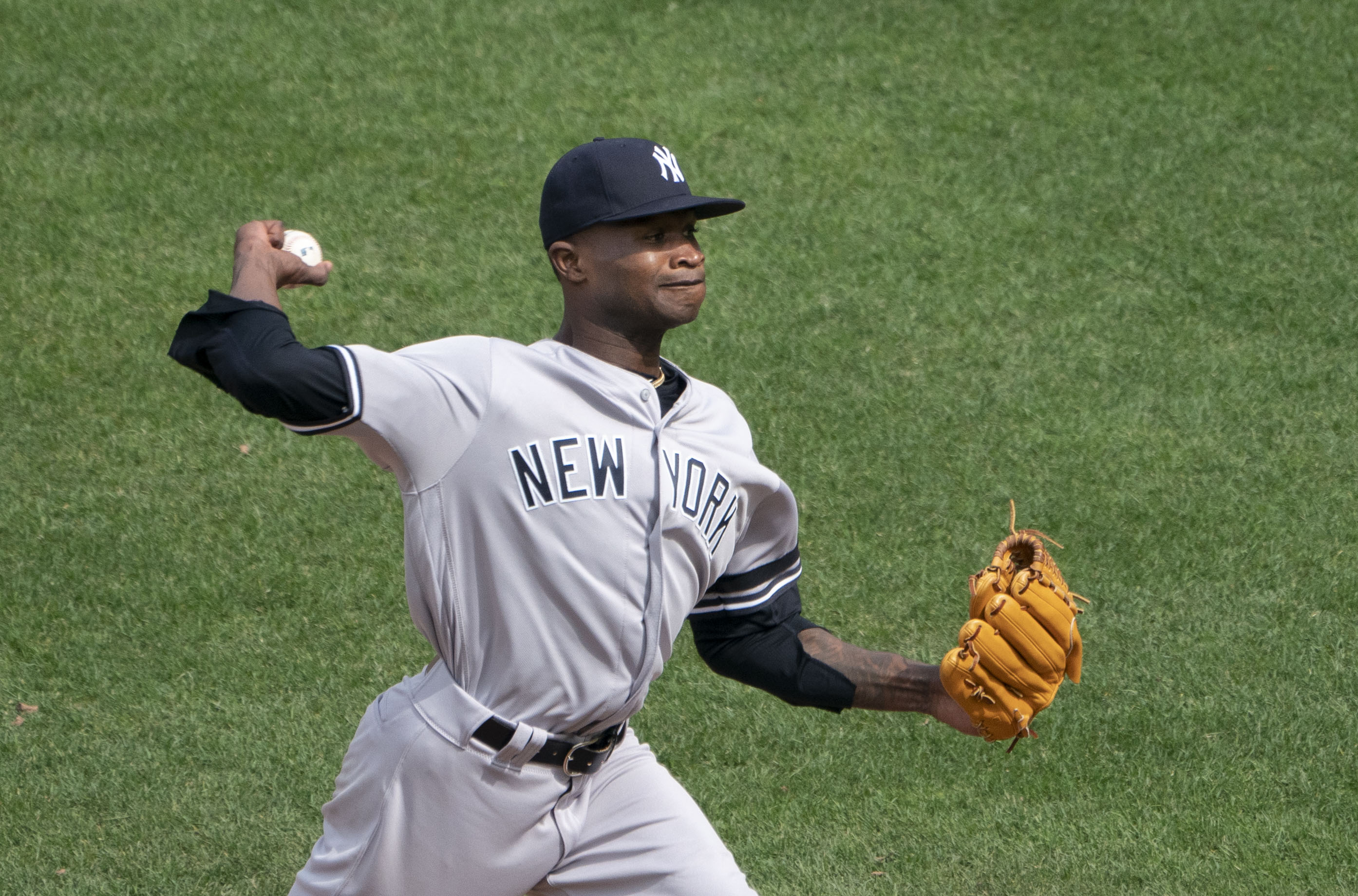
- Germán with the New York Yankees in 2019

Toros de Tijuana – No. 59
- Pitcher
- Born: August 4, 1992 (age 34); San Pedro de Macorís, Dominican Republic
- Bats: Right Throws: Right

MLB debut
- June 11, 2017, for the New York Yankees

MLB statistics (through 2024 season)
- Win–loss record: 31–29
- Earned run average: 4.54
- Strikeouts: 561
- Stats at Baseball Reference

Teams
- New York Yankees (2017–2019, 2021–2023); Pittsburgh Pirates (2024)

Career highlights and awards
- Pitched a perfect game on June 28, 2023

Domingo Germán Polanco (Latin American Spanish pronunciation: [xeɾˈman]; born August 4, 1992) is a Dominican professional baseball pitcher for the Toros de Tijuana of the Mexican League. He has previously played in Major League Baseball (MLB) for the New York Yankees and Pittsburgh Pirates.

Germán was signed by the Florida Marlins as an international free agent in 2009 and made his MLB debut in 2017 with the Yankees. On June 28, 2023, he pitched the 24th perfect game in MLB history, the first by a player from the Dominican Republic. Just over a month later, Germán was placed on the restricted list by the Yankees after a violent clubhouse confrontation while allegedly drunk. He was waived by the Yankees at season's end and signed with the Pirates in 2024.

== Early life ==
Domingo Germán Polanco was born on August 4, 1992, in San Pedro de Macorís, Dominican Republic.

== Professional career ==
=== Florida / Miami Marlins (2009-2013) ===
==== Minor leagues ====
Germán was signed by the then Florida Marlins as an international free agent in 2009. He made his professional debut in 2010 for the Dominican Summer League Marlins.

Germán pitched for the Batavia Muckdogs in 2013, and had a 2–3 win–loss record with a 1.76 earned run average (ERA) in eight games started. He played the 2014 season with the Greensboro Grasshoppers, pitching to a 9–3 win–loss record with a 2.48 ERA and 113 strikeouts. He was selected to play in the 2014 All-Star Futures Game and recorded two strikeouts in the game. After the 2014 season, the Marlins added Germán to their 40-man roster, protecting him from the Rule 5 draft.

=== New York Yankees (2015–2023) ===
On December 19, 2014, the Marlins traded Germán, Nathan Eovaldi, and Garrett Jones to the New York Yankees in exchange for Martín Prado and David Phelps. He missed the 2015 season while recovering from Tommy John surgery and was non-tendered after the season, removing him from the roster and making him a free agent.

On December 11, 2015, the Yankees re-signed Germán to a minor league contract. He made 10 starts split between the Single-A Charleston RiverDogs and High-A Tampa Yankees, accumulated a 3.08 ERA with 38 strikeouts across 49 2/3 innings pitched. On November 4, 2016, the Yankees re-added Germán to their 40-man roster.

==== Major leagues ====
The Yankees promoted Germán to the major leagues for the first time on June 10, 2017. He made his major league debut the next day against the Baltimore Orioles. Germán pitched 2 2/3 scoreless innings of relief, allowing two hits while walking one and striking out one. In seven relief appearances to finish 2017, German finished with an 0–1 record and a 3.14 ERA.

Germán made his first career MLB start on May 6, 2018, at Yankee Stadium against the Cleveland Indians. He pitched six innings without allowing a hit, allowing two walks and striking out nine batters. Germán was removed after the sixth inning due to his pitch count and not being completely stretched out as a starter yet. Germán became the first pitcher in MLB history with nine or more strikeouts and zero hits allowed in his first MLB start. In 19 games (13 starts), Germán had a 2–6 record and a 5.68 ERA. He was optioned to Triple-A on July 21.

In 2019, Germán made the Yankees' Opening Day roster. He was named 'Hurler of the Month' by the team after posting MLB-leading 5 wins, 2.56 ERA (8th in AL), 0.85 WHIP (2nd), .177 BAA and .470 OPS (both lead AL) in April. On June 9, German was put on the 10-day injured list due to a hip strain. He was activated on July 3. In his first start back from the IL, German allowed a home run by Jeff McNeil on the first pitch, but it was the only run he allowed in 6 innings as the Yankees won 5–1 against the New York Mets.

On September 19, 2019, Germán was placed on administrative leave by MLB, pending an investigation of suspected domestic violence. On September 25, it was confirmed that he would not be eligible to participate in any baseball action for the remainder of 2019, including the postseason. He had the best win–loss percentage of MLB pitchers in 2019, at .818.

On January 2, 2020, Germán was suspended for the first 63 games of 2020, making his punishment for 81 games including time served in 2019 due to violating the league's personal conduct policy, the harshest suspension levied to a player on domestic violence allegations but not formally charged. He was also eligible to return on 2020 postseason, as most of his suspension was served during the 2019 postseason.

Following a 4–0 loss against the Tampa Bay Rays, the Yankees optioned Germán to the alternate site on April 10, 2021. Against the Boston Red Sox on July 25 at Fenway Park, he took a no-hitter into the bottom of the eighth inning. A leadoff double by Alex Verdugo ended the chance and Germán was pulled with a 4–0 lead. The Yankees would lose 5–4 due to relief pitchers Jonathan Loaisiga and Zack Britton allowing five unanswered runs. Germán finished the 2021 season with a 4–5 record and a 4.58 ERA.

Germán began the 2022 season on the 60-day injured list due to right shoulder impingement syndrome. He returned on July 21, 2022, making the start against the Houston Astros. During his return, Germán allowed 5 runs in 3 innings. He made 15 appearances (14 starts) in 2022, compiling a 3.61 ERA with 58 strikeouts across 72 1/3 innings pitched.

On April 15, 2023, in a start against the Minnesota Twins, Germán recorded a career-high 11 strikeouts in 6 1/3 innings pitched. In the same game, Germán was halted due to first base umpire James Hoye as well as second base umpire D.J. Reyburn finding his right hand to be tacky after the third inning and before the fourth inning. After Germán explained that his right hand was tacky due to a rosin bag, Hoye concluded that Germán was allowed to stay in the game as the rosin didn't affect his pitching, being simply instructed to wash his hands. On May 16, Germán was ejected for an illegal substance violation during an away game against the Toronto Blue Jays. James Hoye, who was the same umpire that initially inspected Germán on April 15, told a pool reporter that Germán's hand was "the stickiest hand I've ever felt. My fingers had a hard time coming off his palm.' Germán was suspected to have used an illegal substance during his 3 innings pitched in the game. However, Germán stated that it was "just the rosin bag" that caused the stickiness on his hands. Germán was ejected due to the consultation and agreement amongst four umpires that an illegal substance was used.' The next day, he was suspended 10 games and fined an undisclosed amount, a decision which he did not appeal.

Germán pitched the MLB's 24th perfect game on June 28, 2023, the first since Félix Hernández's perfect game on August 15, 2012, spanning 11 years. Germán's performance marked the fourth perfect game by a Yankees pitcher, the most by a single team in major league history. On August 2, the Yankees announced that Germán agreed to voluntarily submit to inpatient treatment for alcohol abuse. As a result, the organization placed him on the restricted list. Later, general manager Brian Cashman stated that Germán would not be active for the rest of the 2023 season.

On November 2, 2023, German was removed from the 40-man roster and placed on outright waivers. He cleared waivers and elected free agency on November 6.

=== Pittsburgh Pirates (2024) ===
On March 15, 2024, Germán signed a minor league contract with the Pittsburgh Pirates. The deal would have paid him $1.25 million while in the majors and came with a 2025 club option. He made 11 starts split between the Single-A Bradenton Marauders and Triple-A Indianapolis Indians, accumulating a 4–4 record and 5.13 ERA with 52 strikeouts over 54 1/3 innings pitched. Germán was released by the Pirates organization on July 16. On July 21, Germán re-signed with the Pirates on a new minor league contract. Germán was selected to the active roster on August 9, and made his Pirates debut that night. In 7 games (2 starts) for the Pirates, he struggled to a 7.84 ERA with 18 strikeouts over 20 2/3 innings pitched. Germán was designated for assignment by the Pirates on September 5. He cleared waivers and was sent outright to Indianapolis on September 8. Germán elected free agency on October 15.

=== Toros de Tijuana ===
On July 11, 2025, Germán signed with the Toros de Tijuana of the Mexican League. In 3 starts he threw 11 innings going 0–0 with a 4.91 ERA and 12 strikeouts.

== Personal life ==
Germán is of Dominican nationality, with Haitian ancestry.

Germán and his wife, Mara, married in 2021. They have three children.

=== Domestic violence suspension ===
In September 2019, Germán and Mara, his then-girlfriend, attended a charity gala held by CC Sabathia. Many of Germán's 2019 teammates were also there with their families. Sources revealed that Germán slapped his girlfriend at the event, but an investigation by Major League Baseball focused primarily on what happened at his home later that night. According to multiple league sources, including a person with knowledge of the MLB investigation, Germán was intoxicated and became physically violent toward his girlfriend until she hid in a locked room. She reportedly contacted the wife of one of Germán's teammates, and the couple drove to Germán's home late at night. She remained with the teammate's wife while the player attempted to calm down Germán, who was said to have been angry and belligerent. The incident was reported to MLB by a different member of the Yankees staff, whom Germán's girlfriend had told about it. She did not call law enforcement. On January 2, 2020, Germán was given an 81-game suspension for violating MLB's personal conduct policy.

== See also ==
- List of Major League Baseball perfect games
- List of Major League Baseball single-inning strikeout leaders

Achievements
Preceded by Félix Hernández	Perfect game pitcher June 28, 2023	Succeeded by Most recent
Preceded by Bryan Abreu, Cristian Javier, Rafael Montero, & Ryan Pressly	No-hitter pitcher June 28, 2023	Succeeded by Jason Foley, Alex Lange, & Matt Manning
