= Justin Shackil =

American sportscaster

New York Yankees
- Broadcaster
- Born: February 16, 1987 (age 39); Wayne, New Jersey, U.S.

Teams
- As Broadcaster: New York Yankees (2022–present)

Justin V. Shackil (born February 16, 1987) is an American sportscaster for the YES Network and WFAN. From April through October 2024, he was the primary radio announcer for the New York Yankees of Major League Baseball. Since 2022, he has been a boxing broadcaster for DAZN and Matchroom Boxing.

== Early life ==
Shackil is from Wayne, New Jersey. He attended Wayne Valley High School, where he anchored for the school's television station. He graduated in 2005. Shackil attended Fordham University, and worked for WFUV. He graduated from Fordham in 2009.

== Career ==
After graduating, Shackil announced in Minor League Baseball for the Gateway Grizzlies, Trenton Thunder, Tennessee Smokies, and Mobile BayBears. As a freelance broadcaster, he was a studio host for the NBA Network and anchored programs for SiriusXM, Entercom, and Westwood One.

In 2022, Shackil joined WFAN and substituted for John Sterling as the play-by-play announcer for the New York Yankees when Sterling was absent. WFAN named Shackil as Sterling's permanent substitute before the 2023 season. He also became host of the WFAN post-game show. Shackil also fills in on the YES Network and co-hosts a podcast with David Cone on Jomboy Media. While filling in for Sterling on June 28, 2023, Shackil called Domingo Germán's perfect game.

Following Sterling's retirement in April 2024, Shackil and Emmanuel Berbari assumed play-by-play duties for the Yankees for the remainder of the season. After the Yankees hired Dave Sims to succeed Sterling for the 2025 season, Shackil announced that he was stepping away from WFAN's postgame show to focus on television broadcasting. Shackil debuted as a lead play-by-play broadcaster for the YES Network when he called a series between the New York Yankees and the Athletics in May 2025.
