= List of Major League Baseball career games played as a left fielder leaders =

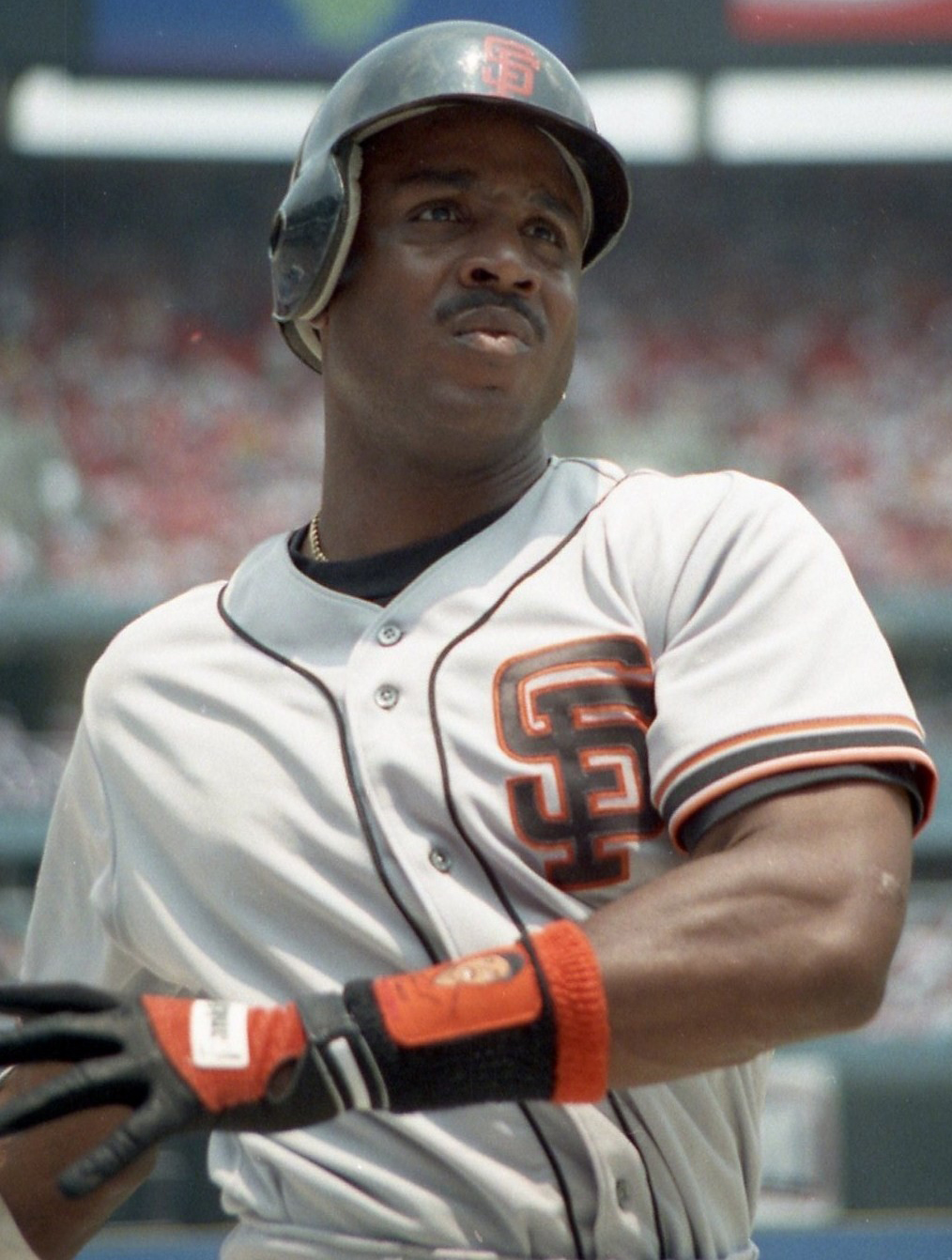
Barry Bonds, the all-time leader in games played as a left fielder.

Games played (most often abbreviated as G or GP) is a statistic used in team sports to indicate the total number of games in which a player has participated (in any capacity); the statistic is generally applied irrespective of whatever portion of the game is contested. In baseball, the statistic applies also to players who, prior to a game, are included on a starting lineup card or are announced as ex ante substitutes, whether or not they play; however, in Major League Baseball, the application of this statistic does not extend to consecutive games played streaks. A starting pitcher, then, may be credited with a game played even if he is not credited with a game started or an inning pitched. The left fielder (LF) is one of the three outfielders, the defensive positions in baseball farthest from the batter. Left field is the area of the outfield to the left of a person standing at home plate and facing toward the pitcher's mound. The outfielders' duty is to try to catch long fly balls before they hit the ground or to quickly catch or retrieve and return to the infield any other balls entering the outfield. The left fielder must also be adept at navigating the area of left field where the foul line approaches the corner of the playing field and the walls of the seating areas. Being the outfielder closest to third base, the left fielder generally does not have to throw as far as the other outfielders to throw out runners advancing around the bases, so they often do not have the strongest throwing arm, but their throws need to be accurate. The left fielder normally plays behind the third baseman and shortstop, who play in or near the infield; unlike catchers and most infielders (excepting first basemen), who are virtually exclusively right-handed, left fielders can be either right- or left-handed. In the scoring system used to record defensive plays, the left fielder is assigned the number 7.

Because game accounts and box scores often did not distinguish between the outfield positions, there has been some difficulty in determining precise defensive statistics prior to 1901; because of this, and because of the similarity in their roles, defensive statistics for the three positions are frequently combined. However, efforts to distinguish between the three positions regarding games played during this period and reconstruct the separate totals have been largely successful; players whose totals include pre-1901 games are notated in the table below. Barry Bonds is the all-time leader in career games played as a left fielder with 2,715. Rickey Henderson (2,421), Luis Gonzalez (2,418), Zack Wheat (2,328), Fred Clarke (2,186), and Lou Brock (2,161) are the only other players to appear in over 2,000 games in left field in their careers.

== Key ==
**Rank**	Rank amongst leaders in career games played. A blank field indicates a tie.
**Player (2026 Gs)**	Number of games played during the 2026 Major League Baseball season
**MLB**	Total career games played as a left fielder in Major League Baseball
*	Denotes elected to National Baseball Hall of Fame
†	Denotes total including pre-1901 games
**Bold**	Denotes active player (Note: A player is considered inactive if he has announced his retirement or has not played for a full season.)

== List ==
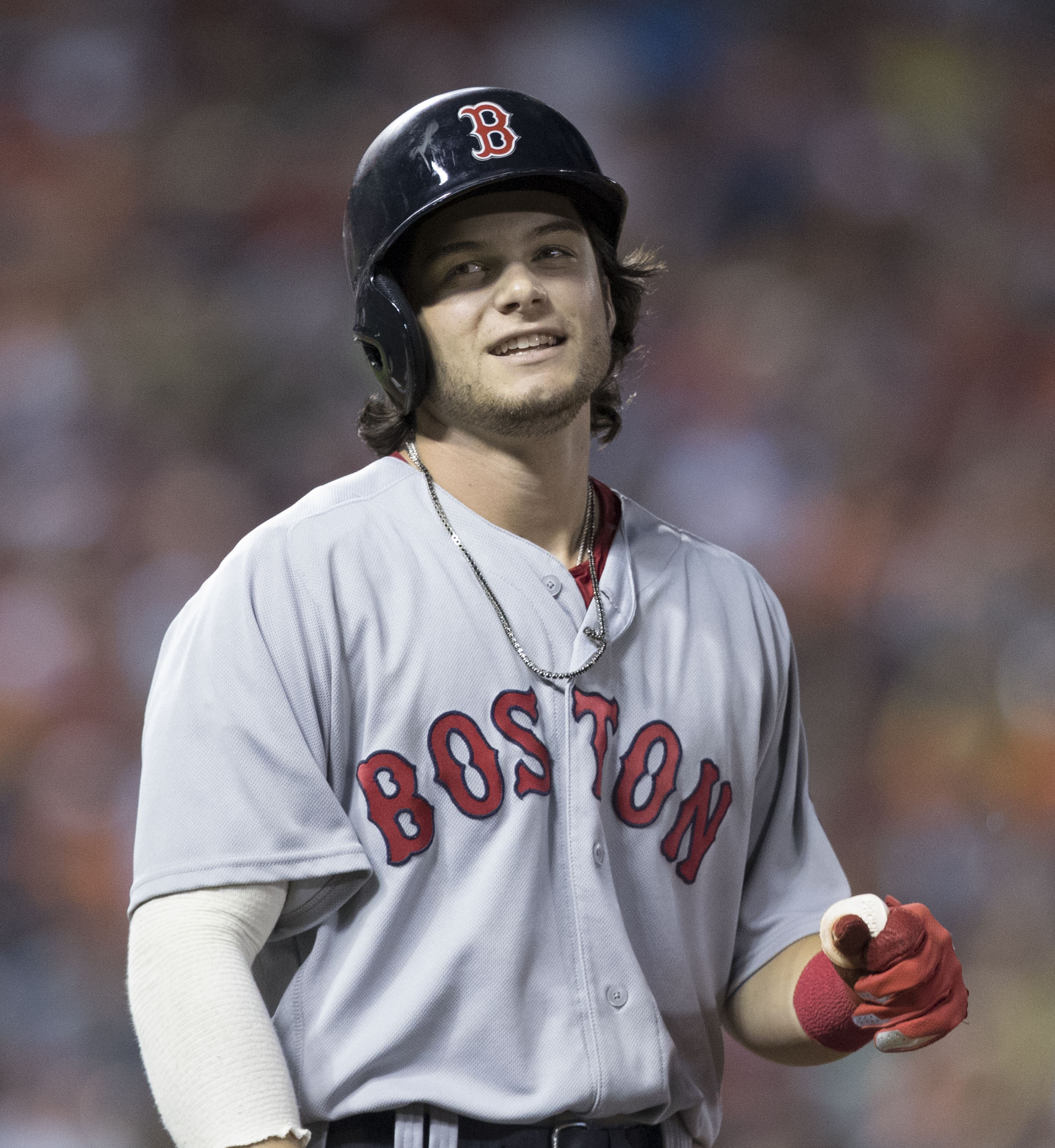
Andrew Benintendi, the active leader and 72nd all-time in games played as a left fielder.

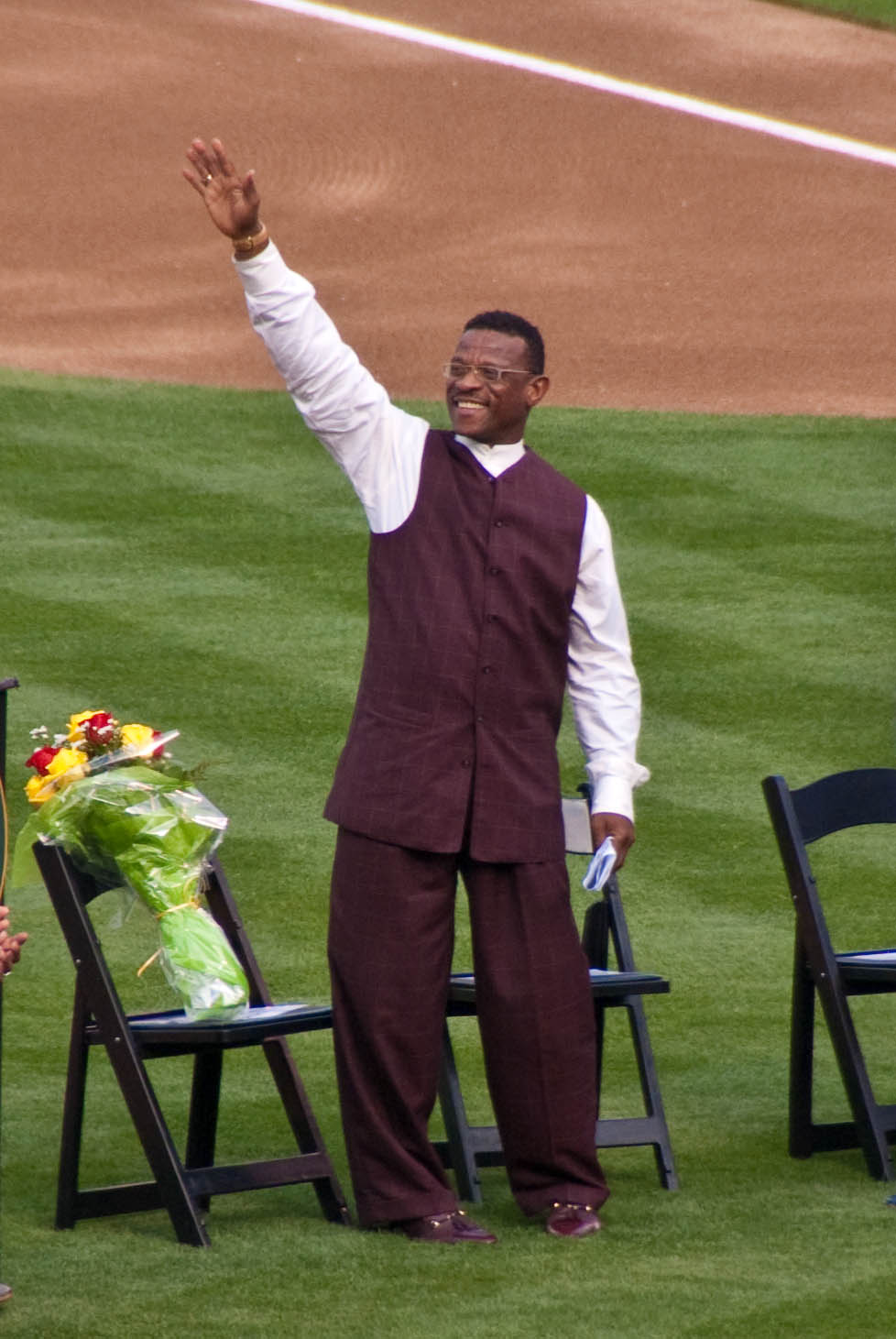
Rickey Henderson holds the American League record.

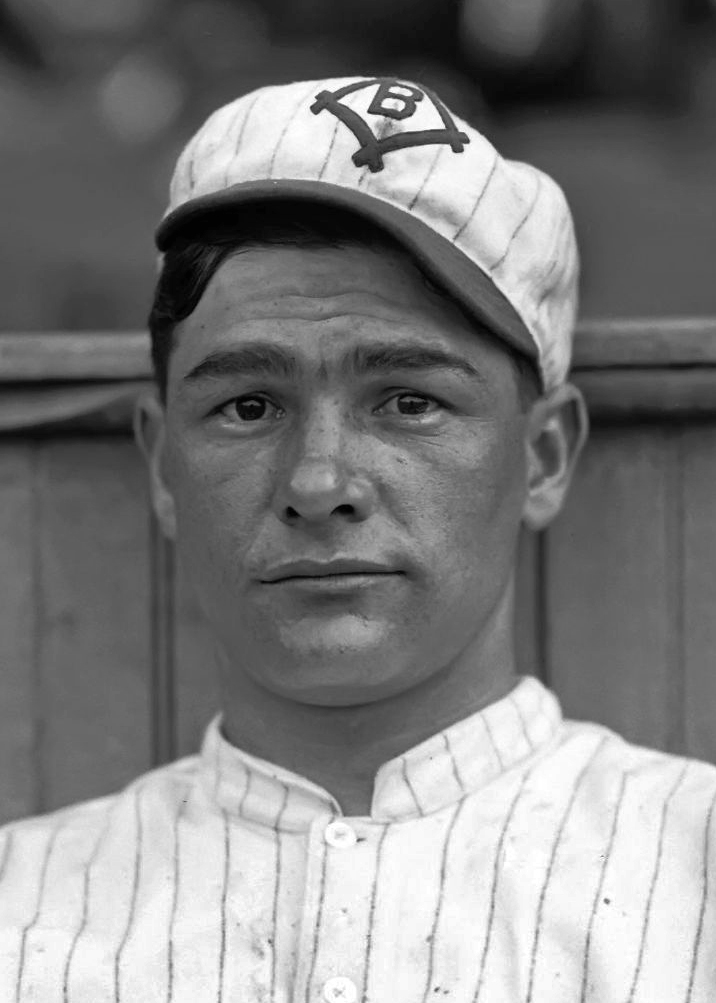
Zack Wheat held the major league record for 75 years.

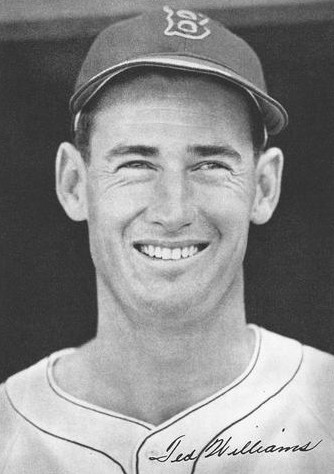
Ted Williams held the American League record for 42 years.

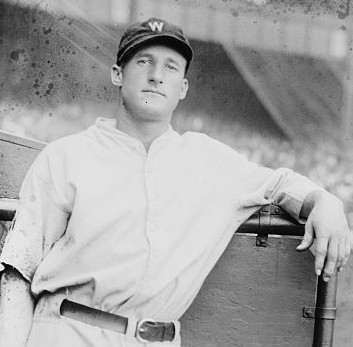
Goose Goslin held the American League record for 25 years.

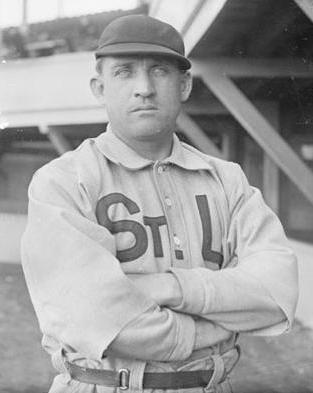
Jesse Burkett simultaneously held the National League and American League career records.

- Stats updated as of September 27, 2026.

Rank	Player (2026 Gs)	Games as a left fielder			Other leagues, notes
Rank	Player (2026 Gs)	MLB	American League	National League	Other leagues, notes
1	Barry Bonds	2,715	0	2,715	
2	Rickey Henderson*	2,421	1,985	436	Held major league record, 2001–2004
3	Luis Gonzalez	2,418	132	2,286	
4	Zack Wheat*	2,328	57	2,271	Held major league record, 1926–2001; held National League record, 1926–2003
5	Lou Brock*	2,161	0	2,161	
6	Ted Williams*	1,982	1,982	0	Held American League record, 1960–2002
7	Tim Raines*	1,961	771	1,190	
8	Goose Goslin*	1,946	1,946	0	Held American League record, 1935–1960
9	Carl Yastrzemski*	1,912	1,912	0	
10	Joe Medwick*	1,790	0	1,790	
11	Carlos Lee	1,770	876	894	
12	Billy Williams*	1,738	1	1,737	
13	Matt Holliday	1,711	93	1,618	
14	Bobby Veach	1,677	1,677	0	Held American League record, 1922–1935
15	Jimmy Sheckard †	1,669	0	1,669	
16	Sherry Magee	1,603	0	1,603	
17	Carl Crawford	1,595	1,322	273	
18	Bob Johnson	1,586	1,586	0	
19	George Foster	1,549	11	1,538	
20	Roy White	1,521	1,521	0	
21	Minnie Miñoso*	1,509	1,482	27	Negro League totals unavailable
22	Jim Rice*	1,503	1,503	0	
23	Raúl Ibañez	1,467	1,059	408	
24	Gary Matthews	1,446	0	1,446	
25	Duffy Lewis	1,414	1,414	0	Held American League record, 1919–1922
26	José Cruz	1,407	4	1,403	
27	Charlie Jamieson	1,393	1,393	0	
28	Garret Anderson	1,387	1,236	151	
29	Heinie Manush*	1,381	1,381	0	
30	Al Simmons*	1,372	1,285	87	
31	Alex Gordon	1,361	1,361	0	
32	Pat Burrell	1,327	1	1,326	
33	Fred Clarke* †	1,322	0	1,322	Held major league record, 1909–1926; held National League record, 1905–1926
34	Ralph Kiner*	1,307	87	1,220	
35	Del Ennis	1,290	25	1,265	
36	Joe Vosmik	1,278	1,239	39	
37	Greg Vaughn	1,262	828	434	
38	Lonnie Smith	1,258	273	985	
39	Jo-Jo Moore	1,248	0	1,248	
40	Moisés Alou	1,242	0	1,242	
	Ryan Braun	1,242	0	1,242	
42	Willie Stargell*	1,229	0	1,229	
43	Greg Luzinski	1,221	0	1,221	
44	George Burns	1,215	0	1,215	
45	Jason Bay	1,208	237	971	
	Gene Woodling	1,208	1,180	28	
47	Topsy Hartsel †	1,202	1,071	131	Held American League record, 1906–1909
48	Ron Gant	1,184	40	1,144	
49	Patsy Dougherty	1,180	1,180	0	Held American League record, 1909–1919
50	Jack Graney	1,172	1,172	0	
51	Joe Rudi	1,158	1,158	0	
52	Vince Coleman	1,153	196	957	
	Shannon Stewart	1,153	1,153	0	
54	Ken Williams	1,133	1,071	62	
55	Jeff Heath	1,127	1,001	126	
	Lou Piniella	1,127	1,127	0	
57	Mike Greenwell	1,124	1,124	0	
58	George Bell	1,123	977	146	
59	Willie Horton	1,112	1,112	0	
60	Bibb Falk	1,110	1,110	0	
61	Tommy Davis	1,103	303	800	
66	Ben Oglivie	1,100	1,100	0	
63	Dusty Baker	1,091	68	1,023	
64	Cliff Floyd	1,084	21	1,063	
65	Kevin McReynolds	1,069	198	871	
66	Alfonso Soriano	1,056	59	997	
67	Bob Bescher	1,053	0	1,053	
68	Babe Ruth*	1,047	1,025	22	
69	Brett Gardner	1,044	1,044	0	
70	Manny Ramirez	1,037	837	200	
71	Hank Sauer	1,029	0	1,029	
72	**Andrew Benintendi (10)**	1,028	1,028	0	
73	Leon Wagner	1,027	912	115	
74	Justin Upton	1,025	621	404	
75	Melky Cabrera	1,023	809	214	
	Adam Dunn	1,023	12	1,011	
77	Albert Belle	1,017	1,017	0	
78	Irish Meusel	1,016	1	1,015	
79	Gus Zernial	1,005	1,005	0	
80	Augie Galan	1,000	7	993	
81	Bernard Gilkey	996	7	989	
82	**Christian Yelich (2)**	980	0	980	
83	Al Martin	938	100	838	
84	**Ian Happ (150)**	936	0	936	
85	Alex Johnson	935	526	409	
86	Michael Brantley	934	934	0	
87	Stan Musial*	929	0	929	
88	Luis Polonia	927	909	18	
89	Steve Kemp	925	858	67	
90	Frank Howard	923	860	63	
91	**Eddie Rosario (0)**	913	653	260	
92	Geoff Jenkins	910	0	910	
93	Josh Willingham	906	340	566	
94	B.J. Surhoff	904	743	161	
95	Jeffrey Leonard	896	190	706	
96	Bob Skinner	893	0	893	
97	Carson Bigbee	890	0	890	
98	Riggs Stephenson	885	2	883	
99	Dale Mitchell	880	878	2	
100	Charlie Keller	874	874	0	

== Other Hall of Famers ==
Player	Games as a left fielder			Other leagues, notes
Player	MLB	American League	National League	Other leagues, notes
Frank Robinson*	834	130	704	
Chick Hafey*	788	0	788	
Jim O'Rourke* †	770	0	760	Includes 10 in Players' League
Max Carey*	660	0	660	
Hugh Duffy* †	571	9	555	Includes 7 in American Association
Monte Irvin*	546	0	490	Includes 56 in Negro National League (second) (incomplete)
Tommy McCarthy* †	514	0	463	Includes 41 in Union Association, 10 in American Association
Enos Slaughter*	509	119	390	
Harmon Killebrew*	471	471	0	
Dave Winfield*	465	351	114	
Billy Hamilton* †	434	0	424	Includes 10 in American Association
Chipper Jones*	356	0	356	
Kiki Cuyler*	332	0	332	
Joe Kelley* †	325	1	324	
Ichiro Suzuki*	117	53	64	
Andruw Jones*	112	110	2	
Dave Parker*	48	34	14	
Carlos Beltrán*	15	15	0	
