= Carlos Lee =

Panamanian baseball player (born 1976)

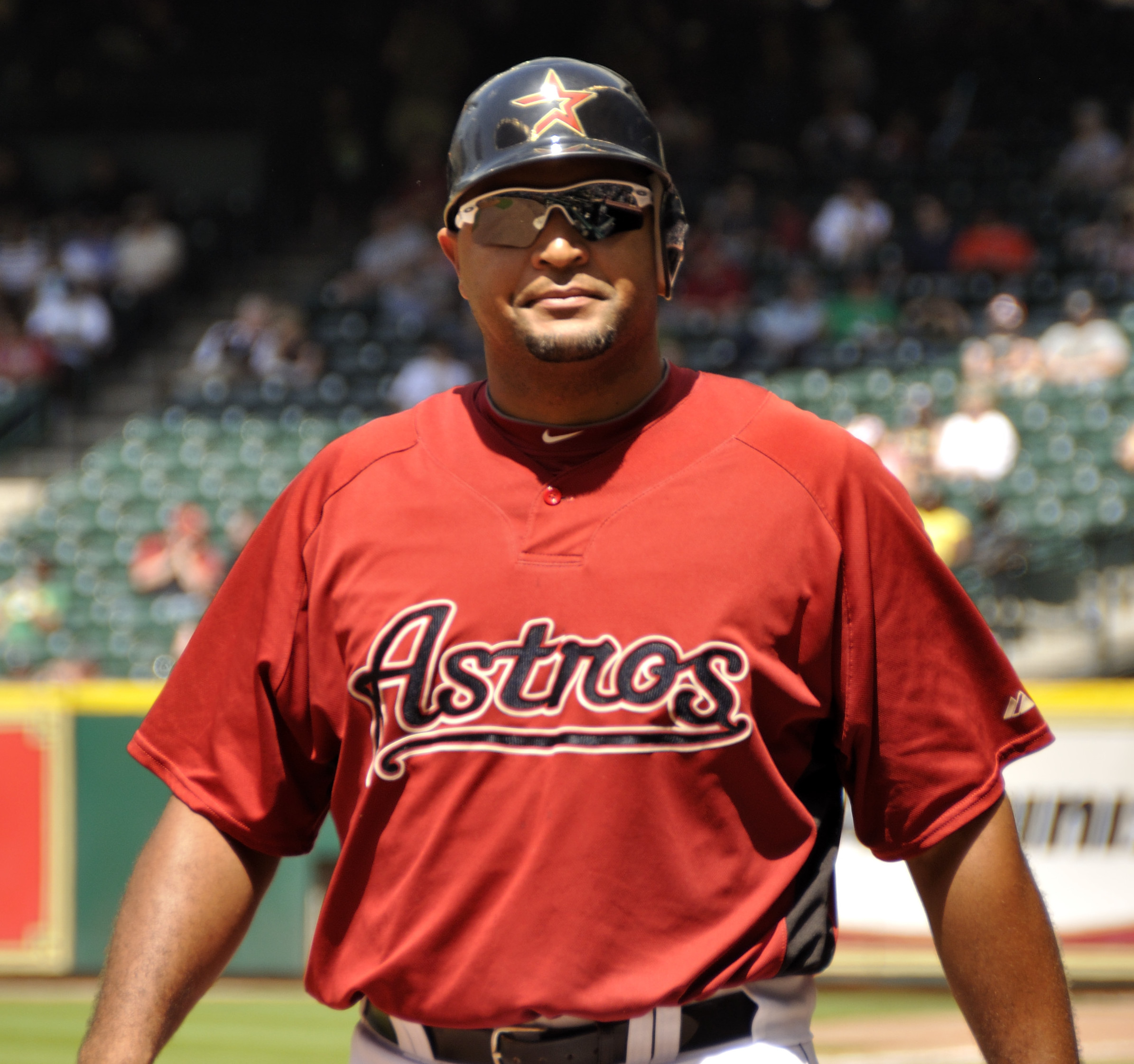
- Lee with the Astros in 2010
- Left fielder / First baseman
- Born: June 20, 1976 (age 50); Aguadulce, Panama
- Batted: Right Threw: Right

MLB debut
- May 7, 1999, for the Chicago White Sox

Last MLB appearance
- October 3, 2012, for the Miami Marlins

MLB statistics
- Batting average: .285
- Hits: 2,273
- Home runs: 358
- Runs batted in: 1,363
- Stats at Baseball Reference

Teams
- Chicago White Sox (1999–2004); Milwaukee Brewers (2005–2006); Texas Rangers (2006); Houston Astros (2007–2012); Miami Marlins (2012)

Career highlights and awards
- 3× All-Star (2005–2007); 2× Silver Slugger Award (2005, 2007)

Carlos Noriel Lee (born June 20, 1976), nicknamed "El Caballo", is a Panamanian former professional baseball left fielder and first baseman. He played in Major League Baseball (MLB) from 1999 to 2012 with the Chicago White Sox, Milwaukee Brewers, Texas Rangers, Houston Astros, and Miami Marlins. He had 17 career grand slams, ranking him seventh in MLB history (tied with Jimmie Foxx and Ted Williams); his seven grand slams hit with the Astros is a club record he shares with Jose Altuve and Alex Bregman.

== Professional career ==
=== Chicago White Sox ===
Lee made his major league debut with the Chicago White Sox on May 7, 1999, hitting a home run in his first Major League at-bat. In his rookie year, Lee hit .293 while driving in 84 runs in 127 games. He finished 7th in the AL Rookie of the Year voting. In 2000, Lee drove in 92 RBI while hitting 24 home runs. In 2001, Lee once again hit for power, hitting 24 home runs and driving in 84 runs but his average dipped from .301 the previous year to .269 in 150 games.

In 2002, Lee played in just 140 games but was consistent once again, driving in 80 runs while hitting 26 home runs. In 2003, Lee had his breakout season for the White Sox, playing in 158 games, Lee drove in 113 RBI while homering 31 times and scoring 100 runs. The following year, Lee continued his success, hitting 31 home runs and scoring 103 runs. He also drove in 99 RBI while hitting .305 for the White Sox.

After the season, Lee was traded to the Milwaukee Brewers in exchange for outfielder Scott Podsednik and pitcher Luis Vizcaíno.

=== Milwaukee Brewers ===
In 2005, Lee hit 32 home runs with 114 RBIs and an NL-leading 11 sacrifice flies. He was selected for the National League All-Star team in his first two seasons as a Brewer, and participated in the Home Run Derby in 2005. In 2005, he also won his first career Silver Slugger Award.

On July 28, 2006, he was traded to the Texas Rangers with minor league outfielder Nelson Cruz for outfielders Kevin Mench and Laynce Nix, relief pitcher Francisco Cordero, and minor league pitcher Julian Cordero. According to Brewers General Manager Doug Melvin, the Brewers attempted to re-sign Lee, but by July 27, it became apparent he would not sign a contract extension. The Brewers reportedly offered a four-year, $48 million contract extension, close to the four-year, $50 million extension David Ortiz signed earlier in 2006. Lee's agent Adam Katz said the two parties were too far away in negotiations.

=== Texas Rangers ===
In 59 games for the Rangers, Lee hit 9 home runs while hitting .322 while serving as their DH and left fielder. Between both the Brewers and the Rangers, Lee hit a career high 37 home runs while compiling 116 RBI in 161 games.

=== Houston Astros ===
On November 24, 2006, Lee agreed to a six-year, $100 million contract with the Houston Astros. Lee had a productive first year in Houston, hitting .303 with 32 home runs and driving in 119 runs, which was good for a three-way tie in the National League with Miguel Cabrera and Prince Fielder. Lee won his second career Silver Slugger Award in 2007, to become the third outfielder in team history, joining José Cruz (1983 and 1984) and Moisés Alou (1998).

In his second year, 2008, despite playing in just 115 games due to injury, Lee drove in 100 runs and homered 28 times for the Astros.

In 2009, he had the lowest range factor of all starting major league left fielders (1.56). Despite his limited range, Lee was a force once again at the plate, driving in 102 RBIs while hitting exactly .300 in 160 games.

In 2010, after Lance Berkman was dealt to the New York Yankees, Lee filled in for a handful of games at first base. While this was not the first time in his career he had played first, it was the first time he did so on a regular basis. Lee hit a career low .246 despite driving in 89 runs and homering 24 times for the Astros. In 2011, he was an above-average defender according to UZR and other statistical measurements.

Through 66 games in 2012 for Houston, Lee struck out just 17 times in 258 at bats. During his 6-year tenure with the Astros, Lee never struck out over 65 times in a season. He set the club record with seven grand slams.

=== Miami Marlins ===
On July 4, 2012, Lee was traded to the Miami Marlins for minor leaguers Matt Dominguez and Rob Rasmussen. He played his first game as a Marlin the next day against the Milwaukee Brewers, and went 2-for-4 with a run in a win. He hit his first home run as a Marlin, a grand slam, on July 17 against the Chicago Cubs. In 81 games for the Marlins, Lee hit .243 while homering 4 times in 338 plate appearances.

== International career ==
Lee represented the Panama national baseball team in international competition. At the 2006 World Baseball Classic, he slashed .182/.250/.182 over 12 plate appearances, with two hits and three strikeouts. At the 2009 World Baseball Classic, he slashed .143/.250/.143 over 8 plate appearances.

== Career statistics ==
In 2,099 games over 14 seasons, Lee compiled a .285 batting average (2,273-for-7,983) with 1,125 runs, 469 doubles, 19 triples, 358 home runs, 1,363 RBI, 125 stolen bases, 655 base on balls, 984 strikeouts, .339 on-base percentage and .483 slugging percentage. Defensively, he recorded a .988 fielding percentage playing left field and first base.

== Personal life ==
In reference to his nickname, Carlos has a fan club called Los Caballitos, which means "Little Horses". He is married and has two daughters, Cassandra and Karla and two sons, named Karlos and Carlos. Lee owns and operates cattle ranches in Aguadulce and Houston.

His younger brother, also named Carlos, also works in baseball. Carlos Humberto Lee, also known as Carlos Lee III, played professional baseball in the Chicago White Sox and Milwaukee Brewers' minor league systems from 2001–2007; he has since served as manager of the Chiriquí provincial team in Panama's Beisbol Mayor league.

== See also ==
- Grand slam (baseball)
- Houston Astros award winners and league leaders
- List of Houston Astros team records
- List of Major League Baseball career assists as a left fielder leaders
- List of Major League Baseball career doubles leaders
- List of Major League Baseball career games played as a left fielder leaders
- List of Major League Baseball career hits leaders
- List of Major League Baseball career home run leaders
- List of Major League Baseball career runs batted in leaders
- List of Major League Baseball career putouts as a left fielder leaders
- List of Major League Baseball players from Panama
- List of Major League Baseball players with a home run in their first major league at bat
- List of Milwaukee Brewers award winners and All-Stars
- List of Panamanians
