= Yasmani Grandal =

Cuban-born American baseball player (born 1988)

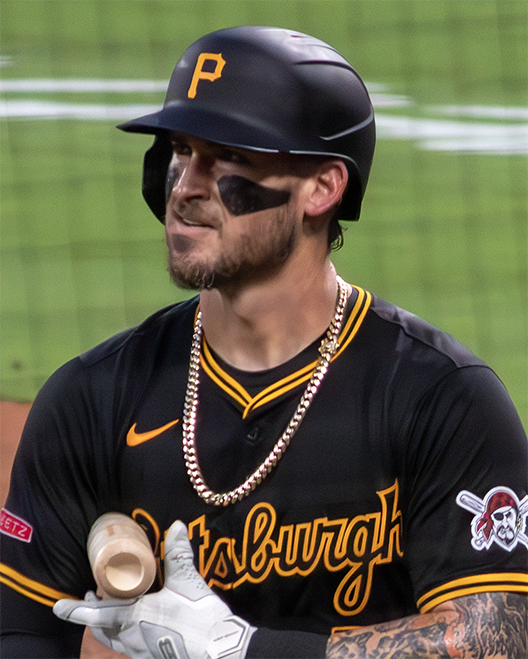
- Grandal with the Pittsburgh Pirates in 2024

Free agent
- Catcher
- Born: November 8, 1988 (age 37); Havana, Cuba
- Bats: Switch Throws: Right

MLB debut
- June 2, 2012, for the San Diego Padres

MLB statistics (through 2024 season)
- Batting average: .236
- Home runs: 194
- Runs batted in: 592
- Stats at Baseball Reference

Teams
- San Diego Padres (2012–2014); Los Angeles Dodgers (2015–2018); Milwaukee Brewers (2019); Chicago White Sox (2020–2023); Pittsburgh Pirates (2024)

Career highlights and awards
- 2× All-Star (2015, 2019)

Yasmani Grandal (born November 8, 1988) is a Cuban-American professional baseball catcher who is a free agent. He has previously played in Major League Baseball (MLB) for the San Diego Padres, Los Angeles Dodgers, Milwaukee Brewers, Chicago White Sox, and Pittsburgh Pirates. Grandal is a two-time MLB All-Star.

== Early years ==
Grandal was born in Havana, Cuba, where he played shortstop and third base on a junior national team. He emigrated to the United States with his mother, stepfather, and maternal grandparents at age 10 through the lottery system. He entered the United States in July 1999 and became a United States citizen five years later.

Grandal attended Miami Springs High School in Miami Springs, Florida, where Baseball America ranked him as the 19th-best high school baseball player in 2007. Grandal was rated as one of the top defensive catchers heading into the 2007 Major League Baseball draft, but there were some questions about his hitting ability. He was drafted in the 27th round by the Boston Red Sox but he did not think they made him an acceptable offer so he chose not to sign with them.

Grandal attended the University of Miami, where he played baseball for the Miami Hurricanes. He hit .234 as a freshman and .299 as a sophomore. In 2008, he played collegiate summer baseball with the Brewster Whitecaps of the Cape Cod Baseball League. In his 2010 season for the Hurricanes, he batted .401 with 15 home runs, 60 runs batted in (RBIs), and a .527 on-base percentage in 62 games. He was the Atlantic Coast Conference Player of the Year and finished second for the Golden Spikes Award behind Bryce Harper. He was also named to the 2010 NCBWA Division I All-America Team.

Grandal was inducted into the University of Miami Sports Hall of Fame as part of its Class of 2020 at its 52nd Induction Banquet on November 16, 2021.

== Professional career ==
=== Cincinnati Reds ===
The Cincinnati Reds selected Grandal in the first round, with the 12th overall selection, in the 2010 Major League Baseball draft. He signed a four-year, $3.2 million major league contract with the Reds on August 16, 2010, and was added to the Reds' 40-man roster. He made his professional baseball debut for the Arizona League Reds in 2010. In 28 at-bats, he had eight hits and four walks. Quickly rising through the farm system, Grandal batted .305 with 14 home runs and 68 RBIs for the Class A Bakersfield Blaze, Double-A Carolina Mudcats, and Triple-A Louisville Bats in 2011. He also played for the Phoenix Desert Dogs of the Arizona Fall League after the 2011 season.

=== San Diego Padres ===
==== 2012 ====
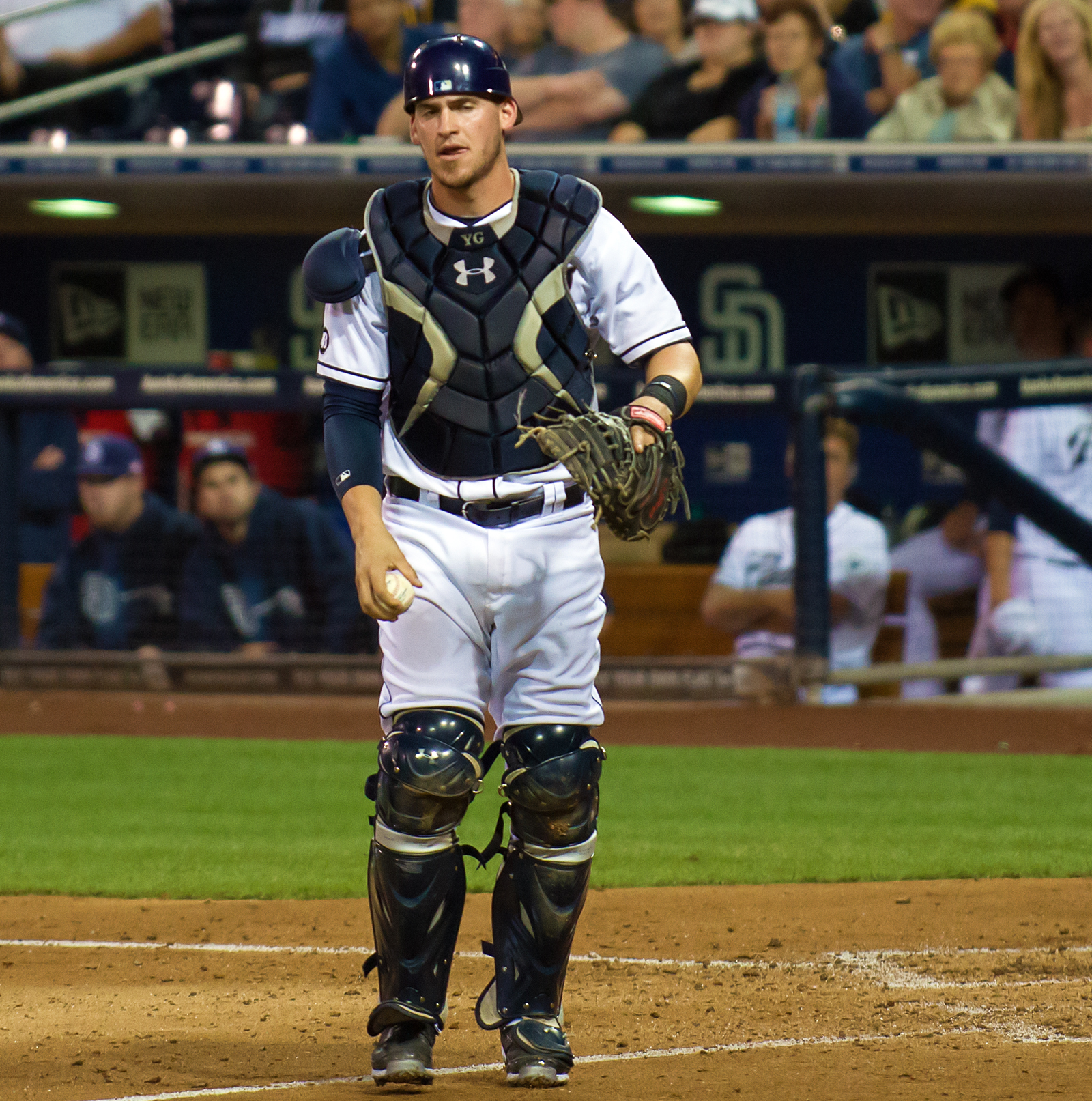
Grandal with the San Diego Padres in 2012

On December 17, 2011, the Reds traded Grandal, Edinson Vólquez, Yonder Alonso, and Brad Boxberger to the San Diego Padres for Mat Latos. Grandal was the third catcher on the Padres' 40-man roster at the time, behind Nick Hundley and John Baker on the depth chart.

He started the 2012 season with the Triple-A Tucson Padres. According to MLB.com, he was the Padres' third-ranked prospect and the fifth-best catching prospect in MLB. After batting .317 with a .421 OBP and four home runs, 23 RBIs in 120 at-bats, Grandal was promoted to San Diego as they needed another batter on the bench. He made his major league debut on June 2, 2012, entering as a defensive replacement and flying out in his only at-bat against the Arizona Diamondbacks. He was reassigned to Tucson the next day and was selected to appear in the 2012 All-Star Futures Game.

In his first major-league start, just hours after being recalled from Tucson on June 30, 2012, Grandal became the first player in MLB history to homer from both sides of the plate for his first career hits in the same game (against Colorado Rockies pitchers Christian Friedrich and Jeremy Guthrie). He was also the second Padre to have a pair of home runs in his first career start since Keith Lockhart accomplished the feat in 1994, and the fourth in team history to do it from each side of the plate in a single contest. He later became the seventh player to hit three home runs for his first three hits in the majors since 1900. (Note: The others were Keith McDonald (2000), Alfonso Soriano (1999–2000), Mike Greenwell (1985), Billy Conigliaro (1969), Ed Sanicki (1949) and Chick Fullis (1929).) On July 4, he hit a two-run pinch hit homer for his fourth homer in his first six hits. Grandal finished the year hitting .297/.394/.469 with 8 home runs and 36 RBI in 60 games, 52 of them starts.

On November 7, 2012, MLB suspended Grandal for 50 games for testing positive for having a high testosterone level. He did not appeal the suspension and served his suspension at the beginning of the 2013 season. In a January 2013 report, he, along with several other Major League Baseball players, was linked to Biogenesis of America, a clinic that allegedly produced performance-enhancing drugs.

==== 2013–2014 ====
On July 6, 2013, Grandal suffered a knee injury and left the game. An MRI revealed significant damage in the anterior cruciate ligament and medial collateral ligament, which prematurely ended his 2013 season. In 28 games in 2013, he hit .216 with one home run and nine RBIs. In 2014, despite posting a disappointing slash line, .225/.327/.401, Grandal stayed healthy throughout the season. He finished with career highs in every offensive category. His defense behind the plate remained a question mark as he displayed issues throwing out baserunners.

=== Los Angeles Dodgers ===
==== 2015 ====
On December 18, 2014, he was traded to the Los Angeles Dodgers (along with Joe Wieland and Zach Eflin) in exchange for Matt Kemp, Tim Federowicz and $32 million in cash.

On May 7, 2015, Grandal hit two three-run homers and recorded a career high eight RBIs in a game against the Milwaukee Brewers. On June 21, Grandal became the first Dodgers catcher with two home runs and a bunt single in one game since Roy Campanella on August 30, 1955. He was selected to the National League roster for the 2015 Major League Baseball All-Star Game, his first All-Star selection. He spent the second half of the season battling shoulder inflammation that negatively affected his performance. He only had three hits in the entire month of September and finished the season hitting .234 with 16 home runs and 47 RBI. He had arthroscopic surgery on his shoulder at the conclusion of the season and signed a one-year, $2.8 million, contract with the Dodgers, to avoid salary arbitration.

==== 2016 ====
On July 8, 2016, Grandal had five hits in five at-bats in a 10–6 win against the Padres, including three home runs. He was the third catcher in history with five hits in a three-homer game (Victor Martinez in 2004 and Walker Cooper in 1949) and the third Dodger catcher to ever have three homers in a game (Mike Piazza in 1996 and Roy Campanella in 1950). He stayed healthy all season and hit .228 in 126 games with a career high 27 homers and 72 RBI. After the season, Grandal signed a $5.5 million contract with the Dodgers for 2017, avoiding salary arbitration.

==== 2017 ====
Grandal hit two home runs against the Padres on April 3, 2017, one from each side of the plate. It was the first time a Dodger had ever done so on opening day in franchise history. In the 2017 season, Grandal played in 129 games, compiling a .247 batting average and 22 home runs. On defense, he tied for the major league lead in passed balls, with 16. During the regular season, Grandal started most of the games against right handed starters, in a platoon with Austin Barnes. However, during the post-season Barnes became the primary starter, with Grandal only starting two games (once in the 2017 NLDS and once in the 2017 NLCS). He had a total of eight at-bats in the playoffs, with no hits, but he did walk three times. In his final season of arbitration, Grandal agreed with the Dodgers on a 2018 contract of $7.9 million, the second highest contract for a Dodgers catcher, trailing only the $8 million that Mike Piazza made in 1998, his final season with the club.

==== 2018 ====
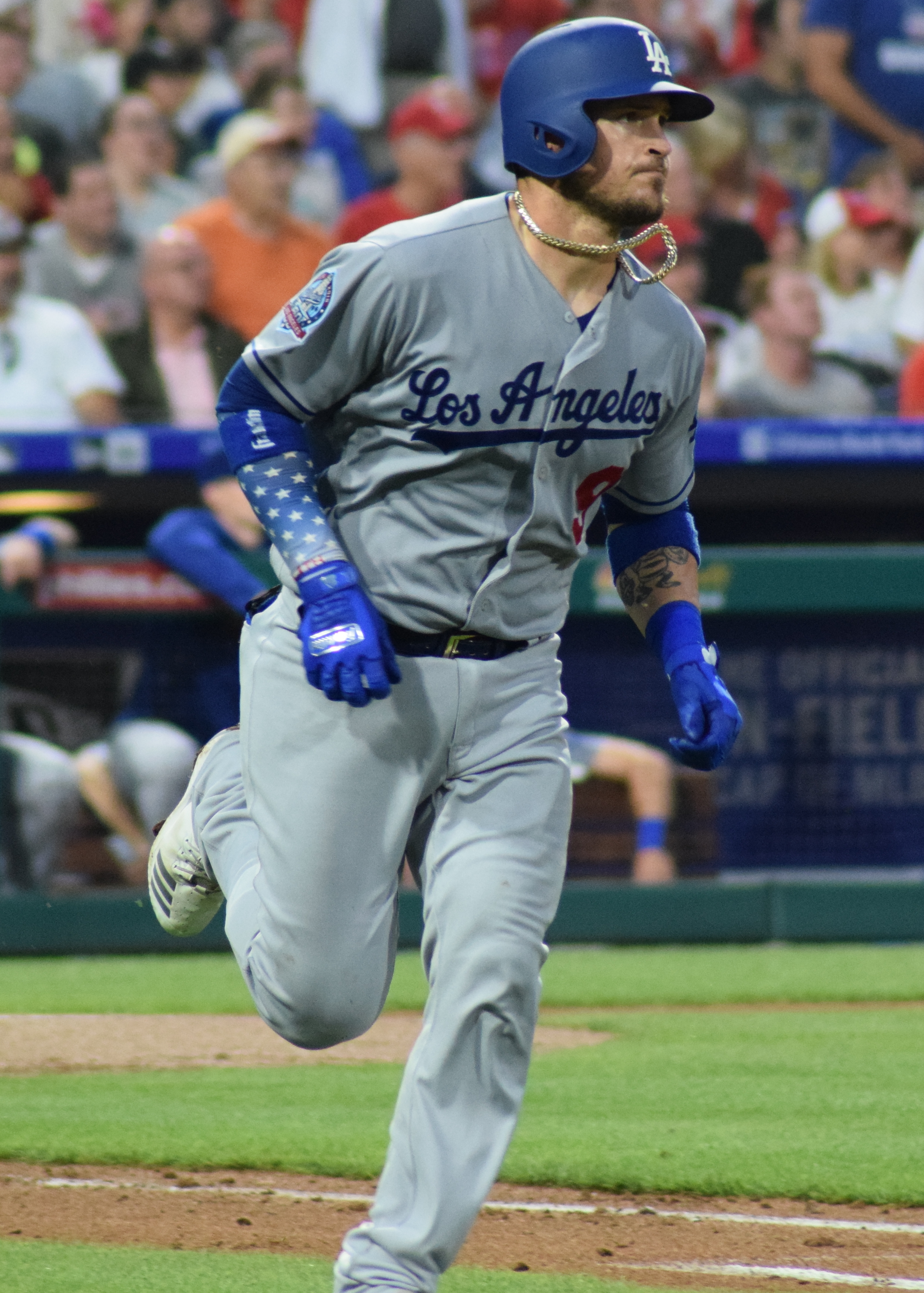
Grandal with the Los Angeles Dodgers in 2018

In 2018, he hit .241 in 140 games for the Dodgers with 24 homers and 68 RBI as he regained his primary starting job. However, in the post-season he had several defensive lapses which led to him again being replaced by Barnes in the starting lineup for the 2018 NLCS and 2018 World Series. The Dodgers extended a $17.9 million qualifying offer ahead of his pending free agency.

=== Milwaukee Brewers ===
Grandal signed a one-year contract with the Milwaukee Brewers on January 14, 2019, worth $18.25 million. The contract included a mutual option for the 2020 season. In 2019 he batted .246/.380/.468 with 28 home runs and 77 RBIs, led the National League in walk percentage (17.2%), swung at the lowest percentage of pitches (38.4%), and the lowest percentage of pitches inside the strike zone (59.5%), of all National League batters. On November 1, 2019, Grandal declined his half of the option and became a free agent.

=== Chicago White Sox ===
On November 21, 2019, Grandal signed a four-year, $73 million contract with the Chicago White Sox.

On July 24, 2020, Grandal was the starting catcher, making his White Sox debut on Opening Day against the Minnesota Twins. On July 5, 2021, Grandal collapsed after a check swing, experiencing pain in his left knee, and left the game. It was later revealed that Grandal had suffered a torn tendon in his left knee. Two days later, Grandal underwent surgery to fix his torn tendon. On August 27, 2021, in his first game since being reactivated, Grandal hit two home runs and tied a White Sox record with eight RBIs in a 17–13 win over the Chicago Cubs. Despite having a batting average of .240 in 93 games, Grandal hit 23 home runs with 62 RBIs in 2021. He became a free agent following the 2023 season.

=== Pittsburgh Pirates ===
On February 14, 2024, Grandal signed a one-year, $2.5 million contract with the Pittsburgh Pirates. In 72 games for Pittsburgh, he batted .228/.304/.400 with 9 home runs and 27 RBI.

=== Boston Red Sox ===
On April 10, 2025, Grandal signed a minor league contract with the Boston Red Sox. In 23 appearances for the Triple-A Worcester Red Sox, he batted .256/.372/.397 with two home runs and 16 RBI. On June 4, Grandal stepped away from the Red Sox organization, stating 'it's time to be a dad.' He was released by Boston on November 6.

== Personal life ==
Grandal's wife, Heather, is a nurse. Their son was born during the 2017 World Series. They also have a daughter. They reside in Chicago, Illinois, and have a second home in Arizona.

== See also ==
- List of Major League Baseball career putouts as a catcher leaders
- List of Major League Baseball players from Cuba
- List of Milwaukee Brewers award winners and All-Stars
- List of University of Miami alumn (athletics)
