= Tim Dillard =

American baseball player (born 1983)

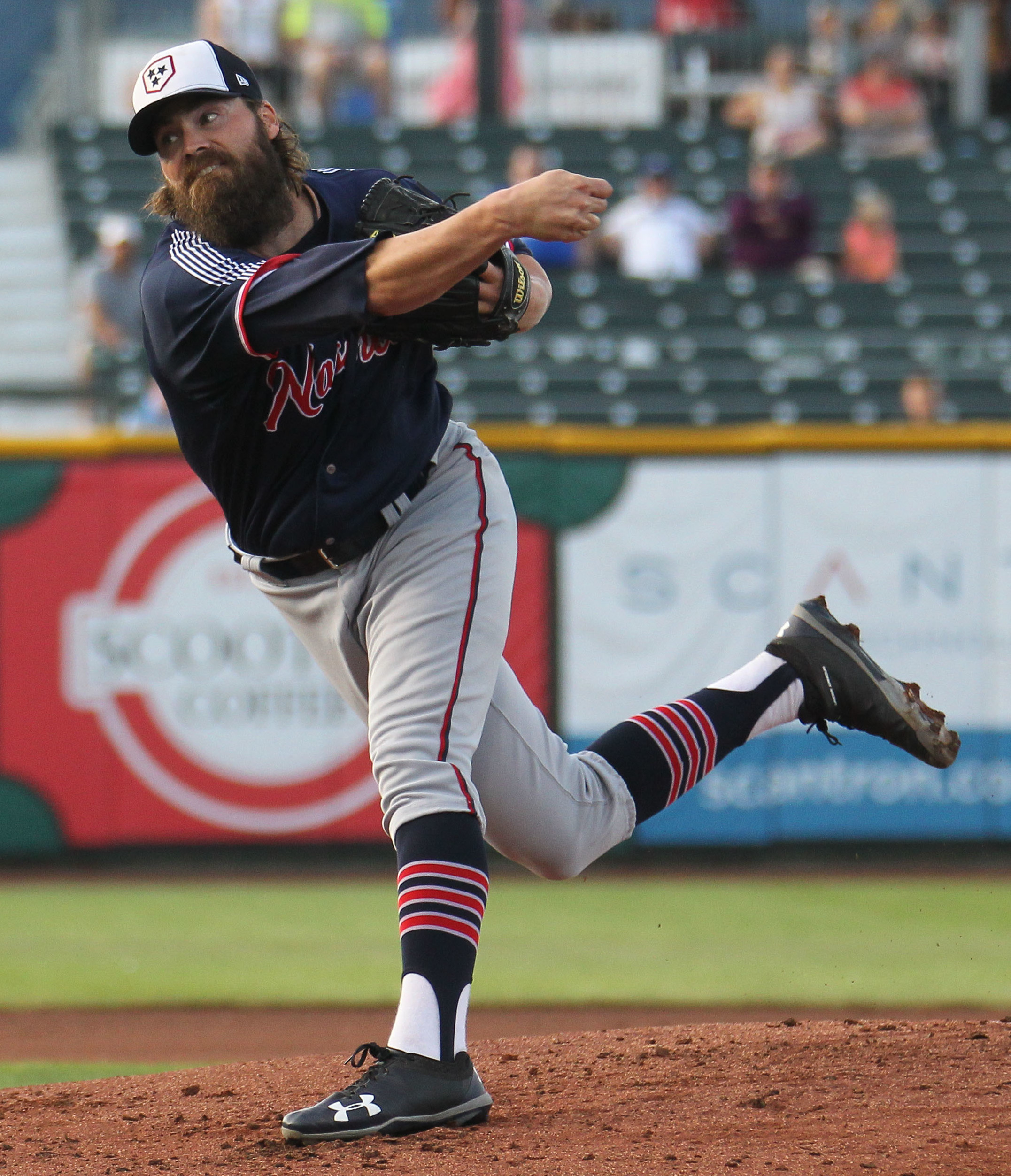
- Dillard with the Nashville Sounds in 2019
- Pitcher
- Born: July 19, 1983 (age 43); Sarasota, Florida, U.S.
- Batted: Right Threw: Right

MLB debut
- May 23, 2008, for the Milwaukee Brewers

Last MLB appearance
- July 7, 2012, for the Milwaukee Brewers

MLB statistics
- Win–loss record: 1–4
- Earned run average: 4.70
- Strikeouts: 62
- Stats at Baseball Reference

Teams
- Milwaukee Brewers (2008–2009, 2011–2012)

Timothy Charles Dillard (born July 19, 1983) is an American former professional baseball pitcher who played in Major League Baseball (MLB) for the Milwaukee Brewers. He is a pregame and postgame analyst for Brewers television broadcasts on BrewersTV / MLB Local Media, LLC.

Dillard made his MLB debut with Milwaukee in 2008. He pitched in 74 games as a reliever over the course of four seasons with the Brewers. In his 18-year professional career, Dillard spent most of his playing time with the Nashville Sounds Minor League Baseball team. While with Triple-A Nashville, he appeared in 242 games across nine seasons and set the Sounds' career records for wins, games pitched, innings pitched, and strikeouts.

In 2005, Dillard was named to the Florida State League postseason All-Star Team and chosen as the Milwaukee Brewers' Minor League Pitcher of the Year. He was selected for the 2006 Southern League All-Star Game the next season. His alma mater, Itawamba Community College, inducted him in their Athletic Hall of Fame in 2015.

== Amateur career ==
Dillard played catcher, and occasionally pitcher, at Saltillo High School in Saltillo, Mississippi. After his senior year, he was selected by the Milwaukee Brewers in the 15th round (448th overall) of the 2001 Major League Baseball draft. Having recently undergone left shoulder surgery, his hitting was not as proficient as the Brewers expected, so he instead attended Itawamba Community College (ICC) in Fulton, Mississippi. In his 2003 sophomore season, Dillard pitched and won a school-record 11 games for the Itawamba Indians including a win in the National Junior College Athletic Association (NJCAA) Division II College World Series. He was chosen as the NJCAA Player of the Year. The college honored him with induction in their Athletic Hall of Fame in 2015.

In the 2002 draft, Dillard was selected again by the Brewers, this time in the 34th round as the 1,009th overall pick. He signed with Milwaukee on May 27, 2003, after the conclusion of Itawamba's postseason run. Rather than play at catcher as previously drafted, the Brewers chose to utilize him as a pitcher.

== Professional career ==
=== Milwaukee Brewers (2003–2018) ===
Dillard began his professional baseball career in 2003, pitching for the Rookie Arizona League Brewers and Helena Brewers. He played in 14 games, made 4 starts, and went 1–2 with a 3.29 ERA. In 2004, Dillard was primarily a reliever for the Single–A Beloit Snappers. He went 2–5 in 43 appearances with a 3.94 ERA and was second on the team in saves (10).

Dillard played for the High–A Brevard County Manatees in 2005, making 28 starts, and accumulating a 12–10 record with a 2.48 ERA. He led the Florida State League in games started (28), innings pitched (185 1/3), complete games (5), and shutouts (2). He also came in second in wins (12) and fifth in strikeouts (128). Dillard was named to the league's postseason All-Star team in recognition of his performance. He was also selected by the Brewers as their Minor League Pitcher of the Year.

In 2006, while playing for the Double-A Huntsville Stars, Dillard made 25 starts and 4 relief appearances. In those 29 games, he went 10–7 with a 3.26 ERA. He led the Stars in wins (10), starts (25), innings pitched (163), and came in second in strikeouts (108). He was also selected to participate in the midseason Southern League All-Star Game, in which he pitched a scoreless inning of relief and allowed only one hit.

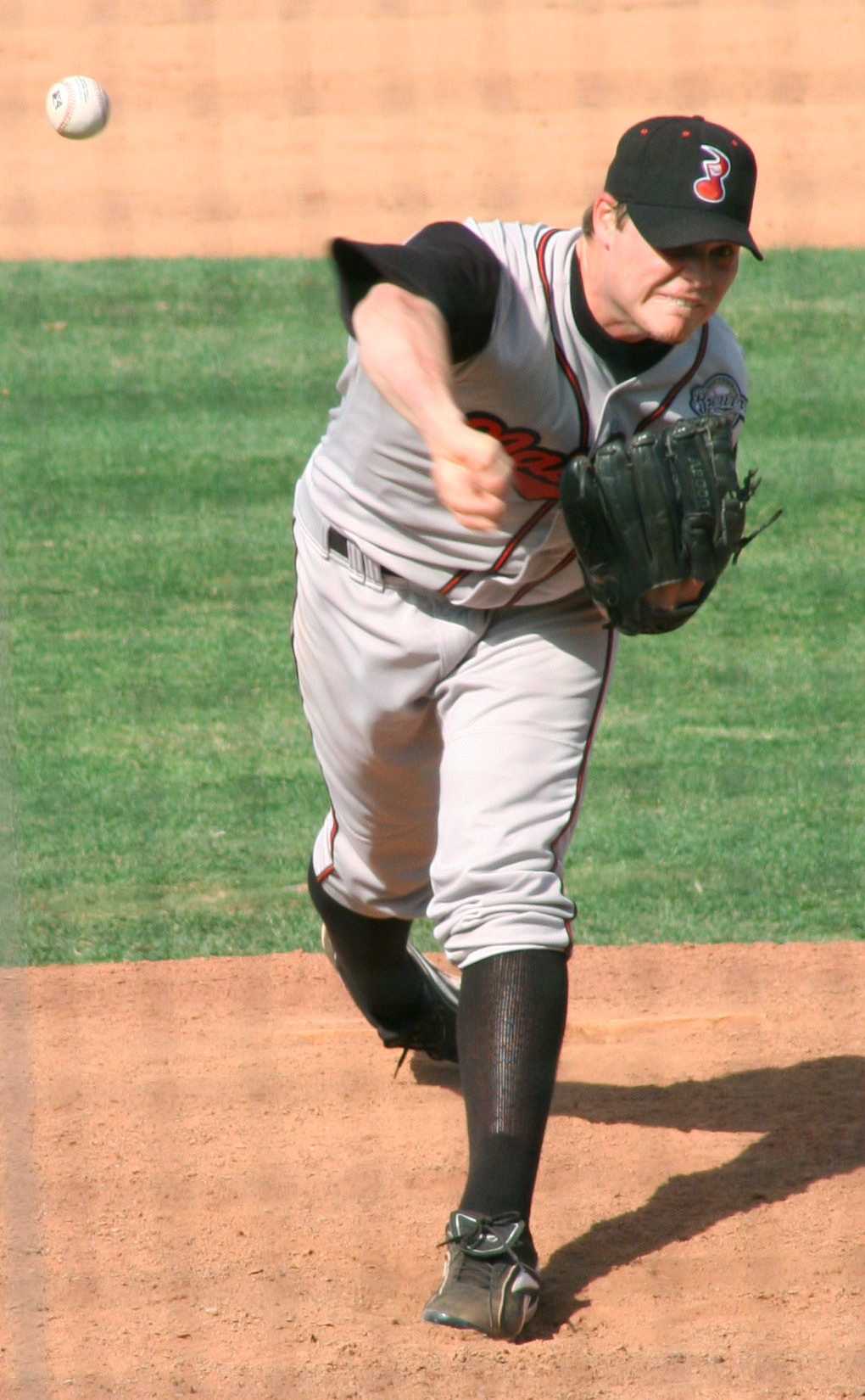
Dillard pitching for the Nashville Sounds in 2008 using an over-the-top delivery

Dillard reached the Triple-A level in 2007, playing for the Nashville Sounds. He went 8–4 with a 4.74 ERA in 34 games (16 starts). On November 19, his contract was purchased by the Brewers, protecting him from the Rule 5 draft. He was later optioned back to Nashville on March 15, 2008, where he began the season. On May 23, Dillard was called up to the majors for the first time in his career. He made his major league debut that night against the Washington Nationals, pitching one scoreless inning and striking out Aaron Boone. He returned to Nashville in late June, but was recalled to Milwaukee that September. Over 13 games with Milwaukee, he pitched 14 1/3 innings of relief and accumulated a 4.40 ERA with 5 strikeouts. In Nashville, he went 6–1 with a 1.99 ERA and 55 strikeouts out of the bullpen. He was selected to participate in the Arizona Fall League with the Mesa Solar Sox after the season.

Dillard played the majority of the 2009 season with the Nashville Sounds, though he did make two relief appearances with Milwaukee in late July. In 24 appearances with the Sounds, he went 11–7 with a 4.51 ERA and 64 strikeouts versus 0–1 with a 12.46 ERA and 1 strikeout with the Brewers. He was designated for assignment prior to the 2010 season to make room on the Brewers' roster for Marco Estrada. He cleared waivers and was assigned to Nashville where he played the entire season. During the 2010 campaign, Dillard completely overhauled his pitching delivery from a traditional over-the-top delivery to a sidearm delivery. In Nashville, he made 8 starts and 33 relief appearances, pitching to a 5–7 record with a 4.12 ERA and 82 strikeouts.

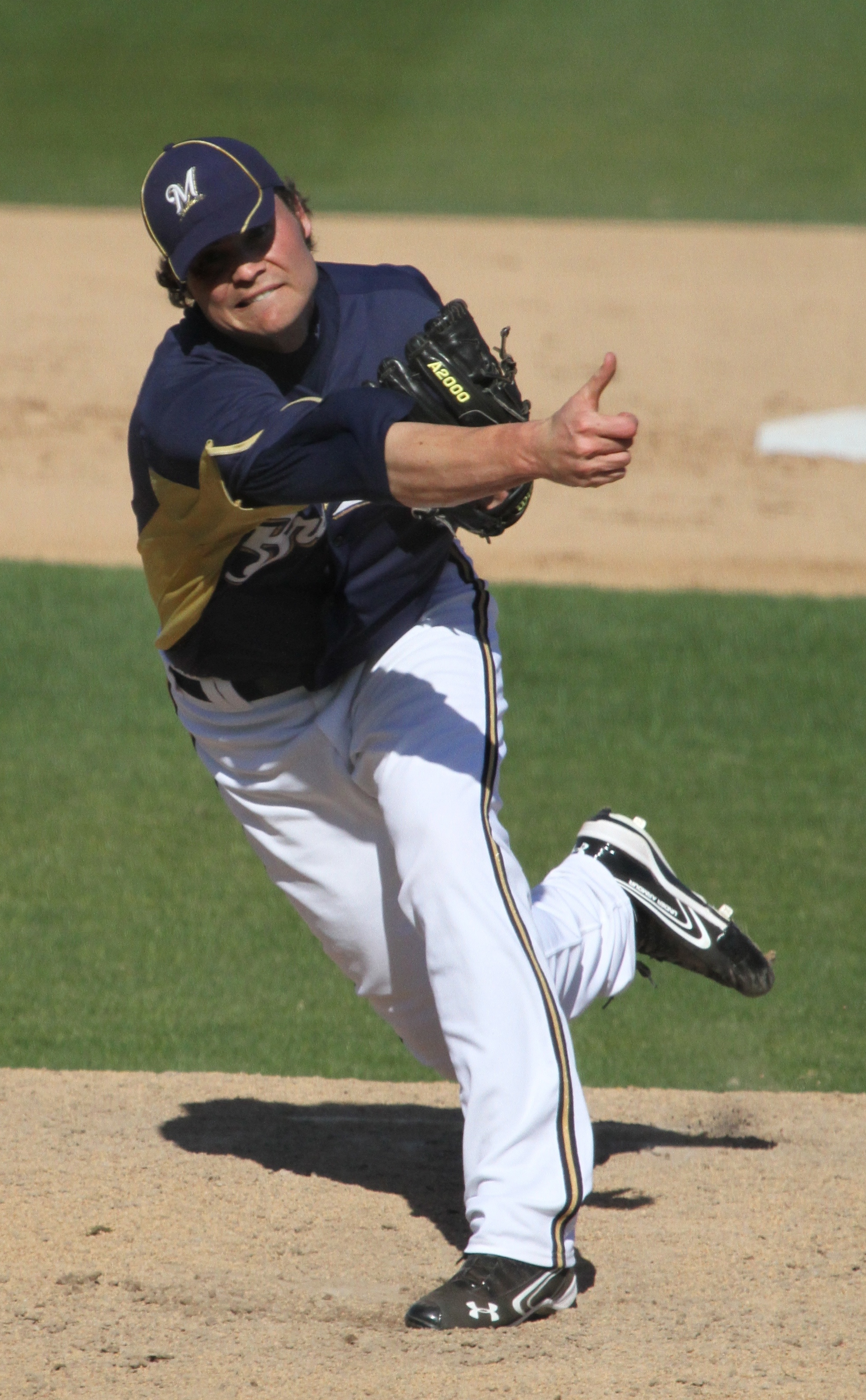
Dillard pitching for the Milwaukee Brewers in 2012 using a sidearm delivery

He received an invitation to spring training with the Brewers in 2011. Beginning the season at Nashville, Dillard was recalled by the Brewers on May 13. He was subsequently optioned to Nashville and recalled twice over the course of the season. In Milwaukee, he made 24 relief appearances, going 1–1 with a 4.08 ERA and 27 strikeouts, while he made 17 relief appearances in Nashville, going 4–2 with a 3.58 ERA and 30 strikeouts. He began the 2012 season with Milwaukee, but was outrighted to Nashville on July 11 after accumulating a 4.38 ERA with 29 strikeouts over 34 games out of the bullpen. With a minor league ERA at nearly 10.00, he was reassigned to Double-A Huntsville in late August and elected free agency after the season. Between Nashville and Huntsville, his 2012 minor league record was 1–1 with an 8.38 ERA and 17 strikeouts in 17 games.

Dillard signed a contract with Lancaster Barnstormers of the independent Atlantic League of Professional Baseball for 2013. He pitched in six games before signing a minor league contract with the Brewers on May 4. He spent the rest of the season at Triple-A Nashville before again electing free agency. Dillard signed with Lancaster for the 2014 season, appearing in two games, only to sign with the Brewers on May 1 and be assigned to Double-A Huntsville. He was promoted to Nashville on August 23. Over eight seasons with the Nashville Sounds (2007–2014), Dillard set the team's career franchise records for wins (39), innings pitched (556 2/3), and runs allowed (302). He pitched for the Águilas del Zulia of the Venezuelan Winter League during the 2014–15 offseason.

In 2014, Milwaukee had offered Dillard a coaching position, but he turned it down, asking instead for another playing contract. He attended spring training with the Brewers in 2015 and was assigned to the Rookie Helena Brewers in a paper move. He bounced back and forth between Helena's roster and pitching for the Triple-A Colorado Springs Sky Sox for the rest of the season in a fill-in role when other pitchers were injured. He chose to become a free agent after the season, but was re-signed for 2016. He spent the entire 2016, 2017, and 2018 seasons with Colorado Springs, each time becoming a free agent and ultimately re-signing for the next year. After the 2018 campaign, however, the Brewers released him unconditionally.

=== Texas Rangers (2019–2020) ===
Former Nashville teammate Chris Woodward, who had been hired as the manager of the Texas Rangers in late 2018, encouraged Rangers general manager Jon Daniels to sign Dillard so as to utilize his veteran clubhouse presence in service as a mentor to younger players. On December 17, 2018, Dillard signed a minor league contract with Texas for 2019, and he was assigned to the Triple-A Nashville Sounds, which had since become part of the Rangers organization. This arrangement allowed Dillard, who resides in Nashville, the opportunity to pitch close to his family.

The Rangers informed him he would not see regular play but would be used only when absolutely necessary. By the end of April, however, Dillard was added to the starting rotation, and ended the season having pitched 153 1/3 innings, more than any other pitcher for a single team in Minor League Baseball. In his second stretch with the Sounds, he set the franchise career records for games pitched (242) and strikeouts (437) while adding to his existing marks for wins (48) and innings pitched (710). Dillard became a free agent following the 2019 season, but he was later re-signed to a minor league contract with an invitation to spring training. He was assigned to Nashville for 2020 before the COVID-19 pandemic caused the cancellation of the minor league season.

With a lack of affiliated Minor League Baseball in 2020, Dillard, still under contract with Texas, was loaned to the Milwaukee Milkmen of the independent American Association on August 15. The Milkmen, with Dillard in the starting rotation, won the American Association championship. After the conclusion of their season on September 18, he was returned to the Rangers. Dillard later elected free agency but subsequently returned to the Rangers on a minor league contract for 2021. He was, however, released by the Rangers on February 25, 2021.

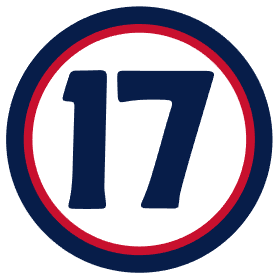
Tim Dillard's number 17 was retired by the Nashville Sounds in 2022.

Dillard announced his retirement from professional baseball on March 10, 2021. The Nashville Sounds honored Dillard by retiring his uniform number, 17, in a ceremony at First Horizon Park on July 29, 2022.

== Broadcasting career ==
After retiring from playing in 2021, Dillard was hired to serve as the primary pregame and postgame analyst on Brewers Live telecasts as well as provide color commentary for select games on BrewersTV / MLB Local Media, LLC. He previously appeared on Brewers pregame broadcasts in their 2018 postseason run.

== Personal life ==
Dillard is the son of former major league infielder Steve Dillard and brother of former professional baseball player Andy Dillard. He resides in Nashville, Tennessee, with his family. Off the field, Dillard is known for his social media videos in which he often involves teammates.

== See also ==
- List of second-generation Major League Baseball players
