= List of Milwaukee Brewers award winners and All-Stars =

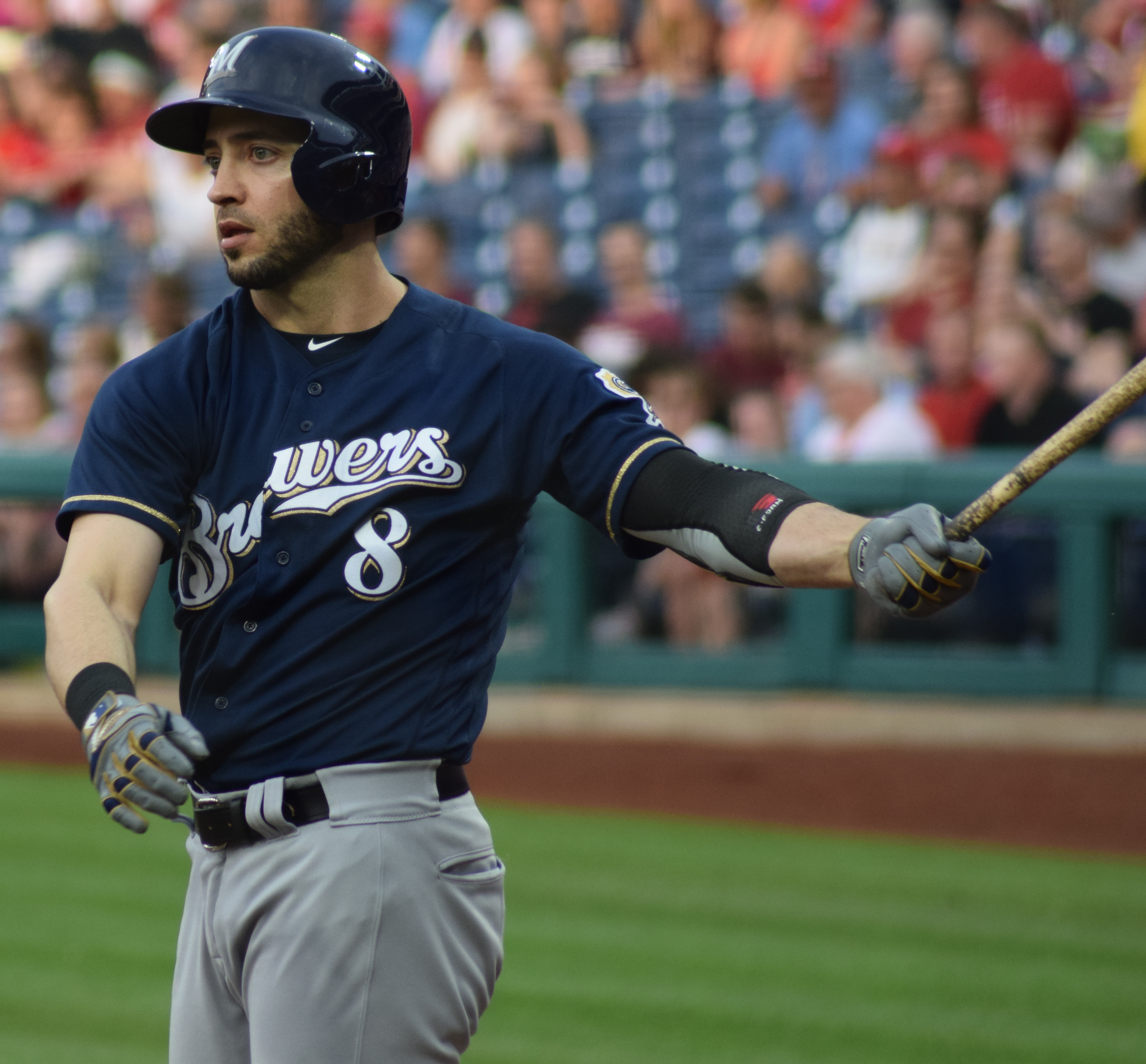
Ryan Braun won seven MLB year-end awards during his 2007 to 2020 Brewers career, more than any other player in franchise history.

The Milwaukee Brewers are a Major League Baseball (MLB) franchise based in Milwaukee, Wisconsin. Established in Seattle, Washington, as the Seattle Pilots in 1969, the team became the Milwaukee Brewers after relocating to Milwaukee in 1970. The franchise played in the American League (AL) until 1998 when it moved to the National League (NL) in conjunction with a major league realignment. This list documents players and personnel who have won MLB awards or been selected for MLB All-Star teams.

Four Brewers have won the Most Valuable Player Award: Ryan Braun, Rollie Fingers, Christian Yelich, and Robin Yount. Four have won the Cy Young Award: Corbin Burnes, Rollie Fingers, Pete Vuckovich, and Jacob Misiorowski. Three have won the Rookie of the Year Award: Ryan Braun, Pat Listach, and Devin Williams. One has won the Manager of the Year Award: Pat Murphy. Two have won the Hank Aaron Award: Prince Fielder and Christian Yelich. Dave Parker is the only Brewer to win the Edgar Martínez Award. Two have won the Rolaids Relief Man Award: John Axford and Rollie Fingers. Two others have won the Trevor Hoffman Award: Josh Hader and Devin Williams. Cecil Cooper is the only Brewer to win the Roberto Clemente Award. Eight have won the Rawlings Gold Glove Award. Two have won the Wilson Defensive Player of the Year Award. Eleven have won the Silver Slugger Award. Eight have been selected for All-MLB Teams. Eight have won the Player of the Month Award. Six have won the Pitcher of the Month Award. Six have won the Rookie of the Month Award. One broadcaster has won the Ford C. Frick Award: Bob Uecker.

Ryan Braun won seven MLB year-end awards during his 2007 to 2020 Brewers career, more than any other player in franchise history. He is followed by Cecil Cooper, Christian Yelich, and Robin Yount with six each. Braun was also selected for the MLB All-Star Game six times, more than any other Brewer. His is followed by Cecil Cooper and Paul Molitor (5); Josh Hader, Don Money, and Ben Sheets (4); Corbin Burnes, Prince Fielder, Ben Oglivie, Dan Plesac, Christian Yelich and Robin Yount (3); William Contreras , Rollie Fingers, Carlos Gómez, Corey Hart, Carlos Lee, Jonathan Lucroy, Jacob Misiorowski, Freddy Peralta, Francisco Rodríguez, Richie Sexson, Ted Simmons, Greg Vaughn, Devin Williams, and Brandon Woodruff (2).

Seventy-three Brewers have been selected to play in the MLB All-Star Game. Of these, 26 have been selected on more than one occasion. Prince Fielder is the only Brewer to win the All-Star Game Most Valuable Player Award. Of the nine Brewers selected to participate in the Home Run Derby held during the All-Star break, Fielder is the only Brewer to win the contest.

== Key ==
Position	Indicates the player's primary position or the position for which an award was given
Role	Indicates a pitcher's primary role
AL	Indicates the player won the American League version of the award (1969–1997)
NL	Indicates the player won the National League version of the award (1998–present)
(#)	Number of wins by individuals who won an award multiple times
†	Indicates the player started in an All-Star Game

== Awards ==
=== Most Valuable Player Award ===
Four Brewers have won the Major League Baseball Most Valuable Player Award—two in the American League and two in the National League. Robin Yount is the only Brewer to win the award twice.

Season	Name	Position	Ref.
1981^{AL}	Rollie Fingers	Pitcher	
1982^{AL}	Robin Yount (1)	Shortstop	
1989^{AL}	Robin Yount (2)	Center fielder	
2011^{NL}	Ryan Braun	Left fielder	
2018^{NL}	Christian Yelich	Left fielder	

=== Cy Young Award ===
Four Brewers have won the Cy Young Award—two in the American League and two in the National League.

Season	Name	Role	Ref.
1981^{AL}	Rollie Fingers	Closing pitcher	
1982^{AL}	Pete Vuckovich	Starting pitcher	
2021^{NL}	Corbin Burnes	Starting pitcher	
2026^{NL}	Jacob Misiorowski	Starting pitcher	

=== Rookie of the Year Award ===
Three Brewers have won the Major League Baseball Rookie of the Year Award—one in the American League and two in the National League.

Season	Name	Position	Ref.
1992^{AL}	Pat Listach	Shortstop	
2007^{NL}	Ryan Braun	Third baseman	
2020^{NL}	Devin Williams	Pitcher	

=== Manager of the Year Award ===
One Brewers manager has won the Manager of the Year Award.

Year	Name	Ref.
2024^{NL}	Pat Murphy (1)	
2025^{NL}	Pat Murphy (2)	
2026^{NL}	Pat Murphy (3)	

=== Executive of the Year Award ===
One Brewers executive has won the Executive of the Year Award.

Year	Name	Ref.
2024	Matt Arnold (1)	
2025	Matt Arnold (1)	

=== Hank Aaron Award ===
Two Brewers have won the Hank Aaron Award. Christian Yelich is the only Brewer to win the award twice.

Season	Name	Position	Ref.
2007^{NL}	Prince Fielder	First baseman	
2018^{NL}	Christian Yelich (1)	Left fielder	
2019^{NL}	Christian Yelich (2)	Right fielder	

=== Edgar Martínez Award ===
One Brewer won the Edgar Martínez Outstanding Designated Hitter Award.

Season	Name	Ref.
1990	Dave Parker	

=== Rolaids Relief Man Award ===
Two Brewers won the Rolaids Relief Man Award.

Season	Name	Ref.
1981^{AL}	Rollie Fingers	
2011^{NL}	John Axford	

=== Trevor Hoffman Award ===
Two Brewers have won the Trevor Hoffman National League Reliever of the Year Award.

Season	Name	Ref.
2018	Josh Hader (1)	
2019	Josh Hader (2)	
2020	Devin Williams (1)	
2021	Josh Hader (3)	
2023	Devin Williams (2)	

=== Roberto Clemente Award ===
One Brewer has won the Roberto Clemente Award.

Season	Name	Position	Ref.
1983	Cecil Cooper	First baseman	

=== Rawlings Gold Glove Award ===
Nine Brewers have won the Rawlings Gold Glove Award. George Scott, Cecil Cooper and Brice Turang are the only Brewers to win the award multiple times. Cumulatively, the Brewers have won seven at first base, two at second base, one at shortstop, and five at outfield for a total of 15 Gold Gloves.

Season	Name	Position	Ref.
1972^{AL}	George Scott (1)	First baseman	
1973^{AL}	George Scott (2)	First baseman	
1974^{AL}	George Scott (3)	First baseman	
1975^{AL}	George Scott (4)	First baseman	
1976^{AL}	George Scott (5)	First baseman	
1979^{AL}	Cecil Cooper (1)	First baseman	
1979^{AL}	Sixto Lezcano	Right fielder	
1980^{AL}	Cecil Cooper (2)	First baseman	
1982^{AL}	Robin Yount	Shortstop	
2013^{NL}	Carlos Gómez	Center fielder	
2019^{NL}	Lorenzo Cain	Center fielder	
2024^{NL}	Sal Frelick	Right fielder	
2024^{NL}	Brice Turang (1)	Second baseman	
2026^{NL}	Jackson Chourio	Left fielder	
2026^{NL}	Brice Turang (2)	Second baseman	

=== Wilson Defensive Player of the Year Award ===
Two Brewers have won the Wilson Defensive Player of the Year Award. Carlos Gómez is the only Brewer to win the award twice.

Season	Name	Position	Ref.
2012^{NL}	Carlos Gómez (1)	Center fielder	
2013^{NL}	Carlos Gómez (2)	Center fielder	
2019	Lorenzo Cain	Center fielder	

=== Silver Slugger Award ===
Thirteen Brewers have won the Silver Slugger Award. Cumulatively, the Brewers have won 11 at outfield, 5 at first base, 3 at designated hitter, 2 at shortstop, 1 at pitcher, 1 at utility, and 2 at catcher for a total of 25 Silver Sluggers. Ryan Braun, William Contreras, Cecil Cooper, Prince Fielder, Paul Molitor, Christian Yelich, and Robin Yount are the only Brewers to win the award multiple times.

Season	Name	Position	Ref.
1980^{AL}	Cecil Cooper (1)	First baseman	
1980^{AL}	Ben Oglivie	Left fielder	
1980^{AL}	Robin Yount (1)	Shortstop	
1981^{AL}	Cecil Cooper (2)	First baseman	
1982^{AL}	Cecil Cooper (3)	First baseman	
1982^{AL}	Robin Yount (2)	Shortstop	
1987^{AL}	Paul Molitor (1)	Designated hitter	
1988^{AL}	Paul Molitor (2)	Designated hitter	
1989^{AL}	Robin Yount (3)	Center fielder	
1990^{AL}	Dave Parker	Designated hitter	
2005^{NL}	Carlos Lee	Left fielder	
2007^{NL}	Prince Fielder (1)	First baseman	
2008^{NL}	Ryan Braun (1)	Left fielder	
2009^{NL}	Ryan Braun (2)	Left fielder	
2010^{NL}	Ryan Braun (3)	Left fielder	
2010^{NL}	Yovani Gallardo	Pitcher	
2011^{NL}	Ryan Braun (4)	Left fielder	
2011^{NL}	Prince Fielder (2)	First baseman	
2012^{NL}	Ryan Braun (5)	Left fielder	
2018^{NL}	Christian Yelich (1)	Left fielder	
2019^{NL}	Christian Yelich (2)	Right fielder	
2023^{NL}	William Contreras	Catcher	
2024^{NL}	William Contreras (2)	Catcher	
2026^{NL}	Jake Bauers	Utility player	
2026^{NL}	Jackson Chourio	Left fielder	

=== All-MLB Team ===
Eight Brewers have been named to All-MLB Teams—five to the first team and four to the second team.

Season	Name	Team	Position	Ref.
2019	Josh Hader (1)	First team	Relief pitcher	
2019	Christian Yelich	First team	Outfielder	
2019	Yasmani Grandal	Second team	Catcher	
2020	Devin Williams	Second team	Relief pitcher	
2021	Corbin Burnes	First team	Starting pitcher	
2021	Josh Hader (2)	First team	Relief pitcher	
2024	William Contreras (1)	First team	Catcher	
2025	Freddy Peralta	Second team	Starting pitcher	
2025	Brice Turang (1)	Second team	Second baseman	
2026	Jackson Chourio	First team	Outfielder	
2026	Jacob Misiorowski	First team	Starting pitcher	
2026	Brice Turang (2)	First team	Second baseman	
2026	William Contreras (2)	Second team	Catcher	

=== World Series Most Valuable Player Award ===
One Brewer has won the World Series Most Valuable Player Award.

Season	Name	Position	Ref.
2026	William Contreras	Catcher	

=== League Championship Series Most Valuable Player Award ===
One Brewer has won the League Championship Series Most Valuable Player Award.

Season	Name	Position	Ref.
2026	Jake Bauers	First baseman	

=== Player of the Month Award ===
Eight Brewers have won the Major League Baseball Player of the Month Award. Ryan Braun, Cecil Cooper, Prince Fielder, and Robin Yount are the only Brewers to win the award on multiple occasions.

Month	Name	Position	Ref.
April 1975^{AL}	Robin Yount (1)	Shortstop	
April 1979^{AL}	Cecil Cooper (1)	First baseman	
May 1980^{AL}	Ben Oglivie	Left fielder	
August 1980^{AL}	Cecil Cooper (2)	First baseman	
August 1981^{AL}	Cecil Cooper (3)	First baseman	
July 1982^{AL}	Robin Yount (2)	Shortstop	
July 1983^{AL}	Cecil Cooper (4)	First baseman	
July 1989^{AL}	Robin Yount (3)	Center fielder	
September 1989^{AL}	Paul Molitor	Third baseman	
June 1999^{NL}	Jeromy Burnitz	Right fielder	
May 2007^{NL}	Prince Fielder (1)	First baseman	
July 2007^{NL}	Ryan Braun (1)	Third baseman	
July 2008^{NL}	Ryan Braun (2)	Left fielder	
April 2011^{NL}	Ryan Braun (3)	Left fielder	
June 2011^{NL}	Prince Fielder (2)	First baseman	
September 2011^{NL}	Ryan Braun (4)	Left fielder	
September 2018^{NL}	Christian Yelich	Left fielder	
August 2025^{NL}	Brice Turang	Second baseman	

=== Pitcher of the Month Award ===
Six Brewers have won the Major League Baseball Pitcher of the Month Award. Cal Eldred and CC Sabathia are the only Brewers to win the award twice.

Month	Name	Role	Ref.
September 1992^{AL}	Cal Eldred (1)	Starting pitcher	
June 1994^{AL}	Cal Eldred (2)	Starting pitcher	
July 2000^{NL}	Jeff D'Amico	Starting pitcher	
June 2007^{NL}	Ben Sheets	Starting pitcher	
July 2008^{NL}	CC Sabathia (1)	Starting pitcher	
August 2008^{NL}	CC Sabathia (2)	Starting pitcher	
May 2009^{NL}	Trevor Hoffman	Closing pitcher	
July 2023^{NL}	Corbin Burnes	Starting pitcher	
August 2023^{NL}	Freddy Peralta (1)	Starting pitcher	
August 2025^{NL}	Freddy Peralta (2)	Starting pitcher	

=== Rookie of the Month Award ===
Seven Brewers have won the Major League Baseball Rookie of the Month Award. Ryan Braun is the only Brewer to win the award twice.

Month	Name	Position	Ref.
June 2001^{NL}	Ben Sheets	Pitcher	
August 2003^{NL}	Scott Podsednik	Center fielder	
April 2006^{NL}	Prince Fielder	First baseman	
June 2007^{NL}	Ryan Braun (1)	Third baseman	
July 2007^{NL}	Ryan Braun (2)	Third baseman	
September 2009^{NL}	Casey McGehee	Third baseman	
July 2019^{NL}	Keston Hiura	Second baseman	
May 2024^{NL}	Joey Ortiz	Third baseman	
June 2025^{NL}	Jacob Misiorowski	Starting pitcher	
July 2025^{NL}	Isaac Collins	Outfielder	

=== Ford C. Frick Award ===
One Brewers broadcaster has won the Ford C. Frick Award.

Year	Name	Ref.
2003	Bob Uecker	

== All-Stars ==
Seventy-three Brewers have been selected to play in the Major League Baseball All-Star Game. Twenty-six have been selected on more than one occasion.

Season	Name	Position	Ref.
1969^{AL}	Mike Hegan	Outfielder	
1969^{AL}	Don Mincher	First baseman	
1970^{AL}	Tommy Harper	Third baseman	
1971^{AL}	Marty Pattin	Pitcher	
1972^{AL}	Ellie Rodríguez	Catcher	
1973^{AL}	Jim Colborn	Pitcher	
1973^{AL}	Dave May	Outfielder	
1974^{AL}	Don Money (1)	Third baseman	
1974^{AL}	Darrell Porter	Catcher	
1975^{AL}	Hank Aaron	Designated hitter	
1975^{AL}	George Scott	First baseman	
1976^{AL}	Don Money (2)	Third baseman	
1976^{AL}	Bill Travers	Pitcher	
1977^{AL}	Don Money (3)	Second baseman	
1977^{AL}	Jim Slaton	Pitcher	
1978^{AL}	Larry Hisle	Outfielder	
1978^{AL}	Don Money (4)^{†}	Second baseman	
1978^{AL}	Lary Sorensen	Pitcher	
1979^{AL}	Cecil Cooper (1)	First baseman	
1980^{AL}	Cecil Cooper (2)	First baseman	
1980^{AL}	Paul Molitor (1)	Second baseman	
1980^{AL}	Ben Oglivie (1)^{†}	Outfielder	
1980^{AL}	Robin Yount (1)	Shortstop	
1981^{AL}	Rollie Fingers (1)	Pitcher	
1981^{AL}	Ted Simmons (1)	Catcher	
1981^{AL}	Gorman Thomas	Outfielder	
1982^{AL}	Cecil Cooper (3)^{†}	First baseman	
1982^{AL}	Rollie Fingers (2)	Pitcher	
1982^{AL}	Ben Oglivie (2)	Outfielder	
1982^{AL}	Robin Yount (2)^{†}	Shortstop	
1983^{AL}	Cecil Cooper (4)	First baseman	
1983^{AL}	Ben Oglivie (3)	Outfielder	
1983^{AL}	Ted Simmons (2)^{†}	Catcher	
1983^{AL}	Robin Yount (3)^{†}	Shortstop	
1984^{AL}	Jim Sundberg	Catcher	
1985^{AL}	Cecil Cooper (5)	First baseman	
1985^{AL}	Paul Molitor (2)	Third baseman	
1986^{AL}	Teddy Higuera	Pitcher	
1987^{AL}	Dan Plesac (1)	Pitcher	
1988^{AL}	Paul Molitor (3)^{†}	Second baseman	
1988^{AL}	Dan Plesac (2)	Pitcher	
1989^{AL}	Dan Plesac (3)	Pitcher	
1990^{AL}	Dave Parker	Designated hitter	
1991^{AL}	Paul Molitor (4)	Designated hitter	
1992^{AL}	Paul Molitor (5)	Designated hitter	
1993^{AL}	Greg Vaughn (1)	Outfielder	
1994^{AL}	Ricky Bones	Pitcher	
1995^{AL}	Kevin Seitzer	Third baseman	
1996^{AL}	Greg Vaughn (2)	Outfielder	
1997^{AL}	Jeff Cirillo	Third baseman	
1998^{NL}	Fernando Viña	Second baseman	
1999^{NL}	Jeromy Burnitz^{†}	Outfielder	
1999^{NL}	Dave Nilsson	Catcher	
2000^{NL}	Bob Wickman	Pitcher	
2001^{NL}	Ben Sheets (1)	Pitcher	
2002^{NL}	José Hernández	Shortstop	
2002^{NL}	Richie Sexson (1)	First baseman	
2003^{NL}	Geoff Jenkins	Outfielder	
2003^{NL}	Richie Sexson (2)	First baseman	
2004^{NL}	Dan Kolb	Pitcher	
2004^{NL}	Ben Sheets (2)	Pitcher	
2005^{NL}	Carlos Lee (1)	Outfielder	
2006^{NL}	Chris Capuano	Pitcher	
2006^{NL}	Carlos Lee (2)	Outfielder	
2006^{NL}	Derrick Turnbow	Pitcher	
2007^{NL}	Francisco Cordero	Pitcher	
2007^{NL}	Prince Fielder (1)^{†}	First baseman	
2007^{NL}	J. J. Hardy	Shortstop	
2007^{NL}	Ben Sheets (3)	Pitcher	
2008^{NL}	Ryan Braun (1)^{†}	Outfielder	
2008^{NL}	Corey Hart (1)	Outfielder	
2008^{NL}	Ben Sheets (4)^{†}	Pitcher	
2009^{NL}	Ryan Braun (2)^{†}	Outfielder	
2009^{NL}	Prince Fielder (2)	First baseman	
2009^{NL}	Trevor Hoffman	Pitcher	
2010^{NL}	Ryan Braun (3)^{†}	Outfielder	
2010^{NL}	Yovani Gallardo	Pitcher	
2010^{NL}	Corey Hart (2)^{†}	Outfielder	
2011^{NL}	Ryan Braun (4)	Outfielder	
2011^{NL}	Prince Fielder (3)^{†}	First baseman	
2011^{NL}	Rickie Weeks^{†}	Second baseman	
2012^{NL}	Ryan Braun (5)^{†}	Outfielder	
2013^{NL}	Carlos Gómez (1)	Outfielder	
2013^{NL}	Jean Segura	Shortstop	
2014^{NL}	Carlos Gómez (2)^{†}	Outfielder	
2014^{NL}	Jonathan Lucroy (1)^{†}	Catcher	
2014^{NL}	Aramis Ramírez^{†}	Third baseman	
2014^{NL}	Francisco Rodríguez (1)	Pitcher	
2015^{NL}	Ryan Braun (6)	Outfielder	
2015^{NL}	Francisco Rodríguez (2)	Pitcher	
2016^{NL}	Jonathan Lucroy (2)	Catcher	
2017^{NL}	Corey Knebel	Pitcher	
2018^{NL}	Jesús Aguilar	First baseman	
2018^{NL}	Lorenzo Cain	Outfielder	
2018^{NL}	Josh Hader (1)	Pitcher	
2018^{NL}	Jeremy Jeffress	Pitcher	
2018^{NL}	Christian Yelich (1)	Outfielder	
2019^{NL}	Yasmani Grandal	Catcher	
2019^{NL}	Josh Hader (2)	Pitcher	
2019^{NL}	Mike Moustakas	Third baseman	
2019^{NL}	Brandon Woodruff (1)	Pitcher	
2019^{NL}	Christian Yelich (2)^{†}	Outfielder	
2021^{NL}	Corbin Burnes (2)	Pitcher	
2021^{NL}	Josh Hader (3)	Pitcher	
2021^{NL}	Freddy Peralta (1)	Pitcher	
2021^{NL}	Omar Narváez	Catcher	
2021^{NL}	Brandon Woodruff (2)	Pitcher	
2022^{NL}	Corbin Burnes (2)	Pitcher	
2022^{NL}	Josh Hader (4)	Pitcher	
2022^{NL}	Devin Williams (1)	Pitcher	
2023^{NL}	Corbin Burnes (3)	Pitcher	
2023^{NL}	Devin Williams (2)	Pitcher	
2024^{NL}	William Contreras (1)^{†}	Catcher	
2024^{NL}	Christian Yelich (3)^{†}	Outfielder	
2025^{NL}	Trevor Megill	Pitcher	
2025^{NL}	Jacob Misiorowski (1)	Pitcher	
2025^{NL}	Freddy Peralta (2)	Pitcher	
2026^{NL}	William Contreras (2)	Catcher	
2026^{NL}	Jacob Misiorowski (2)	Pitcher	

=== All-Star Game Most Valuable Player Award ===
One Brewer has won the Major League Baseball All-Star Game Most Valuable Player Award.

Season	Name	Position	Ref.
2011	Prince Fielder	First baseman	

=== Home Run Derby participants ===
Nine Brewers have been selected to participate in the Home Run Derby held during the All-Star break. Prince Fielder and Richie Sexson are the only Brewers to appear in multiple Home Run Derbies. Fielder is the only Brewer to win the contest.

Season	Name	Finish	Total	Ref.
1996	Greg Vaughn	9th (tie)	0	
1999	Jeromy Burnitz	2nd	14	
2002	Richie Sexson (1)	4th	10	
2003	Richie Sexson (2)	7th	1	
2005	Carlos Lee	3rd	15	
2007	Prince Fielder (1)	6th (tie)	3	
2008	Ryan Braun	3rd (tie)	14	
2009	Prince Fielder (2)	1st	23	
2010	Corey Hart	3rd	13	
2011	Prince Fielder (3)	3rd (tie)	9	
2011	Rickie Weeks	7th	3	
2018	Jesús Aguilar	7th	12	

== Minor league system ==
=== Robin Yount Performance Award ===
The Brewers have presented Player and Pitcher of the Year Awards to their top minor leaguers—one player and one pitcher—since 1999. The awards were renamed in honor of Robin Yount in 2003. Jackson Chourio, Taylor Green, Ben Hendrickson, Jesús Made, Carlos Rodríguez and Ben Sheets are the only recipients to win two awards.

==== Player of the Year Award ====
Season	Name	Position	Class(es)	Team(s)	Ref.
1999	Kevin Barker	First baseman	Triple-A	Louisville RiverBats	
2000	Ben Sheets	Pitcher	Triple-A / Double-A	Indianapolis Indians / Huntsville Stars	
2001	Bill Hall	Shortstop	Double-A / Class A-Advanced	Huntsville Stars / High Desert Mavericks	
2002	Brad Nelson	First baseman	Class A-Advanced / Class A	High Desert Mavericks / Beloit Snappers	
2003	Prince Fielder	First baseman	Class A	Beloit Snappers	
2004	Vinny Rottino	Outfielder	Class A	Beloit Snappers	
2005	Nelson Cruz	Outfielder	Triple-A / Double-A	Nashville Sounds / Huntsville Stars	
2006	Ryan Braun	Third baseman	Double-A / Class A-Advanced	Huntsville Stars / Brevard County Manatees	
2007	Taylor Green (1)	Third baseman	Class A	West Virginia Power	
2008	Alcides Escobar	Shortstop	Double-A	Huntsville Stars	
2008	Mat Gamel	Third baseman	Triple-A / Double-A	Nashville Sounds / Huntsville Stars	
2009	Logan Schafer	Outfielder	Double-A / Class A-Advanced	Huntsville Stars / Brevard County Manatees	
2010	Erik Komatsu	Outfielder	Class A-Advanced	Brevard County Manatees	
2011	Taylor Green (2)	Third baseman	Triple-A / Double-A	Nashville Sounds / Huntsville Stars	
2012	Hunter Morris	First baseman	Double-A	Huntsville Stars	
2013	Jason Rogers	First baseman	Double-A	Huntsville Stars	
2014	Clint Coulter	Catcher	Class A	Wisconsin Timber Rattlers	
2015	Orlando Arcia	Shortstop	Double-A	Biloxi Shuckers	
2016	Isan Díaz	Shortstop	Class A	Wisconsin Timber Rattlers	
2017	Lewis Brinson	Outfielder	Triple-A	Colorado Springs Sky Sox	
2018	Corey Ray	Outfielder	Triple-A / Double-A	San Antonio Missions / Biloxi Shuckers	
2019	Trent Grisham	Outfielder	Triple-A / Double-A	San Antonio Missions / Biloxi Shuckers	
2020	None selected				
2021	Joey Wiemer	Outfielder	High-A / Low-A	Wisconsin Timber Rattlers / Carolina Mudcats	
2022	Jackson Chourio (1)	Outfielder	Double-A / High-A / Single-A	Biloxi Shuckers / Wisconsin Timber Rattlers / Carolina Mudcats	
2023	Tyler Black	Third baseman	Triple-A / Double-A	Nashville Sounds / Biloxi Shuckers	
2023	Jackson Chourio (2)	Outfielder	Triple-A / Double-A	Nashville Sounds / Biloxi Shuckers	
2024	Jesús Made (1)	Shortstop	Rookie	DSL Brewers 1	
2024	Cooper Pratt	Shortstop	High-A / Single-A	Wisconsin Timber Rattlers / Carolina Mudcats	
2025	Jesús Made (2)	Shortstop	Double-A / High-A / Single-A	Biloxi Shuckers / Wisconsin Timber Rattlers / Carolina Mudcats	
2026	Andrew Fischer	Third baseman	Double-A / High-A	Biloxi Shuckers / Wisconsin Timber Rattlers	

==== Pitcher of the Year Award ====
Season	Name	Class(es)	Team(s)	Ref.
1999	Allen Levrault	Triple-A / Double-A	Louisville RiverBats / Huntsville Stars	
2000	Ben Sheets	Triple-A / Double-A	Indianapolis Indians / Huntsville Stars	
2001	Nick Neugebauer	Triple-A / Double-A	Indianapolis Indians / Huntsville Stars	
2002	Ben Hendrickson (1)	Double-A / Class A-Advanced	Huntsville Stars / High Desert Mavericks	
2003	Luis Martínez	Triple-A / Double-A	Indianapolis Indians / Huntsville Stars	
2004	Ben Hendrickson (2)	Triple-A	Indianapolis Indians	
2005	Tim Dillard	Class A-Advanced	Brevard County Manatees	
2006	Yovani Gallardo	Double-A / Class A-Advanced	Huntsville Stars / Brevard County Manatees	
2007	Manny Parra	Triple-A / Double-A	Nashville Sounds / Huntsville Stars	
2008	Jeremy Jeffress	Double-A / Class A-Advanced	Huntsville Stars / Brevard County Manatees	
2009	Amaury Rivas	Class A-Advanced	Brevard County Manatees	
2010	Jake Odorizzi	Class A	Wisconsin Timber Rattlers	
2011	Mike Fiers	Triple-A / Double-A	Nashville Sounds / Huntsville Stars	
2012	Hiram Burgos	Triple-A / Double-A / Class A-Advanced	Nashville Sounds / Huntsville Stars / Brevard County Manatees	
2013	Johnny Hellweg	Triple-A	Nashville Sounds	
2014	Jimmy Nelson	Triple-A	Nashville Sounds	
2015	Jorge López	Double-A	Biloxi Shuckers	
2016	Brandon Woodruff	Double-A / Class A-Advanced	Biloxi Shuckers / Brevard County Manatees	
2017	Corbin Burnes	Double-A / Class A-Advanced	Biloxi Shuckers / Carolina Mudcats	
2018	Zack Brown	Double-A	Biloxi Shuckers	
2019	Aaron Ashby	Class A-Advanced / Class A	Carolina Mudcats / Wisconsin Timber Rattlers	
2020	None selected			
2021	Ethan Small	Triple-A / Double-A / Rookie	Nashville Sounds / Biloxi Shuckers / ACL Brewers Gold	
2022	Carlos Rodríguez (1)	High-A	Wisconsin Timber Rattlers	
2023	Robert Gasser	Triple-A	Nashville Sounds	
2023	Carlos Rodríguez (2)	Triple-A / Double-A	Nashville Sounds / Biloxi Shuckers	
2024	K.C. Hunt	Double-A / High-A / Single-A	Biloxi Shuckers / Wisconsin Timber Rattlers / Carolina Mudcats	
2024	Craig Yoho	Triple-A / Double-A / High-A	Nashville Sounds / Biloxi Shuckers / Wisconsin Timber Rattlers	
2025	Tyson Hardin	Double-A / High-A	Biloxi Shuckers / Wisconsin Timber Rattlers	
2026	Josh Knoth	Double-A / High-A / Rookie	Biloxi Shuckers / Wisconsin Timber Rattlers / ACL Brewers	

== Other achievements ==
=== Baseball Hall of Famers ===
Ten Brewers have been inducted in the National Baseball Hall of Fame and Museum.

Year	Name	Brewers career	Position	Ref.
1982	Hank Aaron	1975–1976	Designated hitter	
1992	Rollie Fingers	1981–1982, 1984–1985	Pitcher	
1998	Don Sutton	1982–1984	Pitcher	
1999	Robin Yount	1974–1993	Shortstop	
2004	Paul Molitor	1978–1992	Third baseman	
2017	Bud Selig	1970–1998	Owner	
2018	Trevor Hoffman	2009–2010	Pitcher	
2020	Ted Simmons	1981–1985	Catcher	
2025	Dave Parker	1990	Designated hitter	
2025	CC Sabathia	2008	Pitcher	

=== Retired numbers ===
The Brewers have retired five uniform numbers in honor of its former players and executives. This ensures that the number will be associated with one person of particular importance to the team. Additionally, the number 42 has been retired throughout professional baseball in honor of Jackie Robinson.

No.	Name	Seasons	Position	Ref.
1	Bud Selig	1970–1998	Owner	
4	Paul Molitor	1978–1992	Third baseman	
19	Robin Yount	1974–1993	Shortstop	
34	Rollie Fingers	1981–1982, 1984–1985	Pitcher	
42	Jackie Robinson	—	Second baseman	
44	Hank Aaron	1975–1976	Designated hitter	

=== Milwaukee Brewers Wall of Honor ===
The Milwaukee Brewers Wall of Honor at American Family Field is an exhibit that commemorates players, coaches, executives, and broadcasters who have made significant contributions to the team and meet set criteria regarding career milestones or service time.

=== American Family Field Walk of Fame ===
The American Family Field Walk of Fame at American Family Field is an exhibit that commemorates players, coaches, executives, and broadcasters who have made significant contributions to Major League Baseball in Milwaukee. It covers the entire history of the Brewers since 1970 and that of the Milwaukee Braves, who played in the city from 1953 to 1965.

== See also ==
- Baseball awards
- List of Major League Baseball awards
- Wisconsin Athletic Hall of Fame
