= Andy Dillard =

American baseball player (born 1981)

Andy Dillard (born August 4, 1981 in Saltillo, Mississippi) is a former college baseball All-American, professional player and current coach.

Dillard attended Saltillo High School and Itawamba Community College before attending Delta State University, where he earned NCAA Division II All-American honors in 2002. He also earned Player of the Week honors from Collegiate Baseball Newspaper at one point early in that campaign and also earned the American Baseball Coaches Association/Rawlings South Central Region's Player of the Year honor, First-Team All-Gulf South Conference recognition and the Gulf South Conference Player of the Year award. He hit .433 with 154 total bases and 13 home runs that season. In 2003, he helped lead Delta State to the Gulf South Conference baseball title and was named to the All-GSC Tournament team.

The third baseman later played professionally for the Nashua Pride in the independent Canadian-American League in 2006 and 2007. In 2006, he hit .283 with five home runs and 33 RBI in 78 games and was selected to start for the Canadian-American League All-Star team. In 2007, he hit .190 with two home runs and eight RBI in 12 games. He currently coaches the Tallahatchie Rascals in the Cotton States Baseball League. He has won 1 Cotton States league title.

His father, Steve Dillard, played in the major leagues from 1975 to 1982 and his brother, Tim Dillard, pitched in the major leagues from 2008 to 2012. Another brother, Jeff Dillard, played in independent baseball in 2000.
