= Christian Yelich =

American baseball player (born 1991)

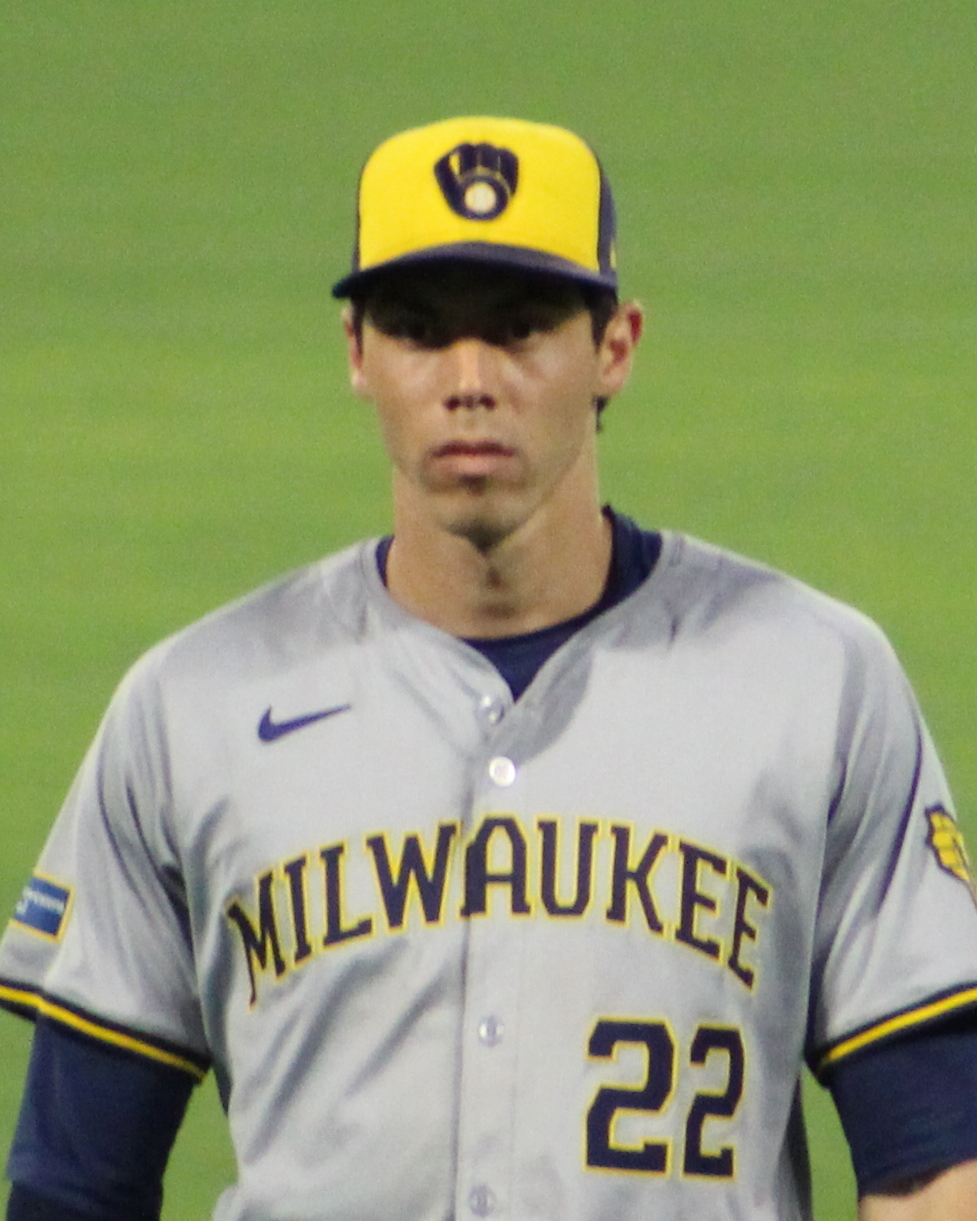
- Yelich with the Milwaukee Brewers in 2024

Milwaukee Brewers – No. 22
- Left fielder / Designated hitter
- Born: December 5, 1991 (age 34); Thousand Oaks, California, U.S.
- Bats: Left Throws: Right

MLB debut
- July 23, 2013, for the Miami Marlins

MLB statistics (through 2026 season)
- Batting average: .282
- Hits: 1,845
- Home runs: 245
- Runs batted in: 910
- Stolen bases: 232
- Stats at Baseball Reference

Teams
- Miami Marlins (2013–2017); Milwaukee Brewers (2018–present)

Career highlights and awards
- MLB: 3× All-Star (2018, 2019, 2024); World Series champion (2026); NL MVP (2018); All-MLB First Team (2019); Gold Glove Award (2014); 3× Silver Slugger Award (2016, 2018, 2019); 2× NL Hank Aaron Award (2018, 2019); 2× NL batting champion (2018, 2019); International: All-World Baseball Classic Team (2017)
Medals
Men's baseball
Representing United States
World Baseball Classic
Gold medal – first place	2017 Los Angeles	Team

Christian Stephen Yelich (born December 5, 1991) is an American professional baseball left fielder and designated hitter who captains the Milwaukee Brewers of Major League Baseball (MLB). He has previously played in MLB for the Miami Marlins. Internationally, Yelich represents the United States. In the 2017 World Baseball Classic (WBC), he helped win Team USA's first gold medal in a WBC tournament and was named to the All-World Baseball Classic Team.

The Marlins selected Yelich in the first round of the 2010 MLB draft. He made his MLB debut for the Marlins in 2013 and was traded to the Brewers in the 2017–18 offseason. Yelich is a three-time MLB All-Star, a three-time Silver Slugger Award winner, a two-time National League batting champion, a Gold Glove Award recipient in 2014, and the winner of the National League's 2018 Most Valuable Player Award. In 2026, less than a month after being named the first captain in Brewers history, he led Milwaukee to their first World Series championship.

Yelich hit for the cycle twice in 2018 and once in 2022, becoming the sixth player in MLB history to hit for the cycle three times, and the only one with three against the same team.

== Career ==
=== Amateur career ===
Yelich was born in Thousand Oaks, California, and attended Westlake High School. During his freshman year, he batted .373 with 25 hits and 16 strikeouts in 67 at bats. In his sophomore year, he batted .341 with 31 hits and 24 strikeouts in 91 at bats During Yelich's junior year, he batted .489 with 46 hits and struck out six times. In his senior year, he batted .451 with 37 hits, nine strikeouts and nine home runs in 82 at bats. He was named Second Team All-American by Max Preps and was ranked 34 among the top 100 players in the nation in high school.

Yelich accepted a scholarship to play college baseball for the Miami Hurricanes baseball team.

=== Professional career ===
==== Miami Marlins ====
The Miami Marlins selected Yelich in the first round, with the 23rd overall selection, in the 2010 MLB draft. Yelich and the Marlins agreed to a $1.7 million signing bonus on August 17, shortly before the deadline to sign 2010 draftees was about to pass. Yelich played for the Gulf Coast League Marlins for six games, getting nine hits and seven strikeouts with a batting average of .375 before being advanced to Class-A. He played in six games for the Greensboro Grasshoppers in 2010, batting .348. In 2011, he batted .261 with 43 hits, six strikeouts, and four home runs. Yelich was named the Marlins' Minor League Player of the Year in both 2011 and 2012.

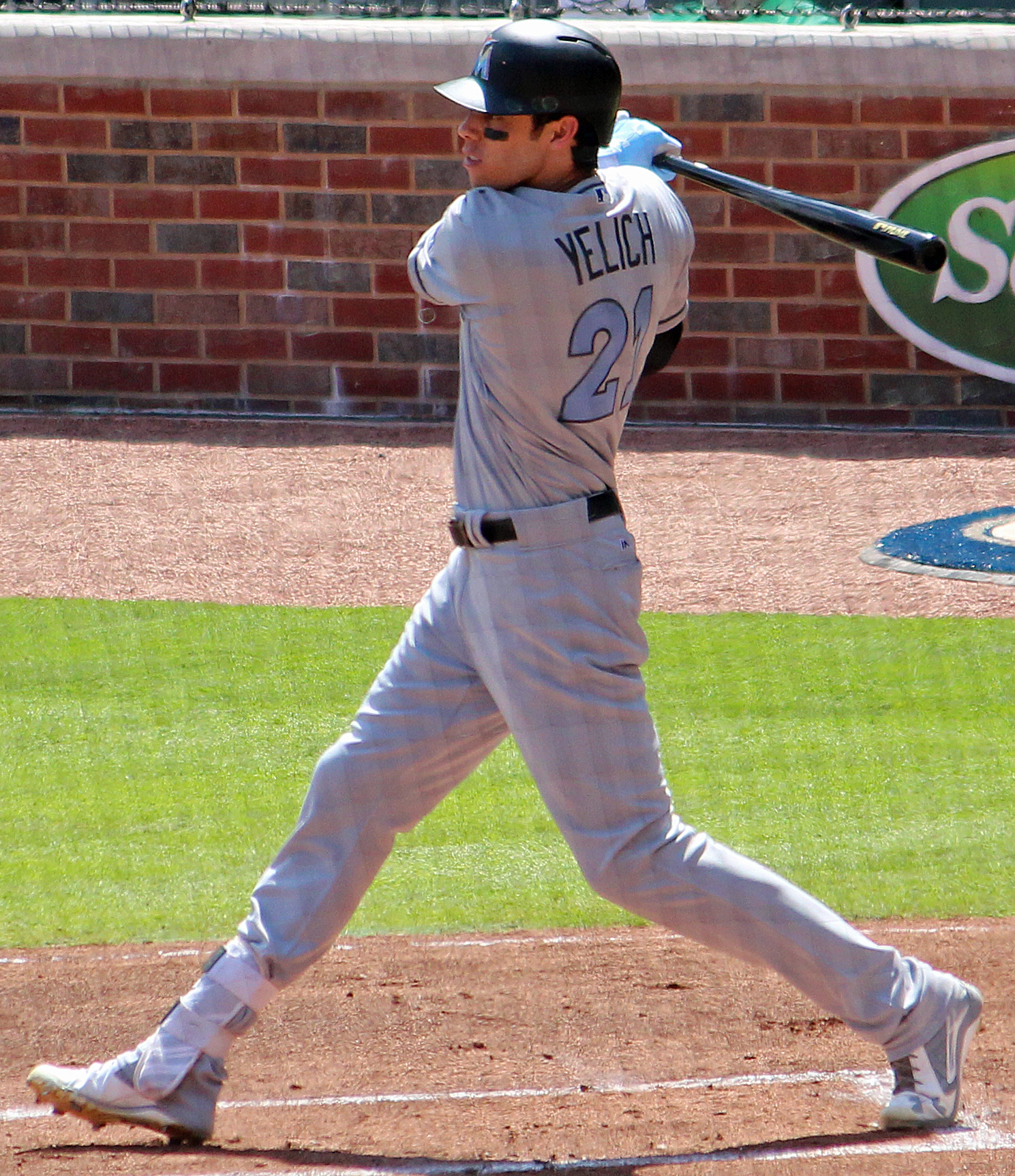
Yelich with the Marlins in 2017

On July 23, 2013, the Marlins promoted Yelich to MLB from the Double-A Jacksonville Suns.

In the 2014 season, Yelich batted .284 with 21 steals out of the leadoff spot for the Miami Marlins. He also won a Gold Glove Award in left field, becoming the franchise's youngest ever player and first outfielder to win the award. During the season, Yelich set a franchise record for fielding percentage in left field, at .996. He served as the final out of Jordan Zimmermann's no-hitter on September 28, 2014, when Steven Souza Jr. made a diving play to save the no hitter.

Yelich and the Marlins finalized a seven-year, $49.57 million contract extension on March 22, 2015. He struggled to start the season, and was placed on the disabled list in April with lower back strain before making his return on May 8. His batting average reached a season low of .178 on May 22. In August, Yelich bruised his right knee and was again placed on the disabled list. Yelich had improved from his earlier offensive struggles and was hitting .275/.343/.376 with six home runs, 29 RBIs and 14 stolen bases up to that point in the season. Despite aggravating the injury shortly after his return, Yelich remained an active player for the quality of his bat. Near the end of the season, Yelich shared the field with Marcell Ozuna, the outfielder who had replaced him during his second stint on the disabled list. Yelich closed the 2015 season with a .300 average. For the season, he had the highest ground ball percentage (62.5%), and the lowest fly ball percentage (15.0%), of all major league hitters.

Yelich was projected to bat third to start 2016. He hit well in that spot, and managed to increase his power output. On April 23, in a game against the San Francisco Giants, Yelich hit three doubles, which tied a franchise record. Defensively, Yelich was a starting outfielder, alongside Ozuna and Giancarlo Stanton. In late May, Yelich missed some time due to back spasms. After Stanton was placed on the disabled list, Ozuna played Stanton's usual position in right field, while Yelich took Ozuna's spot in center on days that backup outfielder Ichiro Suzuki was unavailable.

==== Milwaukee Brewers ====
On January 25, 2018, the Marlins traded Yelich to the Milwaukee Brewers for prospects Lewis Brinson, Isan Díaz, Monte Harrison, and Jordan Yamamoto. Brinson was seen as the Brewers' top prospect, and another two had appeared on lists ranking the Brewers' top ten. While the Brewers' analytics department was concerned that the prospects would go on to outproduce Yelich, the team's owner Mark Attanasio decided to proceed with the deal on the assumption that Yelich would provide value beyond his on-field numbers. "We felt that a team like ours didn't get to see a player of that quality often," he later told The Wall Street Journal.

Yelich was named to the 2018 MLB All-Star Game after batting .285 with 11 home runs, 36 RBIs, and 11 stolen bases. Yelich, a reserve for the National League, replaced Matt Kemp in left field and went 1-for-3, hitting a solo home run in an 8–6 extra-inning loss to the American League. On August 29, Yelich hit for the cycle against the Cincinnati Reds, collecting a total of six hits in the game. On September 2, Yelich hit his first career grand slam, in a game against the Washington Nationals. On September 17, Yelich hit for the cycle, also against the Reds, for the second time in 19 days, becoming the fifth player in MLB history to hit two cycles in the same season and the first player in MLB history to do so against the same team.

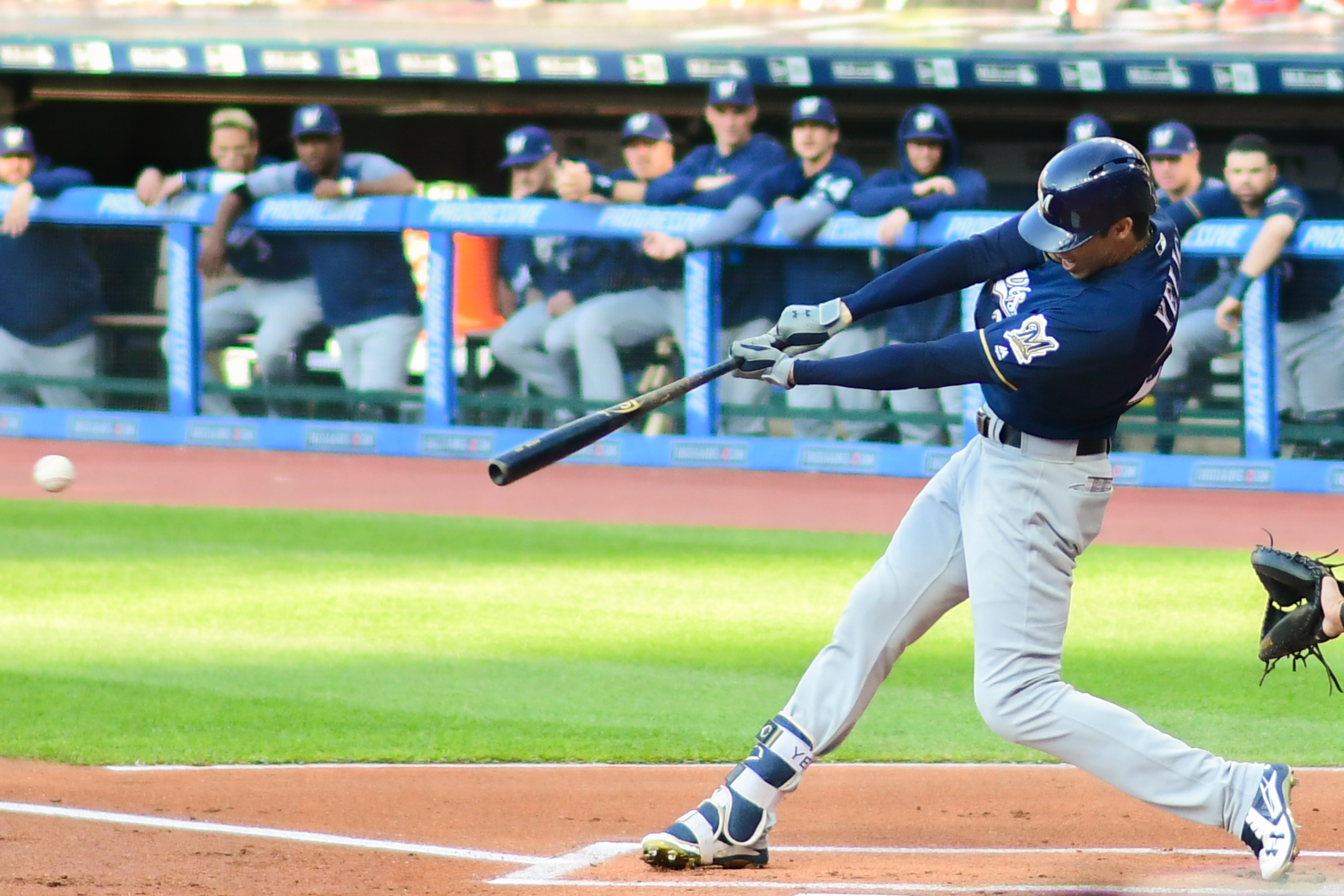
Yelich batting during his MVP season in 2018

Yelich finished the 2018 season with a .326/.402/.598 slash line, 36 homers, and 110 RBIs, winning the first NL batting title in Brewers history, while narrowly falling short of a triple crown. He also was second in the league in power-speed number (27.3). On October 26, Yelich was announced as the National League recipient of the annual Hank Aaron Award. On November 16, Yelich was named Most Valuable Player of the National League, falling one vote shy of a unanimous selection.

On March 31, 2019, Yelich became the sixth player in MLB history to hit a home run in each of his team's first four games.

On July 1, 2019, Yelich became the first player in Brewers franchise history to reach 30 home runs before the All-Star Break, beating former Brewer Prince Fielder's record of 29 home runs. Yelich was selected to participate in the Home Run Derby but had to withdraw due to a back injury. He was replaced by Matt Chapman in the Home Run Derby. On September 10, 2019, Yelich hit a foul ball off his kneecap and consequently left the game. Shortly thereafter, it was revealed that his right kneecap was fractured, which prematurely ended his 2019 season.

Yelich sliding into second in 2018, one of his five career seasons with 20+ stolen bases

In 2019, Yelich won his second National League batting title. He batted .329/.429 (leading the NL)/.671 (leading the major leagues) with a 1.100 OPS (leading the majors), 44 home runs (4th in the NL), 11.1 at bats per home runs (leading the league), a .342 ISO (leading the NL), 30 stolen bases (3rd), a 93.75 stolen base percentage (3rd), and 97 RBIs in 130 games. He had the highest Hard Contact Percentage of all National League batters, at 50.8%. Yelich was the first National League player to lead the league in batting average and slugging percentage in consecutive seasons since Rogers Hornsby, who did so from 1920 to 1925. He won the NL Hank Aaron Award for the second year in a row and finished second in NL MVP voting.

After the 2019 season, Yelich became the only player in Major League Baseball history to have consecutive seasons hitting .325 or higher with 35 or more homers and 20 or more steals.

On March 6, 2020, Yelich signed a nine-year, $215 million contract extension with the Brewers, more than doubling Ryan Braun's previous record of $105 million for the richest contract in franchise history. In the shortened 60-game 2020 season, he hit .205/.356/.430 with 12 home runs.

At the start of the 2021 season, Yelich had a lingering back problem that caused him to spend over half of April and the first few weeks of May on the injured list.

Yelich hit his third career cycle on May 11, 2022, becoming the sixth player in MLB history to do so, and the first player to accomplish three cycles against the same team, the Cincinnati Reds.

In 2022, he had the highest ground ball percentage of all major leaguers (58.6%), the lowest fly ball percentage (23.0%), and batted .252/.355/.383. In the 2023 season, he batted .278 and had 19 home runs and 76 RBI in 144 games.

In the 2024 season, Yelich's season stats as of early July had nearly matched the weighted runs created plus (wRC+) he achieved in his MVP and near-MVP seasons of 2018 and 2019. However, he was placed on the injured list with a back issue on July 24. Despite Yelich's attempt to put off a back surgery until after the season, he and the team announced on August 15 that he would be entering surgery the next day with the hope of returning in 2025. On September 8, the team officially ended Yelich's season by transferring him to the 60-day injured list.

On May 5, 2025, Yelich played his 1,500th career game against the Houston Astros, where he went 1–for–3 in the game with a solo home run, two RBIs, a stolen base, and walked once. With that milestone, he becomes the 730th player to reach that milestone. On May 27, Yelich hit a grand slam walk-off home run in the bottom of the 10th inning to beat the Boston Red Sox 5-1. It was his first career walk-off home run. On May 30 against the Philadelphia Phillies, Yelich notched his 12th multi-homer game as a Brewer. He tied Milwaukee legends Richie Sexson and Rob Deer for 9th-most in franchise history. On June 2, Yelich was named the National League Player of the Week for May 26-June 1, a span in which he batted .500 (10–20) with 5 Runs, 3 home runs, 9 RBI, and an OPS of 1.545. This is the sixth time that Yelich has won a Player of the Week award, but the first since April 2019. Yelich also had an on base streak of 30 consecutive games, from June 15 to July 25. On July 28, against the Chicago Cubs, Yelich hit his 20th home run of the season, which made 2025 his first season since 2019 where he'd hit at least 20 home runs in a season. In the 2025 season, he batted .264 with 29 home runs and 103 RBI.

Yelich wearing the captain's "C" during the 2026 NLCS

On April 12 he suffered a right adductor strain while running the bases, and he returned to the Brewers lineup one month later on May 12. Across After the Brewers secured their eighth playoff berth in Yelich's nine seasons with the team,118 games of the 2026 season, he batted .235 with 12 home runs and 59 RBI.

Yelich during the 2026 World Series victory parade

In 2026, after the Brewers secured their eighth playoff berth in Yelich's nine seasons with the team, Yelich was named the franchise's first-ever team captain on Sept. 26, 2026. Across 12 games of the 2026 postseason, Yelich batted .268 with 11 hits, six runs scored, five RBI, and four stolen bases. This included a crucial RBI triple and then scoring in the first game of the 2026 World Series over the Tampa Bay Rays, scoring and recording an RBI in the 10-1 game three, and then scoring the third run of the decisive game five — which ended 4-1 and secured the first World Series championship in Brewers franchise history on Oct. 28, 2026.

=== International career ===
Yelich played for Team USA in the 2017 World Baseball Classic. He appeared in eight games during the tournament, posting a .310 batting average with four doubles and a .823 OPS. Team USA defeated Puerto Rico in the championship game, securing their first World Baseball Classic title. After the tournament, he was named to the All-World Baseball Classic team.

On September 10, 2018, he was selected to play with the MLB All-Stars at the 2018 MLB Japan All-Star Series, but he later withdrew from the event.

== Personal life ==
Yelich is the eldest child of Stephen and Alecia Yelich, and the great-grandson of American football player Fred Gehrke, who played for the Los Angeles Rams and the San Francisco 49ers. His uncle, Chris Yelich, played for the UCLA Bruins. He has two brothers: Collin, who played minor league baseball in the Braves organization, and Cameron, who is a member of the United States Marine Corps.

As of 2025 and 2026, Yelich is in a relationship with professional soccer player Paige Almendariz.

Yelich's paternal great-grandfather was a Serb from Trebinje, Bosnia and Herzegovina. Yelich was baptized in the Serbian Orthodox Church as Risto Šćepan Jelić (Serbian Cyrillic: Ристо Шћепан Јелић). His maternal grandfather was Japanese.

Yelich appeared as himself in an episode of Magnum P.I. that aired on March 4, 2019. In his scene, he plays with the 2018 Honolulu Little League World Champions and homers off series protagonist Orville "Rick" Wright (played by Zachary Knighton).

Yelich grew up as a fan of the Los Angeles Dodgers and New York Yankees.

Yelich owns property in Malibu, California. In October 2021, he purchased a $6.5 million home in Paradise Valley, Arizona, from NHL player Oliver Ekman-Larsson.

In 2026, The Players Trust, the MLB Players Association's charitable arm, named Yelich its "Most Valuable Philanthropist." The award recognized Yelich's fundraising efforts through the annual Home Plate Charity Concert. Among the causes Yelich has supported are animal sanctuaries, college scholarships, and Milwaukee-focused nonprofits.

== See also ==
- List of Major League Baseball single-game hits leaders
- List of Major League Baseball players to hit for the cycle
- List of Major League Baseball career home run leaders
- List of Major League Baseball career runs scored leaders
- List of Milwaukee Brewers award winners and All-Stars
- Miami Marlins award winners and league leaders

Awards and achievements
Preceded by Mookie Betts; Self; Eddie Rosario	Hitting for the cycle August 29, 2018; September 17, 2018; May 11, 2022	Succeeded by Self; Charlie Blackmon; Eduardo Escobar
Preceded by Cody Bellinger	National League Player of the Month; September 2018	Succeeded by Justin Turner
