= 2023 Milwaukee Brewers season =

2023 Milwaukee Brewers
- National League Central champions
- League: National League
- Division: Central
- Ballpark: American Family Field
- City: Milwaukee, Wisconsin
- Record: 92–70 (.568)
- Divisional place: 1st
- Owners: Mark Attanasio
- General managers: Matt Arnold
- Managers: Craig Counsell
- Television: Bally Sports Wisconsin (Brian Anderson, Bill Schroeder, Jeff Levering) Telemundo Wisconsin (Spanish-language coverage, Sunday home games; Jaime Cano, Kevin Holden)
- Radio: 620 WTMJ; Milwaukee Brewers Radio Network (Bob Uecker, Jeff Levering, Lane Grindle, Josh Maurer)
- Stats: ESPN.com; Baseball Reference

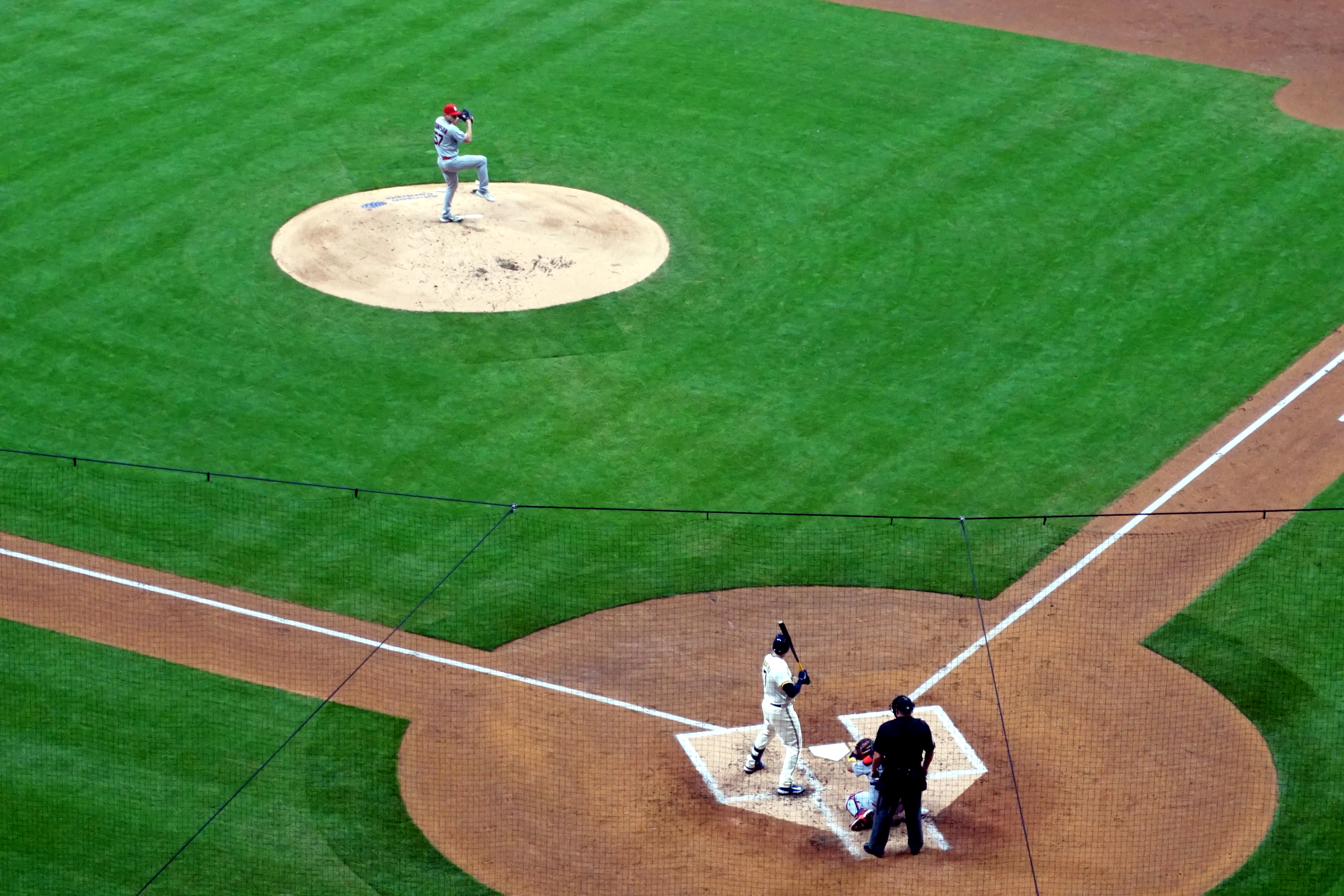
The Brewers in action against St. Louis on September 27

The 2023 Milwaukee Brewers season was the 54th season for the Brewers in Milwaukee, their 26th in the National League, and their 55th overall.

On August 24, 2022, MLB announced the 2023 season schedule.

On September 22, 2023, the Brewers clinched a playoff spot for the fifth time in six seasons following a 16–1 win over the Miami Marlins. Despite losing on September 26 to the Cardinals, the Brewers clinched the National League Central due to the Chicago Cubs losing 7–6 to the Atlanta Braves. They lost to the Arizona Diamondbacks in the National League Wild Card Series, their fourth consecutive playoff appearance without a series win.

The Brewers drew an average home attendance of 31,497 in 81 home games in the 2023 MLB season.

== Spring training ==
The Brewers finished spring training with a record of 12–15 (2 ties).

== Season standings ==
=== National League Central ===
NL Central
Team	W	L	Pct.	GB	Home	Road
Milwaukee Brewers	92	70	.568	—	49‍–‍32	43‍–‍38
Chicago Cubs	83	79	.512	9	45‍–‍36	38‍–‍43
Cincinnati Reds	82	80	.506	10	38‍–‍43	44‍–‍37
Pittsburgh Pirates	76	86	.469	16	39‍–‍42	37‍–‍44
St. Louis Cardinals	71	91	.438	21	35‍–‍46	36‍–‍45

=== National League wild card ===
Division leaders
Team	W	L	Pct.
Atlanta Braves	104	58	.642
Los Angeles Dodgers	100	62	.617
Milwaukee Brewers	92	70	.568

Wild Card teams (Top 3 teams qualify for postseason)
Team	W	L	Pct.	GB
Philadelphia Phillies	90	72	.556	+6
Miami Marlins	84	78	.519	—
Arizona Diamondbacks	84	78	.519	—
Chicago Cubs	83	79	.512	1
San Diego Padres	82	80	.506	2
Cincinnati Reds	82	80	.506	2
San Francisco Giants	79	83	.488	5
Pittsburgh Pirates	76	86	.469	8
New York Mets	75	87	.463	9
St. Louis Cardinals	71	91	.438	13
Washington Nationals	71	91	.438	13
Colorado Rockies	59	103	.364	25

=== Record vs. opponents ===
==== Record vs. National League ====
2023 National League record Source: MLB Standings Grid – 2023
Team	AZ	ATL	CHC	CIN	COL	LAD	MIA	MIL	NYM	PHI	PIT	SD	SF	STL	WSH	AL
Arizona	—	3–3	6–1	3–4	10–3	5–8	2–4	4–2	1–6	3–4	4–2	7–6	7–6	3–3	5–1	21–25
Atlanta	3–3	—	4–2	5–1	7–0	4–3	9–4	5–1	10–3	8–5	4–3	3–4	4–2	4–2	8–5	26–20
Chicago	1–6	2–4	—	6–7	4–2	3–4	2–4	6–7	3–3	1–5	10–3	4–3	5–1	8–5	3–4	25–21
Cincinnati	4–3	1–5	7–6	—	4–2	4–2	3–3	3–10	4–2	3–4	5–8	3–3	3–4	6–7	4–3	28–18
Colorado	3–10	0–7	2–4	2–4	—	3–10	5–2	4–2	4–2	2–5	2–4	4–9	4–9	3–3	3–4	18–28
Los Angeles	8–5	3–4	4–3	2–4	10–3	—	3–3	5–1	3–3	4–2	4–3	9–4	7–6	4–3	4–2	30–16
Miami	4–2	4–9	4–2	3–3	2–5	3–3	—	3–4	4–8	7–6	5–2	2–4	3–3	3–4	11–2	26–20
Milwaukee	2–4	1–5	7–6	10–3	2–4	1–5	4–3	—	6–1	4–2	8–5	6–1	2–5	8–5	3–3	28–18
New York	6–1	3–10	3–3	2–4	2–4	3–3	8–4	1–6	—	6–7	3–3	3–3	4–3	4–3	7–6	19–27
Philadelphia	4–3	5–8	5–1	4–3	5–2	2–4	6–7	2–4	7–6	—	3–3	5–2	2–4	5–1	7–6	28–18
Pittsburgh	2–4	3–4	3–10	8–5	4–2	3–4	2–5	5–8	3–3	3–3	—	5–1	2–4	9–4	5–2	19–27
San Diego	6–7	4–3	3–4	3–3	9–4	4–9	4–2	1–6	3–3	2–5	1–5	—	8–5	3–3	3–3	28–18
San Francisco	6–7	2–4	1–5	4–3	9–4	6–7	3–3	5–2	3–4	4–2	4–2	5–8	—	6–1	1–5	20–26
St. Louis	3–3	2–4	5–8	7–6	3–3	3–4	4–3	5–8	3–4	1–5	4–9	3–3	1–6	—	4–2	23–23
Washington	1–5	5–8	4–3	3–4	4–3	2–4	2–11	3–3	6–7	6–7	2–5	3–3	5–1	2–4	—	23–23

Updated with the results of all games through October 1, 2023.

==== Record vs. American League ====
2023 National League record vs. American League Source: MLB Standings
Team	BAL	BOS	CWS	CLE	DET	HOU	KC	LAA	MIN	NYY	OAK	SEA	TB	TEX	TOR
Arizona	1–2	1–2	2–1	2–1	3–0	0–3	2–1	2–1	0–3	1–2	2–1	1–2	1–2	3–1	0–3
Atlanta	2–1	1–3	1–2	2–1	2–1	0–3	3–0	2–1	3–0	3–0	1–2	2–1	2–1	2–1	0–3
Chicago	2–1	1–2	3–1	1–2	2–1	0–3	2–1	0–3	1–2	2–1	3–0	2–1	2–1	2–1	2–1
Cincinnati	2–1	2–1	1–2	2–2	2–1	3–0	3–0	3–0	1–2	0–3	2–1	2–1	1–2	3–0	1–2
Colorado	1–2	2–1	2–1	2–1	1–2	1–3	2–1	2–1	1–2	2–1	1–2	0–3	0–3	0–3	1–2
Los Angeles	2–1	2–1	2–1	2–1	2–1	2–1	1–2	4–0	2–1	1–2	3–0	3–0	1–2	2–1	1–2
Miami	0–3	3–0	2–1	2–1	2–1	1–2	3–0	3–0	2–1	2–1	3–0	1–2	1–3	0–3	1–2
Milwaukee	2–1	1–2	3–0	2–1	1–2	2–1	3–0	2–1	2–2	2–1	0–3	3–0	1–2	3–0	1–2
New York	0–3	1–2	2–1	3–0	0–3	1–2	0–3	1–2	1–2	2–2	3–0	2–1	2–1	1–2	0–3
Philadelphia	2–1	1–2	2–1	1–2	3–0	2–1	2–1	2–1	1–2	1–2	3–0	2–1	3–0	0–3	3–1
Pittsburgh	1–2	3–0	2–1	1–2	2–2	1–2	3–0	1–2	1–2	1–2	1–2	1–2	0–3	1–2	0–3
San Diego	2–1	1–2	3–0	2–1	2–1	1–2	1–2	3–0	1–2	1–2	3–0	1–3	2–1	3–0	2–1
San Francisco	1–2	2–1	2–1	2–1	0–3	2–1	1–2	1–2	2–1	1–2	2–2	1–2	1–2	1–2	1–2
St. Louis	2–1	3–0	2–1	1–2	1–2	1–2	2–2	0–3	1–2	2–1	2–1	1–2	2–1	1–2	2–1
Washington	0–4	2–1	2–1	1–2	2–1	1–2	2–1	1–2	2–1	2–1	3–0	2–1	0–3	2–1	1–2

Updated with the results of all games through October 1, 2023.

== Roster ==
2023 Milwaukee Brewers
Roster
Pitchers: 47 Clayton Andrews; 57 Caleb Boushley; 36,50 J. B. Bukauskas; 39 Corbin Burnes; 21 Matt Bush; 32 Andrew Chafin; 58 Alex Claudio; 54 Jake Cousins; 12 Javy Guerra; 37 Adrian Houser; 56 Janson Junk; 52 Eric Lauer; 29 Trevor Megill; 36 J. C. Mejía; 20 Wade Miley; 50 Tyson Miller; 55 Hoby Milner; 45 Thomas Pannone; 31 Joel Payamps; 59 Elvis Peguero; 51 Freddy Peralta; 48 Colin Rea; 43 Ethan Small; 57 Bennett Sousa; 32 Peter Strzelecki; 49 Julio Teherán; 45 Abner Uribe; 47 Gus Varland; 54 Thyago Vieira; 38 Devin Williams; 46 Bryse Wilson; 53 Brandon Woodruff	Catchers: 7 Víctor Caratini; 24 William Contreras; Infielders: 27 Willy Adames; 9 Brian Anderson; 10 Mike Brosseau; 3 Josh Donaldson; 12 Jahmai Jones; 6 Owen Miller; 14 Andruw Monasterio; 25 Darin Ruf; 41 Carlos Santana; 12 Jon Singleton; 11 Rowdy Tellez; 13 Abraham Toro; 0,2 Brice Turang; 2 Luis Urías; 45 Luke Voit	Outfielders: 21 Mark Canha; 10 Sal Frelick; 5 Garrett Mitchell; 16 Blake Perkins; 3 Raimel Tapia; 15 Tyrone Taylor; 28 Joey Wiemer; 33 Jesse Winker; 22 Christian Yelich	Manager: 30 Craig Counsell; Coaches: 23 Quintin Berry (first base); 65 Néstor Corredor (coach); 70 Connor Dawson (hitting); 95 Daniel de Mondesert (bullpen catcher); 61 Jim Henderson (bullpen); 84 Chris Hook (pitching); 40 Jason Lane (third base); 60 Walker McKinven (associate pitching, catching, strategy); 00 Pat Murphy (bench); 99 Ozzie Timmons (hitting); 62 Adam Weisenburger (bullpen catcher)|-

== Player statistics ==
= Indicates team leader

=== Batting ===
Note: G = Games played; AB = At bats; R = Runs; H = Hits; 2B = Doubles; 3B = Triples; HR = Home runs; RBI = Runs batted in; SB = Stolen bases; BB = Walks; AVG = Batting average; SLG = Slugging average

Player	G	AB	R	H	2B	3B	HR	RBI	SB	BB	AVG	SLG
Willy Adames	149	553	73	120	29	2	24	80	5	71	.217	.407
Christian Yelich	144	550	106	153	34	1	19	76	28	78	.278	.447
William Contreras	141	540	86	156	38	1	17	78	6	63	.289	.457
Brice Turang	137	404	46	88	9	3	6	34	26	38	.218	.300
Joey Wiemer	132	367	48	75	19	0	13	42	11	36	.204	.362
Brian Anderson	96	318	38	72	12	3	9	40	1	36	.226	.368
Rowdy Tellez	105	311	26	67	9	1	13	47	0	35	.215	.376
Owen Miller	90	291	29	76	17	0	5	27	13	17	.261	.371
Andruw Monasterio	92	282	38	73	14	1	3	27	7	28	.259	.348
Tyrone Taylor	81	231	36	54	17	1	10	35	9	8	.234	.446
Carlos Santana	52	205	33	51	8	1	11	33	0	20	.249	.459
Victor Caratini	62	201	23	52	4	0	7	25	1	19	.259	.383
Sal Frelick	57	191	29	47	9	1	3	24	7	28	.246	.351
Mark Canha	50	178	23	51	10	0	5	33	4	17	.287	.427
Jesse Winker	61	166	16	33	5	0	1	23	0	26	.199	.247
Blake Perkins	67	143	28	31	7	0	4	20	5	23	.217	.350
Mike Brosseau	29	73	4	15	2	0	4	8	0	4	.205	.397
Luke Voit	22	68	5	15	3	0	0	4	2	4	.221	.265
Garrett Mitchell	19	65	10	16	2	1	3	7	1	7	.246	.446
Josh Donaldson	17	59	5	10	4	0	3	11	0	10	.169	.390
Luis Urías	20	55	5	8	2	0	1	5	0	7	.145	.236
Raimel Tapia	20	52	10	9	0	0	2	3	2	6	.173	.288
Jon Singleton	11	29	3	3	1	0	0	2	0	3	.103	.138
Darin Ruf	11	26	2	5	1	0	0	0	0	4	.192	.231
Abraham Toro	9	18	4	8	0	0	2	9	0	2	.444	.778
Jahmai Jones	7	10	2	2	1	0	0	3	1	1	.200	.300
Totals	162	5386	728	1290	257	16	165	696	129	591	.240	.385
Rank in NL	—	14	8	13	13	12	12	9	7	3	12	14

Source:Baseball Reference

=== Pitching ===
Note: W = Wins; L = Losses; ERA = Earned run average; G = Games pitched; GS = Games started; SV = Saves; IP = Innings pitched; H = Hits allowed; R = Runs allowed; ER = Earned runs allowed; BB = Walks allowed; SO = Strikeouts

Player	W	L	ERA	G	GS	SV	IP	H	R	ER	BB	SO
Corbin Burnes	10	8	3.39	32	32	0	193.2	141	77	73	66	200
Freddy Peralta	12	10	3.86	30	30	0	165.2	131	77	71	54	210
Colin Rea	6	6	4.55	26	22	0	124.2	110	65	63	38	110
Wade Miley	9	4	3.14	23	23	0	120.1	99	44	42	38	79
Adrian Houser	8	5	4.12	23	21	0	111.1	121	56	51	34	96
Bryse Wilson	6	0	2.58	53	0	3	76.2	60	26	22	22	61
Julio Teherán	3	5	4.40	14	11	0	71.2	68	36	35	13	50
Joel Payamps	7	5	2.55	69	0	3	70.2	57	24	20	17	77
Brandon Woodruff	5	1	2.28	11	11	0	67.0	40	17	17	15	74
Hoby Milner	2	1	1.82	73	0	0	64.1	49	16	13	13	59
Elvis Peguero	4	5	3.38	59	0	1	61.1	49	25	23	26	54
Devin Williams	8	3	1.53	61	0	36	58.2	26	13	10	28	87
Eric Lauer	4	6	6.56	10	9	0	46.2	54	39	34	24	43
Peter Strzelecki	3	5	4.54	36	0	0	35.2	32	18	18	10	37
Trevor Megill	1	0	3.63	31	2	0	34.2	35	14	14	12	52
Abner Uribe	1	0	1.76	32	0	1	30.2	16	8	6	20	39
Andrew Chafin	1	1	5.82	20	0	0	17.0	14	13	11	10	14
J. C. Mejía	1	0	5.56	9	0	0	11.1	15	7	7	3	13
Matt Bush	0	2	9.58	12	0	1	10.1	11	11	11	6	10
Tyson Miller	0	0	5.79	7	0	0	9.1	9	6	6	3	7
Jake Cousins	0	0	4.82	9	0	0	9.1	10	5	5	10	7
Gus Varland	0	0	11.42	8	0	0	8.2	15	12	11	8	6
Javy Guerra	0	0	8.64	8	0	0	8.1	10	8	8	9	5
Janson Junk	0	1	4.91	2	1	0	7.1	8	5	4	2	5
J. B. Bukauskas	0	0	0.00	5	0	0	6.0	4	0	0	1	6
Ethan Small	0	0	11.25	2	0	1	4.0	9	5	5	2	6
Clayton Andrews	0	1	27.00	4	0	0	3.1	10	11	10	2	4
Thyago Vieira	0	1	0.00	2	0	0	3.0	0	1	0	1	2
Bennett Sousa	0	0	13.50	2	0	0	2.2	5	4	4	2	2
Thomas Pannone	0	0	6.75	1	0	0	2.2	5	2	2	1	4
Caleb Boushley	1	0	3.86	3	0	0	2.1	1	1	1	1	0
Rowdy Tellez	0	0	0.00	1	0	0	1.0	1	0	0	0	1
Alex Claudio	0	0	0.00	1	0	0	0.1	2	0	0	0	0
Totals	92	70	3.71	162	162	46	1443.0	1218	647	595	493	1425
Rank in NL	3	13	1	—	—	5	2	1	1	1	4	5

Source:Baseball Reference

== Game log ==
=== Opening day starters ===
Name	Pos.
Christian Yelich	LF
Jesse Winker	DH
Willy Adames	SS
Rowdy Tellez	1B
William Contreras	C
Luis Urías	3B
Garrett Mitchell	CF
Brian Anderson	RF
Brice Turang	2B
Corbin Burnes	P

=== Regular season ===
Please do not edit this line: OgreBot Begin-->

Legend
	Brewers win
	Brewers loss
	Postponement
	Clinched playoff spot
	Clinched division
**Bold**	Brewers team member

2023 regular season game log: 92–70 (Home: 49–32; Away: 43–38)
March–April: 18–10 (Home: 9–6; Away: 9–4)

#	Date	Opponent	Score	Win	Loss	Save	Attendance	Record	Box/ Streak
1	March 30	@ Cubs	0–4	Stroman (1–0)	**Burnes** (0–1)	—	36,054	0–1	L1
2	April 1	@ Cubs	3–1	**Strzelecki** (1–0)	Assad (0–1)	**Williams** (1)	31,363	1–1	W1
3	April 2	@ Cubs	9–5	**Lauer** (1–0)	Taillon (0–1)	—	33,266	2–1	W2
4	April 3	Mets	10–0	**Peralta** (1–0)	Carrasco (0–1)	**Wilson** (1)	42,017	3–1	W3
5	April 4	Mets	9–0	**Miley** (1–0)	Scherzer (1–1)	—	19,412	4–1	W4
6	April 5	Mets	7–6	**Williams** (1–0)	Ottavino (0–1)	—	18,387	5–1	W5
7	April 7	Cardinals	4–0	**Woodruff** (1–0)	Flaherty (1–1)	—	28,459	6–1	W6
8	April 8	Cardinals	0–6	Montgomery (2–0)	**Lauer** (1–1)	—	43,077	6–2	L1
9	April 9	Cardinals	6–1	**Peralta** (2–0)	Woodford (0–2)	—	27,701	7–2	W1
10	April 10	@ Diamondbacks	0–3	Gallen (1–1)	**Miley** (1–1)	Chafin (2)	12,681	7–3	L1
11	April 11	@ Diamondbacks	7–1	**Burnes** (1–1)	Kelly (0–2)	—	17,069	8–3	W1
12	April 12	@ Diamondbacks	3–7	Nelson (2–0)	**Junk** (0–1)	—	13,136	8–4	L1
13	April 13	@ Padres	4–3 (10)	**Williams** (2–0)	García (0–2)	**Payamps** (1)	43,296	9–4	W1
14	April 14	@ Padres	11–2	**Lauer** (2–1)	Wacha (2–1)	**Wilson** (2)	43,822	10–4	W2
15	April 15	@ Padres	3–10	Wilson (1–0)	**Peralta** (2–1)	—	42,284	10–5	L1
16	April 16	@ Padres	1–0	**Miley** (2–1)	Darvish (0–2)	**Williams** (2)	43,875	11–5	W1
17	April 17	@ Mariners	7–3	**Burnes** (2–1)	Flexen (0–3)	—	14,276	12–5	W2
18	April 18	@ Mariners	6–5 (11)	**Wilson** (1–0)	Topa (0–1)	—	18,206	13–5	W3
19	April 19	@ Mariners	5–3	**Lauer** (3–1)	Brash (1–2)	**Bush** (1)	17,461	14–5	W4
20	April 21	Red Sox	3–5	Pivetta (1–1)	**Peralta** (2–2)	Jansen (5)	24,976	14–6	L1
21	April 22	Red Sox	5–4	**Miley** (3–1)	Whitlock (1–2)	**Williams** (3)	31,965	15–6	W1
22	April 23	Red Sox	5–12	Ort (1–0)	**Bush** (0–1)	—	26,939	15–7	L1
23	April 24	Tigers	2–4	Boyd (1–1)	**Rea** (0–1)	Lange (2)	23,201	15–8	L2
24	April 25	Tigers	3–4	Turnbull (2–3)	**Lauer** (3–2)	Foley (2)	24,924	15–9	L3
25	April 26	Tigers	6–2	**Peralta** (3–2)	Lorenzen (0–1)	—	25,847	16–9	W1
26	April 28	Angels	2–1	**Strzelecki** (2–0)	Loup (0–2)	**Williams** (4)	24,787	17–9	W2
27	April 29	Angels	7–5	**Burnes** (3–1)	Detmers (0–2)	**Williams** (5)	39,198	18–9	W3
28	April 30	Angels	0–3	Suárez (1–1)	**Rea** (0–2)	Estévez (6)	33,557	18–10	L1

May: 11–16 (Home: 7–6; Away: 4–10)

#	Date	Opponent	Score	Win	Loss	Save	Attendance	Record	Box/ Streak
29	May 2	@ Rockies	2–3	Lawrence (1–1)	**Strzelecki** (2–1)	Johnson (4)	19,517	18–11	L2
30	May 3	@ Rockies	1–7	Freeland (3–3)	**Lauer** (3–3)	—	20,640	18–12	L3
31	May 4	@ Rockies	6–9	Hand (1–1)	**Strzelecki** (2–2)	—	30,647	18–13	L4
32	May 5	@ Giants	4–6	Manaea (1–1)	**Burnes** (3–2)	Doval (6)	28,614	18–14	L5
33	May 6	@ Giants	1–4	Cobb (2–1)	**Rea** (0–3)	Doval (7)	26,387	18–15	L6
34	May 7	@ Giants	7–3	**Payamps** (1–0)	Stripling (0–2)	—	34,603	19–15	W1
35	May 8	Dodgers	9–3	**Peralta** (4–2)	Gonsolin (0–1)	—	22,847	20–15	W2
36	May 9	Dodgers	2–6	Bruihl (1–0)	**Lauer** (3–4)	Phillips (6)	23,874	20–16	L1
37	May 10	Dodgers	1–8	Kershaw (6–2)	**Miley** (3–2)	—	30,112	20–17	L2
38	May 12	Royals	5–1	**Burnes** (4–2)	Taylor (0–1)	—	24,900	21–17	W1
39	May 13	Royals	4–3	**Williams** (3–0)	Hernández (0–1)	—	35,766	22–17	W2
40	May 14	Royals	9–6	**Lauer** (4–4)	Lyles (0–7)	—	33,188	23–17	W3
41	May 15	@ Cardinals	1–18	Flaherty (3–4)	**Peralta** (4–3)	—	34,548	23–18	L1
42	May 16	@ Cardinals	3–2	**Payamps** (2–0)	Montgomery (2–6)	**Williams** (6)	34,655	24–18	W1
43	May 17	@ Cardinals	0–3	Liberatore (1–0)	**Burnes** (4–3)	Helsley (5)	35,433	24–19	L1
44	May 19	@ Rays	0–1	Adam (2–0)	**Strzelecki** (2–3)	Fairbanks (4)	18,961	24–20	L2
45	May 20	@ Rays	4–8	Eflin (6–1)	**Lauer** (4–5)	Adam (6)	19,954	24–21	L3
46	May 21	@ Rays	6–4	**Peralta** (5–3)	Criswell (0–1)	**Williams** (7)	20,193	25–21	W1
47	May 22	Astros	2–12	Javier (5–1)	**Burnes** (4–4)	—	22,583	25–22	L1
48	May 23	Astros	6–0	**Rea** (1–3)	France (1–1)	—	23,062	26–22	W1
49	May 24	Astros	4–0	**Houser** (1–0)	Bielak (1–2)	—	28,262	27–22	W2
50	May 25	Giants	0–5	Junis (3–2)	**Teherán** (0–1)	—	24,536	27–23	L1
51	May 26	Giants	1–15	Wood (1–0)	**Peralta** (5–4)	Beck (1)	30,347	27–24	L2
52	May 27	Giants	1–3	Webb (4–5)	**Strzelecki** (2–4)	Doval (14)	39,269	27–25	L3
53	May 28	Giants	7–5	**Rea** (2–3)	Cobb (4–2)	**Williams** (8)	34,581	28–25	W1
54	May 30	@ Blue Jays	2–7	Kikuchi (6–2)	**Houser** (1–1)	—	32,930	28–26	L1
55	May 31	@ Blue Jays	4–2	**Teherán** (1–1)	Manoah (1–6)	**Williams** (9)	42,205	29–26	W1

June: 14–13 (Home: 6–6; Away: 8–7)

#	Date	Opponent	Score	Win	Loss	Save	Attendance	Record	Box/ Streak
56	June 1	@ Blue Jays	1–3	Gausman (4–3)	**Peralta** (5–5)	Romano (13)	42,059	29–27	L1
57	June 2	@ Reds	5–4 (11)	**Wilson** (2–0)	Cruz (1–1)	—	34,073	30–27	W1
58	June 3	@ Reds	10–8	**Rea** (3–3)	Ashcraft (3–4)	**Williams** (10)	25,485	31–27	W2
59	June 4	@ Reds	5–1	**Houser** (2–1)	Lively (3–3)	—	17,780	32–27	W3
60	June 5	@ Reds	0–2	Abbott (1–0)	**Teherán** (1–2)	Díaz (14)	13,687	32–28	L1
61	June 6	Orioles	4–3 (10)	**Strzelecki** (3–4)	Voth (1–2)	—	22,535	33–28	W1
62	June 7	Orioles	10–2	**Burnes** (5–4)	Kremer (6–3)	—	22,320	34–28	W2
63	June 8	Orioles	3–6	Akin (2–1)	**Strzelecki** (3–5)	Bautista (16)	27,318	34–29	L1
64	June 9	Athletics	2–5	Medina (1–5)	**Houser** (2–2)	May (2)	30,657	34–30	L2
65	June 10	Athletics	1–2 (10)	Fujinami (3–6)	**Payamps** (2–1)	Long (1)	35,157	34–31	L3
66	June 11	Athletics	6–8	Sears (1–3)	**Peralta** (5–6)	Long (2)	31,363	34–32	L4
67	June 13	@ Twins	5–7	Winder (1–0)	**Williams** (3–1)	—	34,514	34–33	L5
68	June 14	@ Twins	2–4	Ober (4–3)	**Rea** (3–4)	Jax (1)	32,222	34–34	L6
69	June 16	Pirates	5–4	**Teherán** (2–2)	Hill (6–6)	**Williams** (11)	25,586	35–34	W1
70	June 17	Pirates	5–0	**Miley** (4–2)	Keller (8–3)	—	37,283	36–34	W2
71	June 18	Pirates	5–2	**Megill** (1–0)	Moreta (3–2)	**Williams** (12)	38,073	37–34	W3
72	June 19	Diamondbacks	1–9	Kelly (9–3)	**Burnes** (5–5)	—	24,257	37–35	L1
73	June 20	Diamondbacks	7–5	**Wilson** (2–0)	Adams (0–1)	**Williams** (13)	27,048	38–35	W1
74	June 21	Diamondbacks	1–5	Gallen (9–2)	**Peguero** (1–1)	McGough (4)	31,397	38–36	L1
75	June 23	@ Guardians	7–1	**Miley** (5–2)	Bieber (5–5)	—	30,056	39–36	W1
76	June 24	@ Guardians	2–4	Bibee (4–2)	**Peralta** (5–7)	Clase (23)	32,349	39–37	L1
77	June 25	@ Guardians	5–4 (10)	**Williams** (4–1)	Stephan (3–3)	**Peguero** (1)	24,701	40–37	W1
78	June 26	@ Mets	2–1	**Rea** (4–4)	Smith (3–3)	**Williams** (14)	34,384	41–37	W2
79	June 27	@ Mets	2–7	Peterson (2–6)	**Teherán** (2–3)	—	35,295	41–38	L1
80	June 28	@ Mets	5–2	**Wilson** (3–0)	Hartwig (0–1)	**Williams** (15)	28,440	42–38	W1
81	June 29	@ Mets	3–2	**Houser** (3–2)	McFarland (0–1)	**Williams** (16)	30,282	43–38	W2
82	June 30	@ Pirates	7–8	Mlodzinski (1–1)	**Bush** (0–2)	—	29,179	43–39	L1

July: 14–11 (Home: 7–6; Away: 7–5)

#	Date	Opponent	Score	Win	Loss	Save	Attendance	Record	Box/ Streak
83	July 1	@ Pirates	11–8	**Burnes** (6–5)	Oviedo (3–9)	**Payamps** (2)	35,246	44–39	W1
84	July 2	@ Pirates	6–3	**Rea** (5–4)	Hill (7–8)	**Williams** (17)	21,884	45–39	W2
85	July 3	Cubs	8–6	**Payamps** (3–1)	Leiter Jr. (1–2)	**Williams** (18)	43,209	46–39	W3
86	July 4	Cubs	6–7 (11)	Palencia (1–0)	**Andrews** (0–1)	—	41,103	46–40	L1
87	July 5	Cubs	3–4	Rucker (2–1)	**Williams** (4–2)	Alzolay (5)	31,285	46–41	L2
88	July 6	Cubs	6–5	**Mejía** (1–0)	Fulmer (0–5)	**Payamps** (3)	33,366	47–41	W1
89	July 7	Reds	7–3	**Burnes** (7–5)	Abbott (4–1)	**Williams** (19)	30,970	48–41	W2
90	July 8	Reds	5–8	Sims (3–1)	**Peguero** (1–2)	Díaz (26)	39,124	48–42	L1
91	July 9	Reds	1–0	**Miley** (6–2)	Lively (4–5)	**Williams** (20)	32,848	49–42	W1
ASG	July 11	NL @ AL	3–2	Doval (1–0)	Bautista (0–1)	Kimbrel (1)	47,159	—	N/A
92	July 14	@ Reds	1–0	**Burnes** (8–5)	Ashcraft (4–7)	**Williams** (21)	41,516	50–42	W2
93	July 15	@ Reds	3–0	**Peralta** (6–7)	Abbott (4–2)	**Williams** (22)	39,897	51–42	W3
94	July 16	@ Reds	4–3	**Milner** (1–0)	Sims (3–2)	**Williams** (23)	30,927	52–42	W4
95	July 18	@ Phillies	3–4	Nola (9–6)	**Teherán** (2–4)	Kimbrel (16)	35,302	52–43	L1
96	July 19	@ Phillies	5–3	**Milner** (2–0)	Hoffman (3–2)	**Williams** (24)	33,753	53–43	W1
97	July 20	@ Phillies	4–0	**Burnes** (9–5)	Walker (11–4)	—	38,276	54–43	W2
98	July 21	Braves	4–6	Soroka (2–1)	**Peralta** (6–8)	Yates (2)	37,698	54–44	L1
99	July 22	Braves	4–3	**Payamps** (4–1)	Jiménez (0–3)	**Williams** (25)	39,707	55–44	W1
100	July 23	Braves	2–4	Hernández (1–0)	**Peguero** (1–3)	Iglesias (18)	38,605	55–45	L1
101	July 24	Reds	3–2	**Williams** (5–2)	Díaz (3–2)	—	29,216	56–45	W1
102	July 25	Reds	3–4	Abbott (6–2)	**Burnes** (9–6)	Díaz (30)	27,551	56–46	L1
103	July 26	Reds	3–0	**Peguero** (2–3)	Lively (4–6)	**Williams** (26)	38,596	57–46	W1
104	July 28	@ Braves	7–10	McHugh (4–1)	**Houser** (3–3)	Iglesias (19)	42,502	57–47	L1
105	July 29	@ Braves	5–11	Elder (8–2)	**Teherán** (2–5)	—	43,276	57–48	L2
106	July 30	@ Braves	6–8	Yates (5–0)	**Payamps** (4–2)	Iglesias (20)	40,262	57–49	L3
107	July 31	@ Nationals	3–5	Weems (2–0)	**Peguero** (2–4)	Finnegan (15)	19,290	57–50	L4

August: 17–9 (Home: 9–3; Away: 8–6)

#	Date	Opponent	Score	Win	Loss	Save	Attendance	Record	Box/ Streak
108	August 1	@ Nationals	6–4	**Peralta** (7–8)	Gray (7–9)	**Williams** (27)	19,847	58–50	W1
109	August 2	@ Nationals	2–3	Finnegan (5–3)	**Williams** (5–3)	—	17,312	58–51	L1
110	August 3	Pirates	14–1	**Houser** (4–3)	Keller (9–8)	—	25,930	59–51	W1
111	August 4	Pirates	4–8	De Los Santos (1–1)	**Rea** (5–5)	—	35,438	59–52	L1
112	August 5	Pirates	3–2 (10)	**Williams** (6–3)	Perdomo (2–2)	—	35,250	60–52	W1
113	August 6	Pirates	1–4	Oviedo (6–11)	**Woodruff** (1–1)	—	33,144	60–53	L1
114	August 7	Rockies	12–1	**Peralta** (8–8)	Lambert (2–3)	—	24,759	61–53	W1
115	August 8	Rockies	3–7 (10)	Koch (1–0)	**Chafin** (2–4)	—	25,365	61–54	L1
116	August 9	Rockies	7–6 (10)	**Wilson** (4–0)	Lawrence (3–5)	—	35,173	62–54	W1
117	August 11	@ White Sox	7–6 (10)	**Williams** (7–3)	Lambert (2–2)	**Uribe** (1)	30,059	63–54	W2
118	August 12	@ White Sox	3–2	**Woodruff** (2–1)	Scholtens (1–5)	**Williams** (28)	29,851	64–54	W3
119	August 13	@ White Sox	7–3	**Peralta** (9–8)	Cease (5–6)	—	24,495	65–54	W4
120	August 15	@ Dodgers	2–6	Miller (7–2)	**Houser** (4–4)	Yarbrough (1)	46,050	65–55	L1
121	August 16	@ Dodgers	1–7	Kershaw (11–4)	**Miley** (6–3)	—	41,413	65–56	L2
122	August 17	@ Dodgers	0–1	Ferguson (7–3)	**Payamps** (4–3)	Phillips (18)	43,195	65–57	L3
123	August 18	@ Rangers	9–8	**Peguero** (3–4)	Sborz (5–5)	**Williams** (29)	33,797	66–57	W1
124	August 19	@ Rangers	6–1	**Peralta** (10–8)	Dunning (9–5)	—	39,578	67–57	W2
125	August 20	@ Rangers	6–2	**Houser** (5–4)	Scherzer (12–5)	**Williams** (30)	37,138	68–57	W3
126	August 22	Twins	7–3	**Wilson** (5–0)	Floro (4–6)	—	38,688	69–57	W4
127	August 23	Twins	8–7 (10)	**Peguero** (4–4)	Durán (2–6)	—	38,164	70–57	W5
128	August 25	Padres	7–3	**Woodruff** (3–1)	Darvish (8–10)	—	33,089	71–57	W6
129	August 26	Padres	5–4	**Peralta** (11–8)	Ávila (0–1)	**Williams** (31)	39,945	72–57	W7
130	August 27	Padres	10–6	**Wilson** (6–0)	Wilson (1–2)	—	36,528	73–57	W8
131	August 28	@ Cubs	6–2	**Miley** (7–3)	Taillon (7–9)	—	35,097	74–57	W9
132	August 29	@ Cubs	0–1	Steele (15–3)	**Burnes** (9–7)	Alzolay (22)	33,294	74–58	L1
133	August 30	@ Cubs	2–3	Alzolay (2–4)	**Payamps** (4–4)	—	31,769	74–59	L2

September–October: 18–11 (Home: 11–5; Away: 7–6)

#	Date	Opponent	Score	Win	Loss	Save	Attendance	Record	Box/ Streak
134	September 1	Phillies	7–5	**Williams** (8–3)	Alvarado (0–1)	—	32,519	75–59	W1
135	September 2	Phillies	7–5	**Chafin** (3–4)	Nola (12–9)	**Williams** (32)	35,253	76–59	W2
136	September 3	Phillies	2–4	Domínguez (4–3)	**Miley** (7–4)	Kimbrel (22)	33,473	76–60	L1
137	September 4	@ Pirates	2–4	Ortiz (4–4)	**Burnes** (9–8)	Bednar (32)	10,831	76–61	L2
138	September 5	@ Pirates	7–3	**Woodruff** (4–1)	Jackson (1–2)	—	9,324	77–61	W1
139	September 6	@ Pirates	4–5	Mlodzinski (3–3)	**Peguero** (4–5)	Bednar (33)	8,594	77–62	L1
140	September 8	@ Yankees	8–2	**Uribe** (1–0)	Brito (6–7)	—	37,115	78–62	W1
141	September 9	@ Yankees	9–2	**Payamps** (5–4)	Loáisiga (0–2)	—	44,068	79–62	W2
142	September 10	@ Yankees	3–4 (13)	Misiewicz (2–0)	**Milner** (2–1)	—	41,702	79–63	L1
143	September 11	Marlins	12–0	**Woodruff** (5–1)	Luzardo (9–9)	—	21,792	80–63	W1
144	September 12	Marlins	3–1	**Peralta** (12–8)	Cabrera (6–7)	**Williams** (33)	26,466	81–63	W2
145	September 13	Marlins	0–2	Garrett (9–6)	**Rea** (5–6)	Scott (8)	24,251	81–64	L1
146	September 14	Marlins	4–2	**Houser** (6–4)	Pérez (5–5)	**Williams** (34)	26,529	82–64	W1
147	September 15	Nationals	5–3	**Miley** (8–4)	Irvin (3–6)	**Williams** (35)	35,428	83–64	W2
148	September 16	Nationals	9–5	**Payamps** (6–4)	Finnegan (7–5)	—	36,212	84–64	W3
149	September 17	Nationals	1–2 (11)	Garcia (1–2)	**Vieira** (0–1)	—	31,865	84–65	L1
150	September 18	@ Cardinals	0–1	Wainwright (5–11)	**Peralta** (12–9)	Helsley (12)	33,176	84–66	L2
151	September 19	@ Cardinals	7–3	**Rea** (6–6)	Rom (1–3)	—	35,760	85–66	W1
152	September 20	@ Cardinals	8–2	**Houser** (7–4)	Thompson (5–7)	—	37,008	86–66	W2
153	September 21	@ Cardinals	6–0	**Miley** (9–4)	Mikolas (7–13)	—	37,105	87–66	W3
154	September 22	@ Marlins	16–1	**Burnes** (10–8)	Okert (3–2)	—	15,884	88–66	W4
155	September 23	@ Marlins	4–5	Nardi (8–1)	**Payamps** (6–5)	Scott (10)	23,867	88–67	L1
156	September 24	@ Marlins	1–6	Cabrera (7–7)	**Peralta** (12–10)	—	17,538	88–68	L2
157	September 26*	Cardinals	1–4	Mikolas (8–13)	**Houser** (7–5)	Helsley (13)	36,755	88–69	L3
158	September 27	Cardinals	3–2	**Payamps** (7–5)	Barnes (0–1)	**Williams** (36)	31,256	89–69	W1
159	September 28	Cardinals	3–0	**Teherán** (3–5)	Hudson (6–3)	**Small** (1)	29,185	90–69	W2
160	September 29	Cubs	4–3 (10)	**Boushley** (1–0)	Cuas (3–2)	—	39,216	91–69	W3
161	September 30	Cubs	6–10	Wesneski (3–5)	**Lauer** (4–6)	Taillon (1)	42,652	91–70	L1
162	October 1	Cubs	4–0	**Houser** (8–5)	Smyly (11–11)	—	42,946	92–70	W1
* Despite losing to St. Louis on September 26, the Brewers clinched the NL Central on this day by virtue of a Chicago loss.

Legend: = Win = Loss = Postponement
Bold = Brewers team member

== Postseason ==
=== Game log ===
2023 Postseason game log: 0–2 (Home: 0–2; Away: 0–0)
NL Wild Card Series: 0–2 (Home: 0–2; Away: 0–0)

#	Date	Opponent	Score	Win	Loss	Save	Attendance	Record	Box/ Streak
1	October 3	Diamondbacks	3–6	Mantiply (1–0)	Burnes (0–1)	Sewald (1)	40,892	0–1	L1
2	October 4	Diamondbacks	2–5	Gallen (1–0)	Peralta (0–1)	Sewald (2)	41,166	0–2	L2

=== Postseason rosters ===
Playoff rosters
National League Wild Card Series

- Pitchers: 20 Wade Miley 29 Trevor Megill 31 Joel Payamps 38 Devin Williams 39 Corbin Burnes 45 Abner Uribe 46 Bryse Wilson 48 Colin Rea 51 Freddy Peralta 55 Hoby Milner 59 Elvis Peguero
- Catchers: 7 Víctor Caratini 24 William Contreras
- Infielders: 2 Brice Turang 3 Josh Donaldson 6 Owen Miller 14 Andruw Monasterio 27 Willy Adames 41 Carlos Santana
- Outfielders: 10 Sal Frelick 15 Tyrone Taylor 16 Blake Perkins 21 Mark Canha 22 Christian Yelich 28 Joey Wiemer 33 Jesse Winker

== Farm system ==
The Brewers' farm system consisted of seven minor league affiliates in 2023. The ACL Brewers won the Arizona Complex League championship.

Level	Team	League	Manager
Triple-A	Nashville Sounds	International League	Rick Sweet
Double-A	Biloxi Shuckers	Southern League	Mike Guerrero
High-A	Wisconsin Timber Rattlers	Midwest League	Joe Ayrault
Single-A	Carolina Mudcats	Carolina League	Victor Estevez
Rookie	ACL Brewers	Arizona Complex League	Rafael Neda
Rookie	DSL Brewers 1	Dominican Summer League	Fidel Pena
Rookie	DSL Brewers 2	Dominican Summer League	Natanael Mejia
