= Turang (surname) =

Turang is a surname. Notable people with the surname include:

- Brian Turang (born 1967), American baseball player
- Brice Turang (born 1999), American baseball player, son of Brian
- Peter Turang (1947–2025), Indonesian Roman Catholic Archbishop of Kupang (1997–2024)
