= Connor Dawson =

American baseball coach (born 1993)

Kansas City Royals – No. 70
- Hitting Coach
- Born: September 15, 1993 (age 33); Merriam, Kansas, U.S.

Teams
- Milwaukee Brewers (2022–2025); Kansas City Royals (2026-present)

Connor Dawson is an American professional baseball hitting coach for the Kansas City Royals of Major League Baseball (MLB).

== Career ==
Dawson graduated from Olathe North High School in Olathe, Kansas, in 2012. He played college baseball at Neosho County Community College, and transitioned into coaching. He coached a college prep baseball team and served as a hitting coach at Saint Thomas Aquinas High School from 2015 to 2018. In 2019, he coached for Marshalltown Community College.

Dawson joined the Seattle Mariners organization as a minor league hitting coach in 2019. Following the 2021 season, the Milwaukee Brewers fired their major league hitting coach, Andy Haines, and hired Dawson and Ozzie Timmons to replace him.

On November 7, 2025, Dawson was hired by the Kansas City Royals to serve as the team's hitting coach.
