= Terrmel Sledge =

American baseball player and coach

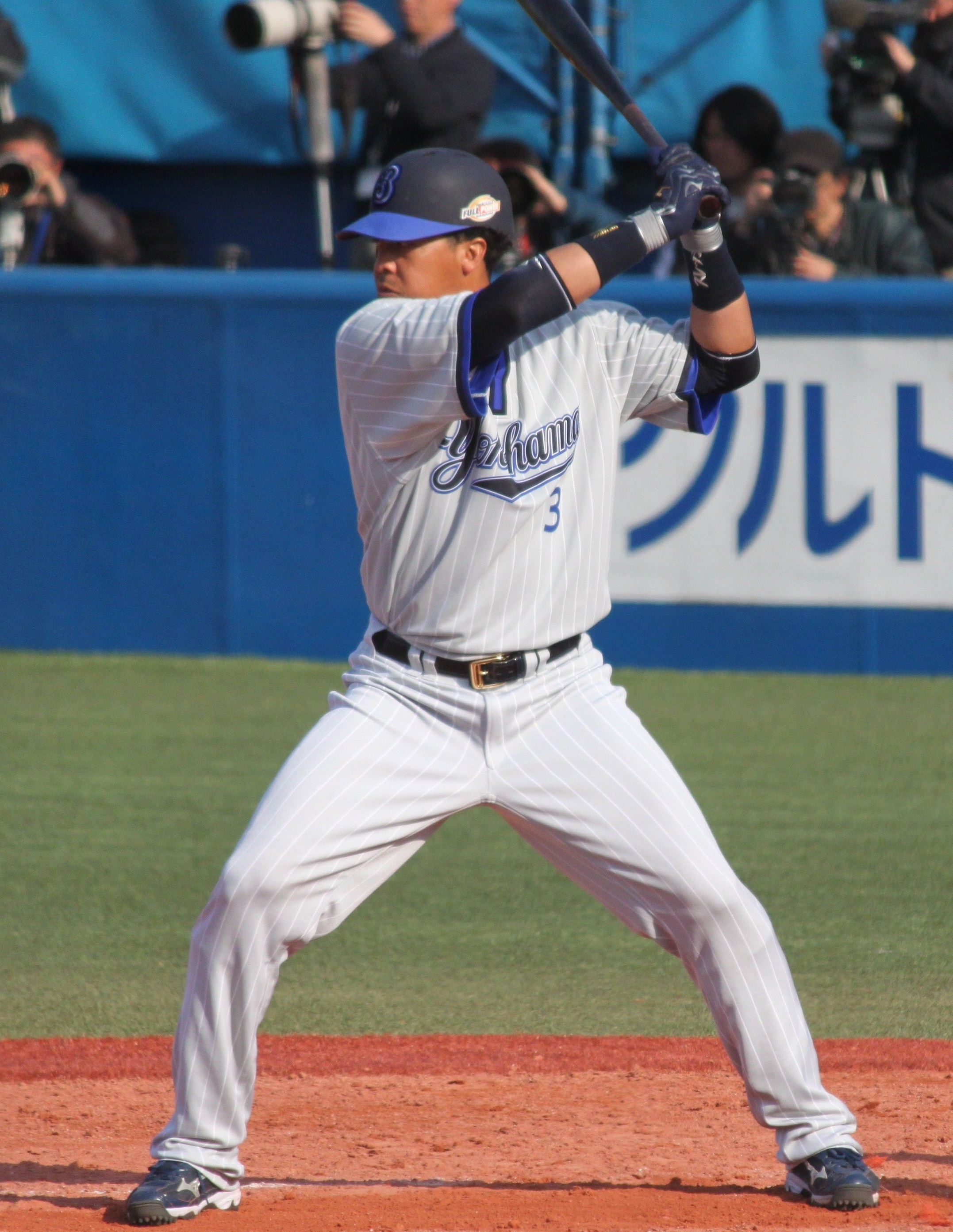
- Sledge with the Yokohama BayStars in 2010
- Outfielder
- Born: March 18, 1977 (age 49); Fayetteville, North Carolina, U.S.
- Batted: Left Threw: Left

Professional debut
- MLB: April 6, 2004, for the Montreal Expos
- NPB: March 20, 2008, for the Hokkaido Nippon-Ham Fighters

Last appearance
- MLB: October 1, 2007, for the San Diego Padres
- NPB: June 13, 2012, for the Hokkaido Nippon-Ham Fighters

MLB statistics
- Batting average: .247
- Home runs: 25
- Runs batted in: 100

NPB statistics
- Batting average: .263
- Home runs: 96
- Runs batted in: 315
- Stats at Baseball Reference

Teams
- Montreal Expos / Washington Nationals (2004–2005); San Diego Padres (2006–2007); Hokkaido Nippon-Ham Fighters (2008–2009); Yokohama BayStars (2010–2011); Hokkaido Nippon-Ham Fighters (2012); As Coach: Chicago Cubs (2019-2020)

Terrmel Sledge (born March 18, 1977), also known as Terrence Melvin Sledge, is an American former professional baseball outfielder and the former assistant hitting coach of the Chicago Cubs. He played in Major League Baseball (MLB) for the Montreal Expos/Washington Nationals and San Diego Padres and in Nippon Professional Baseball (NPB) for the Hokkaido Nippon-Ham Fighters and the Yokohama BayStars. Prior to being hired by the Cubs, he was the hitting coach for the Tulsa Drillers in the Texas League.

== Amateur career ==
Sledge attended John F. Kennedy High School in Granada Hills, California and played college baseball at Long Beach State. In 1997, he played collegiate summer baseball with the Brewster Whitecaps of the Cape Cod Baseball League.

== Professional career ==
Sledge's major league career began in 2004 with the Montreal Expos. He batted .269/.336/.462 with 15 home runs and 62 runs batted in in his rookie year. On September 29, 2004 he was the final out at the last Expos home game when he popped out to third base in 9-1 loss to the Florida Marlins On October 3, 2004, he recorded the final hit and RBI in Expos history when he drove in Jamey Carroll on an RBI single in a game against the New York Mets.

Sledge moved with the team to Washington, D.C. the following season as the Expos relocated, and hit the first-ever home run for the Washington Nationals. He was traded to the Texas Rangers along with fellow outfielder Brad Wilkerson and Armando Galarraga for second baseman Alfonso Soriano on December 7, 2005. He was subsequently traded to the San Diego Padres in a six-player deal on January 6, 2006.

On November 29, 2007, Sledge was granted permission by the Padres to sign with the Hokkaido Nippon-Ham Fighters of the Nippon Professional League.

On December 17, 2009, Sledge signed a contract with Yokohama BayStars for the 2010 season.

In October 2003, while training with the USA Olympic baseball team, Sledge became one of the first MLB players to test positive for performance-enhancing drugs. Sledge was not subject to discipline by MLB as the substance was not barred under league rules at the time.

== Coaching career ==
Sledge retired after the 2012 season and spent 2015 as the assistant hitting coach for the Eugene Emeralds. In 2016, he was named hitting coach for the Tulsa Drillers of the AA Texas League.

In late 2018, the Chicago Cubs hired Sledge as assistant hitting coach for the 2019 season. He took over the position held by Andy Haines, who was hired to be the Milwaukee Brewers' hitting coach. The organization did not tender Sledge a contract to return for the 2021 season.

In 2023, he was named as the hitting coach for the Amarillo Sod Poodles the Double-A affiliate of the Arizona Diamondbacks. In 2025, he was promoted to be the assistant hitting coach for the Reno Aces the Diamondbacks Triple-A affiliate.

== Personal life ==
Sledge is half Korean and half African American; his mother is Korean and his father is black. According to his father, his name is a combination of Terrence and Melvin, two names his parents had considered naming him when he was born. Sledge has two children.

Preceded by Andy Haines	Chicago Cubs assistant hitting coach 2019-2020	Succeeded by Chris Valaika
