= Andrew Abbott =

American baseball player (born 1999)

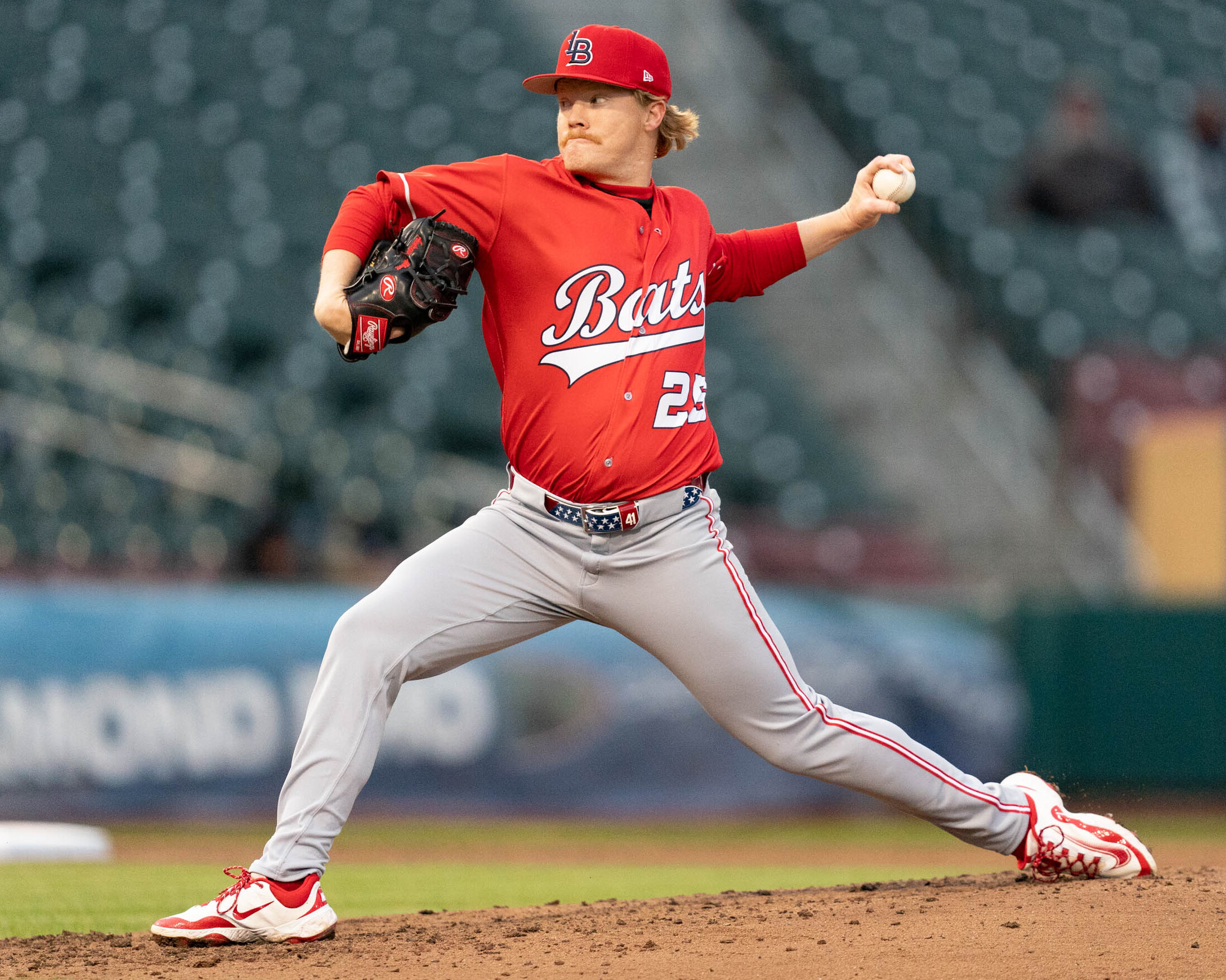
- Abbott with the Louisville Bats in 2025

Cincinnati Reds – No. 41
- Pitcher
- Born: June 1, 1999 (age 27); Lynchburg, Virginia, U.S.
- Bats: Left Throws: Left

MLB debut
- June 5, 2023, for the Cincinnati Reds

MLB statistics (through 2026 season)
- Win–loss record: 34–34
- Earned run average: 3.76
- Strikeouts: 514
- Stats at Baseball Reference

Teams
- Cincinnati Reds (2023–present)

Career highlights and awards
- All-Star (2025)

Andrew Cole Abbott (born June 1, 1999) is an American professional baseball pitcher for the Cincinnati Reds of Major League Baseball (MLB). He made his MLB debut in 2023. In 2025, Abbott was named to his first All-Star game.

== Amateur career ==
Abbott attended Halifax County High School in South Boston, Virginia. He was selected by the New York Yankees in the 36th round of the 2017 Major League Baseball draft but did not sign and played college baseball at the University of Virginia. In 2018, he played collegiate summer baseball with the Orleans Firebirds of the Cape Cod Baseball League.

== Professional career ==
After four years at Virginia, Abbott was selected by the Cincinnati Reds in the second round, 53rd overall, of the 2021 MLB draft and signed. He spent his first professional season with the Arizona Complex League Reds and Daytona Tortugas. He started 2022 with the Dayton Dragons and was promoted to the Chattanooga Lookouts during the season. In 91 innings at Double-A (across 20 starts), he posted a 4.75 ERA with 119 strikeouts and 41 walks.

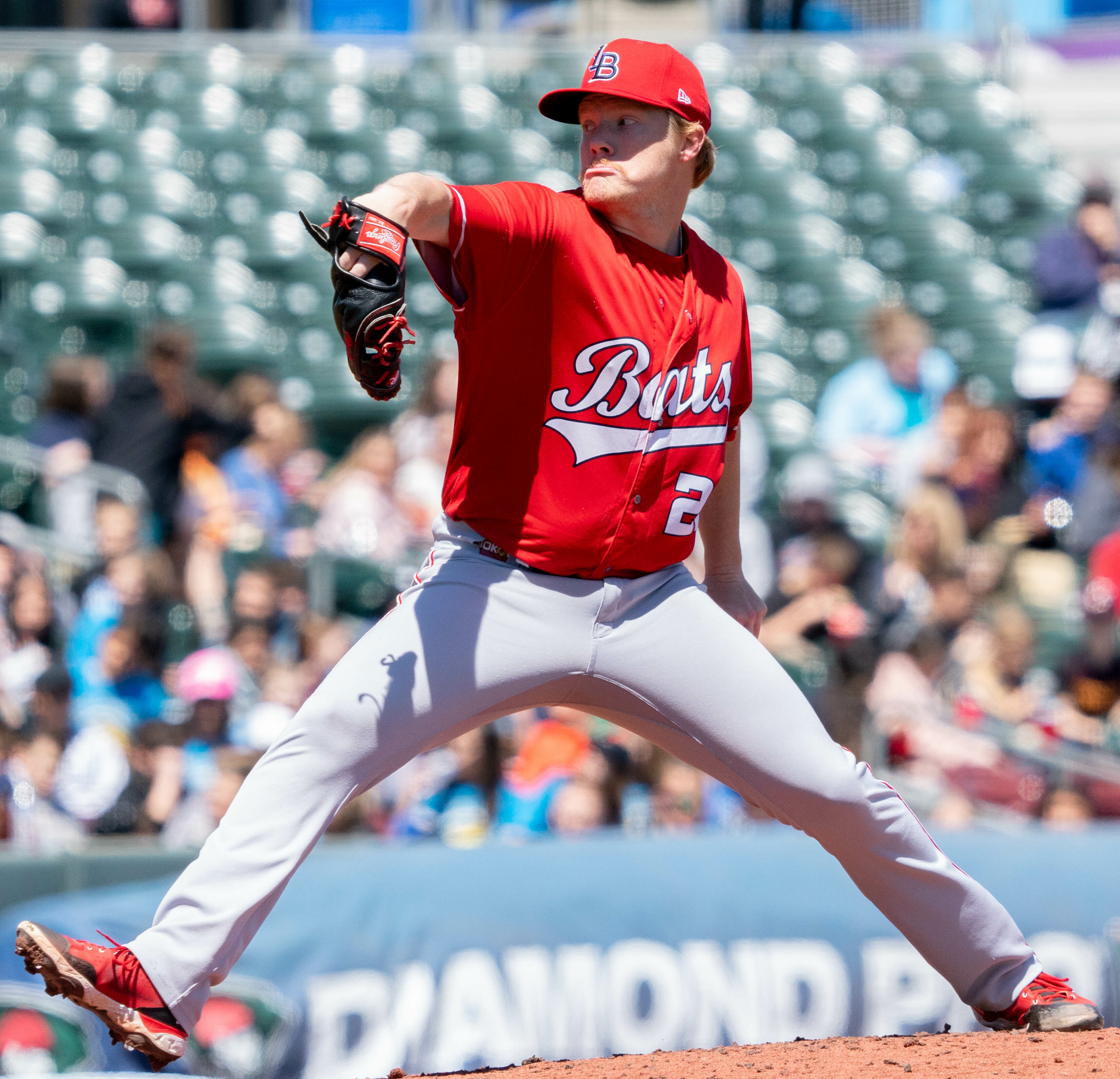
Abbott in 2023

He was one of five Reds prospects invited to the team's 2023 spring training camp. Abbott began the year with Double-A Chattanooga, posting a 1.15 ERA across 3 starts before he promoted to the Triple-A Louisville Bats. In 7 starts for Louisville, Abbott logged a 3–0 record and 3.05 ERA with 54 strikeouts in 38 1/3 innings of work.

On June 4, 2023, the Reds announced that Abbott would be promoted to the major leagues for the first time to start against the Milwaukee Brewers the following day, after Hunter Greene had his start pushed back due to hip stiffness. Abbott made his major league debut on June 5 and threw 6 shutout innings versus the Brewers, striking out 6 batters and allowing only 1 hit, making him the only left-hander in the Modern Era to pitch at least 6 scoreless innings with at least 6 strikeouts and no more than one hit allowed in an MLB debut, and the first Reds pitcher to do so since 1893. On June 16, Abbott surrendered four hits over six scoreless innings against the Houston Astros to become first MLB pitcher to hurl three scoreless starts of at least five innings since 1893. Abbott finished his rookie season with an 8–6 record and 3.87 ERA in 21 starts, striking out 120 batters in 109 1/3 innings.

In the 2024 season, he was 10–10 with a 3.72 ERA in 130 innings, striking out 114 batters over 25 starts. His season ended prematurely after he was diagnosed with a left (pitching) shoulder strain, for which he was placed on the injured list on August 20th, and from which he did not return in 2024.

Heading into the 2025 season, Abbott was expected to be in the Reds' pitching rotation again, but the same shoulder injury delayed his start to the season by 15 days. He made his 2025 season debut on April 12, notching his first win of the season in a 5–2 victory over the Pittsburgh Pirates. On June 10, Abbott pitched a complete-game shutout in a 1–0 win over the Cleveland Guardians, allowing three hits while striking out 5 batters and walking one, having thrown 110 pitches. It was the first complete game of his major league career.

With a 7–1 record and a 2.15 ERA, Abbott was named to the 2025 National League All-Star team as a replacement for Yoshinobu Yamamoto.

== Personal life ==
Abbott is the son of David and Jeanette Abbott. He has two sisters. He graduated from college in three years with a degree in biology. Abbott became engaged to his fiancé Lindsay Stone on May 22nd, Stone is a Cincinnati native and TV anchor for WLWT 5.
