= Tress Way =

American football player (born 1990)

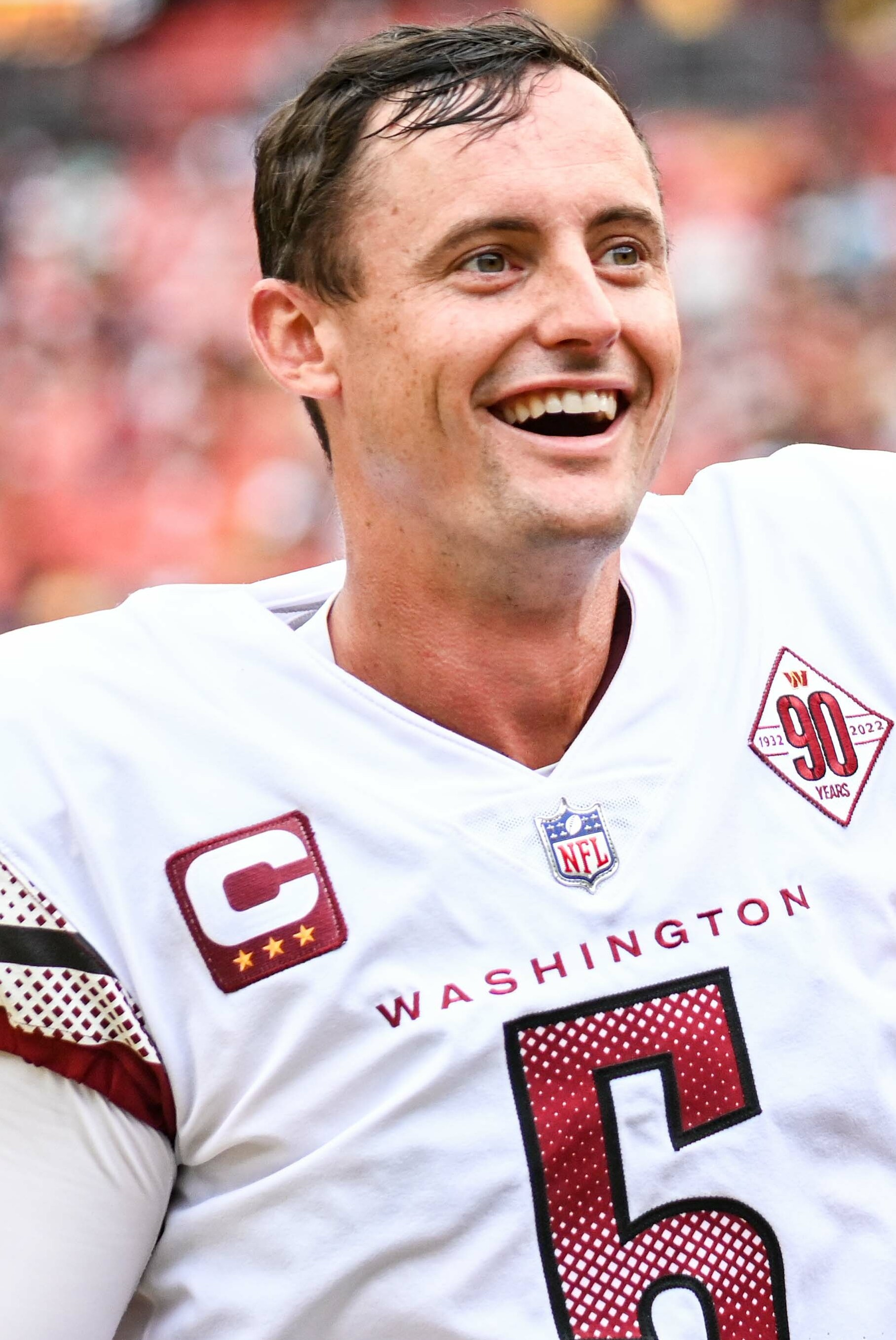
- Way with the Washington Commanders in 2022

No. 10 – Washington Commanders
- Position: Punter
- Roster status: Active

Personal information
- Born: April 18, 1990 (age 36); Tulsa, Oklahoma, U.S.
- Listed height: 6 ft 1 in (1.85 m)
- Listed weight: 220 lb (100 kg)

Career information
- High school: Union (Tulsa)
- College: Oklahoma (2008–2012)
- NFL draft: 2013: undrafted

Career history
- Chicago Bears (2013–2014)*; Washington Redskins / Football Team / Commanders (2014–present)
- * Offseason or practice squad member only

Awards and highlights
- Second-team All-Pro (2019); 3× Pro Bowl (2019, 2022, 2025); Third-team All-American (2009); Second-team All-Big 12 (2009)

Career NFL statistics as of Week 10, 2026
- Games played: 205
- Punts: 872
- Punting yards: 40,980
- Punting average: 47.0
- Inside 20: 338
- Stats at Pro Football Reference

Tressler William Way (born April 18, 1990) is an American professional football punter for the Washington Commanders of the National Football League (NFL). He played college football for the Oklahoma Sooners and signed with the Chicago Bears as an undrafted free agent in 2013. Way joined Washington the following year, making three Pro Bowls and earning second-team All-Pro honors in 2019 and becoming the franchise's leader in punting yards. Way punts left-footed, a relative rarity in the NFL.

== Early life and college career ==
Way was born on April 18, 1990, in Tulsa, Oklahoma. He graduated from Tulsa's Union High School in 2008. Way attended the University of Oklahoma and redshirted his freshman season with the Oklahoma Sooners football team. Way switched to punter after a stint at kicker. Way completed his bachelor's degree at Oklahoma in interdisciplinary studies in December 2012.

== Professional career ==
=== Chicago Bears ===
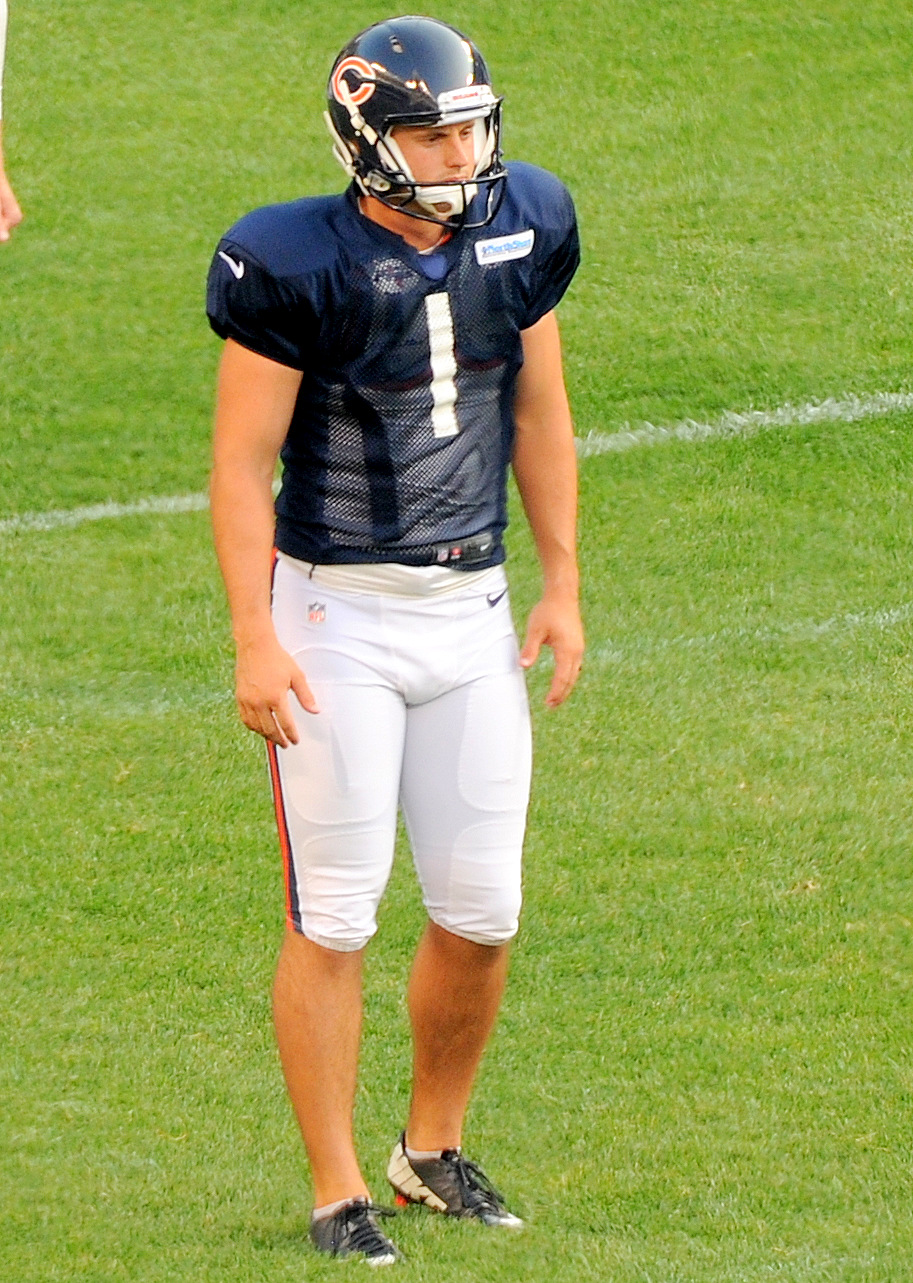
Way with the Chicago Bears in 2014

The Chicago Bears signed Way as an undrafted free agent on April 28, 2013. He was brought in to challenge veteran Adam Podlesh. The Bears waived him on August 25.

Way re-signed with the Bears for the 2014 offseason, but he was waived again after losing out to rookie Pat O'Donnell on August 18, 2014.

=== Washington Redskins / Football Team / Commanders ===
The Washington Redskins claimed Way off waivers on August 20, 2014. In his first preseason game with the team, Way recorded an average of 45.3 yards off of four punts. He became the starting punter for the 2014 season following the release of Robert Malone. For the 2014 season, Way led the NFL in gross punting average with 47.5 yards. He finished his rookie season with 77 punts with a 47.52 average.

At the start of the 2015 season, Way was voted as the team's special teams captain. Overall, he finished the 2015 season with 70 punts for a 46.6 average.

On March 4, 2016, the team extended a tender to Way, and on March 12, they signed him to a five-year contract extension. He finished that season with 49 punts for a 45.08 average.

In the 2017 season, Way finished with 83 punts for a 45.7 average.

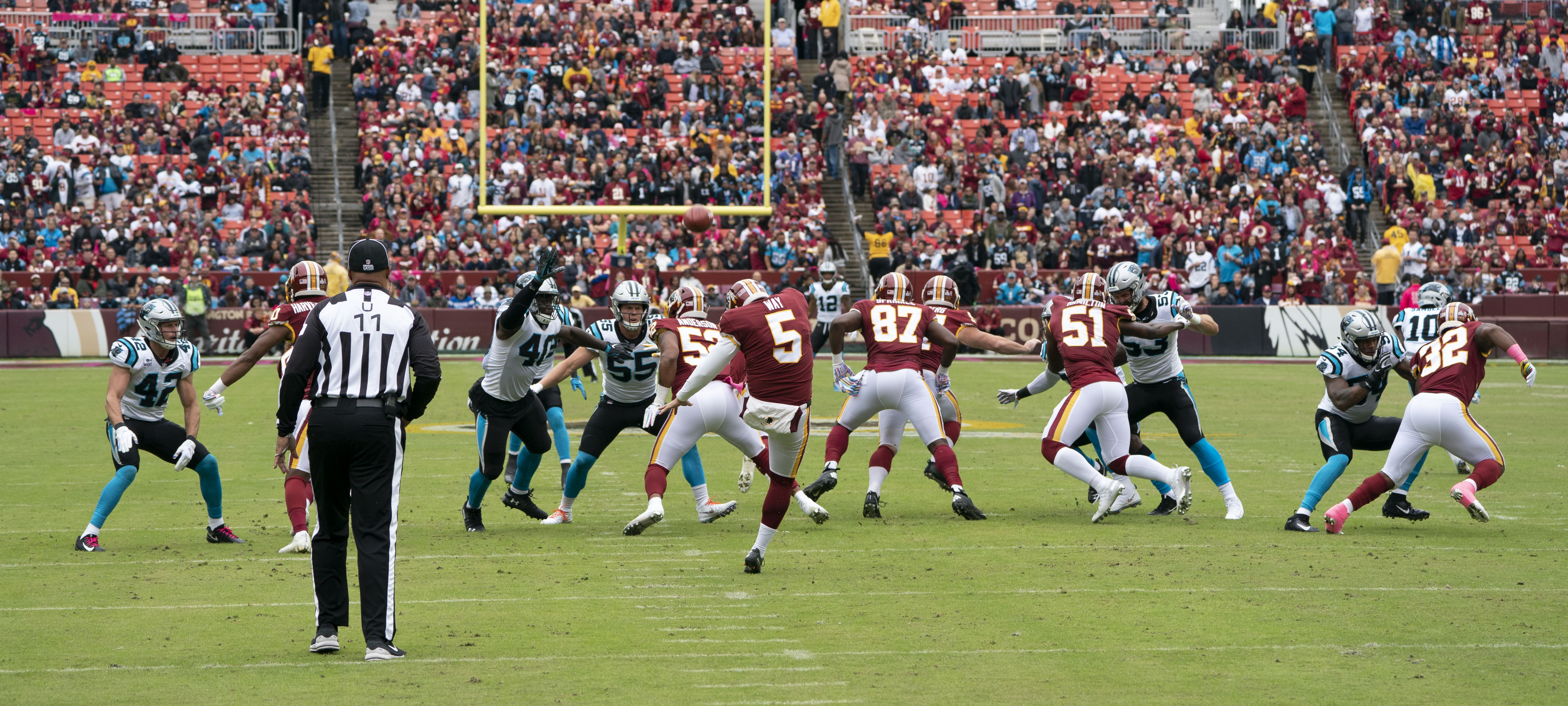
Way punting against the Carolina Panthers, 2018

In Week 10 of the 2018 season, Way punted five times for a net average of 47.8, downing four punts inside the 20-yard line, in a 16–3 win over the Tampa Bay Buccaneers, earning him National Football Conference (NFC) Special Teams Player of the Week. Overall, Way finished the 2018 season with 79 punts for a 45.33 average.

In Week 13 of the 2019 season, Way hit two of his five punts inside the 20 with an average of 58 yards per punt and a long of 79 yards in a 29–21 win over the Carolina Panthers, earning NFC Special Teams Player of the Week. For his performance in 2019, Way was voted to the 2020 Pro Bowl, as well as being named second-team All-Pro. On December 27, 2019, Way signed a four-year, $15 million contract extension. He finished the 2019 season with 79 punts for a 49.61 average. In the 2019 season, he led the NFL in yards per punt. In addition, he recorded the longest punt of the 2019 season with a 79-yarder. He was named to the Pro Bowl for the first time.

In Week 11 of the 2020 season against the Cincinnati Bengals, Way punted five times with a gross average of 50.4 yards while landing three of them inside the 20 during the 20–9 win, later earning the NFC Special Teams Player of the Week award. In Week 14 against the San Francisco 49ers, Way averaged 49.8 yards on 8 punts during the 23–15 win. Way was named the NFC Special Teams Player of the Week for his performance in Week 14. In the 2020 season, Way appeared in all 16 games. He recorded 73 total punts for a 48.00 average.

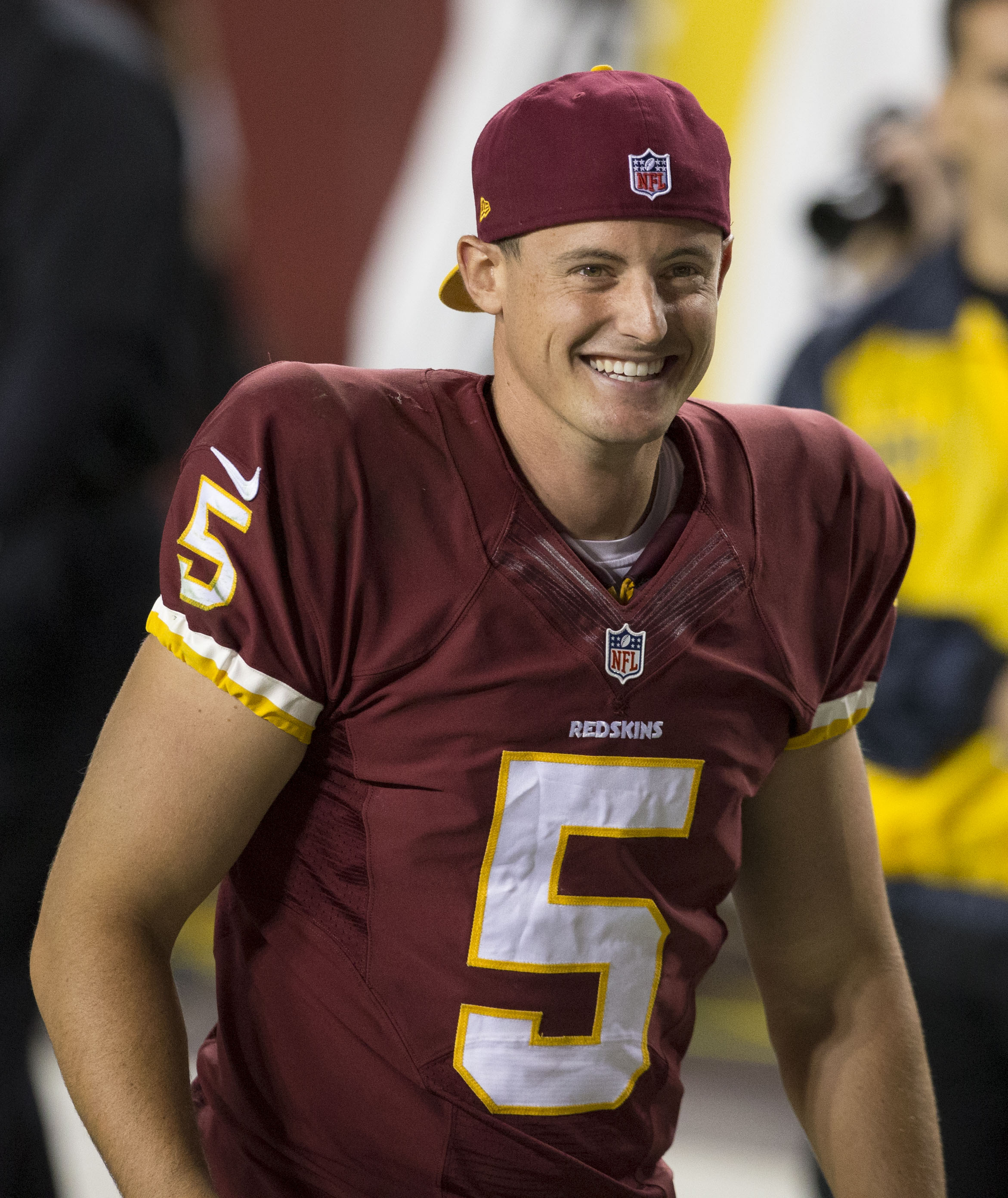
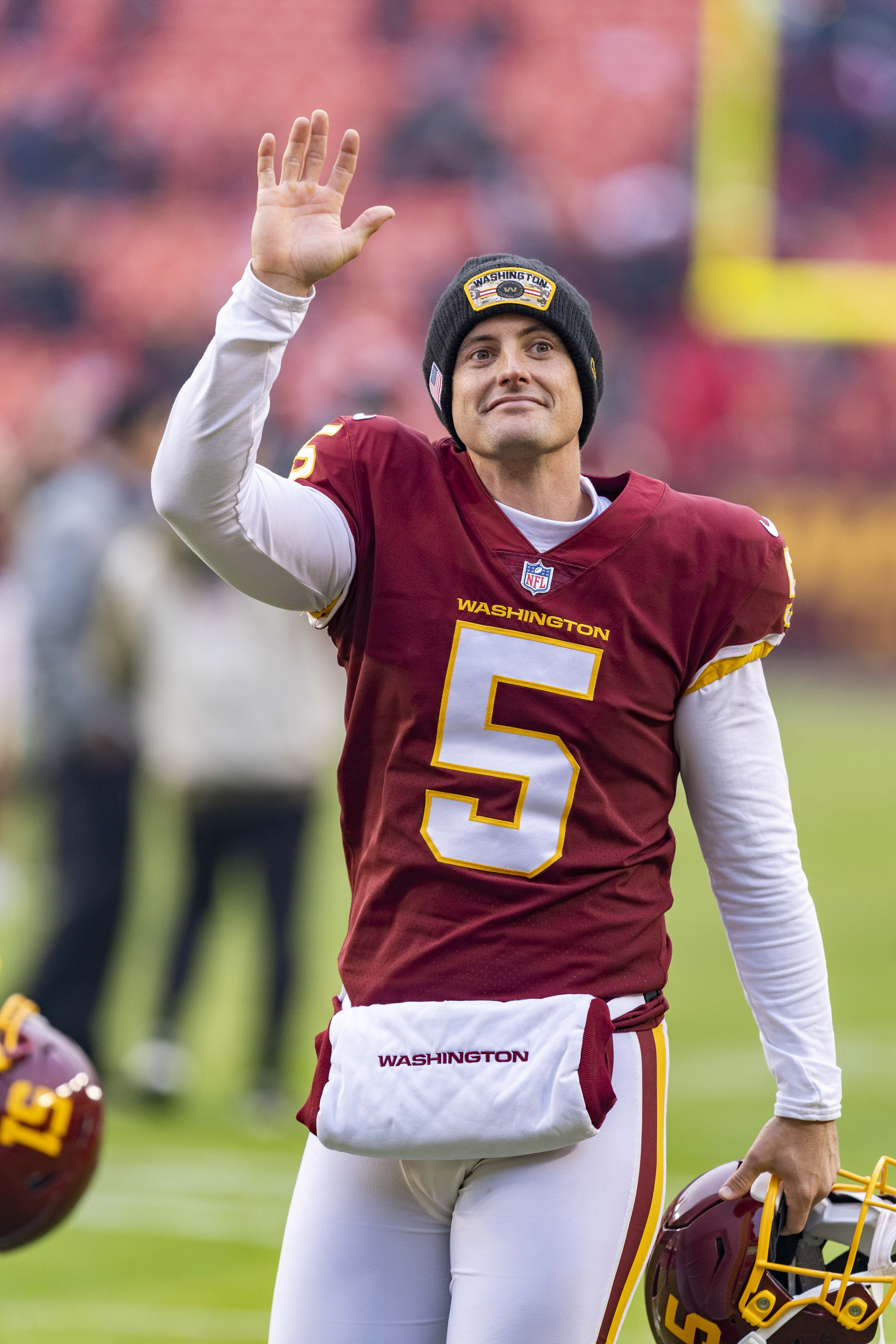
Way throughout his time playing for Washington, 2014 (left) and 2021 (right)

In the 2021 season, Way played in 16 games. He recorded 60 total punts for a 48.35 average.

Way was named NFC Special Teams Player of the Month for October 2022. In the 2022 season, Way recorded 83 punts with a 46.81 average. In December 2022, Way was voted into the 2023 Pro Bowl.

Way was named NFC Special Teams Player of the Week in Week 9 of the 2023 season after placing four of his five punts inside the 20-yard line in a 20–17 road victory over the New England Patriots. In the 2023 season, he had 73 punt for 3,361 yards for a 46.04 average. He gave up his uniform number 5 in a deal with quarterback Jayden Daniels after the team selected the latter second overall in the 2024 NFL draft. Way had worn the number since joining the team in 2014. By the end of the 2024 season, Way became Washington's franchise leader in punting yards. In the 2024 season, he had 50 punts for 2,343 yards for a 46.86 average. In the 2024 NFC Championship Game against the Eagles, he completed a 23-yard pass off a fake punt to Ben Sinnott. It marked his first passing attempt since the 2018 season.

Way re-signed with the Commanders on a one-year contract on March 20, 2025. On December 23, 2025, the league announced Way was the only player from the team to be voted into the 2026 Pro Bowl Games. He finished the 2025 season with 56 punts for 2,651 total yards for a 47.3 average.

On February 10, 2026, Way signed a one-year extension with the Commanders. On September 10, Way announced his intent to retire following the 2026 season.

== Career statistics ==
=== NFL ===
Legend
	Led the league
**Bold**	Career high

==== Regular season ====
Year	Team	GP	Punting				
Year	Team	GP	Punts	Yds	Lng	Blk	Avg
2014	WAS	16	77	3,659	77	**1**	47.5
2015	WAS	16	70	3,224	64	**1**	46.1
2016	WAS	16	49	2,209	61	0	45.1
2017	WAS	16	**83**	3,794	64	0	45.7
2018	WAS	16	79	3,581	63	0	45.3
2019	WAS	16	79	**3,919**	**79**	0	**49.6**
2020	WAS	16	73	3,504	65	0	48.0
2021	WAS	16	60	2,901	66	0	48.4
2022	WAS	17	**83**	3,885	68	0	46.8
2023	WAS	17	73	3,504	68	**1**	46.8
2024	WAS	17	50	2,342	74	0	46.9
2025	WAS	17	56	2,651	71	0	47.3
2026	WAS	9	40	1,949	60	0	48.7
Career		205	872	40,980	79	3	47.0

==== Postseason ====
Year	Team	GP	Punting				
Year	Team	GP	Punts	Yds	Lng	Blk	Avg
2015	WAS	1	**5**	**253**	**60**	0	**50.6**
2020	WAS	1	**5**	219	52	0	43.8
2024	WAS	**3**	2	93	48	0	46.5
Career		5	12	565	60	0	47

=== College ===
College statistics
Season	Punting		
Season	Punts	Yds	Avg
2009	61	2,787	45.7
2010	73	3,212	44
2011	63	2,649	42
2012	53	2,340	44.2
Career	250	10,988	44

== Personal life ==
In 2013, Way married Brianna Turang, a softball and soccer player at the University of Oklahoma, sister of current Milwaukee Brewers infielder Brice Turang, and daughter of former Major League Baseball outfielder Brian Turang. The two have four children together; three biological (one son and two daughters) and one son who was adopted. His younger brother, Cole, was a punter for the University of Tulsa and had a brief stint as a professional baseball pitcher who played three seasons for the Kansas City Royals. He is a Christian. Way punts left-footed, considered relatively rare in the NFL.
