= Andy Haines =

American baseball coach (born 1977)

- Hitting coach
- Born: April 2, 1977 (age 49)
- Stats at Baseball Reference

Teams
- Chicago Cubs (2018); Milwaukee Brewers (2019–2021); Pittsburgh Pirates (2022–2024)

Andy Haines (born April 2, 1977) is an American professional baseball coach and manager. He has previously served on the coaching staffs of the Chicago Cubs, Milwaukee Brewers and Pittsburgh Pirates of Major League Baseball (MLB).

== Career ==
Haines attended Eastern Illinois University, and played college baseball for the Eastern Illinois Panthers as a catcher. After graduating from Eastern Illinois, he served as an assistant for the baseball team at Olney Central College. He joined the Middle Tennessee State University (MTSU) baseball team as a graduate assistant in 2002. He spent three years at Middle Tennessee, earning a master's degree.

Haines spent two years as the manager of the summer-collegiate Waterloo Bucks in 2003 and 2004, and served as a hitting coach with the independent-league Gary SouthShore RailCats of the Northern League in 2005 and 2006. He debuted as a manager for the Windy City ThunderBolts of the independent Frontier League in 2007. He became a hitting coach in the Miami Marlins' organization in 2008, working for the Gulf Coast Marlins of the Rookie-level Gulf Coast League. The next year, he managed the Jamestown Jammers of the Low–A New York-Penn League. Haines managed the Greensboro Grasshoppers of the Single–A South Atlantic League in 2010 and 2011, leading the team to the league's championship in 2011. The next two seasons, he managed the Jupiter Hammerheads of the High–A Florida State League. He managed the New Orleans Zephyrs of the Triple–A Pacific Coast League in 2014 and 2015.

In 2016, the Chicago Cubs hired Haines as their minor league hitting instructor. After the 2017 season, the Cubs promoted him to their major league staff as their assistant hitting coach.

Haines left the Cubs to become hitting coach for the Milwaukee Brewers in November 2018. The Brewers fired Haines after the 2021 season, and he was hired as the hitting coach for the Pittsburgh Pirates. The Pirates fired Haines after the 2024 season.

== Personal life ==
Haines is from Louisville, Illinois. He met his wife, Erin, while at MTSU. They have three children. His younger brother, Kyle, is the director of player development for the San Francisco Giants.

Sporting positions
Preceded by Eric Hinske	Chicago Cubs assistant hitting coach 2018	Succeeded by Terrmel Sledge
Preceded by Darnell Coles	Milwaukee Brewers hitting coach 2019–2021	Succeeded by Ozzie Timmons
Preceded by Rick Eckstein	Pittsburgh Pirates hitting coach 2022–2024	Succeeded by Vacant
