= Brian Turang =

American baseball player (born 1967)

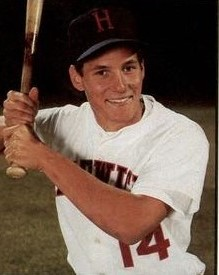
- Turang with the Harwich Mariners in 1988
- Outfielder
- Born: June 14, 1967 (age 59); Long Beach, California, U.S.
- Batted: Right Threw: Right

MLB debut
- August 13, 1993, for the Seattle Mariners

Last MLB appearance
- July 23, 1994, for the Seattle Mariners

MLB statistics
- Batting average: .222
- Home runs: 1
- Runs batted in: 15
- Stats at Baseball Reference

Teams
- Seattle Mariners (1993–1994)

Brian Craig Turang (born June 14, 1967) is an American former professional baseball outfielder, who played for the Seattle Mariners of Major League Baseball (MLB) in 1993 and 1994. Turang played college baseball for Long Beach City College and Loyola Marymount University and was drafted by the Mariners in the 1989 MLB draft. He is the father of MLB infielder Brice Turang.

== Career ==
Turang attended Millikan High School in Long Beach, California where he was third team All-CIF Southern Section as a catcher in 1985.

Turang played college baseball at Long Beach City College and Loyola Marymount University. He switched to playing the outfield and second base at Long Beach City College. In two years at Loyola Marymount, he hit .332 and led the team with 15 home runs in 1988. After his first season at Loyola Marymount, the Milwaukee Brewers drafted Turang in the 20th round of the 1987 MLB draft, but he did not sign professionally.

Turang played collegiate summer baseball with the Fairbanks Goldpanners in the Alaska Baseball League in 1987, being named second-team all league, and the Harwich Mariners of the Cape Cod Baseball League in 1988.

The Seattle Mariners drafted Turang in the 51st round of the 1989 MLB draft. He made his professional debut that summer with the short-season Bellingham Mariners, leading the team in on base percentage, triples, and times hit by pitch. He was the leadoff hitter the night of Alex Rodriguez's MLB debut. His only major league home run was off Jimmy Key at Yankee Stadium on April 20, 1994.

After leaving the Mariners organization after the 1995 season, Turang played in 37 games for the Triple-A Syracuse Chiefs in the Toronto Blue Jays minor league system.

== Personal life ==
Turang's wife Carrie played college softball at Long Beach State, playing in the Women's College World Series (WCWS). They have five children. Their youngest, Brice, was the Milwaukee Brewers' first round selection in the 2018 MLB draft, made his MLB debut in 2023, and won a Platinum Glove award in 2024.

The Turangs' daughter, Brianna, played softball and soccer for the University of Oklahoma, where she won the 2013 WCWS and was named to the 2012 WCWS all-tournament team. In college, she met her husband, professional football punter Tress Way.

The Turangs have three other daughters, Carissa, Cabria, and Bailee, who also were college athletes. Carissa played softball at Southern Mississippi and Cal State Fullerton and soccer at Oklahoma City University. Cabria played soccer at the University of Utah Bailee played volleyball at Southern Nazarene University. The family was featured on an episode of the 2005 NBC reality television show Meet Mister Mom.

Turang operated a baseball and softball training center in Corona, California, where he trained Brice to hit.
