= Brice Turang =

American baseball player (born 1999)

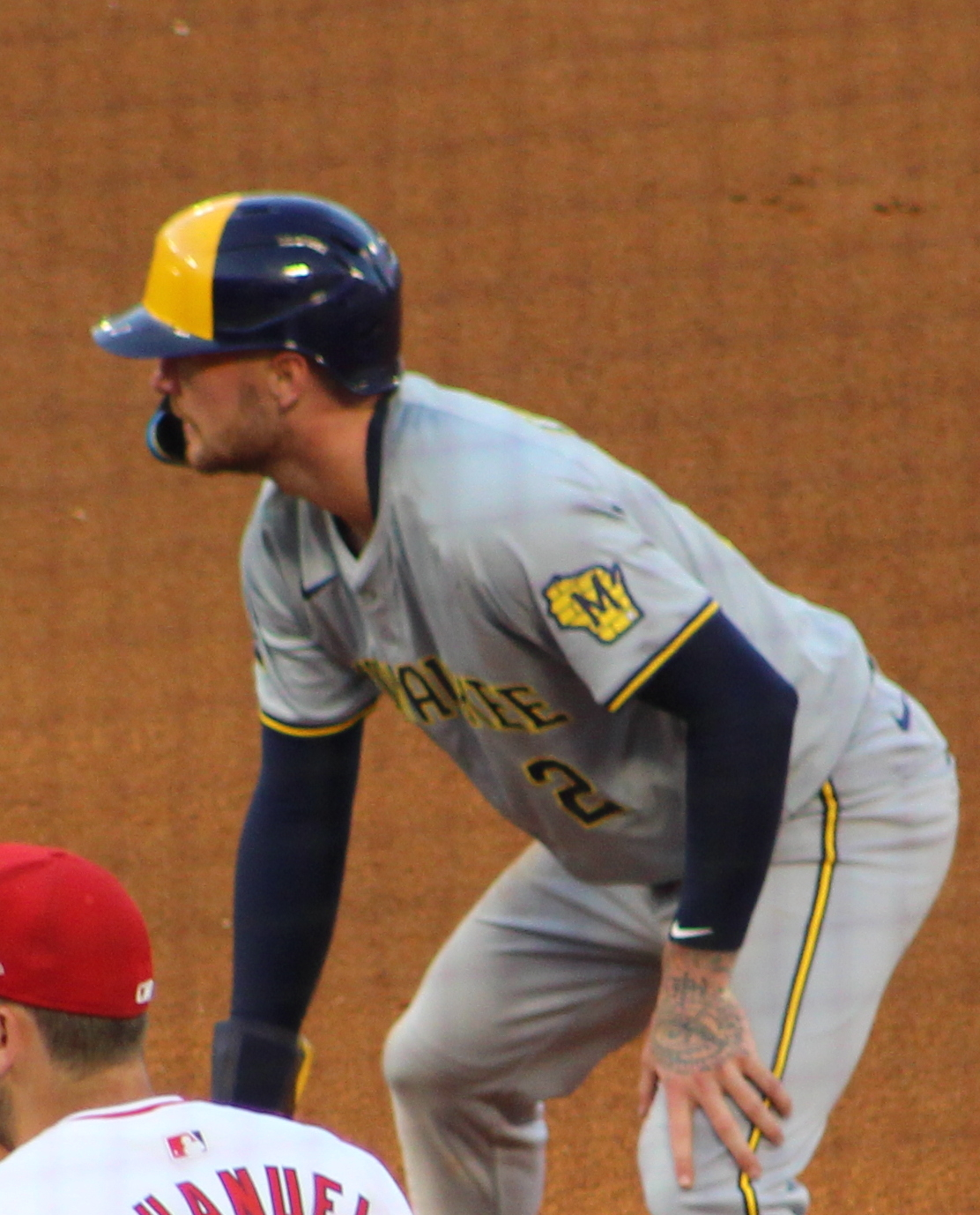
- Turang with the Milwaukee Brewers in 2024

Milwaukee Brewers – No. 2
- Second baseman
- Born: November 21, 1999 (age 26); Corona, California, U.S.
- Bats: Left Throws: Right

MLB debut
- March 30, 2023, for the Milwaukee Brewers

MLB statistics (through 2026 season)
- Batting average: .260
- Home runs: 52
- Runs batted in: 272
- Stolen bases: 119
- Stats at Baseball Reference

Teams
- Milwaukee Brewers (2023–present)

Career highlights and awards
- World Series champion (2026); All-MLB First Team (2026); 2× Gold Glove Award (2024, 2026)
Medals
Men's baseball
Representing the United States
World Baseball Classic
Silver medal – second place	2026 Miami	Team
15U Baseball World Cup
Silver medal – second place	2014 Mazatlán	Team
U-18 Baseball World Cup
Gold medal – first place	2017 Thunder Bay	Team

Brice Craig Turang (born November 21, 1999) is an American professional baseball second baseman for the Milwaukee Brewers of Major League Baseball (MLB). The Brewers selected Turang in the first round, with the 21st overall selection, of the 2018 MLB draft. He made his MLB debut in 2023 and won a Gold Glove Award and Platinum Glove Award in 2024. He went on to win the 2026 World Series with the team.

== Amateur career ==
Turang attended Santiago High School in Corona, California. MaxPreps named Turang the national freshman of the year after he hit .475 with two home runs and 27 runs batted in (RBIs). He also won USA Baseball's Richard W. "Dick" Case Award for his play on the national under-15 team. As a junior in 2017, he hit .465 and struck out only once in 101 at bats. In 2018, as a senior, he batted .352 with five home runs and 21 RBIs. Turang committed to play college baseball at Louisiana State University.

== Professional career ==
The Milwaukee Brewers selected Turang in the first round, with the 21st overall selection, of the 2018 Major League Baseball draft. He signed for a $3.4 million signing bonus and was assigned to the Arizona League Brewers before being promoted to the Helena Brewers in August. In 42 games between the two clubs, Turang batted .283 with one home run, 18 RBI, and 14 stolen bases.

Turang began 2019 with the Wisconsin Timber Rattlers, earning Midwest League All-Star honors. After slashing .287/.384/.376 with two home runs, 31 RBI, and 21 stolen bases over 82 games with Wisconsin, he was promoted to the Carolina Mudcats in July. Over 47 games with Carolina, he batted .200 with one home run, six RBI, and nine stolen bases.

With the 2020 minor league season cancelled due to the COVID-19 pandemic, Turang trained at the Brewers' alternate site in Appleton, Wisconsin. He started 2021 with the Biloxi Shuckers and was promoted to the Nashville Sounds in early August. Over 117 games between the two clubs, Turang slashed .258/.347/.362 with six home runs, 53 RBI, and 20 stolen bases. In 2022, Turang played for the Triple-A Nashville, where he slashed .286/.360/.412 with 13 home runs, 78 RBI and 34 stolen bases. On November 15, 2022, the Brewers added Turang to their 40–man roster to protect him from the Rule 5 draft.

=== Milwaukee Brewers ===
==== 2023 ====
On March 27, 2023, the Brewers announced that Turang had made the Opening Day roster. Turang started against the Chicago Cubs, batting ninth and playing second base, going 1-for-3. On April 2, Turang hit his first double, also driving in Rowdy Tellez for his first major league RBI. During the team's home opener against the New York Mets the following day, Turang hit his first career home run, a grand slam off of Tommy Hunter. He finished his rookie season batting .218 with six home runs and 26 stolen bases in 448 plate appearances, but his defense at second base was above average, according to several advanced metrics. Turang started both games of the National League Wild Card Series against the Arizona Diamondbacks, going 0-for-3 with one walk.

==== 2024 ====
In 2024, Turang batted .254/.316/.349 with seven home runs and 57 RBI in 619 plate appearances. He ranked third in the majors with 50 stolen bases. He had the lowest pull percentage of all major league batters, at 26.4 percent. Turang fared better in his second postseason, batting 5-for-11 with two stolen bases as the Brewers again lost in the Wild Card Series. He won the Platinum Glove Award, given to the league's best fielder, and a Gold Glove at second base.

==== 2025 ====
In 2025, Turang's offense improved after he adjusted his batting stance, grip and increased his bat speed. He was named the National League Player of the Month for August. Turang was the first Brewers player to receive the honor since Christian Yelich in 2018. In his third season with Milwaukee, he batted .288/.359/435 with 18 home runs and 81 RBI in 156 games, all career bests.

In the decisive Game 5 of the NLDS against the Chicago Cubs, Turang hit a key home run in the 7th inning to clinch a 3-1 win, secure a series win and make an NLCS appearance. In Game 1 of the NLCS, he gave up a potential game-tying run by "dodging" a Los Angeles Dodgers fastball that would have hit him. Turang addressed his response on the play as "a natural reaction"; nevertheless, after swinging at a high fastball he would be the final out as the Brewers lost 2–1, leaving three runners on base stranded. They were eventually swept in the series.

==== 2026 ====
Prior to the 2026 season, Turang was selected to represent the United States in the 2026 World Baseball Classic. In 6 games for team USA, Turang slashed .364/.391/.545 with 5 RBIs and 2 steals, as team USA earned a silver medal in the tournament. For his performance, Turang was selected to the all-tournament team. Turang's success continued during the 2026 regular season, as he slashed .268/.366/.450 with 21 home runs and 100 RBIs, the latter a Brewers single-season record for a second baseman. On May 10, Turang hit a walk-off home run on Mother's Day to defeat the Yankees 4–3, his first career walk-off home run. This came 20 years after Bill Hall (who also wore no. 2) hit a walk-off home run on Mother's Day in 2006. Turang and the Brewers enjoyed a franchise record 103-win regular season, and entered the playoffs with home field advantage. In 13 postseason games, Turang slashed .261/.404/.413 with 9 runs scored and 4 RBIs.

In Game 1 of the NLCS against the Los Angeles Dodgers, Turang hit a home run off Tarik Skubal to tie the game in the fourth inning. The Brewers won the game 2–1 and went on to sweep the Dodgers in a reversal of the previous season's NLCS result. Turang and the Brewers advanced to the World Series to face the Tampa Bay Rays. In Game 3, Turang had 3 hits, including a 2 RBI single with two outs in the fifth inning, the first two runs of an eight-run inning for the Brewers, who went on to win 10–1 and take a 3–0 lead in the series. In Game 5, Turang had two hits, including his third double of the series, and threw out Richie Palacios for the final out, securing a 4–1 victory for the Brewers to win their first championship in franchise history and giving him his first-career championship. Turang would hit .316 in the Series, with 3 doubles, 3 runs scored, 2 RBIs, and a stolen base.

On November 2, Turang was named a finalist for the National League Most Valuable Player Award alongside Pete Crow-Armstrong and Shohei Ohtani.

== Personal life ==
Turang's father, Brian Turang, played in two MLB seasons for the Seattle Mariners. His mother, Carrie, played twice in the Women's College World Series (WCWS) for Long Beach State. He has four sisters who also played collegiate sports. His sister Brianna played in the WCWS three times for Oklahoma and is married to National Football League punter Tress Way. His sister Carissa played softball at Southern Miss and Cal State Fullerton and soccer at Oklahoma City University. Another sister, Cabria, played soccer at Utah. His sister Bailee played volleyball at Southern Nazarene University.

Turang is a Christian.

Awards
Preceded by Kyle Stowers	National League Player of the Month; August 2025	Succeeded by Daylen Lile
