= Peter Strzelecki =

American baseball player (born 1994)

Free agent
- Pitcher
- Born: October 24, 1994 (age 32); Queens, New York, U.S.
- Bats: Right Throws: Right

MLB debut
- June 2, 2022, for the Milwaukee Brewers

MLB statistics (through 2026 season)
- Win–loss record: 6–7
- Earned run average: 3.78
- Strikeouts: 94
- Stats at Baseball Reference

Teams
- Milwaukee Brewers (2022–2023); Arizona Diamondbacks (2023); Cleveland Guardians (2024); St. Louis Cardinals (2026)

Peter Joseph Strzelecki (/strɛzˈlɛkiː/ strez-LEH-kee; born October 24, 1994) is an American professional baseball pitcher who is a free agent. He has previously played in Major League Baseball (MLB) for the Milwaukee Brewers, Arizona Diamondbacks, Cleveland Guardians, and St. Louis Cardinals.

== Career ==
=== Amateur career ===
Strzelecki graduated from Santaluces Community High School in Lantana, Florida. He attended Palm Beach State College, where he played college baseball in 2014 and 2015. He transferred to the University of South Florida to play for the South Florida Bulls.

=== Milwaukee Brewers ===
The Milwaukee Brewers signed Strzelecki as an undrafted free agent after the 2018 Major League Baseball draft. In his first professional season, he played for the Arizona League Brewers and the Helena Brewers while pitching to a cumulative 5.52 earned run average (ERA) in 27 1/3 innings pitched. He played for the Wisconsin Timber Rattlers and the Carolina Mudcats in 2019 and recorded a 3.05 ERA in 59 innings.

He did not play a minor league game in 2020 as the season was cancelled due to the COVID-19 pandemic. Returning for the 2021 minor league season, he pitched for the Biloxi Shuckers and the Nashville Sounds. Between the two teams, he pitched in 40 games and went 0–2 with a 3.46 ERA.

He began the 2022 season with Nashville before having his contract selected to the major league roster by the Brewers on May 30, 2022. He made his MLB debut on June 2. On October 4, Strzelecki earned his first career save after tossing a scoreless ninth inning in a game against the Arizona Diamondbacks.

=== Arizona Diamondbacks ===
On August 1, 2023, Strzelecki was traded to the Arizona Diamondbacks in exchange for pitcher Andrew Chafin. He made one appearance for the Diamondbacks down the stretch, pitching a scoreless 1 1/3 innings against the San Diego Padres. Strzelecki was optioned to the Triple–A Reno Aces to begin the 2024 season. However, he was designated for assignment by the team on March 25, 2024, following the promotion of Tucker Barnhart.

=== Cleveland Guardians ===
On March 28, 2024, Strzelecki was traded to the Cleveland Guardians in exchange for cash considerations. In 10 appearances for the Guardians, he recorded a 2.31 ERA with 9 strikeouts across 11 2/3 innings pitched. Strzelecki was designated for assignment by Cleveland on November 19.

=== Pittsburgh Pirates ===
On November 22, 2024, the Guardians traded Strzelecki to the Pittsburgh Pirates in exchange for cash considerations. On March 27, 2025, Strzelecki was designated for assignment by the Pirates. He cleared waivers and was sent outright to the Triple-A Indianapolis Indians on March 29. In 16 appearances (one start) for the Indians, Strzelecki struggled to a 2-2 record and 9.90 ERA with 15 strikeouts over 20 innings of work. Strzelecki was released by the Pirates organization on July 1.

=== Tampa Bay Rays ===
On July 6, 2025, Strzelecki signed a minor league contract with the Tampa Bay Rays. He made two appearances for the Triple-A Durham Bulls, recording a 4.50 ERA with three strikeouts over two innings of work. Strzelecki was released by the Rays organization on September 3.

=== Milwaukee Brewers (second stint) ===
On February 9, 2026, Strzelecki signed a minor league contract with the Milwaukee Brewers. On May 16, the Brewers selected Strzelecki's contract, adding him to their active roster. He failed to make an appearance for the team prior to being designated the following day. On May 20, Strzelecki elected free agency after clearing waivers.

=== New York Yankees ===
On May 23, 2026, Strzelecki signed a minor league contract with the New York Yankees. In six appearances for the Triple-A Scranton/Wilkes-Barre RailRiders, he recorded a 7.71 ERA with nine strikeouts across 4 2/3 innings pitched. On June 18, Strzelecki was released by the Yankees after exercising the opt-out clause in his contract.

=== Milwaukee Brewers (third stint) ===
On June 23, 2026, Strzelecki signed a minor league contract with the Milwaukee Brewers. Across 23 total appearances (including one start) for the Triple-A Nashville Sounds, he posted an 0–1 record and 3.42 ERA with 28 strikeouts and three saves across 26 1/3 innings pitched. On July 22, Strzelecki opted out of his contract and became a free agent.

=== St. Louis Cardinals ===
On July 25, 2026, Strzelecki signed a minor league contract with the St. Louis Cardinals. He made one scoreless appearance for the Single–A Palm Beach Cardinals, recording one strikeout. On July 28, the Cardinals selected Strzelecki's contract, adding him to their active roster. He pitched 14 innings with the Cardinals and had a 5.79 ERA and eight strikeouts. The Cardinals designated Strzelecki for assignment on September 16. He elected free agency after clearing waivers two days later.

== Personal life ==
Strzelecki grew up in Boynton Beach, Florida with two brothers and one sister. He started playing baseball at a young age and later on became a dual sport athlete playing high school basketball and football as well.

While Strzelecki was pitching at South Florida, his father, Kevin, died of a heart attack at age 52.
