= Rowdy Tellez =

American baseball player (born 1995)

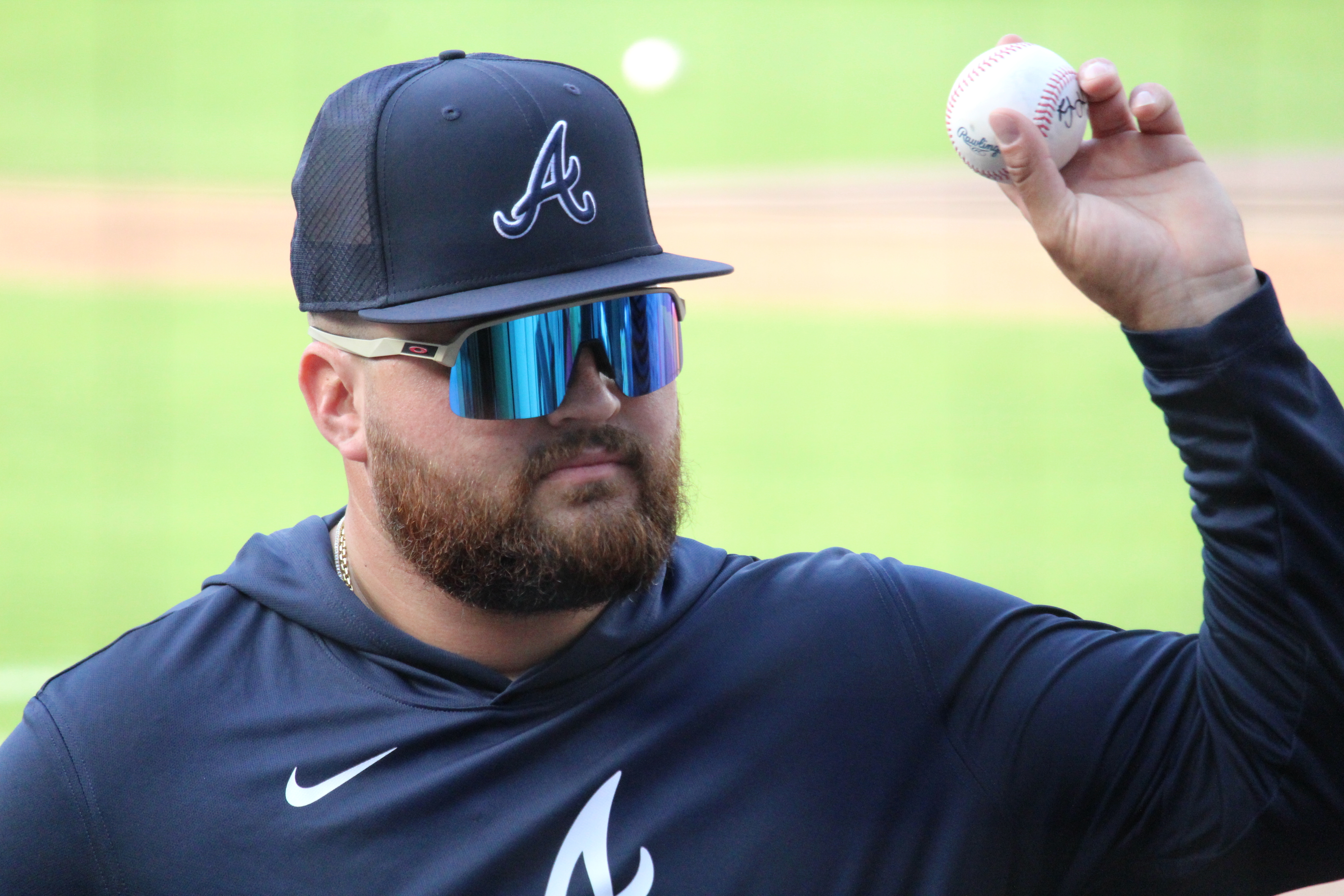
- Tellez with the Atlanta Braves in 2026

Tohoku Rakuten Golden Eagles
- First baseman
- Born: March 16, 1995 (age 31); Sacramento, California, U.S.
- Bats: Left Throws: Left

MLB debut
- September 5, 2018, for the Toronto Blue Jays

MLB statistics (through 2026 season)
- Batting average: .234
- Home runs: 123
- Runs batted in: 372
- Stats at Baseball Reference

Teams
- Toronto Blue Jays (2018–2021); Milwaukee Brewers (2021–2023); Pittsburgh Pirates (2024); Seattle Mariners (2025); Texas Rangers (2025); Atlanta Braves (2026)
Medals
Men's baseball
Representing Mexico
World Baseball Classic
Bronze medal – third place	2023 Miami	Team

Ryan John "Rowdy" Tellez (/təˈlɛz/ tə-LEZ; born March 16, 1995) is an American professional baseball first baseman for the Tohoku Rakuten Golden Eagles of Nippon Professional Baseball (NPB). He has previously played in Major League Baseball (MLB) for the Toronto Blue Jays, Milwaukee Brewers, Pittsburgh Pirates, Seattle Mariners, Texas Rangers, and Atlanta Braves. He has also played for the Mexico national baseball team in 2023 and 2026.

In 2013, Tellez was both a Baseball America and a Rawlings High School All-American. The Blue Jays drafted him in the 30th round of the 2013 MLB draft, and he made his MLB debut with Toronto in 2018.

He is the only player since 1913 to hit seven doubles in his first seven major league games. Toronto traded him to Milwaukee during the 2021 season. In 2022 he had career-highs of 35 home runs and 89 RBIs. He signed as a free agent with Pittsburgh before the 2024 season, then with Seattle and Texas in 2025, and with Atlanta in 2026.

== Early life ==
Tellez, born in Sacramento, California, is the eldest child of Greg and Lori (née Bernick) Tellez; his mother is Jewish, and his father is of Mexican heritage. Concerning his nickname, his father said,

"We didn't know the sex and we didn't want to know, and we stayed away from calling him 'Baby' or 'It.' But he was so active in there, moving around all of the time in the womb, that we ended up calling him 'Baby Rowdy', and it stuck. Now he's just 'Rowdy', and that's how everybody knows him."

== High school ==
Tellez attended Elk Grove High School, in Elk Grove, California. He was teammates with fellow future MLB players J. D. Davis, Dom Núñez, Derek Hill, Nick Madrigal, and Dylan Carlson. Tellez was a 2013 Baseball America High School All-American, 2013 Rawlings First Team All-American, and 2013 Rawlings/Perfect Game All-Region First Team – California. He accepted a scholarship offer to play baseball for the University of Southern California (USC).

== Professional career ==
=== Toronto Blue Jays ===
==== 2013–15 ====
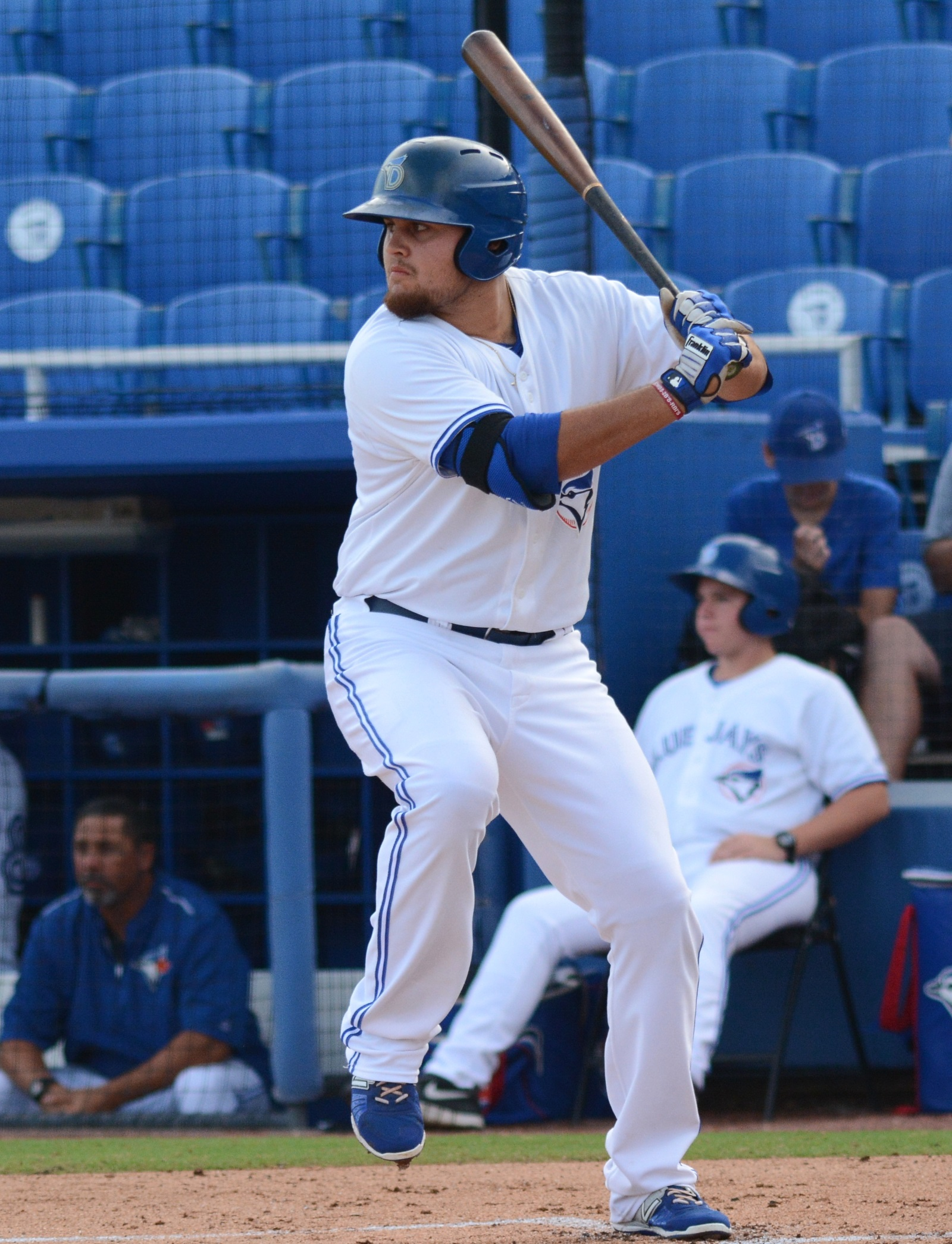
Tellez batting for the Dunedin Blue Jays in 2015.

The Toronto Blue Jays drafted Tellez in the 30th round of the 2013 Major League Baseball draft. Entering the draft, Tellez was ranked as the 59th-best player available by Baseball America, but he was passed over by every team many times due to his commitment to USC. He signed with the Blue Jays for an $850,000 signing bonus, which at the time was the most ever paid to a post-10th-round pick, following new draft signing rules enacted two years prior.

Tellez was assigned to the Rookie-level Gulf Coast League Blue Jays for rest of 2013, and batted .234 with two home runs and 20 runs batted in (RBIs) in 34 games. Baseball America rated him the best power hitter in the Blue Jays minor league organization.

He played most of the 2014 season with the Bluefield Blue Jays of the Appalachian League and earned a late-season promotion to the Single-A Lansing Lugnuts of the Midwest League. In total, Tellez played 65 games in 2014, and batted .305/.375/.438 in 233 at bats with six home runs and 43 RBI.

Tellez opened the 2015 season with Lansing, and was Midwest League Player of the Week for the week ended May 18. He was named a Midwest League midseason All-Star. At that time, he led the league in RBI, with 41. Tellez was promoted to the Dunedin Blue Jays of the High-A Florida State League in late June and hit three home runs in his first four games with the team, earning a spot on MLBPipeline's Prospect Team of the Week and being named Florida State League Player of the Week for the week ended June 29. He ended the 2015 season on the disabled list. Tellez set several career-highs in 2015, playing in 103 games and batting .289/.347/.454 in 401 at bats with 24 doubles,14 home runs, and 77 RBIs.

After the season, he played 21 games with the Salt River Rafters of the Arizona Fall League, batting .293/.352/.488 and leading the team with four home runs and 17 RBIs. He was named to the AFL All-Prospect Team, and AFL Rising Stars.

==== 2016–18 ====
Tellez was invited to Major League spring training in 2016. He was assigned to the Double-A New Hampshire Fisher Cats to open the 2016 season. Tellez was named an Eastern League mid-season and full-season All-Star. Tellez had a stellar 2016 season, posting new career bests in almost every offensive category. In 124 games, he hit .297 (10th in the Eastern League) with a .389 on-base percentage (2nd), .530 slugging percentage (3rd), 23 home runs (4th), 63 walks (4th), 81 RBIs (6th), 71 runs (6th), and 29 doubles (tied for 8th). He was named an MiLB.com Toronto Blue Jays Organization All-Star, and a Baseball America Double-A All-Star.

Heading into the 2017 season, Tellez was named the sixth-best first base prospect by MLB and Toronto's 5th-best prospect by MLB Pipeline. In spring training, Jays manager John Gibbons said Tellez was the prospect closest to being ready for the major leagues. Tellez was assigned to the Triple-A Buffalo Bisons in late March. In his first game for the Bisons, he hit two home runs to lead the team to a 4–2 victory over the Scranton/Wilkes-Barre RailRiders. From that point on, however, Tellez struggled in Triple-A. In 122 games, he hit .222 with six home runs and 56 RBI. On November 20, Tellez was added to Toronto's 40-man roster.

Tellez began the 2018 season playing again for the Bisons. He was ranked 29th on MLB's 2018 Top 30 Blue Jays prospects list. He played in 112 games and hit .270/.340/.425 with 13 home runs and 50 RBIs. On September 4, Tellez was called up by the Blue Jays, following the end of Buffalo's season.

==== 2018 ====
On September 5, 2018, Tellez made his Major League debut with the Blue Jays. In his first at bat, he hit a first-pitch, pinch-hit double against the Tampa Bay Rays.

In his first three games with Toronto, Tellez hit six doubles, becoming the first major league player since 1913 to do so. He was the first player since 1920 to debut with three consecutive doubles, and he was the first American League rookie since Joe DiMaggio in 1936 to hit six doubles in a three-game span. Tellez also tied the record set by Chris Dickerson in 2008 for the most extra-base hits in a player's first three games. Tellez then became the only player since 1913 to hit seven doubles in his first seven major league games. In his first 40 plate appearances he had 10 extra base hits, tying Taylor Teagarden for the most by any ballplayer since 1913.

In 23 games in September 2018, he batted .314/.329/.614 with Toronto. He hit 9 doubles, 4 home runs, and 14 RBIs in 73 plate appearances.

==== 2019 ====
Tellez made the Blue Jays' 2019 Opening Day roster.

On April 11, Tellez hit a home run deep into the right field bleachers at Fenway Park with a 115.2 mph exit velocity, the fastest for a Toronto Blue Jays home run in the Statcast era (since 2015), later surpassed by Vladimir Guerrero Jr. Tellez's home run was in the top 3 percent of the highest exit velocities hit by major leaguers in 2019.

The home run sparked a controversy. The automated Statcast telemetry broadcast a projected distance calculation of 505 feet. That would have established Tellez's homer as the longest home run ever hit in the history of Fenway Park, longer than that of the 502-foot record set by Hall of Famer Ted Williams on June 9, 1946—a spot commemorated in the stadium by a painted red seat. However, some commentators said that Tellez's home run landed short of the section where Ted Williams' home run had landed, while others said that the ball hit off the upper deck before coming straight down, and Statcast calculates how far the ball would have traveled had it been unobstructed. Rather than issue an updated mathematical projection, Major League Baseball pulled the distance down from the official leaderboard, leaving the distance column on the public Statcast site as "NaN" (Not a Number). Thus, Ted Williams' 1946 home run remained the distance record at Fenway Park.

On April 23, Tellez became the fifth-youngest Blue Jay of all time to hit a grand slam, at 24 years and 38 days. He became the first player in team history to hit 13 home runs in his first 65 major league games and 17 home runs in his first 85 games.

For the season with Toronto, Tellez batted .227/.293/.449 with 21 home runs and 51 RBIs in 409 plate appearances. Tellez became the third Blue Jays rookie to hit 21 or more home runs, joining Eric Hinske (24 in 2002) and J.P. Arencibia (23 in 2011).

Tellez also played 26 games with Buffalo in 2019, batting .366/.450/.688 with 7 home runs and 21 RBIs in 109 plate appearances.

==== 2020 ====
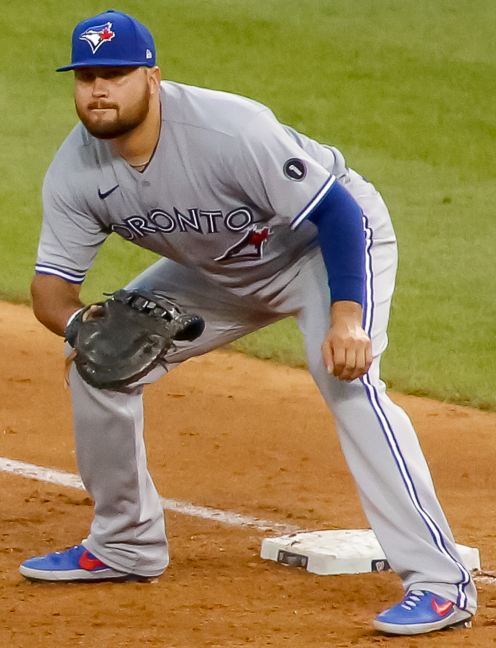
Tellez playing first base in 2020.

In the COVID-19-shortened 2020 season, Tellez batted .283/.346/.540. He hit eight home runs and 23 RBIs, with 20 strikeouts in 127 plate appearances, and on defense he played error-free baseball.

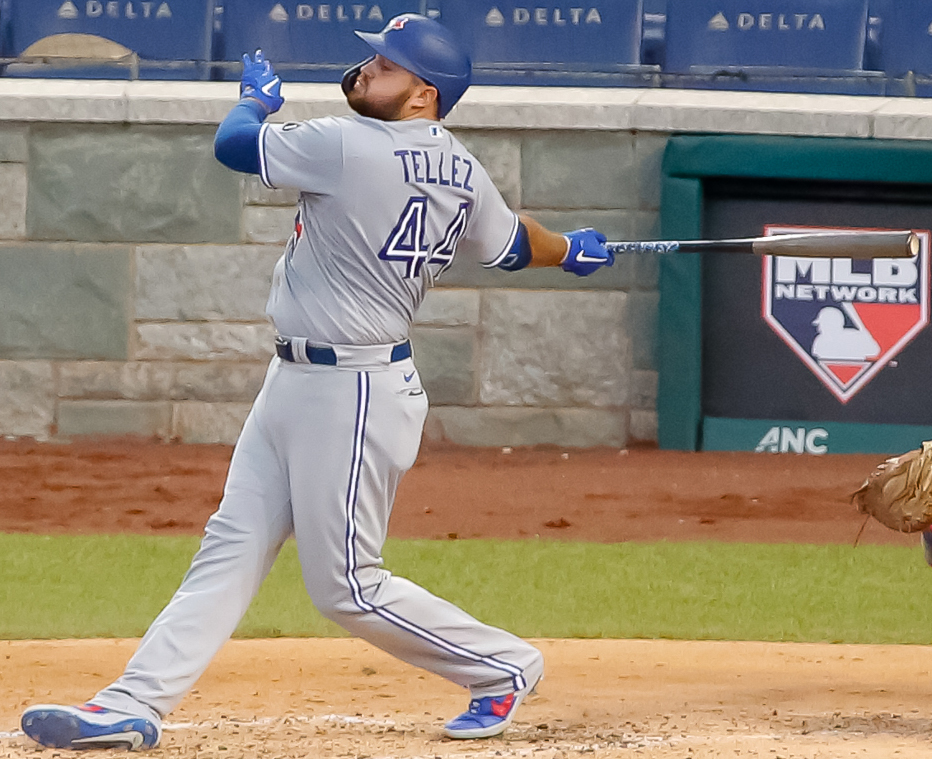
Tellez hitting in 2020.

His strikeout rate decreased 12.7 percentage points from 2019, the greatest decrease among major league hitters. Tellez drove in a run every 4.91 at bats, the 10th-best rate in the AL.

On August 20, he hit a 429-foot home run that had an exit velocity of 117.4 mph. It was the highest exit velocity for a home run by a Blue Jay in the Statcast era (since 2015), and the third-highest exit velocity of any batted ball for all major leaguers in 2020, behind Pete Alonso (118.4) and Gary Sanchez (117.5).

==== 2021 ====
Tellez was the Blue Jays' Opening Day designated hitter, but struggled at the plate, batting .209 with 4 home runs in 50 games for Toronto to start the season. He was demoted to Triple-A in mid-June. There, playing for Buffalo he batted .298/.400/.638 with 4 home runs and 11 RBIs in 55 plate appearances.

=== Milwaukee Brewers (2021–23) ===
==== 2021 ====
On July 6, 2021, Tellez was traded to the Milwaukee Brewers for pitchers Trevor Richards and Bowden Francis.

In the 2021 regular season for the Brewers, Tellez batted .272/.333/.481. He hit 10 doubles, seven home runs, and 28 RBIs in 174 plate appearances.

Tellez hit a two-run home run in Game 1 of the 2021 National League Division Series off Charlie Morton, driving in the Brewers' only runs in a 2–1 win over the Atlanta Braves. He hit another two-run home run in Game 4, but the Brewers lost that game and the series to Atlanta, the eventual World Series champion. Those two home runs were his only hits in 10 at bats in the playoffs.

==== 2022 ====
On May 4, 2022, Tellez set a Brewers record with eight RBIs in one game, hitting two home runs, a double, and a single in an 18–4 win over the Cincinnati Reds. On May 8, Tellez received the NL Player of the Week Award.

In 2022 he batted .219/.306/.461 in 599 plate appearances, with 35 home runs (5th in the NL), 89 RBIs, 9 intentional walks (4th), and 15.1 at bats per home run (3rd). His highest exit velocity was 116.9 mph, 7th-highest in major league baseball. On defense, his .998 fielding percentage was second-best among NL first basemen, and the best in franchise history.

==== 2023 ====
On January 13, 2023, Tellez agreed to a one-year, $4.95 million contract with the Brewers, avoiding salary arbitration. His season started well, batting .244/.330/.500 with 12 home runs through June 1. However, his production declined, with only one home run the rest of the season. He spent six weeks on the injured list, first with right forearm inflammation and then with a torn fingernail and fractured left ring finger that required 17 stitches. He pitched a scoreless ninth inning to close out a 16–1 win over the Miami Marlins on September 22, which clinched a postseason berth for the Brewers. He did not play in the postseason.

In the 2023 regular season he batted .215/.291/.376 in 351 plate appearances with 13 home runs and 47 RBIs. His maximum exit velocity was 114.8 mph, in the top 6 percent of major league batters for the fifth year in a row. He played 76 games at first base, 20 at DH, and one as a pitcher. Tellez was non-tendered and became a free agent on November 17.

=== Pittsburgh Pirates (2024) ===
On December 15, 2023, Tellez signed a one-year, $3.2 million contract with the Pittsburgh Pirates with incentives that could increase his salary up to $4 million.

He played in 131 games for the Pirates in 2024, slashing .243/.299/.392 with 13 home runs and 56 RBIs over 421 plate appearances, with a maximum exit velocity of 115.5 mph, the 20th-highest in the majors for the year. His .998 fielding percentage was second-highest among MLB first basemen. He excelled in the clutch, batting .302/.361/.547 in games that were late and close and .351/.415/.460 when there were two outs and runners in scoring position.

Tellez was designated for assignment by Pittsburgh on September 24 and released the next day. At the time, he was four plate appearances away from receiving a $200,000 bonus for reaching 425 plate appearances in the season. He had batted .299 in July and August combined.

=== Seattle Mariners (2025) ===
On February 20, 2025, Tellez signed a minor league contract with the Seattle Mariners that included an invitation to spring training. On March 25, the Mariners selected Tellez's contract after he made the team's Opening Day roster. He hit a home run in three consecutive games from April 18 to April 20 against his former team, the Toronto Blue Jays. It was the longest such streak in his career. In 62 games for Seattle, Tellez batted .208/.249/.434 with 11 home runs and 27 RBI. On June 20, the Mariners designated Tellez for assignment. Seattle released him on June 26.

=== Texas Rangers (2025) ===
On July 5, 2025, Tellez signed a minor league contract with the Texas Rangers. He was assigned to the Round Rock Express, where he played four games, batting .333/.375/.800 with one double, 2 home runs, and 4 RBIs in 16 plate appearances. On July 18, he was called up to the Rangers’ major league roster to start play after the All-Star break. Tellez batted .259/.315/.457 with Texas, with 6 home runs and 22 RBIs in 50 games.

=== Atlanta Braves (2026) ===
On March 20, 2026, Tellez signed a minor league contract with the Atlanta Braves. He began the season with the Triple-A Gwinnett Stripers, slashing .259/.367/.483 with eight home runs, 33 RBI, and three stolen bases. On June 10, the Braves selected Tellez's contract, adding him to their active roster. In seven games for Atlanta, he batted .200/.273/.500 with one home run and four RBIs. On July 2, the Braves designated Tellez for assignment. He cleared waivers and elected free agency on July 4. On July 7, Tellez re-signed with Atlanta on a minor league contract. For the 2026 regular season with the Stripers, he batted . 267/.355/.466 in 356 at bats with 23 doubles, 16 home runs, and 67 RBIs.

On September 29, the Braves added Tellez to their active post-season roster.

=== Tohoku Rakuten Golden Eagles ===
On November 18, 2026, Tellez signed with the Tohoku Rakuten Golden Eagles of Nippon Professional Baseball.

== International career ==
Tellez played for Mexico in the 2023 World Baseball Classic (WBC) as a designated hitter, slashing .280/.333/.440 with one home run and five RBI. Tellez was also invited to play for Team Israel, as he and his mother were Jewish. He chose Mexico for various reasons, including logistical ones—the paperwork was all in order, and Mexico was in the pool that played in Phoenix, close to the Brewers’ spring training home, while Israel trained and played in Florida. Mexico had offered Tellez a spot on their 2017 WBC roster, but he declined, focusing on making the Blue Jays' major league roster.

Tellez returned to Mexico for the 2026 WBC, batting 1-for-9 with two walks.

== Personal life ==
Tellez's mother, Lori, was diagnosed with stage IV melanoma in late 2016 and later battled brain cancer. She died on August 18, 2018, just over two weeks before his major league debut.

Tellez is Jewish. By the end of 2022, he was third in career home run frequency among Jewish major leaguers, hitting a home run every 17.46 at bats, trailing Hall of Famer Hank Greenberg and All-Star Joc Pederson. By the end of 2025, his home run rate dropped to every 19.4 plate appearances, worse than MVP Ryan Braun.

Tellez is of Mexican descent through his father. His paternal grandfather, John, played baseball in Mexico and Colorado. Tellez has a sister.

Tellez started riding dirt bikes when he was three years old but, due to his size, switched to baseball when he was 10. He also enjoys hunting and fishing.

During one year in high school, teammate Derek Hill lived with Tellez's family.

Tellez served as the officiant at former Toronto teammate Danny Jansen’s wedding in 2022.

== See also ==
- List of Jewish Major League Baseball players
- List of Jews in sports
