= Ozzie Timmons =

American baseball player and coach (born 1970)

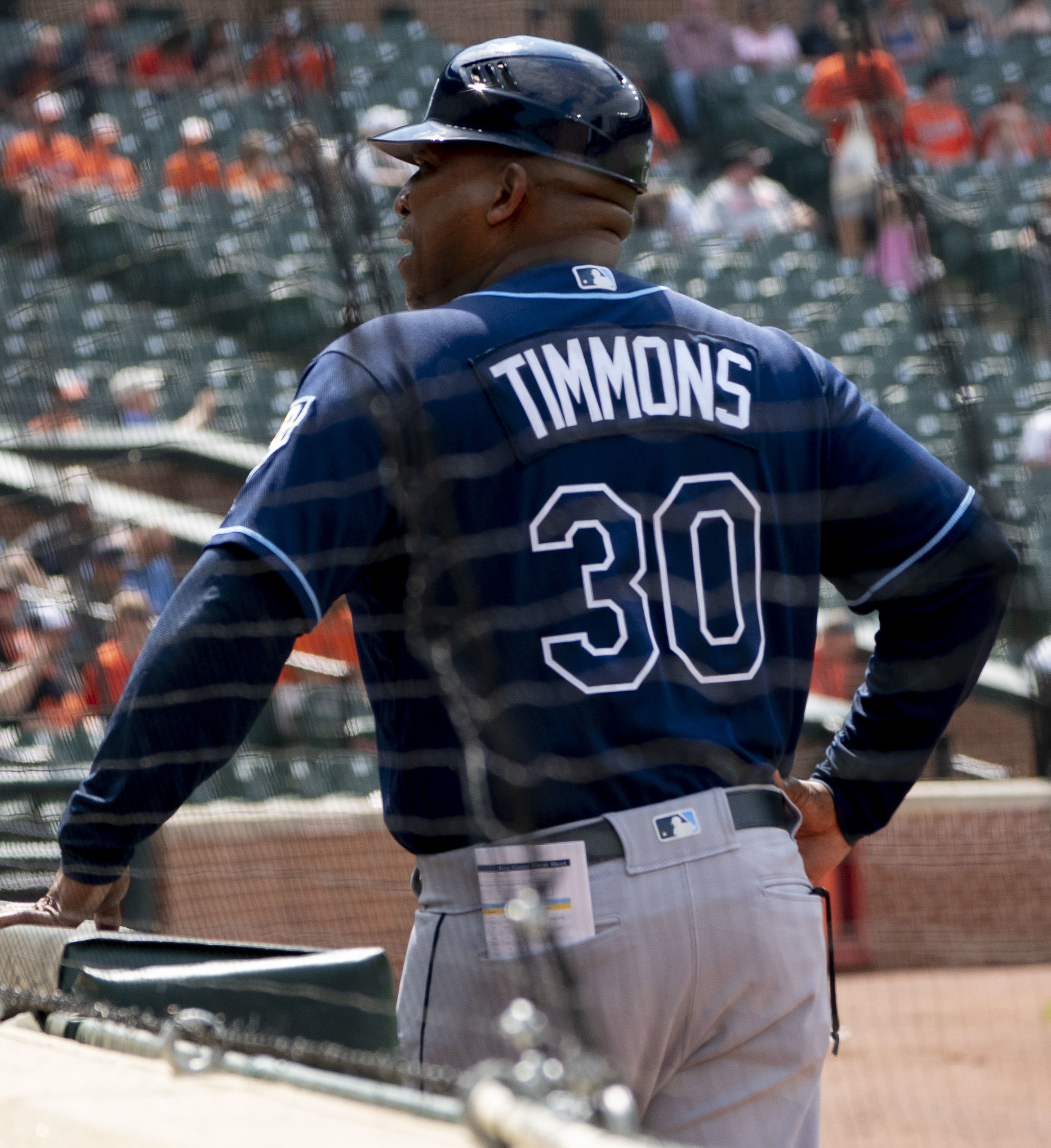
- Timmons with the Tampa Bay Rays

Tampa Bay Rays – No. 30
- Outfielder / Hitting coach
- Born: September 18, 1970 (age 56); Tampa, Florida, U.S.
- Batted: Right Threw: Right

Professional debut
- MLB: April 26, 1995, for the Chicago Cubs
- NPB: March 30, 2001, for the Chunichi Dragons

Last appearance
- MLB: October 1, 2000, for the Tampa Bay Devil Rays
- NPB: September 8, 2001, for the Chunichi Dragons

MLB statistics
- Batting average: .235
- Home runs: 20
- Runs batted in: 60

NPB statistics
- Batting average: .228
- Home runs: 12
- Runs batted in: 45
- Stats at Baseball Reference

Teams
- As player: Chicago Cubs (1995–1996); Cincinnati Reds (1997); Seattle Mariners (1999); Tampa Bay Devil Rays (2000); Chunichi Dragons (2001); As coach: Tampa Bay Rays (2018–2021); Milwaukee Brewers (2022–2024); Tampa Bay Rays (2026–present)

Osborne Llewellyn Timmons (born September 18, 1970), is an American former professional baseball outfielder and current assistant hitting coach for the Tampa Bay Rays of Major League Baseball (MLB). He played in MLB from 1995 through 2000 for the Chicago Cubs, Cincinnati Reds, Seattle Mariners, and Tampa Bay Devil Rays. He also played in Nippon Professional Baseball (NPB) in 2001 for the Chunichi Dragons.

== Playing career ==
Timmons attended Brandon High School in Brandon, Florida, and the University of Tampa, where he played college baseball for the Tampa Spartans. In 1990, he played collegiate summer baseball with the Falmouth Commodores of the Cape Cod Baseball League. He was selected by the Chicago Cubs in the fifth round of the 1991 MLB draft.

Timmons made his MLB debut with the Cubs on April 26, 1995. The Cubs traded Timmons and Jay Peterson to the Cincinnati Reds for Curt Lyons on March 31, 1997. He signed with the Seattle Mariners for the 1999 season, the Tampa Bay Devil Rays for the 2000 season, and was purchased by the Chunichi Dragons of Nippon Professional Baseball's Central League for the 2001 season.

== Coaching career ==
Timmons served as the hitting coach for the Tampa Bay Rays‘ Triple-A affiliate Durham Bulls, prior to being promoted to the parent-club Rays, as their first base coach, for the 2018 season.

After the 2021 season, the Milwaukee Brewers hired Timmons and Connor Dawson as their hitting coaches. On October 21, 2024, Brewers executive Matt Arnold stated that Timmons would not return for the 2025 season.

On January 22, 2025, Timmons returned to the Rays organization under the role of special assistant, coaching development. On November 3, Timmons was hired by the Rays as their assistant hitting coach.
