= 2023 Pittsburgh Pirates season =

2023 Pittsburgh Pirates
- League: National League
- Division: Central
- Ballpark: PNC Park
- City: Pittsburgh, Pennsylvania (Note: From 1882–1906, the team played in Allegheny, Pennsylvania, which became annexed by Pittsburgh as the North Side in 1907.)
- Record: 76–86 (.469)
- Divisional place: 4th
- Owners: Bob Nutting
- General managers: Ben Cherington
- Managers: Derek Shelton
- Television: AT&T SportsNet Pittsburgh
- Radio: KDKA-FM; Pittsburgh Pirates Radio Network
- Stats: ESPN.com; Baseball Reference

The 2023 Pittsburgh Pirates season was the franchise's 142nd season overall, 137th season as a member of the National League, and 23rd season at PNC Park. The season was notable for the Pirates as it featured the return of Andrew McCutchen, who re-signed with the team after spending his first nine seasons with Pittsburgh before being traded following the 2017 season.

Despite starting with a record of 20–8, they would regress later in the season, enduring multiple losing streaks and going 56–78 the rest of the way, resulting in them failing to make the playoffs after a 7-year absence, or win the National League Central for the first time. The team however did improve upon their 62–100 record from the previous season and earned their best record since 2018.

The Pittsburgh Pirates drew an average home attendance of 20,131 in 81 home games in the 2023 MLB season, the 26th highest in the league. The total attendance was 1,630,624.

== Offseason ==
=== Rule changes ===
Pursuant to the CBA, new rule changes will be in place for the 2023 season:

- institution of a pitch clock between pitches;
- limits on pickoff attempts per plate appearance;
- limits on defensive shifts requiring two infielders to be on either side of second and be within the boundary of the infield; and
- larger bases (increased to 18-inch squares);

== Regular season ==
=== Game log ===
Legend
	Pirates win
	Pirates loss
	Postponement
	Eliminated from playoff race
**Bold**	Pirates team member

2023 Game Log: 76–86 (Home: 39–42; Away: 37–44)
March/April: 20–9 (Home: 9–4; Away: 11–5)

#	Date	Opponent	Score	Win	Loss	Save	Attendance	Record	Streak
1	March 30	@ Reds	5–4	**Zastryzny** (1–0)	Farmer (0–1)	**Bednar** (1)	44,063	1–0	W1
2	April 1	@ Reds	2–6	Lodolo (1–0)	**Hill** (0–1)	—	22,224	1–1	L1
3	April 2	@ Reds	1–3	Ashcraft (1–0)	**Velasquez** (0–1)	Díaz (1)	14,421	1–2	L2
4	April 3	@ Red Sox	7–6	**Underwood Jr.** (1–0)	Crawford (0–1)	**Bednar** (2)	28,369	2–2	W1
5	April 4	@ Red Sox	4–1	**Contreras** (1–0)	Pivetta (0–1)	**Bednar** (3)	28,842	3–2	W2
6	April 5	@ Red Sox	4–1	**Keller** (1–0)	Kluber (0–2)	**Underwood Jr.** (1)	24,477	4–2	W3
7	April 7	White Sox	13–9	**Moreta** (1–0)	Diekman (0–1)	**Crowe** (1)	39,167	5–2	W4
8	April 8	White Sox	5–11	Clevinger (2–0)	**Velasquez** (0–2)	—	21,162	5–3	L1
9	April 9	White Sox	1–0	**Oviedo** (1–0)	Kopech (0–2)	**Bednar** (4)	10,571	6–3	W1
10	April 10	Astros	2–8	Valdez (1–1)	**Contreras** (1–1)	—	10,222	6–4	L1
11	April 11	Astros	7–4	**Bednar** (1–0)	Pressly (0–2)	—	9,996	7–4	W1
12	April 12	Astros	0–7	Urquidy (1–0)	**Hill** (0–2)	—	10,064	7–5	L1
13	April 13	@ Cardinals	5–0	**Velasquez** (1–2)	Montgomery (2–1)	—	37,805	8–5	W1
14	April 14	@ Cardinals	0–3	Thompson (1–0)	**Oviedo** (1–1)	Gallegos (1)	40,637	8–6	L1
15	April 15	@ Cardinals	6–3 (10)	**Bednar** (2–0)	Hicks (0–1)	**Moreta** (1)	40,042	9–6	W1
16	April 16	@ Cardinals	4–5 (10)	VerHagen (1–0)	**Crowe** (0–1)	—	40,346	9–7	L1
17	April 17	@ Rockies	14–3	**Hill** (1–2)	Freeland (2–1)	—	20,322	10–7	W1
18	April 18	@ Rockies	5–3	**Velasquez** (2–2)	Ureña (0–3)	**Bednar** (5)	19,495	11–7	W2
19	April 19	@ Rockies	14–3	**Oviedo** (2–1)	Gomber (0–4)	—	18,511	12–7	W3
20	April 20	Reds	4–3	**Contreras** (2–1)	Weaver (0–1)	**Bednar** (6)	14,051	13–7	W4
21	April 21	Reds	4–2	**Keller** (2–0)	Law (0–3)	**Bednar** (7)	17,276	14–7	W5
22	April 22	Reds	2–1	**Hill** (2–2)	Cessa (0–3)	**Underwood Jr.** (2)	12,575	15–7	W6
23	April 23	Reds	2–0	**Velasquez** (3–2)	Greene (0–1)	**Bednar** (8)	11,372	16–7	W7
24	April 25	Dodgers	7–8	Almonte (2–0)	**Holderman** (0–1)	Miller (1)	10,560	16–8	L1
25	April 26	Dodgers	8–1	**Contreras** (3–1)	Bickford (0–1)	—	12,152	17–8	W1
26	April 27	Dodgers	6–2	**Keller** (3–0)	Urías (3–3)	—	15,879	18–8	W2
—	April 28	@ Nationals	Postponed (rain); Makeup: April 29						
27	April 29 (1)	@ Nationals	6–3	**Hill** (3–2)	Corbin (1–4)	**Bednar** (9)	22,090	19–8	W3
28	April 29 (2)	@ Nationals	16–1	**Velasquez** (4–2)	Kuhl (0–2)	—	17,482	20–8	W4
29	April 30	@ Nationals	2–7	Gray (2–4)	**Oviedo** (2–2)	—	16,898	20–9	L1

May: 8–18 (Home: 3–9; Away: 5–9)

#	Date	Opponent	Score	Win	Loss	Save	Attendance	Record	Streak
30	May 2	@ Rays	1–4	Poche (3–0)	**Contreras** (3–2)	Adam (1)	10,325	20–10	L2
31	May 3	@ Rays	1–8	McClanahan (6–0)	**Keller** (3–1)	Anderson (1)	15,247	20–11	L3
32	May 4	@ Rays	2–3	Eflin (4–0)	**Velasquez** (4–3)	Adam (2)	12,148	20–12	L4
33	May 5	Blue Jays	0–4	Bassitt (4–2)	**Hill** (3–3)	—	24,810	20–13	L5
34	May 6	Blue Jays	2–8	Berríos (3–3)	**Oviedo** (2–3)	—	34,882	20–14	L6
35	May 7	Blue Jays	1–10	Kikuchi (5–0)	**Contreras** (3–3)	—	21,655	20–15	L7
36	May 8	Rockies	2–0	**Keller** (4–1)	Freeland (3–4)	—	9,596	21–15	W1
37	May 9	Rockies	1–10	Seabold (1–0)	**Ortiz** (0–1)	—	11,916	21–16	L1
38	May 10	Rockies	3–4	Hand (2–1)	**Stephenson** (0–1)	Johnson (6)	13,491	21–17	L2
39	May 12	@ Orioles	3–6	Baker (3–0)	**Hernández** (0–1)	Bautista (9)	25,682	21–18	L3
40	May 13	@ Orioles	0–2	Wells (3–1)	**Contreras** (3–4)	Bautista (10)	21,926	21–19	L4
41	May 14	@ Orioles	4–0	**Keller** (5–1)	Gibson (4–3)	—	36,403	22–19	W1
42	May 16	@ Tigers	0–4	Lorenzen (2–2)	**Ortiz** (0–2)	—	16,484	22–20	L1
43	May 17	@ Tigers	8–0	**Hill** (4–3)	Rodríguez (4–3)	—	14,542	23–20	W1
44	May 19	Diamondbacks	13–3	**Oviedo** (3–3)	Gallen (6–2)	—	25,903	24–20	W2
45	May 20	Diamondbacks	3–4	Nelson (4–1)	**Stephenson** (0–2)	Castro (4)	22,876	24–21	L1
46	May 21	Diamondbacks	3–8	Kelly (5–3)	**Moreta** (1–1)	—	21,418	24–22	L2
47	May 22	Rangers	6–4	**Ortiz** (1–2)	Sborz (1–2)	—	10,574	25–22	W1
48	May 23	Rangers	1–6	Eovaldi (6–2)	**Hill** (4–4)	—	12,061	25–23	L1
49	May 24	Rangers	2–3	Pérez (6–1)	**Oviedo** (3–4)	Smith (9)	18,347	25–24	L2
50	May 26	@ Mariners	11–6	**Keller** (6–1)	Kirby (5–4)	—	32,209	26–24	W1
51	May 27	@ Mariners	0–5	Castillo (4–2)	**Velasquez** (4–4)	—	44,624	26–25	L1
52	May 28	@ Mariners	3–6 (10)	Saucedo (2–0)	**Stephenson** (0–3)	—	38,219	26–26	L2
53	May 29	@ Giants	4–14	DeSclafani (4–4)	**Hill** (4–5)	—	39,323	26–27	L3
54	May 30	@ Giants	2–1	**Moreta** (2–1)	Manaea (2–3)	**Bednar** (10)	24,166	27–27	W1
55	May 31	@ Giants	9–4	**Keller** (7–1)	Wood (1–1)	—	23,827	28–27	W2

June: 11–15 (Home: 10–6; Away: 1–9)

#	Date	Opponent	Score	Win	Loss	Save	Attendance	Record	Streak
56	June 2	Cardinals	7–5	**Ramírez** (1–0)	Gallegos (1–3)	**Bednar** (11)	24,388	29–27	W3
57	June 3	Cardinals	4–3	**Moreta** (3–1)	Montgomery (2–7)	**Bednar** (12)	29,161	30–27	W4
58	June 4	Cardinals	2–1	**Hill** (5–5)	Mikolas (4–2)	**Bednar** (13)	22,947	31–27	W5
59	June 5	Athletics	5–4	**Perdomo** (1–0)	Moll (0–3)	**Holderman** (1)	11,566	32–27	W6
60	June 6	Athletics	2–11	Kaprielian (1–6)	**Keller** (7–2)	—	13,691	32–28	L1
61	June 7	Athletics	5–9	Harris (1–0)	**Contreras** (3–5)	May (1)	14,550	32–29	L2
62	June 9	Mets	14–7	**Hill** (6–5)	Megill (5–4)	—	29,429	33–29	W1
63	June 10	Mets	1–5	Senga (6–3)	**Oviedo** (3–5)	—	35,290	33–30	L1
64	June 11	Mets	2–1	**Keller** (8–2)	Carrasco (2–3)	**Bednar** (14)	26,770	34–30	W1
65	June 13	@ Cubs	3–11	Taillon (2–4)	**Ortiz** (1–3)	—	33,740	34–31	L1
66	June 14	@ Cubs	6–10	Smyly (6–4)	**Contreras** (3–6)	—	30,823	34–32	L2
67	June 15	@ Cubs	2–7	Stroman (8–4)	**Oviedo** (3–6)	—	32,881	34–33	L3
68	June 16	@ Brewers	4–5	Teherán (2–2)	**Hill** (6–6)	Williams (11)	25,586	34–34	L4
69	June 17	@ Brewers	0–5	Miley (4–2)	**Keller** (8–3)	—	37,283	34–35	L5
70	June 18	@ Brewers	2–5	Megill (1–0)	**Moreta** (3–2)	Williams (12)	38,073	34–36	L6
71	June 19	Cubs	0–8	Smyly (7–4)	**Bido** (0–1)	—	23,083	34–37	L7
72	June 20	Cubs	0–4	Stroman (9–4)	**Oviedo** (3–7)	—	20,666	34–38	L8
73	June 21	Cubs	3–8	Hendricks (3–2)	**Hill** (6–7)	—	22,522	34–39	L9
74	June 22	@ Marlins	4–6	Brazobán (2–1)	**Mlodzinski** (0–1)	Puk (10)	8,261	34–40	L10
75	June 23	@ Marlins	3–1	**Ortiz** (2–3)	Puk (3–2)	**Bednar** (15)	11,843	35–40	W1
76	June 24	@ Marlins	3–4 (11)	Nardi (5–1)	**Perdomo** (1–1)	—	24,668	35–41	L1
77	June 25	@ Marlins	0–2	Pérez (5–1)	**Oviedo** (3–8)	Puk (11)	21,552	35–42	L2
78	June 27	Padres	9–4	**Hill** (7–7)	Knehr (0–1)	**Contreras** (1)	16,539	36–42	W1
79	June 28	Padres	7–1	**Keller** (9–3)	Snell (4–7)	—	14,604	37–42	W2
80	June 29	Padres	5–4	**Moreta** (4–2)	Hill (1–2)	**Bednar** (16)	16,871	38–42	W3
81	June 30	Brewers	8–7	**Mlodzinski** (1–1)	Bush (0–2)	—	29,179	39–42	W4

July: 8–16 (Home: 3–8; Away: 5–8)

#	Date	Opponent	Score	Win	Loss	Save	Attendance	Record	Streak
82	July 1	Brewers	8–11	Burnes (6–5)	**Oviedo** (3–9)	Payamps (2)	35,246	39–43	L1
83	July 2	Brewers	3–6	Rea (5–4)	**Hill** (7–8)	Williams (17)	21,884	39–44	L2
84	July 3	@ Dodgers	2–5	Ferguson (5–3)	**Keller** (9–4)	Phillips (12)	49,652	39–45	L3
85	July 4	@ Dodgers	9–7	**Bednar** (3–0)	Phillips (1–3)	—	51,487	40–45	W1
86	July 5	@ Dodgers	4–6	Miller (5–1)	**Contreras** (3–7)	Hudson (1)	45,403	40–46	L1
87	July 6	@ Dodgers	2–5	Urías (6–5)	**Oviedo** (3–10)	Vesia (1)	42,036	40–47	L2
88	July 7	@ Diamondbacks	3–7	Gallen (11–3)	**Hill** (7–9)	—	26,837	40–48	L3
89	July 8	@ Diamondbacks	2–3 (10)	McGough (1–6)	**Bednar** (3–1)	—	31,801	40–49	L4
90	July 9	@ Diamondbacks	4–2	**Bido** (1–1)	Davies (1–5)	**Bednar** (17)	30,021	41–49	W1
**93rd All-Star Game in Seattle, Washington**
91	July 14	Giants	4–6	Llovera (1–0)	**Holderman** (0–2)	Doval (27)	33,813	41–50	L1
92	July 15	Giants	1–3	Rogers (5–3)	**Mlodzinski** (1–2)	Doval (28)	34,236	41–51	L2
93	July 16	Giants	4–8 (10)	Walker (3–0)	**De Los Santos** (0–1)	—	21,642	41–52	L3
94	July 17	Guardians	0–11	Kelly (1–0)	**Priester** (0–1)	—	20,080	41–53	L4
95	July 18	Guardians	1–10	Allen (4–2)	**Keller** (9–5)	—	21,622	41–54	L5
96	July 19	Guardians	7–5	**Borucki** (1–0)	Hentges (1–2)	**Bednar** (18)	26,541	42–54	W1
97	July 21	@ Angels	5–8	Ohtani (8–5)	**Oviedo** (3–11)	Estévez (22)	40,309	42–55	L1
98	July 22	@ Angels	3–0	**Bido** (2–1)	Detmers (2–7)	**Bednar** (19)	37,240	43–55	W1
99	July 23	@ Angels	5–7	Anderson (5–2)	**Keller** (9–6)	Estévez (23)	28,385	43–56	L1
100	July 24	@ Padres	8–4	**Priester** (1–1)	Darvish (7–7)	—	43,419	44–56	W1
101	July 25	@ Padres	1–5	Snell (7–8)	**Hill** (7–10)	—	43,448	44–57	L1
102	July 26	@ Padres	3–2	**Oviedo** (4–11)	Lugo (4–5)	**Bednar** (20)	41,394	45–57	W1
103	July 28	Phillies	1–2	Wheeler (8–5)	**Keller** (9–7)	Kimbrel (17)	34,202	45–58	L1
104	July 29	Phillies	7–6	**Priester** (2–1)	Nola (9–7)	**Bednar** (21)	38,434	46–58	W1
105	July 30	Phillies	6–4 (10)	**Perdomo** (2–1)	Vasquez (2–1)	—	34,515	47–58	W2

August: 14–15 (Home: 7–9; Away: 7–6)

#	Date	Opponent	Score	Win	Loss	Save	Attendance	Record	Streak
106	August 1	Tigers	4–1	**Oviedo** (5–11)	Manning (3–3)	**Bednar** (22)	19,427	48–58	W3
107	August 2	Tigers	3–6	Rodríguez (7–5)	**Bido** (2–2)	Holton (1)	14,370	48–59	L1
108	August 3	@ Brewers	1–14	Houser (4–3)	**Keller** (9–8)	—	25,930	48–60	L2
109	August 4	@ Brewers	8–4	**De Los Santos** (1–1)	Rea (5–5)	—	35,438	49–60	W1
110	August 5	@ Brewers	2–3 (10)	Williams (6–3)	**Perdomo** (2–2)	—	35,250	49–61	L1
111	August 6	@ Brewers	4–1	**Oviedo** (6–11)	Woodruff (1–1)	—	33,144	50–61	W1
112	August 7	Braves	7–6	**Mlodzinski** (2–2)	Strider (12–4)	**Bednar** (23)	14,627	51–61	W2
113	August 8	Braves	6–8	Yates (6–0)	**Bednar** (3–2)	Iglesias (21)	15,583	51–62	L1
114	August 9	Braves	5–6	Johnson (2–6)	**Mlodzinski** (2–3)	Iglesias (22)	17,639	51–63	L2
115	August 10	Braves	7–5	**Hatch** (1–0)	Elder (8–4)	**Holderman** (2)	16,550	52–63	W1
116	August 11	Reds	2–9	Abbott (7–3)	**Oviedo** (6–12)	—	31,523	52–64	L1
—	August 12	Reds	Postponed (rain); Makeup: August 13						
117	August 13 (1)	Reds	4–2	**Perdomo** (3–2)	Young (4–1)	**Bednar** (24)	28,731	53–64	W1
118	August 13 (2)	Reds	5–6 (10)	Díaz (4–4)	**Bido** (2–3)	Duarte (1)	21,545	53–65	L1
119	August 14	@ Mets	2–7	Miller (1–0)	**Priester** (2–2)	—	23,151	53–66	L2
120	August 15	@ Mets	7–4	**Selby** (1–0)	Butto (0–2)	**Bednar** (25)	35,439	54–66	W1
121	August 16	@ Mets	3–8	Megill (7–6)	**Oviedo** (6–13)	—	30,049	54–67	L1
122	August 18	@ Twins	1–5	López (9–6)	**Jackson** (0–1)	—	30,687	54–68	L2
123	August 19	@ Twins	7–4	**Keller** (10–8)	Gray (6–6)	**Bednar** (26)	23,822	55–68	W1
124	August 20	@ Twins	0–2	Keuchel (1–1)	**Bido** (2–4)	Durán (23)	25,987	55–69	L1
125	August 21	Cardinals	11–1	**Falter** (1–7)	Rom (0–1)	—	12,270	56–69	W1
126	August 22	Cardinals	6–3	**Oviedo** (7–13)	Wainwright (3–9)	**Bednar** (27)	11,823	57–69	W2
127	August 23	Cardinals	4–6	Thompson (3–5)	**Ortiz** (2–4)	Romero (3)	11,504	57–70	L1
128	August 24	Cubs	4–5 (10)	Palencia (4–0)	**Hatch** (1–1)	Alzolay (20)	14,651	57–71	L2
129	August 25	Cubs	2–1	**Keller** (11–8)	Hendricks (5–7)	**Bednar** (28)	24,379	58–71	W1
130	August 26	Cubs	6–10	Wicks (1–0)	**Bido** (2–5)	Alzolay (21)	34,782	58–72	L1
131	August 27	Cubs	1–10	Assad (3–2)	**Falter** (1–8)	—	19,154	58–73	L2
132	August 28	@ Royals	5–0	**Oviedo** (8–13)	Greinke (1–13)	—	11,610	59–73	W1
133	August 29	@ Royals	6–3	**Ortiz** (3–4)	Hernández (1–9)	—	11,233	60–73	W2
134	August 30	@ Royals	4–1	**Jackson** (1–1)	Zerpa (1–3)	**Bednar** (29)	10,592	61–73	W3

September/October: 15–13 (Home: 7–6; Away: 8–7)

#	Date	Opponent	Score	Win	Loss	Save	Attendance	Record	Streak
135	September 1	@ Cardinals	4–2 (10)	**Selby** (2–0)	Romero (4–2)	**Bednar** (30)	33,842	62–73	W4
136	September 2	@ Cardinals	7–6	**Bolton** (1–0)	VerHagen (4–1)	**Bednar** (31)	38,276	63–73	W5
137	September 3	@ Cardinals	4–6	Thompson (4–5)	**Oviedo** (8–14)	Gallegos (10)	35,856	63–74	L1
138	September 4	Brewers	4–2	**Ortiz** (4–4)	Burnes (9–8)	**Bednar** (32)	10,831	64–74	W1
139	September 5	Brewers	3–7	Woodruff (4–1)	**Jackson** (1–2)	—	9,324	64–75	L1
140	September 6	Brewers	5–4	**Mlodzinski** (3–3)	Peguero (4–5)	**Bednar** (33)	8,594	65–75	W1
141	September 8	@ Braves	2–8	Elder (12–4)	**Keller** (11–9)	—	40,452	65–76	L1
142	September 9	@ Braves	8–4	**Borucki** (2–0)	Dodd (2–2)	—	42,866	66–76	W1
143	September 10	@ Braves	2–5	Hand (4–1)	**Selby** (2–1)	Iglesias (29)	39,071	66–77	L1
144	September 11	Nationals	2–6	Corbin (10–13)	**Jackson** (1–3)	—	10,045	66–78	L2
145	September 12	Nationals	5–1	**Falter** (2–8)	Adon (2–2)	—	9,222	67–78	W1
146	September 13	Nationals	7–6	**Priester** (3–2)	Rutledge (0–1)	**Bednar** (34)	9,883	68–78	W2
147	September 14	Nationals	2–0	**Keller** (12–9)	Gray (7–12)	**Bednar** (35)	10,728	69–78	W3
148	September 15	Yankees	5–7	Ramirez (1–2)	**Holderman** (0–3)	Holmes (20)	31,534	69–79	L1
149	September 16	Yankees	3–6	Brito (8–7)	**Ortiz** (4–5)	Holmes (21)	31,922	69–80	L2
150	September 17	Yankees	3–2	**Borucki** (3–0)	Rodón (3–6)	**Bednar** (36)	29,565	70–80	W1
151	September 19	@ Cubs	1–14	Assad (4–3)	**Falter** (2–9)	—	34,202	70–81	L1
152	September 20	@ Cubs	13–7	**Keller** (13–9)	Steele (16–5)	—	31,491	71–81	W1
153	September 21	@ Cubs	8–6	**Oviedo** (9–14)	Hendricks (6–8)	—	31,544	72–81	W2
154	September 22	@ Reds	7–5	**Stratton** (1–0)	Gibaut (8–4)	**Bednar** (37)	37,551	73–81	W3
155	September 23	@ Reds	13–12	**Hernández** (1–1)	Díaz (9–6)	**Mlodzinski** (1)	29,680	74–81	W4
156	September 24	@ Reds	2–4	Sims (7–3)	**Hernández** (1–2)	Gibaut (3)	31,191	74–82	L1
157	September 26	@ Phillies	2–3 (10)	Hoffman (5–2)	**Bednar** (3–3)	—	32,116	74–83	L2
158	September 27	@ Phillies	6–7	Kerkering (1–0)	**Hernández** (1–3)	Soto (3)	31,388	74–84	L3
159	September 28	@ Phillies	3–2	**Ortiz** (5–5)	Strahm (9–5)	**Bednar** (38)	34,046	75–84	W1
160	September 29	Marlins	3–4	Brazobán (5–2)	**Selby** (2–2)	Scott (11)	16,387	75–85	L1
161	September 30	Marlins	3–7	Puk (7–5)	**Priester** (3–3)	Scott (12)	25,030	75–86	L2
162	October 1	Marlins	3–0	**Moreta** (5–2)	Hoeing (2–3)	**Bednar** (39)	22,954	76–86	W1

== Season standings ==
=== National League Central ===
NL Central
Team	W	L	Pct.	GB	Home	Road
Milwaukee Brewers	92	70	.568	—	49‍–‍32	43‍–‍38
Chicago Cubs	83	79	.512	9	45‍–‍36	38‍–‍43
Cincinnati Reds	82	80	.506	10	38‍–‍43	44‍–‍37
Pittsburgh Pirates	76	86	.469	16	39‍–‍42	37‍–‍44
St. Louis Cardinals	71	91	.438	21	35‍–‍46	36‍–‍45

=== National League Wild Card ===
Division leaders
Team	W	L	Pct.
Atlanta Braves	104	58	.642
Los Angeles Dodgers	100	62	.617
Milwaukee Brewers	92	70	.568

Wild Card teams (Top 3 teams qualify for postseason)
Team	W	L	Pct.	GB
Philadelphia Phillies	90	72	.556	+6
Miami Marlins	84	78	.519	—
Arizona Diamondbacks	84	78	.519	—
Chicago Cubs	83	79	.512	1
San Diego Padres	82	80	.506	2
Cincinnati Reds	82	80	.506	2
San Francisco Giants	79	83	.488	5
Pittsburgh Pirates	76	86	.469	8
New York Mets	75	87	.463	9
St. Louis Cardinals	71	91	.438	13
Washington Nationals	71	91	.438	13
Colorado Rockies	59	103	.364	25

=== Record vs. opponents ===
==== Record vs. National League ====
2023 National League record Source: MLB Standings Grid – 2023
Team	AZ	ATL	CHC	CIN	COL	LAD	MIA	MIL	NYM	PHI	PIT	SD	SF	STL	WSH	AL
Arizona	—	3–3	6–1	3–4	10–3	5–8	2–4	4–2	1–6	3–4	4–2	7–6	7–6	3–3	5–1	21–25
Atlanta	3–3	—	4–2	5–1	7–0	4–3	9–4	5–1	10–3	8–5	4–3	3–4	4–2	4–2	8–5	26–20
Chicago	1–6	2–4	—	6–7	4–2	3–4	2–4	6–7	3–3	1–5	10–3	4–3	5–1	8–5	3–4	25–21
Cincinnati	4–3	1–5	7–6	—	4–2	4–2	3–3	3–10	4–2	3–4	5–8	3–3	3–4	6–7	4–3	28–18
Colorado	3–10	0–7	2–4	2–4	—	3–10	5–2	4–2	4–2	2–5	2–4	4–9	4–9	3–3	3–4	18–28
Los Angeles	8–5	3–4	4–3	2–4	10–3	—	3–3	5–1	3–3	4–2	4–3	9–4	7–6	4–3	4–2	30–16
Miami	4–2	4–9	4–2	3–3	2–5	3–3	—	3–4	4–8	7–6	5–2	2–4	3–3	3–4	11–2	26–20
Milwaukee	2–4	1–5	7–6	10–3	2–4	1–5	4–3	—	6–1	4–2	8–5	6–1	2–5	8–5	3–3	28–18
New York	6–1	3–10	3–3	2–4	2–4	3–3	8–4	1–6	—	6–7	3–3	3–3	4–3	4–3	7–6	19–27
Philadelphia	4–3	5–8	5–1	4–3	5–2	2–4	6–7	2–4	7–6	—	3–3	5–2	2–4	5–1	7–6	28–18
Pittsburgh	2–4	3–4	3–10	8–5	4–2	3–4	2–5	5–8	3–3	3–3	—	5–1	2–4	9–4	5–2	19–27
San Diego	6–7	4–3	3–4	3–3	9–4	4–9	4–2	1–6	3–3	2–5	1–5	—	8–5	3–3	3–3	28–18
San Francisco	6–7	2–4	1–5	4–3	9–4	6–7	3–3	5–2	3–4	4–2	4–2	5–8	—	6–1	1–5	20–26
St. Louis	3–3	2–4	5–8	7–6	3–3	3–4	4–3	5–8	3–4	1–5	4–9	3–3	1–6	—	4–2	23–23
Washington	1–5	5–8	4–3	3–4	4–3	2–4	2–11	3–3	6–7	6–7	2–5	3–3	5–1	2–4	—	23–23

Updated with the results of all games through October 1, 2023.

==== Record vs. American League ====
2023 National League record vs. American League Source: MLB Standings
Team	BAL	BOS	CWS	CLE	DET	HOU	KC	LAA	MIN	NYY	OAK	SEA	TB	TEX	TOR
Arizona	1–2	1–2	2–1	2–1	3–0	0–3	2–1	2–1	0–3	1–2	2–1	1–2	1–2	3–1	0–3
Atlanta	2–1	1–3	1–2	2–1	2–1	0–3	3–0	2–1	3–0	3–0	1–2	2–1	2–1	2–1	0–3
Chicago	2–1	1–2	3–1	1–2	2–1	0–3	2–1	0–3	1–2	2–1	3–0	2–1	2–1	2–1	2–1
Cincinnati	2–1	2–1	1–2	2–2	2–1	3–0	3–0	3–0	1–2	0–3	2–1	2–1	1–2	3–0	1–2
Colorado	1–2	2–1	2–1	2–1	1–2	1–3	2–1	2–1	1–2	2–1	1–2	0–3	0–3	0–3	1–2
Los Angeles	2–1	2–1	2–1	2–1	2–1	2–1	1–2	4–0	2–1	1–2	3–0	3–0	1–2	2–1	1–2
Miami	0–3	3–0	2–1	2–1	2–1	1–2	3–0	3–0	2–1	2–1	3–0	1–2	1–3	0–3	1–2
Milwaukee	2–1	1–2	3–0	2–1	1–2	2–1	3–0	2–1	2–2	2–1	0–3	3–0	1–2	3–0	1–2
New York	0–3	1–2	2–1	3–0	0–3	1–2	0–3	1–2	1–2	2–2	3–0	2–1	2–1	1–2	0–3
Philadelphia	2–1	1–2	2–1	1–2	3–0	2–1	2–1	2–1	1–2	1–2	3–0	2–1	3–0	0–3	3–1
Pittsburgh	1–2	3–0	2–1	1–2	2–2	1–2	3–0	1–2	1–2	1–2	1–2	1–2	0–3	1–2	0–3
San Diego	2–1	1–2	3–0	2–1	2–1	1–2	1–2	3–0	1–2	1–2	3–0	1–3	2–1	3–0	2–1
San Francisco	1–2	2–1	2–1	2–1	0–3	2–1	1–2	1–2	2–1	1–2	2–2	1–2	1–2	1–2	1–2
St. Louis	2–1	3–0	2–1	1–2	1–2	1–2	2–2	0–3	1–2	2–1	2–1	1–2	2–1	1–2	2–1
Washington	0–4	2–1	2–1	1–2	2–1	1–2	2–1	1–2	2–1	2–1	3–0	2–1	0–3	2–1	1–2

Updated with the results of all games through October 1, 2023.

== Roster ==
2023 Pittsburgh Pirates
Roster
Pitchers: 51 David Bednar; 70 Osvaldo Bido; 67 Cody Bolton; 43 Ryan Borucki; 59 Roansy Contreras; 29 Wil Crowe; 37 Chase De Jong; 57 Yerry De Los Santos; 44 Bailey Falter; 38 Thomas Hatch; 61 José Hernández; 44 Rich Hill; 35 Colin Holderman; 41 Andre Jackson; 23 Mitch Keller; 50 Carmen Mlodzinski; 36 Dauri Moreta; 62 Kyle Nicolas; 48 Luis Ortiz; 24 Johan Oviedo; 68 Ángel Perdomo; 64 Quinn Priester; 46 Yohan Ramírez; 52 Colin Selby; 43 Robert Stephenson; 63 Hunter Stratton; 56 Duane Underwood Jr.; 27 Vince Velasquez; 62 Rob Zastryzny	Catchers: 55 Jason Delay; 18 Austin Hedges; 54 Tyler Heineman; 25 Endy Rodríguez; Infielders: 3 Ji-hwan Bae; 71 Vinny Capra; 14 Rodolfo Castro; 91 Ji-man Choi; 15 Oneil Cruz; 39 Nick Gonzales; 13 Ke'Bryan Hayes; 39 Drew Maggi; 30 Tucupita Marcano; 6 Mark Mathias; 38 Chris Owings; 60 Liover Peguero; 6 Alfonso Rivas; 41 Carlos Santana; 19 Jared Triolo; 75 Alika Williams	Outfielders: 26 Miguel Andújar; 32 Henry Davis; 2 Connor Joe; 30 Tucupita Marcano; 22 Andrew McCutchen; 31 Cal Mitchell; 54 Josh Palacios; 10 Bryan Reynolds; 28 Canaan Smith-Njigba; 65 Jack Suwinski	Manager: 17 Derek Shelton; Coaches: 16 Tarrik Brock (first base); 82 Jordan Comadena (bullpen catcher); 86 Radley Haddad (game planning/strategy); 49 Andy Haines (hitting); 12 Don Kelly (bench); 90 Raul Hernandez (bullpen catcher); 96 Mendy López (infield); 47 Oscar Marin (pitching); 88 Christian Marrero (assistant hitting); 87 Justin Meccage (bullpen); 95 Stephen Morales (coach); 58 Mike Rabelo (third base)

== Player statistics ==
= Indicates team leader

= Indicates league leader

=== Batting ===
Note: G = Games played; AB = At bats; R = Runs; H = Hits; 2B = Doubles; 3B = Triples; HR = Home runs; RBI = Runs batted in; SB = Stolen bases; BB = Walks; AVG = Batting average; SLG = Slugging average

Player	G	AB	R	H	2B	3B	HR	RBI	SB	BB	AVG	SLG
Bryan Reynolds	145	574	85	151	31	5	24	84	12	53	.263	.460
Ke'Bryan Hayes	124	494	65	134	31	7	15	61	10	28	.271	.453
Jack Suwinski	144	447	63	100	21	2	26	74	13	75	.224	.454
Connor Joe	133	413	63	102	31	4	11	42	3	50	.247	.421
Andrew McCutchen	112	390	55	100	19	0	12	43	11	75	.256	.397
Carlos Santana	94	345	45	81	25	0	12	53	6	45	.235	.412
Ji-hwan Bae	111	334	54	77	17	2	2	32	24	30	.231	.311
Joshua Palacios	91	247	26	59	9	2	10	40	5	12	.239	.413
Henry Davis	62	225	27	48	10	0	7	24	3	25	.213	.351
Tucupita Marcano	75	202	16	47	12	2	3	18	5	10	.233	.356
Liover Peguero	59	198	21	47	4	1	7	26	6	11	.237	.374
Rodolfo Castro	78	197	19	48	7	0	6	22	1	21	.228	.355
Endy Rodríguez	57	186	27	41	7	2	3	13	0	17	.220	.328
Jared Triolo	54	181	30	54	9	0	3	21	6	24	.298	.398
Jason Delay	70	167	20	42	11	1	1	18	0	14	.251	.347
Austin Hedges	65	161	13	29	5	0	1	14	1	11	.180	.230
Nick Gonzales	35	115	12	24	8	1	2	13	0	6	.209	.348
Alika Williams	46	101	7	20	5	0	0	6	0	9	.198	.248
Alfonso Rivas	40	94	6	22	8	1	3	14	1	7	.234	.436
Miguel Andújar	30	84	9	21	7	0	4	18	2	6	.250	.476
Ji-man Choi	23	73	9	15	4	0	6	11	0	2	.205	.476
Mark Mathias	22	52	5	12	2	0	0	4	3	10	.231	.269
Oneil Cruz	9	32	7	8	1	0	1	4	3	7	.250	.375
Canaan Smith-Njigba	15	32	3	4	1	1	0	5	1	4	.125	.219
Chris Owings	10	25	0	4	0	0	0	0	0	0	.160	.160
Vinny Capra	9	18	3	3	1	0	0	1	0	2	.167	.222
Tyler Heineman	3	9	1	1	0	0	0	0	1	1	.111	.111
Drew Maggi	3	6	1	2	1	0	0	1	0	0	.333	.500
Calvin Mitchell	2	4	0	0	0	0	0	0	0	1	.000	.000
Totals	162	5406	692	1293	287	31	159	662	117	556	.239	.392
Rank in NL	—	12	13	12	5	3	14	13	10	6	13	13

Source:Baseball Reference

=== Pitching ===
Note: W = Wins; L = Losses; ERA = Earned run average; G = Games pitched; GS = Games started; SV = Saves; IP = Innings pitched; H = Hits allowed; R = Runs allowed; ER = Earned runs allowed; BB = Walks allowed; SO = Strikeouts

Player	W	L	ERA	G	GS	SV	IP	H	R	ER	BB	SO
Mitch Keller	13	9	4.21	32	32	0	194.1	187	97	91	55	210
Johan Oviedo	9	14	4.31	32	32	0	177.2	161	91	85	83	158
Rich Hill	7	10	4.76	22	22	0	119.0	129	70	63	47	104
Luis Ortiz	5	5	4.78	18	15	0	86.2	99	50	46	48	59
Roansy Contreras	3	7	6.59	19	11	1	68.1	75	50	50	32	55
David Bednar	3	3	2.00	66	0	39	67.1	53	22	15	21	80
Dauri Moreta	5	2	3.72	55	0	1	58.0	39	26	24	24	76
Colin Holderman	0	3	3.86	58	0	2	56.0	58	25	24	20	58
José Hernández	1	3	4.97	50	0	0	50.2	47	30	28	22	62
Osvaldo Bido	2	5	5.86	16	9	0	50.2	55	35	33	21	48
Quinn Priester	3	3	7.74	10	8	0	50.0	58	43	43	27	36
Andre Jackson	1	3	4.33	12	7	0	43.2	30	21	21	19	41
Ryan Borucki	4	0	2.45	38	2	0	40.1	26	11	11	4	33
Bailey Falter	2	2	5.58	10	7	0	40.1	44	25	25	12	32
Vince Velasquez	4	4	3.86	8	8	0	37.1	35	16	16	14	37
Carmen Mlodzinski	3	3	2.25	35	1	1	36.0	28	14	9	18	34
Yohan Ramírez	1	0	3.67	26	0	0	34.1	34	17	14	14	31
Ángel Perdomo	3	2	3.72	30	0	0	29.0	21	14	12	11	44
Yerry De Los Santos	1	1	3.33	22	0	0	24.1	17	10	9	13	18
Duane Underwood Jr.	1	0	5.18	20	0	2	24.1	24	14	14	11	14
Colin Selby	2	2	9.00	21	5	0	24.0	29	24	24	15	30
Thomas Hatch	1	1	4.03	12	2	0	22.1	23	13	10	7	16
Cody Bolton	1	0	6.33	16	0	0	21.1	30	15	15	15	22
Rob Zastryzny	1	0	4.79	21	1	0	20.2	24	15	11	13	15
Robert Stephenson	0	3	5.14	18	0	0	14.0	12	9	8	8	17
Hunter Stratton	0	0	2.25	8	0	0	12.0	9	3	3	3	10
Chase De Jong	0	0	13.50	6	0	0	11.1	18	17	17	6	7
Wil Crowe	0	1	4.66	5	0	1	9.2	9	6	5	9	9
Kyle Nicolas	0	0	11.81	4	0	0	5.1	7	7	7	4	7
Chris Owings	0	0	0.00	1	0	0	1.0	2	0	0	0	0
Totals	76	86	4.60	162	162	47	1430.0	1380	790	731	596	1363
Rank in NL	11	5	11	—	—	4	11	10	11	11	14	10

Source:Baseball Reference

== Farm system ==
Level	Team	League	Manager
Triple-A	Indianapolis Indians	International League	Miguel Pérez
Double-A	Altoona Curve	Eastern League	Callix Crabbe
High-A	Greensboro Grasshoppers	South Atlantic League	Robby Hammock
Low-A	Bradenton Marauders	Florida State League	Jonathan Johnston
Rookie	FCL Pirates	Florida Complex League	Jim Horner
Rookie	DSL Pirates Black	Dominican Summer League	Ethan Goforth
Rookie	DSL Pirates Gold	Dominican Summer League	
