= 1987 Caribbean Series =

1987 baseball tournament

The twenty-ninth edition of the Caribbean Series (Serie del Caribe) was played in 1987. It was held from February 3 through February 8 with the champions teams from the Dominican Republic, Águilas Cibaeñas; Mexico, Venados de Mazatlán; Puerto Rico, Criollos de Caguas, and Venezuela, Leones del Caracas. The format consisted of 12 games, each team facing the other teams twice. The games were played at Héctor Espino Baseball Stadium in Hermosillo, Mexico.

== Summary ==
Game 10 Venezuela 0 México 4 Dominicañ Reuble 1 Rico Rico 4

== Final standings ==
Country	Club	W	L	W/L %	Managers
Puerto Rico (*)	Criollos de Caguas	5	2	.714	Ramón Avilés
Dominican Republic	Águilas Cibaeñas	4	3	.571	Winston Llenas
Mexico	Venados de Mazatlán	2	4	.333	Carlos Paz
Venezuela	Leones del Caracas	2	4	.333	Bill Plummer
* Won the championship game

== Individual leaders ==
Player	Statistic
Batting
Carmelo Martínez (PUR)	Batting average	.556
Candy Maldonado (PUR)	Runs	8
Carmelo Martínez (PUR)	Hits	10
Lloyd McClendon (VEN)	Doubles	2
Two tied	Triples	1
Candy Maldonado (PUR)	Home runs	4
Dion James (DOM); Carmelo Martínez (PUR)	RBI	9
Henry Cotto (PUR)	Stolen bases	6
Pitching
Francisco Oliveras (PUR)	Wins	2
Alan Fowlkes (DOM)	Strikeouts	12
Alan Fowlkes (DOM)	ERA	0.00
Francisco Oliveras (PUR)	Innings pitched	15 2/3
Andy Araujo (DOM); Jay Baller (VEN)	Saves	1

== All-Star Team ==
Name	Position
Orlando Mercado (PUR)	Catcher
Carmelo Martínez (PUR)	First baseman
Juan Castillo (DOM)	Second baseman
Nelson Barrera (MEX)	Third baseman
Alfredo Griffin (DOM)	Shortstop
Luis Polonia (DOM)	Left fielder
Raymundo Torres (MEX)	Center fielder
Alonso Téllez (MEX)	Right fielder
Eddie Vargas (PUR)	Designated hitter
Francisco Oliveras (PUR)	Right-handed pitcher
Juan Nieves (PUR)	Left-handed pitcher
Awards
Carmelo Martínez (PUR)	Most Valuable Player
Ramón Avilés (PUR)	Manager

== See also ==
- Ballplayers who have played in the Series

== Sources ==
- Nuñez, José Antero (1994). Serie del Caribe de la Habana a Puerto La Cruz. JAN Editor. ISBN 980-07-2389-7
