= Leones de Yucatán =

Mexican professional baseball team

Logo	Cap insignia

Information
- League: Mexican League (Zona Sur)
- Location: Mérida, Yucatán
- Ballpark: Parque Kukulcán Alamo
- Founded: 1954
- League championships: 5 (1957, 1984, 2006, S2018, 2022)
- Division championships: 10 (1984, 1989, 1996, 2000, 2006, 2007, S2018, 2019, 2021, 2022)
- Former ballpark: Parque Carta Clara
- Colors: Green, orange, white
- Ownership: Grupo ARHE
- President: Erick Ernesto Arellano Hernández
- Manager: Hensley Meulens
- Website: https://www.leones.mx/

Current uniforms
Home	Away

The Leones de Yucatán (English: Yucatán Lions) are a professional baseball team in the Mexican League. The team plays its home games at Parque Kukulcán Alamo in Mérida, Yucatán. The Leones have won the Mexican League title five times in 1957, 1984, 2006, 2018, and most recently in 2022.

== History ==
=== Mexican League debut ===
The Leones de Yucatán were founded in 1954 under the leadership of Alvaro Ponce Vidiella and Humberto "Beto" Abimerhi Abimerhi. The team's entry to the Mexican League was announced on 5 January 1954. The team nickname is a reference to the name of the beer company built by the Ponce family. The Leones opened the season on 17 April at the newly built Carta Clara Park, hosting the previous season's champions, the Tecolotes de Nuevo Laredo, and earning an 8–0 victory. In its first year in the league, the Leones won 47 games and lost 32, with one tie, and finished in second place to the defending champion Tecolotes. The team ceased play after the 1958 season and the franchise moved to Veracruz in 1959.

=== Second version ===
After the 1969 season, filmmaker Manuel Barbachano Ponce, moved the Pericos de Puebla franchise to Mérida, renaming it the Leones. In the opening game of the 1970 season on March 18 the Leones beat the Rojos del Águila de Veracruz, 4–1. The franchise remained in Mérida for five seasons and then moved to Villahermosa, Tabasco, when Ariel "Picho" Magaña Carrillo purchased the team.

=== Third version ===
The third incarnation of the Lions began in 1979. On 6 April 1978, the Assembly of the Mexican League approved five expansion teams for the 1979 season. One of the expansion teams was awarded to Yucatán.

On 16 March 1979, the Leones officially returned to the Mexican League when they opened the season at the Cafeteros de Córdoba and lost 10–4. The Leones finished fifth in the Southern Division with 62 wins and 69 losses. Rookie pitcher Fernando Valenzuela, who later became a star in Major League Baseball, played for the Leones in 1979, winning Rookie of the Year honors that the season. Valenzuela had a win–loss record of 10–12 with an earned run average (ERA) of 2.42 and allowed only 70 walks while striking out 141 batters in 181 innings, catching the attention of the Los Angeles Dodgers with whom he would play from 1980 to 1990.

== Uniform ==
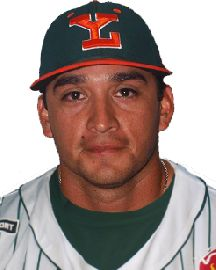
Lee Cruz

Team colors are green, orange and white. The home uniform is green pinstripes on white background. Cap insignia includes a ligature of L and Y (team initials).

== Rivalries ==
=== Piratas de Campeche ===
Since they began play in the Mexican League in summer 1954, the Lions have had fierce rivalries, first with the Mexico City Diablos Rojos and the Mexico City Tigres, and then from 1980 with the Campeche Piratas.

== Retired numbers ==
The Leones have retired the following numbers:

- 1 Juan José Pacho
- 2 Luis Arredondo
- 3 Mercedes Esquer
- 4 Oswaldo Morejón
- 15 Fernando Villaescusa
- 16 Óliver Pérez
- 17 Carlos Paz
- 18 Ray Torres
- 19 Ricardo Conde
- 21 Héctor Espino
- 25 Yoanner Negrín
- 29 Leonel Aldama
- 34 Fernando Valenzuela

== Roster ==
Leones de Yucatán roster
Players	Coaches/Other
Pitchers: 52 (Venezuela) José Álvarez; 35 (United States) Brandon Brennan; 98 (United States) Colten Brewer; 38 (Dominican Republic) Miguel Castro; 89 (United States) Tyler Duffey; 47 (Venezuela) Edwin Escobar; 46 (Venezuela) Pedro García; -- (Mexico) Adrián Hernández∞; 25 (Cuba) Yoanner Negrín; 28 (Dominican Republic) Ángel Perdomo; 96 (Mexico) Dalton Rodríguez; 68 (Venezuela) Ricardo Rodríguez; 48 (Mexico) Jake Sanchez; 51 (Dominican Republic) César Valdez; 99 (Mexico) Irving Vázquez; 67 (United States) Derek West; 20 (United States) Jared Wetherbee; 0 (United States) Ronnie Williams; Catchers: 24 (Mexico) Xorge Carrillo; 74 (Mexico) Julián León; 55 (Mexico) Jafet Ojeda∞; 78 (Mexico) Fabián Urbina; Infielders: 13 (Colombia) Jordan Díaz; 61 (Mexico) Reivaj García; 39 (Dominican Republic) Erik González; 5 (United States) Dalton Guthrie; 7 (United States) Marco Jaime; 43 (Puerto Rico) Edwin Ríos; 79 (Mexico) Ichiro Rodríguez; -- (United States) Addison Russell; Outfielders: 36 (United States) Wynton Bernard; 33 (Cuba) Yadir Drake; 27 (Dominican Republic) Estevan Florial; 44 (Mexico) José Gaitán; 9 (Mexico) Norberto Obeso; 14 (Puerto Rico) Henry Ramos	Manager: -- (Mexico) Adulfo Camacho; Coaches: -- (Mexico) Armando Araiza (bench/catching); -- (Dominican Republic) Dionys César (first base); 16 (Mexico) Salvador Garibay (bullpen); -- (Mexico) Walter Ibarra (assistant); 98 (Mexico) Luis Juárez (assistant); -- (Mexico) Miguel López (pitching); 7-day injured list; ~ Development list; # Rehab assignment; ∞ Reserve list; ‡ Restricted list; § Suspended list; † Temporarily inactive list; Roster updated May 19, 2026; Transactions; → More rosters: MiLB • Mexican League

== Championships ==
Season	Manager	Opponent	Series score	Record
1957	(Cuba) Oscar Rodríguez	No final series		68–52–2
1984	(Cuba) Carlos Paz	Indios de Ciudad Juárez	4–2	76–56
2006	(Dominican Republic) Lino Rivera	Sultanes de Monterrey	4–1	70–56
2018^{[a]}	(Mexico) Roberto Vizcarra	Sultanes de Monterrey	4–3	52–24
2022	(Mexico) Roberto Vizcarra	Sultanes de Monterrey	4–3	58–49
Total championships			5	

== Baseball Champions League Americas record ==
Year	Venue	Finish	Wins	Losses	Win%	Manager
2023	(Mexico) Mérida	3rd	1	2	.333	(Mexico) Roberto Vizcarra
Total			1	2	.333	

== Notes ==
- ^{a} The 2018 season was contested in a two-tournament format known as Spring and Autumn. Yucatán won the Spring tournament.
