= Chris Owings =

American baseball player (born 1991)

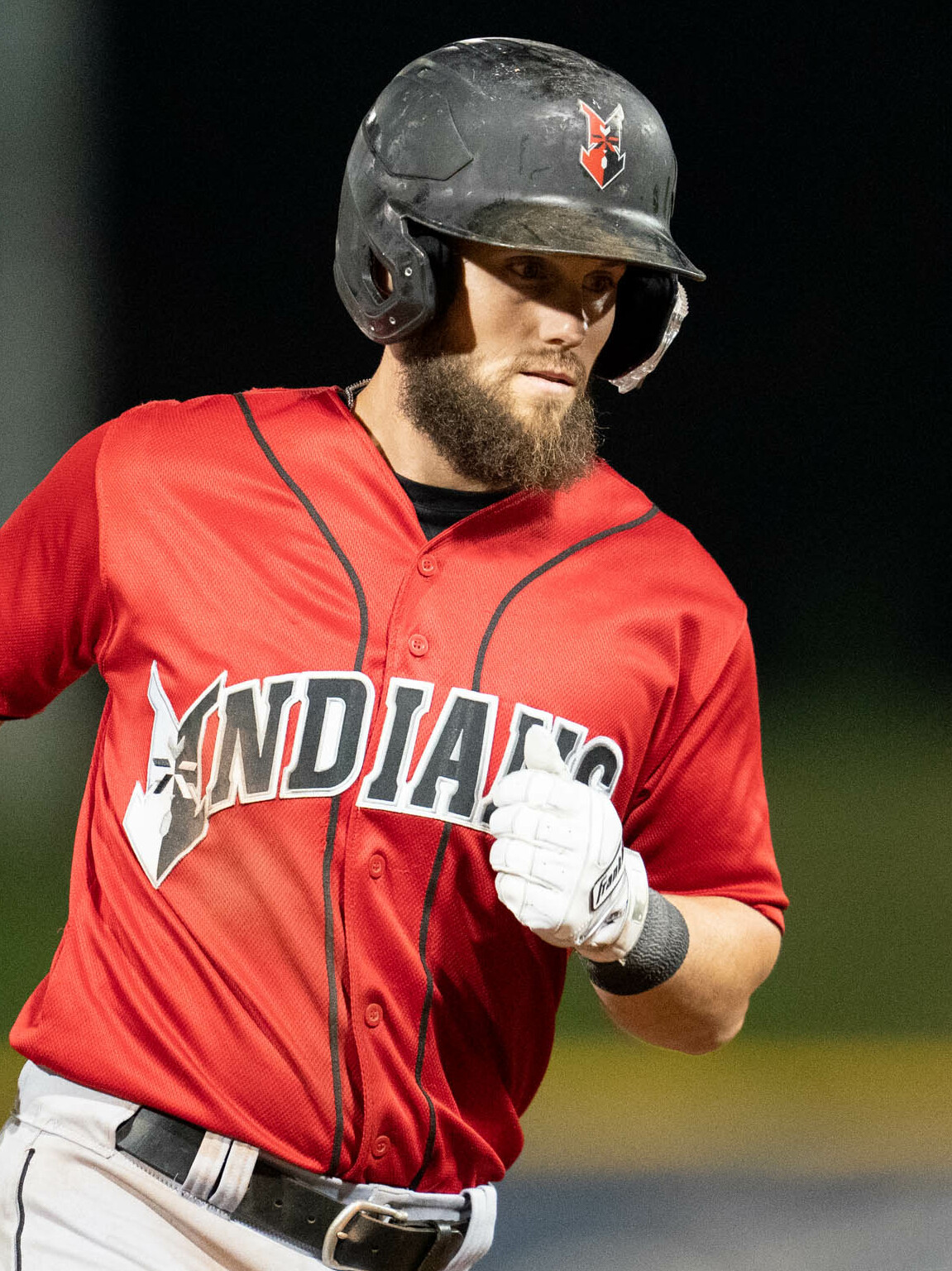
- Owings with the Indianapolis Indians in 2023
- Shortstop / Second baseman / Outfielder
- Born: August 12, 1991 (age 35); Charleston, South Carolina, U.S.
- Batted: Right Threw: Right

MLB debut
- September 3, 2013, for the Arizona Diamondbacks

Last MLB appearance
- May 31, 2023, for the Pittsburgh Pirates

MLB statistics
- Batting average: .239
- Home runs: 37
- Runs batted in: 220
- Stats at Baseball Reference

Teams
- Arizona Diamondbacks (2013–2018); Kansas City Royals (2019); Boston Red Sox (2019); Colorado Rockies (2020–2021); Baltimore Orioles (2022); Pittsburgh Pirates (2023)

Christopher Scott Owings (born August 12, 1991) is an American former professional baseball utility player. He played in Major League Baseball (MLB) for the Arizona Diamondbacks, Kansas City Royals, Boston Red Sox, Colorado Rockies, Baltimore Orioles, and Pittsburgh Pirates. Owings mostly played as a middle infielder and as an outfielder. Listed at 5 feet 10 inches (1.78 m) and 185 pounds (84 kg), he bats and throws right-handed.

== Professional career ==
=== Arizona Diamondbacks ===
==== Minor leagues ====
The Arizona Diamondbacks selected Owings in the first round of the 2009 Major League Baseball draft out of Gilbert High School in Gilbert, South Carolina. He signed with the Diamondbacks, receiving a $950,000 signing bonus, rather than follow through with his commitment to the University of South Carolina. He was assigned to the Missoula Osprey of the Rookie-level Pioneer League to start his professional career.

Owings started the 2012 season with the Visalia Rawhide of the High-A California League, hitting .324/.362/.544 with 11 home runs in 59 games. He was than promoted to the Double-A Mobile BayBears where he hit .263/.291/.377 with six home runs in 69 games.

Owings spent the 2013 season with the Reno Aces of the Triple-A Pacific Coast League (PCL). After batting .330 with 12 home runs, 31 doubles, 81 RBI and 20 stolen bases, he won the PCL's Most Valuable Player Award.

==== Major leagues ====
The Diamondbacks selected Owings' contract from Reno on September 3, 2013, after the major league rosters expanded. He made his major league debut that day, where he pinch hit in the fifth inning against the Toronto Blue Jays and grounded out to the second baseman.

In spring training in 2014, Owings competed for the starting shortstop role with Didi Gregorius, the Diamondbacks' starting shortstop during the prior season. Owings was named the Diamondbacks' starting shortstop for Opening Day. Owings led all National League rookies with a .313 batting average in April, and was named the National League Rookie of the Month for April 2014. He suffered a left shoulder injury in June, and had offseason surgery to repair the posterior labrum in the shoulder. For the season, Owings played in 91 games with Arizona, batting .261 with six home runs and 26 RBIs.

Owings batted .227 and .277 in 2015 and 2016, respectively. While only playing in 119 games during 2016, Owings led the major leagues in triples, with 11. On Opening Day 2017, Owings hit a game-winning single against San Francisco Giants closer Mark Melancon, giving the Diamondbacks a 6–5 win. During 2017, he appeared in 97 games, batting .268 with 12 home runs and 51 RBIs. In 2018, Owings played in 106 games for Arizona, recording four home runs and 22 RBIs with a .206 average. On November 30, 2018, the Diamondbacks non-tendered Owings and he became a free agent.

Overall, during parts of six major league seasons with the Diamondbacks, Owings appeared in 580 games, batting .250 with 31 home runs and 196 RBIs.

=== Kansas City Royals ===
On December 5, 2018, the Kansas City Royals signed Owings to a one-year, $3 million contract. In 40 games with the Royals, he batted .133 with two home runs and nine RBIs, while striking out 55 times in 135 at bats. Owings was designated for assignment on May 31, 2019. The day prior, he had recorded a golden sombrero, striking out four times in a game. Earlier in May, he had struck out looking against a position player, Tyler White of the Houston Astros. Owings pitched for the first time in MLB during a 16–1 loss to the Texas Rangers on May 16.

=== Boston Red Sox ===
On June 17, 2019, Owings signed a minor league deal with the Boston Red Sox; he was assigned to the Triple-A Pawtucket Red Sox. On August 11, Boston added Owings to their active roster, and he made his first appearance with the Red Sox, against the Los Angeles Angels. Owings appeared in 26 games with the 2019 Red Sox, batting .156 with one home run and five RBIs. On October 21, he elected to become a free agent rather than accepting a Triple-A assignment.

=== Colorado Rockies ===
On January 3, 2020, Owings signed a minor league deal with the Colorado Rockies. On July 17, 2020, it was announced that Owings would have his contract selected to the 40-man roster by the Rockies in advance of Opening Day. His contract was selected the following day. He appeared in 17 games for Colorado, hitting .268 with 2 home runs and 5 RBI.

On January 20, 2021, Owings re-signed with the Rockies organization on a minor league contract. A couple months later, Owings was selected to the 40-man roster, and eventually named to the Opening Day roster that would occur on April 1 against the Los Angeles Dodgers. The Rockies would win 8–5 against the Dodgers, with Owings collecting three hits (one triple), an RBI, two stolen bases, and scoring three runs himself. On April 10, Owings was placed on the 10-day injured list due to hamstring tightness and a thumb sprain. Over a week later, Owings needed surgery on his thumb that would take at least eight weeks to recover from, prompting the Rockies to move Owings to the 60-day list.

Owings was reinstated from the injured list on June 22. On July 20, Owings suffered a mallet finger on his left thumb. He underwent surgery for it three days later which would ultimately take him out for the rest of the season. On August 5, he was officially ruled out by the Rockies.

=== Baltimore Orioles ===
On March 15, 2022, Owings signed a minor league contract with the Baltimore Orioles. He made the Orioles' Opening Day roster. He appeared in 27 games for the Orioles, limping to a .107/.254/.143 with no home runs or RBI. Owings was designated for assignment to create a roster spot for Austin Voth on June 8, 2022. He cleared waivers and was released five days later on June 13.

=== New York Yankees ===
Owings signed a minor league contract with the New York Yankees on June 18, 2022. Owings appeared in 59 games for the Triple-A Scranton/Wilkes-Barre RailRiders, slashing .235/.303/.412 with 8 home runs and 30 RBI. He elected free agency following the season on November 10.

=== Pittsburgh Pirates ===
On February 2, 2023, Owings signed a minor league contract with the Pittsburgh Pirates organization. On March 25, Owings was informed that he would not make the Opening Day roster. Instead of activating the opt-out clause in his contract, Owings accepted an assignment to the Triple-A Indianapolis Indians. In 13 games for Indianapolis, Owings batted .273/.360/.523 with 2 home runs and 4 RBI. On May 8, Owings had his contract selected to the active roster. In 11 games for Pittsburgh, Owings went 4-for-25 (.160) with 12 strikeouts and no walks. He was designated for assignment on June 3, following the promotion of Ángel Perdomo. On October 13, Owings elected free agency.

=== Los Angeles Dodgers ===
On February 8, 2024, Owings signed a minor league contract with the Los Angeles Dodgers and he was assigned to the Triple-A Oklahoma City Baseball Club, for whom he played in 80 games with a .262 batting average, nine homers and 32 RBI. Owings was released by the Dodgers organization on July 30.

On October 7, 2025, Owings announced his retirement from professional baseball.

== Personal life ==
Owings has two brothers who have played in Minor League Baseball. Older brother Kyle pitched in Arizona's farm system in 2012. Younger brother Connor played college baseball for Coastal Carolina University, was selected by the Diamondbacks in the 2016 MLB draft, and played in Single-A as an outfielder for Arizona in 2016 and 2017. Connor's baseball career has been impacted by a medical condition that resulted in him having a kidney transplant in February 2018.

== See also ==
- Arizona Diamondbacks award winners and league leaders
- List of Major League Baseball annual triples leaders
