= Tyler Heineman =

American baseball player (born 1991)

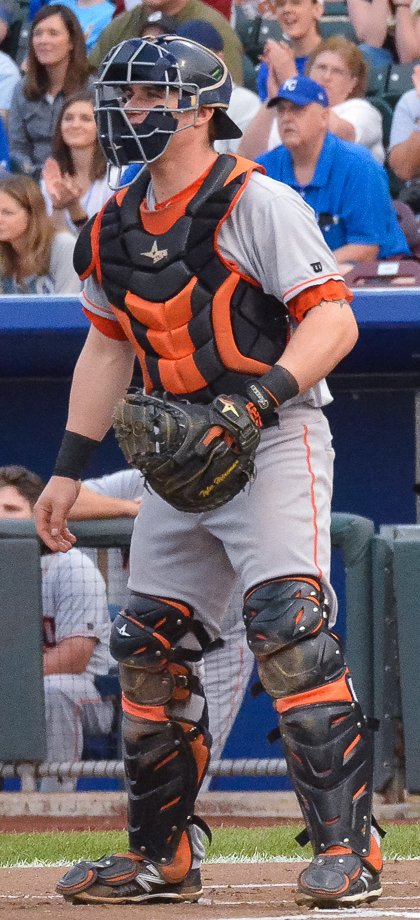
- Heineman playing for the Fresno Grizzlies in 2015

Los Angeles Angels – No. 31
- Catcher
- Born: June 19, 1991 (age 35); Los Angeles, California, U.S.
- Bats: Switch Throws: Right

MLB debut
- September 4, 2019, for the Miami Marlins

MLB statistics (through 2026 season)
- Batting average: .220
- Home runs: 5
- Runs batted in: 45
- Stats at Baseball Reference

Teams
- Miami Marlins (2019); San Francisco Giants (2020); Toronto Blue Jays (2022); Pittsburgh Pirates (2022–2023); Toronto Blue Jays (2023); Boston Red Sox (2024); Toronto Blue Jays (2024–2026); Los Angeles Angels (2026–present)

Tyler Andrew Heineman (born June 19, 1991) is an American professional baseball catcher for the Los Angeles Angels of Major League Baseball (MLB). He has previously played in MLB for the Miami Marlins, San Francisco Giants, Toronto Blue Jays, Pittsburgh Pirates, and Boston Red Sox. Heineman played college baseball for the UCLA Bruins and was selected by the Houston Astros in the eighth round of the 2012 MLB draft. He made his MLB debut in 2019 with the Marlins.

== Amateur career ==
Heineman attended the Windward School in Los Angeles. There, he played for the school's baseball team. He batted .490 as a sophomore (2007), batted .619 as a junior (2008; establishing the Windward School single-season batting average record), and batted .487 and earned first-team All-California Interscholastic Federation Division IV honors as a senior (2009) in addition to Delphic League MVP honors.

Lightly recruited by college baseball programs, Heineman did not receive any scholarship offers. He enrolled at the University of California, Los Angeles (UCLA), where he made the UCLA Bruins baseball team as a walk-on. He played sparingly as a freshman and sophomore, receiving eight at bats as a freshman, and batting .261 in 23 games as a sophomore. Heineman became the Bruins' starting catcher his junior year after starting catcher Steve Rodriguez and recruit Austin Hedges signed professional contracts. He was named All-Pac-12 Conference and a semifinalist for the Johnny Bench Award, given annually to college baseball's best catcher.

In summer 2011, Heineman played summer league baseball for the Wisconsin Woodchucks of the Northwoods League.

== Career ==
=== Houston Astros ===
The Houston Astros selected Heineman in the eighth round of the 2012 MLB draft. He played for the Tri-City ValleyCats of the Low–A New York–Penn League after signing, and his .358 batting average led the league, while he ranked second in the league in OBP (.452) and OPS (.882). He was a mid-season All Star, and an MiLB Organization All Star.

He played for the Lancaster JetHawks of the High–A California League in 2013, and the Corpus Christi Hooks of the Double–A Texas League in 2014. After the 2014 regular season, the Astros assigned Heineman to the Salt River Rafters of the Arizona Fall League.

Heineman began the 2015 season with Corpus Christi, and received a midseason promotion to the Fresno Grizzlies of the Triple–A Pacific Coast League. He finished 2015 with a .285 batting average, three home runs, and 30 runs batted in. Heineman also spent 2016 with Fresno, where he batted .259 with three home runs and 14 RBI.

=== Milwaukee Brewers ===
On March 26, 2017, during spring training, the Astros traded Heineman to the Milwaukee Brewers in exchange for a player to be named later or cash considerations. The Brewers assigned him to the Triple–A Colorado Springs Sky Sox, where he posted a .281 batting average with two home runs and 20 RBI across 199 at bats.

In 2018, Heineman played in 78 games split between Colorado Springs and the Double–A Biloxi Shuckers, accumulating a .251/.360/.346 batting line with four home runs and 24 RBI. He elected free agency following the season on November 2, 2018.

=== Arizona Diamondbacks ===
On November 13, 2018, Heineman signed a minor league contract with the Arizona Diamondbacks. He opened the 2019 season with the Triple-A Reno Aces, batting .325/.407/.525 in 80 at-bats.

=== Miami Marlins ===
On June 3, 2019, the Diamondbacks traded Heineman to the Miami Marlins for cash considerations. On September 3, the Marlins selected Heineman's contract. He made his major league debut the next day against the Pittsburgh Pirates, striking out as a pinch hitter. Heineman recorded his first MLB hit on September 25; a pinch-hit double off Jacob deGrom. Heineman hit his first career home run off Zack Wheeler on September 26. On October 16, he was removed from the 40-man roster and sent outright to the Triple–A New Orleans Baby Cakes. He was an MiLB Organization All Star. Heineman elected free agency following the season on November 4.

=== San Francisco Giants ===
On January 6, 2020, Heineman signed a minor league contract with the San Francisco Giants that included an invitation to spring training. On July 23, his contract was selected to the major league roster. In 15 games for the Giants, Heineman batted .190/.292/.214 with 8 hits over 42 trips to the plate. He was outrighted off of the 40-man roster on November 1, and became a free agent the following day.

=== St. Louis Cardinals ===
On November 13, 2020, Heineman signed a minor league contract with the St. Louis Cardinals. On July 1, 2021, after hitting .254 in only 77 plate appearances with the Triple-A Memphis Redbirds, Heineman was released by the Cardinals.

=== Philadelphia Phillies ===
On July 3, 2021, Heineman signed a minor league deal with the Philadelphia Phillies organization. Heineman played in 20 games for the Triple-A Lehigh Valley IronPigs, hitting .274 with 6 RBIs. He became a free agent following the season.

=== Toronto Blue Jays ===
On March 12, 2022, Heineman signed a minor league contract with the Toronto Blue Jays. He was selected to the active roster on April 11. Heineman played in 10 games for Toronto, going 4-for-15 (.267) with one RBI.

=== Pittsburgh Pirates ===
On May 16, 2022, Tyler Heineman was claimed off waivers by the Pittsburgh Pirates. He played in 52 games for Pittsburgh, slashing .211/.277/.254 with no home runs and 8 RBI. On November 15, Heineman was designated for assignment by the Pirates after they protected multiple prospects from the Rule 5 draft. On November 18, he was non-tendered and became a free agent.

On December 12, 2022, Heineman re-signed with the Pirates on a minor league contract. On April 4, 2023, Heineman was selected to the active roster. He appeared in 3 games for Pittsburgh, going 1-for-9 with a walk, a stolen base, and a strikeout. On April 26, Heineman was designated for assignment by Pittsburgh following the promotion of Cody Bolton.

=== Toronto Blue Jays (second stint) ===
On April 30, 2023, Heineman was traded to the Toronto Blue Jays in exchange for Vinny Capra. He played in 19 total games for Toronto, slashing .276/.432/.379 with three RBI and seven walks.

=== Boston Red Sox ===
On December 1, 2023, Heineman was claimed off waivers by the New York Mets. The Mets then designated him for assignment on January 30, 2024 and traded him to the Boston Red Sox on February 2 in exchange for cash considerations. Heineman was optioned to the Triple–A Worcester Red Sox to begin the 2024 season.

He was added to Boston's active roster on April 21, when Triston Casas was placed on the injured list. On April 23, Heineman was placed on the injured list with a right hamstring injury. Following his injury, Heineman was sent to Triple-A Worcester. On June 24, Heineman was recalled to Boston after catcher Connor Wong was placed on the paternity list. He was optioned back to Triple-A Worcester on June 27. Heineman was designated for assignment following the promotion of Zach Penrod on September 14.

=== Toronto Blue Jays (third stint) ===
On September 16, 2024, Heineman was claimed off waivers by the Toronto Blue Jays. He made five appearances for the Blue Jays, going 1-for-10 (.100) with three walks.

Heineman earned the backup catcher role behind Alejandro Kirk ahead of the 2025 season. On September 19, 2025, Heineman came into pitch during a 20–1 blowout loss to the Kansas City Royals; in the outing, he surrendered 10 runs in 13 hits over 1 1/3 innings pitched. Heineman played in 61 total games for the Blue Jays during the regular season, slashing .289/.361/.416 with three home runs, 20 RBI, and two stolen bases.

Heineman made 31 appearances for Toronto in 2026, batting .154/.205/.205 with one home run and six RBI. On June 12, 2026, Heineman was designated for assignment by the Blue Jays following Kirk's activation from the injured list.

=== Los Angeles Angels ===
On June 17, 2026, Heineman was traded to the Los Angeles Angels in exchange for cash considerations. Heineman played in 44 games for the Angels, slashing .192/.238/.232 with two doubles, a triple and four RBIs. In November 2026, Heineman agreed to a one-year contract with the Angels for the following season.

== Personal life ==
Heineman's younger brother, Scott, is a former professional baseball outfielder.

Their father, Steve, served with the Santa Monica Police Department.

Tyler is also known as the “clubhouse magician” for his ability to perform magic tricks.
