= Adrián Hernández (baseball, born 2000) =

Mexican baseball player (born 2000)

Leones de Yucatán – No. 22
- Pitcher
- Born: January 22, 2000 (age 26); Escuinapa de Hidalgo, Mexico
- Bats: Right Throws: Right

Adrián Ulises Hernández (born January 22, 2000) is a Mexican professional baseball pitcher for the Leones de Yucatán of the Mexican League.

== Career ==
=== Toronto Blue Jays ===
Hernández signed with the Toronto Blue Jays as an international free agent on November 23, 2017, and in 2018 was assigned to the Rookie-level Dominican Summer League Blue Jays. In 55 1/3 innings pitched, Hernández posted a 3–1 win–loss record, 2.60 earned run average (ERA), and 64 strikeouts. In 2019, Hernández pitched for the rookie-level Gulf Coast League Blue Jays, and struggled to an 8.02 ERA in 16 relief appearances. He did not play in a game in 2020 due to the minor league season because of the COVID-19 pandemic. During the 2020–21 winter season, Hernández played for the Cañeros de Los Mochis of the Mexican Pacific League; in 20 appearances, he pitched to a 1–0 record, 2.45 ERA, and 34 strikeouts.

Hernández began the 2021 season with the Single-A Dunedin Blue Jays, and was later promoted to the High-A Vancouver Canadians and Double-A New Hampshire Fisher Cats. In a combined 62 1/3 innings, Hernández went 3–2 with a 2.74 ERA, 108 strikeouts, and seven saves, and was named a Minor League Baseball (MiLB) Organization All-Star following the season. He began the 2022 season with New Hampshire, and was promoted to the Triple-A Buffalo Bisons early in the year. In 38 total appearances on the season, Hernández compiled a 5–0 record and 4.22 ERA with 59 strikeouts and eight saves across 42 2/3 innings pitched.

Hernández spent the entirety of the 2023 campaign with Double-A New Hampshire, registering a 2–3 record and 4.62 ERA with 60 strikeouts in 48 2/3 innings pitched across 38 appearances. He split the 2024 season between New Hampshire and Buffalo, accumulating a combined 2–2 record and 4.56 ERA with 54 strikeouts over 37 appearances out of the bullpen. Hernández elected free agency following the season on November 4, 2024.

=== Leones de Yucatán ===
On March 20, 2025, Hernández signed with the Leones de Yucatán of the Mexican League. In eight appearances for Yucatán, he recorded a 5.00 ERA with 10 strikeouts over nine innings of work.
