= Luis Juárez =

Baseball player (born 1990)

Leones de Yucatán – No. 98
- Catcher / Left fielder / Coach
- Born: February 6, 1990 (age 36); Culiacán, Sinaloa, Mexico
- Bats: Right Throws: Right
- Stats at Baseball Reference

Luis Felipe Juárez Díaz (born February 6, 1990), nicknamed "El Pepón" is a Mexican former professional baseball first baseman and current hitting coach for the Leones de Yucatán of the Mexican League. He was selected Mexico national baseball team at 2017 World Baseball Classic, 2019 Pan American Games Qualifier, and 2019 exhibition games against Japan.

== Playing career ==
=== Sultanes de Monterrey ===
On April 3, 2009, Juárez signed with the Sultanes de Monterrey of the Mexican League. After 8 seasons with the club, he became a free agent, but re-signed with the team on March 30, 2017.

=== Leones de Yucatán ===
On December 21, 2017, Juárez was traded alongside Walter Ibarra to the Leones de Yucatán in exchange for Francisco Lugo and Ricky Alvarez. Juárez did not play in a game in 2020 due to the cancellation of the Mexican League season because of the COVID-19 pandemic.

In 2022, he played in 43 games for Yucatán, hitting .297/.420/.573 with 10 home runs and 35 RBI. Juárez won the Mexican League Championship with the Leones in 2022.

== Coaching career ==
After retiring as a player in February in 2026, Juárez joined the Leones de Yucatán as hitting coach ahead of the 2026 Mexican League season.
