= Walter Ibarra =

Mexican baseball player (born 1987)

Leones de Yucatán
- Infielder / Manager / Coach
- Born: November 1, 1987 (age 38); Los Mochis, Sinaloa, Mexico
- Bats: Both Throws: Right
- Stats at Baseball Reference

Walter Ibarra Gámez (born November 1, 1987) is a Mexican professional baseball infielder, former interim manager and a current coach for the Leones de Yucatán of the Mexican League.

== Playing career ==
=== New York Yankees ===
Ibarra signed with the New York Yankees as an international free agent in 2006. He played for the Mexico national baseball team in the 2013 World Baseball Classic. After batting .312 in 20 games for the Trenton Thunder of the Double–A Eastern League in 2013, the Yankees promoted him to the Scranton/Wilkes-Barre RailRiders of the Triple–A International League.

=== Los Angeles Dodgers ===
Ibarra signed a minor league deal with the Chicago Cubs on November 11, 2013, but was released and signed with the Los Angeles Dodgers, who assigned him to the Triple–A Albuquerque Isotopes. In 97 games for the Isotopes, he hit .269 with 5 homers and 32 RBI, while splitting time between second base and shortstop.

=== Arizona Diamondbacks ===
On November 4, 2014, Ibarra signed a minor league contract with the Arizona Diamondbacks. On April 7, 2015, Ibarra was loaned to the Sultanes de Monterrey of the Mexican League and was returned to the Diamondbacks on September 24. He elected free agency on November 6.

=== Sultanes de Monterrey ===
On April 1, 2016, Ibarra signed with the Sultanes de Monterrey of the Mexican League.

=== Leones de Yucatán ===
On December 21, 2017, Ibarra was traded to the Leones de Yucatán of the Mexican League alongside Luis Juárez in exchange for Francisco Lugo and Ricky Alvarez. He made 95 appearances for the team in 2018, batting .289/.337/.424 with seven home runs, 51 RBI, and four stolen bases. Ibarra played in 90 contests for Yucatán in 2019, slashing .262/.352/.348 with two home runs, 40 RBI, and six stolen bases.

Ibarra did not play in a game in 2020 due to the cancellation of the Mexican League season because of the COVID-19 pandemic. He returned to action in 2021, batting .322/.375/.428 with three home runs, 29 RBI, and two stolen bases across 53 games.

In 2022, Ibarra played in 52 games for Yucatán, hitting .257/.300/.332 with one home run and 33 RBI. Ibarra won the Mexican League Championship with the Leones in 2022. He played in only 18 games for the club in 2023, going 12-for-52 (.231) with four RBI and three walks. Ibarra made 15 appearances for the Leones during the 2024 season, going 6-for-32 (.188) with one walk.

Ibarra played in 15 games for Yucatán in 2025, hitting .154/.175/.179 with four RBI and one walk, prior to being named interim manager on June 4, 2025. On June 10, Ibarra was activated as a player/coach. He was released by the team on September 25.

== Coaching career ==
On June 4, 2025, Ibarra was named interim manager for the Leones de Yucatán of the Mexican League, following Miguel Ojeda's resignation. On June 17, Oswaldo Morejón was named as Yucatán's manager for the remainder of the season. On May 12, 2026, Ibarra was promoted to the role of bench coach.
