= Dionys César =

Dominican baseball player and manager (born 1976)

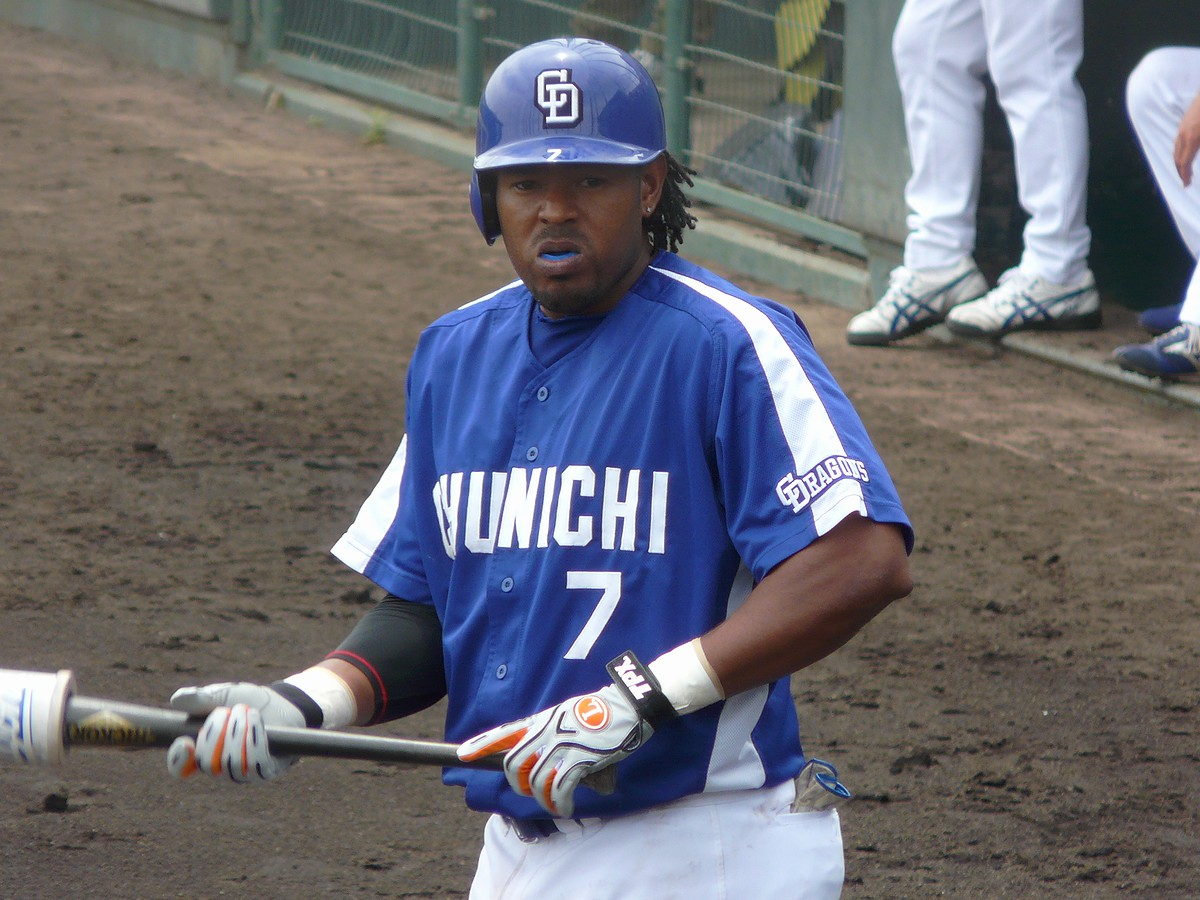
- César with the Chunichi Dragons in 2010

Leones de Yucatán
- Infielder / Coach
- Born: 27 September 1976 (age 49); Yamasá, Dominican Republic
- Batted: Switch Threw: Right

Professional debut
- CPBL: 28 August, 2005, for the Chinatrust Whales
- NPB: 20 March, 2010, for the Chunichi Dragons

Last appearance
- CPBL: 17 October, 2005, for the Chinatrust Whales
- NPB: 29 August, 2010, for the Chunichi Dragons

CPBL statistics
- Batting average: .307
- Home runs: 1
- Runs batted in: 12

NPB statistics
- Batting average: .215
- Home runs: 1
- Runs batted in: 10
- Stats at Baseball Reference

Teams
- Chinatrust Whales (2005); Chunichi Dragons (2010)

Dionys Alejandro César Álvarez (born 27 September 1976) is a Dominican professional baseball coach for the Leones de Yucatán of the Mexican League and former infielder. His career spanned 20 seasons, from 1995 to 2015. He played in the minor leagues, Mexican League (LMB), Chinese Professional Baseball League (CPBL), Atlantic League of Professional Baseball, Golden Baseball League, Nippon Professional Baseball (NPB), American Association of Professional Baseball and the winter leagues Mexican Pacific League (LMP) and Dominican Professional Baseball League (LIDOM).

== Playing career ==
=== Minor leagues ===
César spent ten seasons playing in the minor leagues, from 1995 to 2004. He began his professional career in the Oakland Athletics organization, playing at various levels between 1995 and 2000, including stints with the AZL Athletics, Modesto A's, Southern Oregon Timberjacks, Visalia Oaks, and Midland RockHounds.

He later joined the Milwaukee Brewers organization, appearing with the Indianapolis Indians and the Huntsville Stars in 2001 and 2002. In 2003, he played in the Montreal Expos system with the Edmonton Trappers before spending the 2003 and 2004 seasons in the Cincinnati Reds organization with the Chattanooga Lookouts and Louisville Bats. He also made an appearance in 2004 with the Chicago White Sox organization, playing for the Charlotte Knights.

=== Mexican League ===
César also played in the Mexican League (LMB), beginning with the Rojos del Águila de Veracruz in 2003. He later spent three seasons with the Sultanes de Monterrey from 2005 to 2007, followed by stints with the Vaqueros Laguna in 2008 and 2009, where he led the league in batting average and was named the league’s Most Valuable Player in 2009.

After a season playing in Japan in 2010, he returned to the Mexican League with the Vaqueros Laguna in 2011 and concluded his LMB career with the Broncos de Reynosa in 2012.

=== Chinatrust Whales ===
In 2005, César signed with the Chinatrust Whales of the Chinese Professional Baseball League (CPBL). He appeared in 40 games, scoring 14 runs, collecting 35 hits, hitting one home run, driving in 12 runs and posting a .307 batting average in 114 at bats.

=== Chunichi Dragons ===
In November 2009, César participated in a tryout held in the Dominican Republic by the Chunichi Dragons of the Nippon Professional Baseball (NPB). His performance caught the eye of Shigekazu Mori, manager of the Dragons, who signed him for the club. César officially joined the Dragons on 11 December 2009, with a reported annual salary of $250,000.

Despite struggling in the preseason, César started the 2010 season playing as second baseman and second batter against the Hiroshima Toyo Carp. However, on 25 April, he was demoted to minor league team; he was promoted back on 13 May. He was not re-signed for the 2011 season.

=== Mexican Pacific League ===
César also played winter baseball in the Mexican Pacific League (LMP). He made his debut in 2006, playing for the Venados de Mazatlán. He played the 2007–08 season with the Cañeros de Los Mochis. He spent the 2008–09 season with the Tomateros de Culiacán and Algodoneros de Guasave. He returned to the league in the 2011–12 season, with the Naranjeros de Hermosillo.

=== Dominican Professional Baseball League ===
César played three seasons in the Dominican Professional Baseball League (LIDOM) with the Águilas Cibaeñas from 2009 to 2011 and again during the 2014–15 season, after which he retired from professional baseball following his release by the team in September 2015.

=== Independent baseball ===
César also played in independent baseball, competing in several leagues across the United States. In 2007, he appeared in the Atlantic League of Professional Baseball with both the Long Island Ducks and the Lancaster Barnstormers. He later played for the Yuma Scorpions of the Golden Baseball League in 2008. After returning to independent ball in 2012 with the Sugar Land Skeeters of the Atlantic League, he split the 2013 season between the Camden Riversharks of the Atlantic League and the Fargo-Moorhead RedHawks of the American Association of Professional Baseball.

== Coaching career ==
After his retirement, César has worked as a hitting coach for several Mexican League teams. He joined the Algodoneros de Unión Laguna as their hitting coach on 23 July 2019; he was released on 22 June 2021. On 28 February 2022, he was hired as hitting coach for the Leones de Yucatán. On 14 June 2022, he joined the Tigres de Quintana Roo as the team's hitting coach, replacing Felipe Gutiérrez. In 2024, he joined the Conspiradores de Querétaro, also as batting coach, before being released by the team on 19 November 2025.

On April 16, 2026, César joined the Leones de Yucatán as the team's first base coach.
