= Carlos Paz (baseball) =

Cuban baseball player and manager (1942–2025)

- Pitcher / Infielder / Manager
- Born: 7 April 1942; Regla, Havana, Cuba
- Died: 2 July 2025 (aged 83); Mérida, Yucatán, Mexico
- Batted: Right Threw: Right

Carlos Paz González (born 7 April 1942) was a Cuban professional baseball pitcher, infielder and manager. Paz spent most of his career in Mexico, both as a player as a manager. As a manager, he won the 1984 Mexican League championship with the Leones de Yucatán and remains as the winningest manager in the history of the club.

== Playing career ==
=== Minor leagues ===
Paz was born on 7 April 1942 in the Regla municipality of Havana. He began his professional career in 1960 with the Daytona Beach Islanders of the Florida State League, an affiliate of the St. Louis Cardinals. He made 52 appearances playing as second baseman and shortstop, hitting .156/.267/.168.

He did not play again until 1972, when he appeared for the Key West Conchs of the Florida State League as both a pitcher and an infielder. He posted a 15–12 record with a 2.89 ERA as a pitcher, and in 94 games as a position player, he recorded a .180/.211/.232 batting line.

=== Mexican League ===
In 1973, Paz made his Mexican League debut with the Leones de Yucatán, playing both as a pitcher and infielder, as he would do for his entire Mexican League career. As a pitcher he recorded 9 wins and 14 losses and a 3.95 ERA; as a player he batted .227/.250/.299. In 1974, he played for Yucatán, the Broncos de Reynosa and the Alijadores de Tampico. In 1975 he played for the Cardenales de Tabasco during their inaugural season, and in 1977, he appeared for the Tecolotes de Nuevo Laredo.

== Managerial career ==
In 1979, Paz was invited to manage the Leones de Yucatán while he was part of the coaching staff of the Diablos Rojos del México. He returned to the team in 1982 and 1984 he led the Leones to the Mexican League championship.

In 1987, he joined the Acereros de Monclova as their manager. He went on to manage the Charros de Jalisco in 1988, the Industriales de Monterrey in 1989 and the Rieleros de Aguascalientes in 1990. After a stint with the Sultanes de Monterrey in 1992, he returned to the Leones de Yucatán in 1995 for his third tenure with the club. He managed the Petroleros de Minatitlán in 1996, followed by the Olmecas de Tabasco and the Piratas de Campeche in 1997. In 1998, he remained with the Piratas de Campeche and later returned to the Leones de Yucatán, where he remained through the 1999 season. He managed the Langosteros de Cancún in 2000 and the Rojos del Águila de Veracruz in 2001, before returning to the Langosteros de Cancún in 2005 and concluding his managerial career with the Cafeteros de Córdoba in 2006.

Paz also managed in the Mexican Pacific League, leading the Venados de Mazatlán to the 1968–87 season championship, during which he was named Manager of the Year. With the title, Mazatlán qualified for the 1987 Caribbean Series, where the team finished third with a 2–4 record.

As of the 2025 season, Paz is the winningest manager in the history of the Leones de Yucatán, compiling a 537–489–12 record over 1,036 games.

== Death ==
Paz died on 2 July 2025 in Mérida, Yucatán, where he lived since 1979. For the remainder of the 2025 season, the Leones wore a commemorative patch honoring Paz.

== Legacy ==
Paz's number 17 was retired by the Leones de Yucatán in 2012. He was also inducted to the Yucatán Sports Hall of Fame.
