= José Hernández (pitcher) =

Dominican baseball player (born 1997)

Guerreros de Oaxaca – No. 39
- Pitcher
- Born: December 31, 1997 (age 28); Puerto Plata, Dominican Republic
- Bats: Left Throws: Left

MLB debut
- April 1, 2023, for the Pittsburgh Pirates

MLB statistics (through 2024 season)
- Win–loss record: 2–4
- Earned run average: 4.82
- Strikeouts: 66
- Stats at Baseball Reference

Teams
- Pittsburgh Pirates (2023–2024)

José Ernesto Hernández (born December 31, 1997) is a Dominican professional baseball pitcher for the Guerreros de Oaxaca of the Mexican League. He has previously played in Major League Baseball (MLB) for the Pittsburgh Pirates.

== Early life ==
Hernández is from Puerto Plata, where he grew up playing baseball and basketball.

== Career ==
=== Los Angeles Dodgers ===
On May 12, 2016, the Los Angeles Dodgers signed Hernández as an international free agent. He made his professional debut with the Dominican Summer League Dodgers. Returning to the DSL Dodgers in 2017, he recorded a 6–2 record and 2.52 ERA with 55 strikeouts in 64 1/3 innings pitched across 15 appearances (14 starts). For the 2018 season, he played with the rookie-level Arizona League Dodgers, registering a 2–1 record and 2.96 ERA with 38 strikeouts in 27 1/3 innings pitched over 15 games.

After missing the 2019 season because of injury, Hernández did not play in a game in 2020 due to the cancellation of the minor league season because of the COVID-19 pandemic. In his return season, he made 32 appearances split between the Single-A Rancho Cucamonga Quakes and High-A Great Lakes Loons, posting a 3–2 record and 4.37 ERA with 61 strikeouts in 45 1/3 innings pitched. In 2022, Hernández played High-A Great Lakes and the Double-A Tulsa Drillers, accumulating a 4–4 record and 3.32 ERA with 69 strikeouts and eight saves in 59 2/3 innings pitched.

=== Pittsburgh Pirates ===
On December 7, 2022, the Pittsburgh Pirates selected Hernández from the Dodgers in the Rule 5 draft. He made the Pirates’ Opening Day roster out of spring training in 2023 and made his debut with one scoreless inning of relief on April 1 against the Cincinnati Reds. His first MLB strikeout was of Christian Arroyo of the Boston Red Sox on April 4. In 50 relief outings during his rookie campaign, Hernández recorded a 4.97 ERA with 62 strikeouts across 50 2/3 innings pitched.

Hernandez was optioned to the Triple–A Indianapolis Indians prior to the 2024 season, but made the Opening Day roster after pitcher Roansy Contreras was placed on the MLB paternity list. In his first appearance of the season, Hernandez pitched a scoreless 12th inning to notch his first career save in a against the Miami Marlins. In seven games for the Pirates, he recorded a 3.38 ERA with four strikeouts across 5 1/3 innings pitched. On June 11, he was designated for assignment.

=== Los Angeles Dodgers (second stint) ===
On June 13, 2024, Hernández was traded back to the Dodgers in exchange for cash considerations. He was removed from the 40–man roster and sent outright to the minor leagues on July 17. He pitched three scoreless innings on a rehab assignment for the rookie-level Arizona Complex League Dodgers and then 18 innings for the Triple–A Oklahoma City Baseball Club, where he allowed nine earned runs for a 4.50 ERA with 14 strikeouts.

Hernández returned to Oklahoma City for 2025, where he pitched 27 1/3 innings in 21 games, compiling an 0–4 record and 4.94 ERA with 34 strikeouts. He was released by the Dodgers organization on June 22.

=== Toros de Tijuana ===
On July 8, 2025, Hernández signed with the Toros de Tijuana of the Mexican League. In 12 appearances for Tijuana, he logged a 3.86 ERA with 10 strikeouts across 9 1/3 innings pitched. Hernández became a free agent following the season.

=== Olmecas de Tabasco ===
On June 12, 2026, Hernández signed with the Olmecas de Tabasco of the Mexican League. In nine appearances for the Olmecas, he posted a 4.32 ERA with four strikeouts in 8 1/3 innings pitched. On July 17, Hernández was released by Tabasco.

=== Guerreros de Oaxaca ===
On July 17, 2026, Hernández signed with the Guerreros de Oaxaca of the Mexican League.

== See also ==
- Rule 5 draft results
