= Vinny Capra =

American baseball player (born 1996)

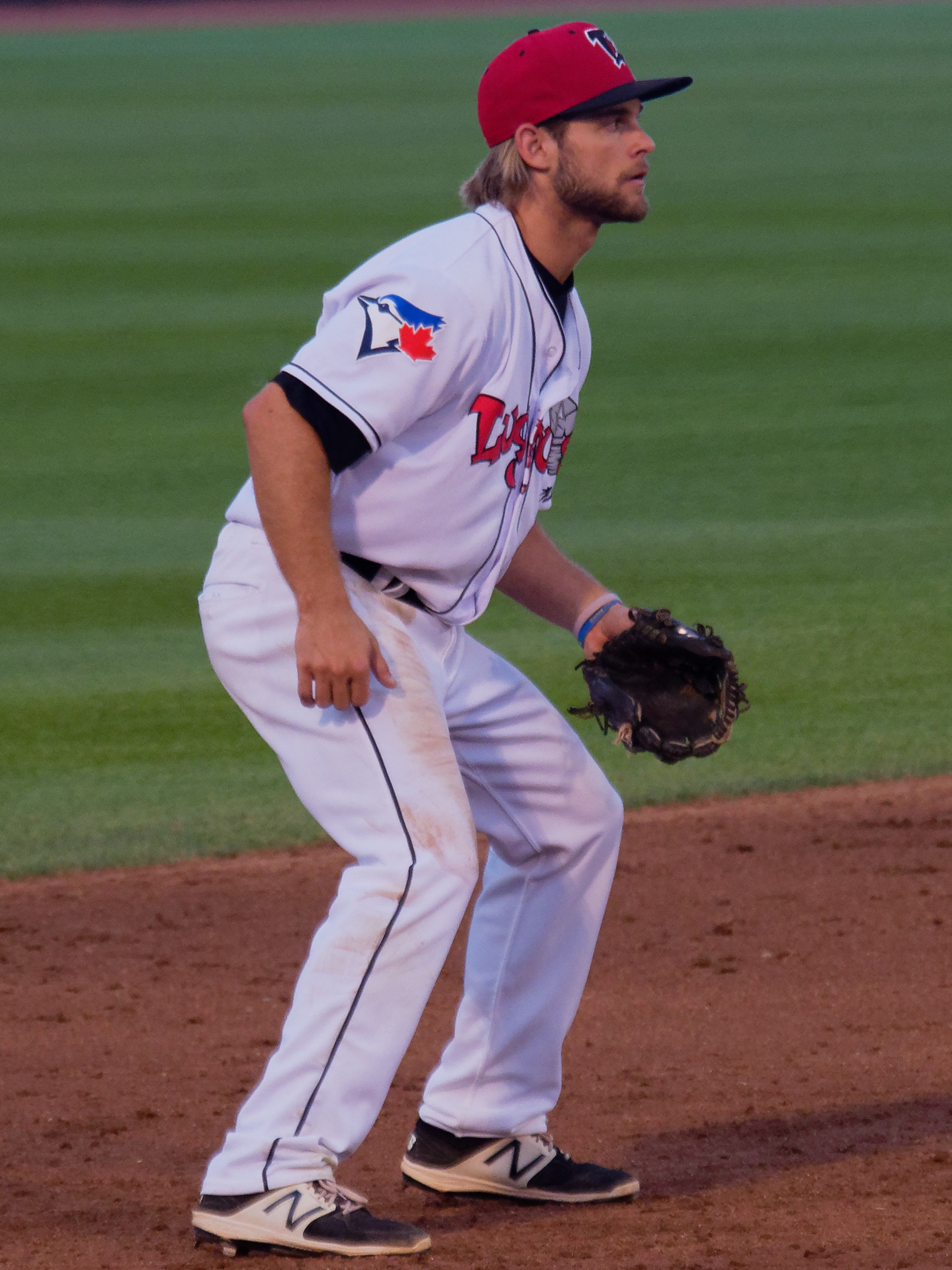
- Capra with the Lansing Lugnuts in 2018

Free agent
- Infielder
- Born: July 7, 1996 (age 30); Melbourne, Florida, U.S.
- Bats: Right Throws: Right

MLB debut
- May 1, 2022, for the Toronto Blue Jays

MLB statistics (through 2025 season)
- Batting average: .133
- Home runs: 1
- Runs batted in: 7
- Stats at Baseball Reference

Teams
- Toronto Blue Jays (2022); Pittsburgh Pirates (2023); Milwaukee Brewers (2024–2025); Chicago White Sox (2025)

Vincent James Capra (born July 7, 1996) is an American professional baseball infielder who is a free agent. He has previously played in Major League Baseball (MLB) for the Toronto Blue Jays, Pittsburgh Pirates, Milwaukee Brewers, and Chicago White Sox.

== Amateur career ==
Capra attended the Melbourne Central Catholic High School in Melbourne, Florida, where he helped lead the Hustlers to a state championship. He began playing college baseball at Eastern Florida State College. He transferred to the University of Richmond to play for the Richmond Spiders. In 2017, Capra batted .356 with four home runs and 19 runs batted in (RBIs) for the Spiders. He then appeared in 48 games for the Walla Walla Sweets of the West Coast League, a collegiate summer league. In his final season with the Spiders in 2018, Capra hit .327 with five home runs, 41 RBIs, and nine stolen bases.

== Professional career ==
=== Toronto Blue Jays ===
The Toronto Blue Jays selected Capra in the 20th round of the 2018 Major League Baseball draft. He was assigned to the Low-A Vancouver Canadians, and was later promoted to the Single-A Lansing Lugnuts. In a combined 64 games, Capra batted .248 with two home runs, 22 RBIs, and nine stolen bases. He spent the entire 2019 season with the Double-A New Hampshire Fisher Cats, and recorded a .229 batting average with three home runs, 33 RBIs, and 15 stolen bases. Capra did not play in a game in 2020 due to the cancellation of the minor league season because of the COVID-19 pandemic. In 2021, he appeared in 79 games for the Fisher Cats and Triple-A Buffalo Bisons, and set new career-highs with a .316 batting average, 10 home runs, and 58 RBIs.

The Blue Jays promoted Capra to the major leagues on April 29, 2022. He made his major league debut on May 1. He appeared in 8 major league games for Toronto, going 1-for-5 with 2 walks. Capra hit .283/.378/.403 with 5 home runs and 28 RBI in 52 games with Triple-A Buffalo but missed the latter part of the year after undergoing left middle finger tendon surgery. On November 18, 2022, Capra was non-tendered by the Blue Jays and became a free agent.

Capra re-signed with Toronto on a minor league contract on November 20, 2022. He began the 2023 season with Triple-A Buffalo, playing in 17 games and hitting .167/.357/.222 with five RBI.

=== Pittsburgh Pirates ===
On April 30, 2023, Capra was traded to the Pittsburgh Pirates for Tyler Heineman. In 34 games for the Triple–A Indianapolis Indians, he batted .350/.457/.485 with 2 home runs, 24 RBI, and 5 stolen bases. On August 1, the Pirates selected Capra's contract, adding him to the major league roster. In nine games for the Pirates, Capra went 3–for–18 (.167) with no home runs and one RBI.

=== Milwaukee Brewers ===
On November 2, 2023, Capra was claimed off waivers by the Milwaukee Brewers. He was optioned to the Triple–A Nashville Sounds to begin the 2024 season. He was recalled to the majors on July 3, 2024, getting into a game the same day. In three games with Milwaukee, Capra went 1-for-9 with one run scored, and was sent back down to the Sounds on July 12.

Capra made the Brewers' 2025 Opening Day roster in part thanks to strong batting performances during spring training, including five home runs. His spring training success did not carry through to the regular season, as in 24 games for the Brewers (59 plate appearances), Capra batted .074/.121/.130 with one home run, four RBI, and one stolen base. Capra was designated for assignment by the Brewers on May 9, 2025.

=== Chicago White Sox ===
On May 15, 2025, Capra was claimed off waivers by the Chicago White Sox. He played in 23 games for the White Sox, with eight hits in 42 at-bats for a .190/.205/.238 slash line, with no home runs and 2 RBI. Capra also struck out 10 times, the last of which -- and also the last at-bat of his MLB career to date -- was the 3,000th strikeout in Clayton Kershaw's career. Two days later, Capra was designated for assignment concurrent with the promotion of Colson Montgomery on July 4. He cleared waivers and was sent outright to the Triple-A Charlotte Knights on July 8. He hit .286/.384/.440 with 3 HR and 10 RBI in 24 games for Charlotte, but Capra's season ended in late August with an injury, and he was not recalled to the majors. He elected free agency following the season on November 6.

=== Boston Red Sox ===
On November 26, 2025, Capra signed a minor league contract with the Boston Red Sox. In 110 games with Triple-A Worcester Red Sox he batted .269/.367/.409 with 11 home runs, 56 RBIs and 12 stolen bases. He elected free agency on November 2.
