= Johan Oviedo =

Cuban baseball player (born 1998)

Arizona Diamondbacks
- Pitcher
- Born: March 2, 1998 (age 28); Havana, Cuba
- Bats: Right Throws: Right

MLB debut
- August 19, 2020, for the St. Louis Cardinals

MLB statistics (through 2026 season)
- Win–loss record: 15–26
- Earned run average: 4.29
- Strikeouts: 324
- Stats at Baseball Reference

Teams
- St. Louis Cardinals (2020–2022); Pittsburgh Pirates (2022–2023, 2025); Boston Red Sox (2026)
Medals
Men's baseball
Representing Cuba
15U Baseball World Championship
Silver medal – second place	2012 Chihuahua	Team

Johan Oviedo (born March 2, 1998) is a Cuban professional baseball pitcher for the Arizona Diamondbacks of Major League Baseball (MLB). He has previously played in MLB for the St. Louis Cardinals, Pittsburgh Pirates, and Boston Red Sox.

== Career ==
=== St. Louis Cardinals ===
On July 2, 2016, Oviedo signed with the St. Louis Cardinals as an international free agent and was assigned to the Dominican Summer League Cardinals. He split the 2017 season with the rookie-level Johnson City Cardinals and Low-A State College Spikes. In 2018, Oviedo was promoted to the Single-A Peoria Chiefs, where he would spend the season. He then spent the 2019 season with the High-A Palm Beach Cardinals and Double-A Springfield Cardinals, where he accumulated a 12–8 record and 4.73 ERA with 163 strikeouts in 29 games (28 starts).

Oviedo was assigned to the Triple-A Memphis Redbirds to begin the 2020 season, but due to the COVID-19 pandemic, Minor League Baseball did not have a season and he was added to the newly formed 60-man player pool.

Oviedo was selected to the active roster on August 19, 2020, and made his MLB debut that day. Over five starts with St. Louis, he went 0–3 with a 5.47 ERA, striking out 16 over 24 2/3 innings. After making 19 starts and 24 total appearances without earning a win, Oviedo earned his first career win on June 22, 2022, against the Milwaukee Brewers, pitching 2 1/3 scoreless innings out of the bullpen and striking out three.

=== Pittsburgh Pirates ===
On August 1, 2022, Oviedo and Malcom Núñez were traded to the Pittsburgh Pirates in exchange for José Quintana and Chris Stratton. In seven starts for Pittsburgh, he logged a 2–2 record and 3.23 ERA with 28 strikeouts across 30 2/3 innings pitched.

On May 24, 2023, Oviedo pitched an immaculate inning against the Texas Rangers, retiring Jonah Heim, Robbie Grossman, and Josh Smith in order in the 4th inning. On August 28, he pitched his first complete game shutout in a 5–0 win vs. Kansas City. In 32 starts for Pittsburgh, Oviedo posted a 9–14 record with a 4.31 ERA and 158 strikeouts across 177 2/3 innings pitched; he also led all NL pitchers with 11 pitcher pitch timer violations. During the offseason, Oviedo had suffered a right elbow injury that required him to get Tommy John surgery, causing him to miss the 2024 season.

Oviedo began the 2025 season on the injured list due to a lat injury. He made his first mound appearance since 2023 on July 2, 2025, in a rehabilitation start for the rookie-level Florida Complex League Pirates. Oviedo was activated from the injured list on August 4. He made nine starts for Pittsburgh, compiling a 2–1 record and 3.57 ERA with 42 strikeouts across 40 1/3 innings pitched.

=== Boston Red Sox ===
On December 4, 2025, the Pirates traded Oviedo, Tyler Samaniego, and Adonys Guzman to the Boston Red Sox in exchange for Jhostynxon García and Jesus Travieso. On April 8, 2026, Oviedo was shut down from throwing for six weeks after being diagnosed with a flexor strain. He was transferred to the 60-day injured list on April 14.

=== Arizona Diamondbacks ===
On November 20, 2026, Oviedo was traded to the Arizona Diamondbacks in exchange for Luke Dotson and a player to be named later or cash considerations.

== Personal life ==
In 2016, Oviedo began living with his aunt and uncle in Jacksonville, Florida. In July 2018, Oviedo obtained a green card.

Oviedo was born to parents Lazaro and Yudith, and was raised with a younger sister, Jeanine.
