= Colin Selby =

American baseball player (born 1997)

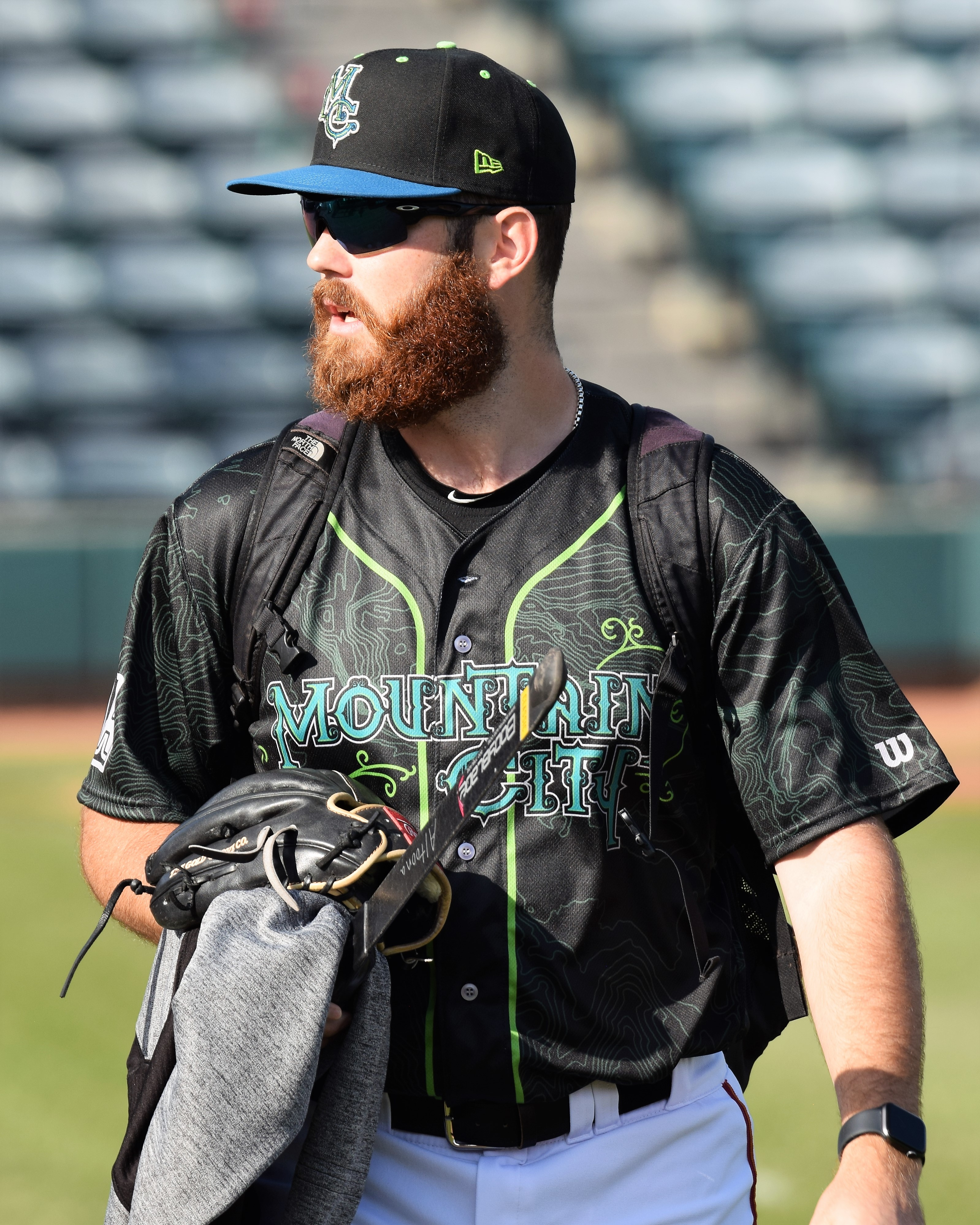
- Selby with the Altoona Curve in 2022

Free agent
- Pitcher
- Born: October 24, 1997 (age 29); Chesapeake, Virginia, U.S.
- Bats: Right Throws: Right

MLB debut
- August 9, 2023, for the Pittsburgh Pirates

MLB statistics (through 2025 season)
- Win–loss record: 2–4
- Earned run average: 6.20
- Strikeouts: 49
- Stats at Baseball Reference

Teams
- Pittsburgh Pirates (2023); Kansas City Royals (2024); Baltimore Orioles (2024–2025)

Colin Andrew Selby (born October 24, 1997) is an American professional baseball pitcher who is a free agent. He has previously played in MLB for the Pittsburgh Pirates and Kansas City Royals. He made his MLB debut in 2023 for the Pirates.

== Career ==
=== Pittsburgh Pirates ===
Selby played college baseball at Randolph–Macon College. He was drafted by the Pittsburgh Pirates in the 16th round, with the 474th overall selection, of the 2018 Major League Baseball draft. He spent his first professional season with the rookie–level Bristol Pirates, posting a 4.15 ERA across 11 starts. In 2019, Selby spent the season with Single–A Greensboro Grasshoppers, pitching in 17 games and registering a 6–3 record and 2.97 ERA with 86 strikeouts in 88.0 innings of work.

Selby did not play in a game in 2020 due to the cancellation of the minor league season because of the COVID-19 pandemic. He returned to High–A Greensboro in 2021, making 31 appearances out of the bullpen and logging a 4.37 ERA with 67 strikeouts and 6 saves across 59 2/3 innings of work. Selby spent the 2022 season with the Double–A Altoona Curve, also appearing in three games for the Triple–A Indianapolis Indians. In 26 games for Altoona, he recorded a 2.27 ERA with 43 strikeouts and 8 saves in 32 2/3 innings pitched.

On November 15, 2022, the Pirates added Selby to their 40-man roster to protect him from the Rule 5 draft. Selby began the 2023 season on the Opening Day roster of the Indianapolis Indians. He spent most of the season as the Indians primary closer, posting a 3.86 ERA with 6 saves in 28 appearances prior to his promotion. On August 8, 2023, Selby was promoted to the major leagues for the first time, making his debut the following day against the Atlanta Braves. In his debut, Selby pitched 1 2/3 innings, recording three strikeouts in relief. He pitched in 21 games during his rookie campaign, struggling to a 9.00 ERA with 30 strikeouts across 24.0 innings pitched.

Selby was optioned to Triple–A Indianapolis to begin the 2024 season. On April 2, 2024, Selby was designated for assignment following the acquisition of Joey Bart.

=== Kansas City Royals ===
On April 7, 2024, Selby was traded to the Kansas City Royals in exchange for Connor Oliver. He made two appearances for Kansas City, posting a 6.00 ERA with no strikeouts across three innings pitched. Selby was designated for assignment by the Royals on July 6.

=== Baltimore Orioles ===
On July 11, 2024, the Royals traded Selby to the Baltimore Orioles in exchange for cash considerations. He made three scoreless appearances for the Orioles, striking out five batters over four innings pitched.

Selby was optioned to the Triple-A Norfolk Tides to begin the 2025 season. Selby made 11 appearances for Baltimore during the regular season, compiling an 0-2 record and 3.21 ERA with 14 strikeouts across 14 innings pitched.

On February 14, 2026, Selby was placed on the 60-day injured list due to right shoulder inflammation. On July 31, Selby underwent season–ending surgery to repair his right labrum and rotator cuff. On October 31, he was sent outright to Triple-A Norfolk Tides. He elected free agency on November 2.
