= Francisco Oliveras =

Puerto Rican baseball player (born 1963)

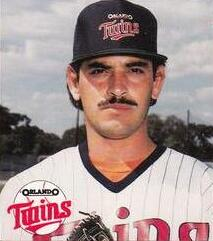
- Oliveras with the Orlando Twins c. 1988
- Pitcher
- Born: January 31, 1963 (age 63); Santurce, San Juan, Puerto Rico
- Batted: Right Threw: Right

MLB debut
- May 3, 1989, for the Minnesota Twins

Last MLB appearance
- October 3, 1992, for the San Francisco Giants

MLB statistics
- Win–loss record: 11–15
- Earned run average: 3.71
- Strikeouts: 130

CPBL statistics
- Win–loss record: 1–0
- Earned run average: 7.07
- Strikeouts: 6
- Stats at Baseball Reference

Teams
- Minnesota Twins (1989); San Francisco Giants (1990–1992); Brother Elephants (1995)

Francisco Javier Oliveras Noa (born January 31, 1963) is a Puerto Rican former Major League Baseball (MLB) pitcher. He played for the Minnesota Twins and San Francisco Giants from 1989 to 1992.

== See also ==
- List of Major League Baseball players from Puerto Rico
