= Dauri Moreta =

Dominican baseball player (born 1996)

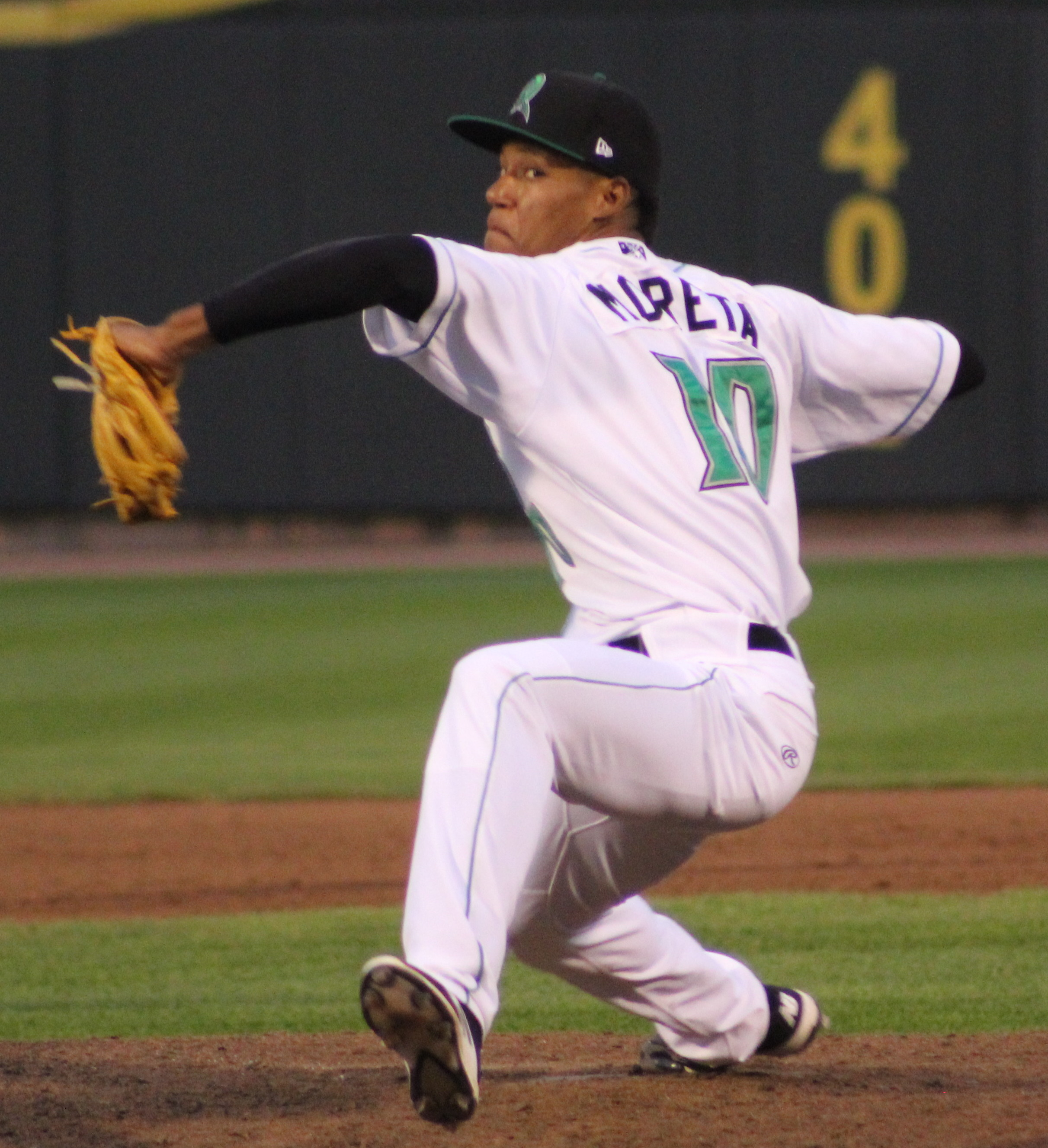
- Moreta with the Dayton Dragons in 2018

Hanshin Tigers – No. 99
- Pitcher
- Born: April 15, 1996 (age 30); Comendador, Dominican Republic
- Bats: Right Throws: Right

Professional debut
- MLB: September 26, 2021, for the Cincinnati Reds
- NPB: March 29, 2026, for the Hanshin Tigers

MLB statistics (through 2025 season)
- Win–loss record: 6–5
- Earned run average: 4.17
- Strikeouts: 138

NPB statistics (through August 19, 2026)
- Win–loss record: 2–2
- Earned run average: 6.19
- Strikeouts: 22
- Stats at Baseball Reference

Teams
- Cincinnati Reds (2021–2022); Pittsburgh Pirates (2023, 2025); Hanshin Tigers (2026–present)

Dauri Michell Moreta (born April 15, 1996) is a Dominican professional baseball pitcher for the Hanshin Tigers of Nippon Professional Baseball (NPB). He has previously played in Major League Baseball (MLB) for the Cincinnati Reds and Pittsburgh Pirates.

== Career ==
=== Cincinnati Reds ===
Moreta signed with the Cincinnati Reds as an international free agent on March 16, 2015. He spent the 2015 season with the Dominican Summer League Reds, going 1–2 with a 1.69 ERA and 30 strikeouts over 21 1/3 innings. Moreta split the 2016 season between the rookie-level Arizona League Reds and the Billings Mustangs, going a combined 3–3 with a 1.89 ERA and 56 strikeouts over 33 1/3 innings. He split the 2017 and 2018 seasons between Billings and the Dayton Dragons; going a combined 1–2 with a 4.31 ERA and 45 strikeouts over 45 1/3 innings in 2017, and 4–3 with a 6.79 ERA and 79 strikeouts over 55 2/3 innings in 2018.

Moreta spent the 2019 season with the Daytona Tortugas, going 1–0 with a 2.35 ERA and 64 strikeouts over 57 1/3 innings. Following the 2019 season, he played for the Glendale Desert Dogs of the Arizona Fall League. Moreta did not play in a game in 2020 due to the cancellation of the minor league season because of the COVID-19 pandemic. Moreta returned to action in 2021 with the Double-A Chattanooga Lookouts and Triple-A Louisville Bats, logging a combined 6–0 record and 1.02 ERA and 58 strikeouts over 53 innings of work.

On September 22, 2021, Cincinnati selected Moreta's contract to the 40-man roster and promoted him to the major leagues for the first time. Moreta made his MLB debut on September 26, tossing a scoreless inning of work against the Washington Nationals. In four appearances for Cincinnati during his rookie campaign, Moreta recorded a 2.45 ERA with four strikeouts across 3 2/3 innings pitched.

On July 14, 2022, Moreta recorded his first career save after logging the final two outs in a game against the New York Yankees. He made 35 appearances for the Reds over the course of the season, compiling an 0–2 record and 5.40 ERA with 39 strikeouts over 38 1/3 innings pitched.

=== Pittsburgh Pirates ===
On November 18, 2022, Moreta was traded to the Pittsburgh Pirates in exchange for Kevin Newman. He made 55 relief outings for the Pirates in 2023, recording a 3.72 ERA with 76 strikeouts across 58 innings pitched.

On March 16, 2024, Moreta was placed on the 60–day injured list with a ligament injury in his pitching elbow. He did not play in a game in 2024, and made rehab appearances with the Single-A Bradenton Marauders and Triple-A Indianapolis Indians during the early stages of the 2025 season. On June 16, 2025, Moreta was activated from the injured list. On September 25, he was optioned back to Indianapolis. In 18 appearances for Pittsburgh, Moreta posted a 1–1 record and 3.24 ERA with 19 strikeouts across 16 2/3 innings pitched. He was designated for assignment by the Pirates on November 18. On November 21, Moreta was non-tendered by Pittsburgh and became a free agent.

=== Hanshin Tigers ===
On December 19, 2025, Moreta signed with the Hanshin Tigers of Nippon Professional Baseball.
