= Ángel Perdomo =

Dominican baseball player (born 1994)

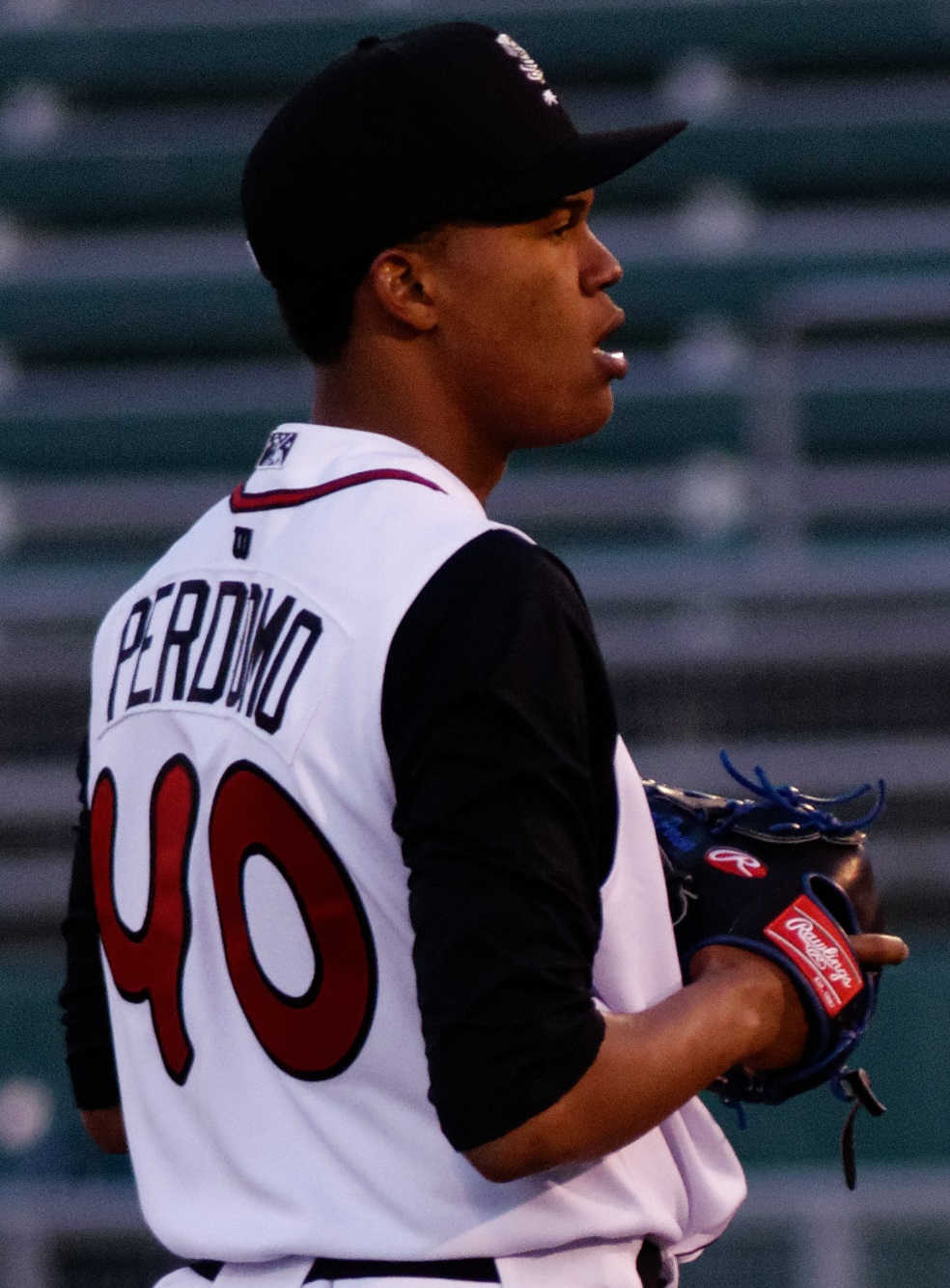
- Perdomo with the Lansing Lugnuts in 2016

Algodoneros de Unión Laguna – No. 26
- Pitcher
- Born: May 7, 1994 (age 32); San Cristóbal, Dominican Republic
- Bats: Left Throws: Left

MLB debut
- August 18, 2020, for the Milwaukee Brewers

MLB statistics (through 2025 season)
- Win–loss record: 4–2
- Earned run average: 5.54
- Strikeouts: 79
- Stats at Baseball Reference

Teams
- Milwaukee Brewers (2020–2021); Pittsburgh Pirates (2023); Athletics (2025)

Ángel David Perdomo (born May 7, 1994) is a Dominican professional baseball pitcher for the Algodoneros de Unión Laguna of the Mexican League. He has previously played in Major League Baseball (MLB) for the Milwaukee Brewers, Pittsburgh Pirates, and Athletics.

== Career ==
=== Toronto Blue Jays ===
Perdomo signed with the Toronto Blue Jays as an international free agent on November 28, 2011. He was assigned to the Dominican Summer League Blue Jays for the 2012 season, where he pitched to a 5.40 earned run average (ERA), 13 strikeouts, and 13 walks in seven games totaling 11 2/3 innings. He remained with the DSL Blue Jays in 2013, pitching 26 2/3 innings and posting a 0–1 win–loss record, 3.04 ERA, and 43 strikeouts. Perdomo was promoted to the Rookie-level Gulf Coast League Blue Jays in 2014, and appeared in 13 games. He would compile a 3–2 record, 2.54 ERA, and 57 strikeouts in 46 innings.

Perdomo began the 2015 minor league season with the Rookie-Advanced Bluefield Blue Jays, and later earned a promotion to the Low-A Vancouver Canadians. He pitched a combined 69 1/3 innings in 2015, and posted a 6–1 record, 2.60 ERA, and 67 strikeouts. Continuing to progress through the Blue Jays minor league system, Perdomo was assigned to the Single-A Lansing Lugnuts to open the 2016 season. In June he was selected to play in the All-Star Futures Game as an injury replacement for Dylan Unsworth. Perdomo made 25 starts and two relief appearances for the Lugnuts in 2016, and posted a 5–7 record, 3.19 ERA, and 156 strikeouts in 127 innings. He played the entire 2017 season with the High-A Dunedin Blue Jays, and went 5–6 with a 3.70 ERA and 65 strikeouts in 75 1/3 innings. Perdomo stayed with Dunedin in 2018, pitching to a 1–5 record, 3.63 ERA, and 100 strikeouts in 79 1/3 innings. He elected free agency on November 2, 2018.

=== Milwaukee Brewers ===
Perdomo signed a minor league contract with the Milwaukee Brewers on November 12, 2018. He split the 2019 season between the Double-A Biloxi Shuckers and Triple-A San Antonio Missions, going a combined 5–2 with a 4.28 ERA over 69 1/3 innings. Perdomo was added to the Brewers 40–man roster on November 2, 2019.

On August 13, 2020, Perdomo was promoted to the major leagues for the first time. He made his MLB debut on August 18 against the Minnesota Twins. In 3 appearances for Milwaukee during his rookie campaign, Perdomo struggled to a 20.25 ERA with 5 strikeouts across 2 2/3 innings pitched.

Perdomo made 19 appearances for the Brewers in 2021, compiling a 1–0 record and 6.35 ERA with 28 strikeouts over 17 innings of work. On August 11, 2021, he was placed on the injured list with a lower back strain, and was later transferred to the 60-day injured list on September 1.

Perdomo began the 2022 campaign in the minor leagues, recording five scoreless appearances for the Triple-A Nashville Sounds and rookie-level Arizona Complex League Brewers.

=== Tampa Bay Rays ===
On July 19, 2022, Perdomo was claimed off waivers by the Tampa Bay Rays. Perdomo was designated for assignment on July 30. He cleared waivers and was sent outright to the Triple-A Durham Bulls on August 4. In 21 appearances for Durham, Perdomo logged a 4–2 record and 2.12 ERA with 48 strikeouts across 29 2/3 innings pitched. He elected free agency following the season on November 10.

=== Pittsburgh Pirates ===
On December 22, 2022, Perdomo signed a minor league contract with the Pittsburgh Pirates. He was assigned to the Triple-A Indianapolis Indians to begin the 2023 season, where he made 20 appearances and registered a 3.18 ERA with 35 strikeouts in 22 2/3 innings pitched. On June 3, 2023, Perdomo had his contract selected to the major league roster. On July 25, Perdomo surrendered a home run to San Diego Padres outfielder Juan Soto. He then intentionally hit the following batter, Manny Machado, with a pitch and was subsequently ejected. The following day, Perdomo was suspended three games for the incident. On August 20, he was placed on the injured list with left elbow discomfort. Four days later, he was transferred to the 60–day injured list, ending his season. In 30 appearances for Pittsburgh, he posted a 3.72 ERA with 44 strikeouts in 29.0 innings of work. On October 6, Perdomo underwent Tommy John surgery, ruling him out for the entirety of the 2024 season. Following the season on November 2, Perdomo was removed from the 40–man roster and sent outright to Triple–A Indianapolis.

=== Athletics ===
On November 6, 2023, Perdomo was claimed off waivers by the Atlanta Braves. However, on November 17, Perdomo was non-tendered by Atlanta, making him a free agent. On December 7, Perdomo re–signed with the Braves on a one–year, split major league contract.

On March 17, 2025, Perdomo was traded to the Los Angeles Angels in exchange for a player to be named later or cash considerations. He was designated for assignment by the Angels on March 25.

On March 30, 2025, Perdomo was claimed off waivers by the Athletics. In 4 appearances for the team, he posted a 5.40 ERA with 2 strikeouts across 3 1/3 innings pitched. Perdomo was designated for assignment by the Athletics on April 12. He cleared waivers and was sent outright to the Triple-A Las Vegas Aviators on April 14. Perdomo elected free agency on October 6.

=== Los Angeles Angels ===
On November 29, 2025, Perdomo signed a minor league contract with the Los Angeles Angels. He made 10 appearances for the Triple-A Salt Lake Bees, struggling to a 12.00 ERA with 12 strikeouts over 12 innings pitched. Perdomo was released by the Angels organization on May 4, 2026.

=== Leones de Yucatán ===
On May 15, 2026, Perdomo signed with the Leones de Yucatán of the Mexican League. In 24 relief appearances, he posted a 0–5 record with a 4.50 ERA and 34 strikeouts across 22 innings pitched.

=== Algodoneros de Unión Laguna ===
On July 17, 2026, Perdomo was traded to the Dorados de Chihuahua of the Mexican League, who subsequently traded him to the Algodoneros de Unión Laguna.
