= Cody Bolton =

American baseball player (born 1998)

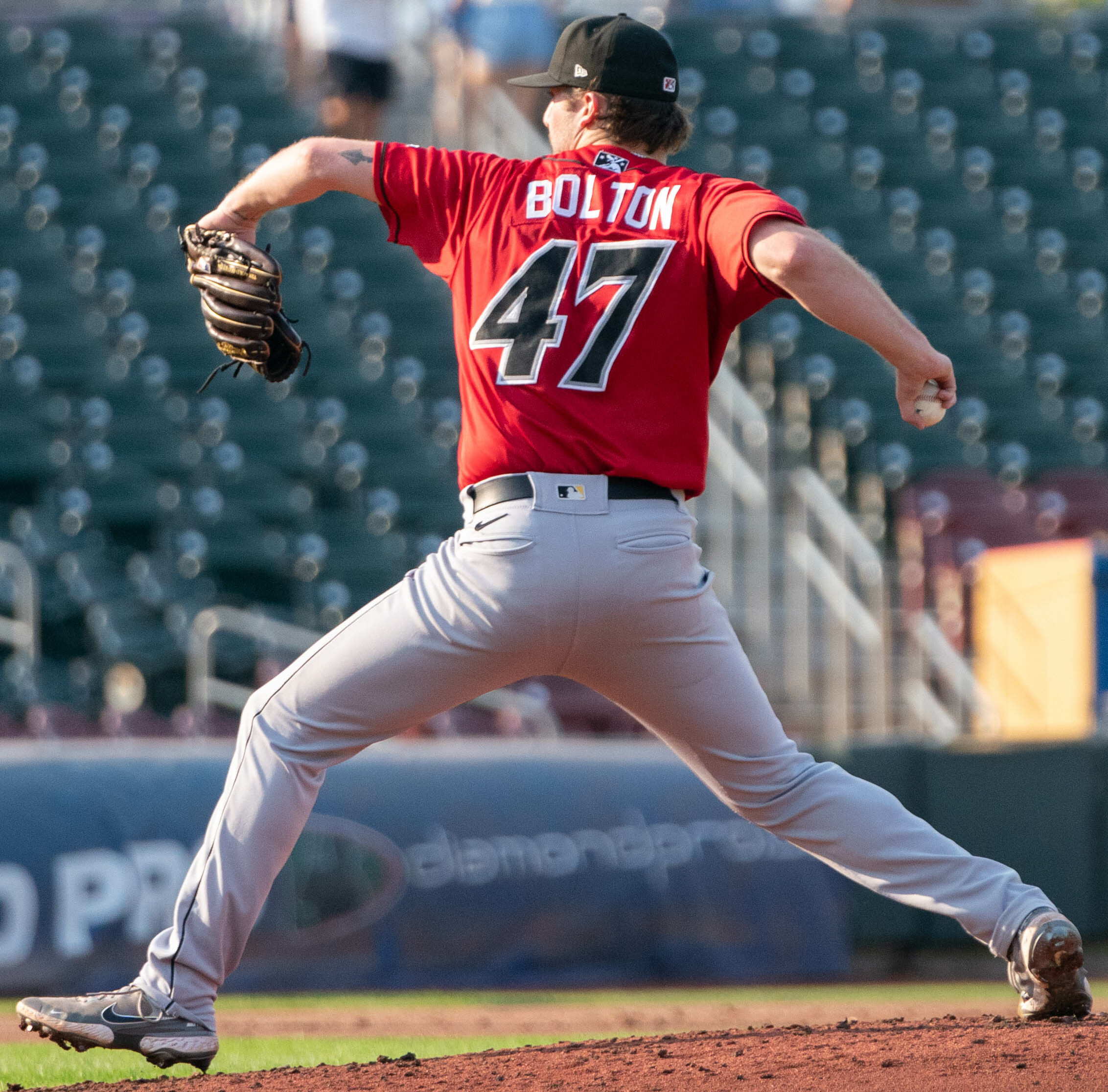
- Bolton with the Indianapolis Indians in 2022

Free agent
- Pitcher
- Born: June 19, 1998 (age 28); Richmond, Virginia, U.S.
- Bats: Right Throws: Right

MLB debut
- April 29, 2023, for the Pittsburgh Pirates

MLB statistics (through 2026 season)
- Win–loss record: 1–1
- Earned run average: 5.66
- Strikeouts: 62
- Stats at Baseball Reference

Teams
- Pittsburgh Pirates (2023); Seattle Mariners (2024); Cleveland Guardians (2025); Houston Astros (2026)

Carl Donovan "Cody" Bolton (born June 19, 1998) is an American professional baseball pitcher who is a free agent. He has previously played in Major League Baseball (MLB) for the Pittsburgh Pirates, Seattle Mariners, Cleveland Guardians, and Houston Astros.

== Amateur career ==
Bolton attended Tracy High School in Tracy, California. As a senior in 2017, he went 9–2 with a 1.13 ERA, striking out 97 batters in 68 innings and was named league MVP. In high school, he was 24–6 with a 1.42 ERA, helping the Bulldogs win two league titles and two division titles. He committed to play college baseball at the University of Michigan and ranked as one of the top 120 high school prospects by Perfect Game.

== Professional career ==
=== Pittsburgh Pirates ===
The Pittsburgh Pirates drafted Bolton in the sixth round of the 2017 Major League Baseball draft. He signed with the team, receiving a $300,000 bonus and forgoing his college commitment.

Bolton made his professional debut with the Rookie-level Gulf Coast League Pirates. In nine starts, he pitched to a 3.16 ERA. Bolton spent 2018 with the West Virginia Power of the Single-A South Atlantic League, going 3–3 with a 3.65 ERA in nine starts. He began 2019 with the Bradenton Marauders of the High-A Florida State League, where he was named Pitcher of the Week on May 13 and later an All-Star. He was promoted to the Altoona Curve of the Double-A Eastern League in June. Over 21 starts between the two clubs, Bolton went 8–6 with a 3.28 ERA, striking out 102 over 101 2/3 innings.

Bolton was one of the Pirates top 10 prospects entering 2020 and 2021 but he was unable to pitch competitively in either year. The 2020 minor league season was cancelled because of the COVID-19 pandemic. Bolton began the 2021 season on the injured list with a knee injury and underwent surgery on his meniscus in May, forcing him to miss the whole season.

Bolton was the Opening Night started for the Triple-A Indianapolis Indians in 2022. He went 4-2 with a 3.09 ERA and 82 strikeouts over 75 2/3 innings with Indianapolis. Bolton's usage changed after recovering from his knee injury. While he made 14 starts out of his 30 appearances in 2022, he never pitched more than 5 innings in an outing and did not throw more than 60 innings after June. Beginning in 2023, Bolton was a full-time reliever, occasionally making short starts as an opener. Bolton began 2023 back in Indianapolis, where he made 8 relief appearances and posted a 2.38 ERA with 14 strikeouts in 11 1/3 innings pitched.

On April 26, 2023, Bolton was selected to the 40-man roster and promoted to the major leagues for the first time. He debuted on April 29, pitching two scoreless innings against the Washington Nationals in the second game of a doubleheader. Bolton with the Pirates in seven different stints in 2023, frequently getting sent down to Triple-A. He made 16 appearances for the Pirates during his rookie campaign, but struggled to a 6.33 ERA with 22 strikeouts across 21 1/3 innings of work. Bolton's fastball had above average velocity at 95.2 miles per hour, but batters had a .378 batting average against his fastball.

=== Seattle Mariners ===
On November 2, 2023, Bolton was traded to the Seattle Mariners in exchange for cash considerations. Bolton pitched on Opening Day for the Mariners in 2024, allowing a run in two innings, but he could not keep his spot on the roster. He was placed on the injured list on April 8, returning to the Mariners on April 21 and pitching in 11 games over the next month. He was sent down to the Tacoma Rainiers on May 23. He returned to the Mariners in June, pitching in two games before staying in Triple-A for the rest of the season. With the Mariners, Bolton had no decisions and a 4.34 ERA in 18 2/3 innings. In Tacoma, he was 1–2 with two saves and a 3.07 ERA in 33 games. Bolton replaced his four-seam fastball for with a cutter and a sinker than had more movement but less velocity and caused more batters to swing and miss.

Bolton was optioned to Triple-A Tacoma to begin the 2025 season. In two appearances for Tacoma, he struggled to a 9.00 ERA with one strikeout and one save over two innings of work. Bolton was designated for assignment by Seattle on April 5, 2025.

=== Cleveland Guardians ===
On April 8, 2025, Bolton was traded to the Cleveland Guardians in exchange for cash considerations. He made one appearance for Cleveland, allowing three runs on four hits with one strikeout across two innings pitched. Bolton was designated for assignment by the Guardians on May 31 after sustaining injuries in a car accident involving a semi-truck while en route to Triple-A Columbus. He was released by the Guardians on June 6.

=== Houston Astros ===
On July 24, 2025, Bolton signed a minor league contract with the Houston Astros. He made five appearances over the remainder of the season, splitting time between the Single-A Fayetteville Woodpeckers and Triple-A Sugar Land Space Cowboys.

Bolton was invited to spring training in 2026, but did not make the team and was assigned to Sugar Land to begin the year. On March 30, 2026, the Astros selected Bolton's contract, adding him to their active roster. He made eight appearances for Houston, tallying a 0–1 record and 5.40 ERA with 22 strikeouts and one save across 20 innings pitched. On May 18, Bolton was designated for assignment by the Astros. He cleared waivers and was sent outright to Sugar Land on May 21. Bolton had a 4.66 ERA across eight games with Sugar Land while missing much of the season with injury. He elected free agency on November 2.

== Personal life ==
Bolton's father is a Baptist pastor, and his mother has been active in church activities. Bolton has two sisters. The Bolton family moved from Virginia, where Cody was born, to California in 2007. His family was in attendance at his MLB debut in 2023.

Bolton played quarterback and wide receiver in football as a child before committing to baseball as a 14-year-old.

While in high school, Bolton said his favorite baseball players were Clayton Kershaw and Albert Pujols. One of Bolton's high school coaches brought a toilet to the team's dugout, so that players could "flush" out a poor performance.
