= Flag of Milwaukee =

Milwaukee
- Use: Civil flag
- Adopted: 1954
- Designed by: Fred Steffan

The flag of Milwaukee was adopted by its Common Council in 1954.

The flag of Milwaukee is little-used around the city; the city only owns twenty flags which are displayed at various city-owned buildings. A 2004 survey by the North American Vexillological Association rated the Milwaukee flag 147th out of 150 flags of major American cities.

== Description ==
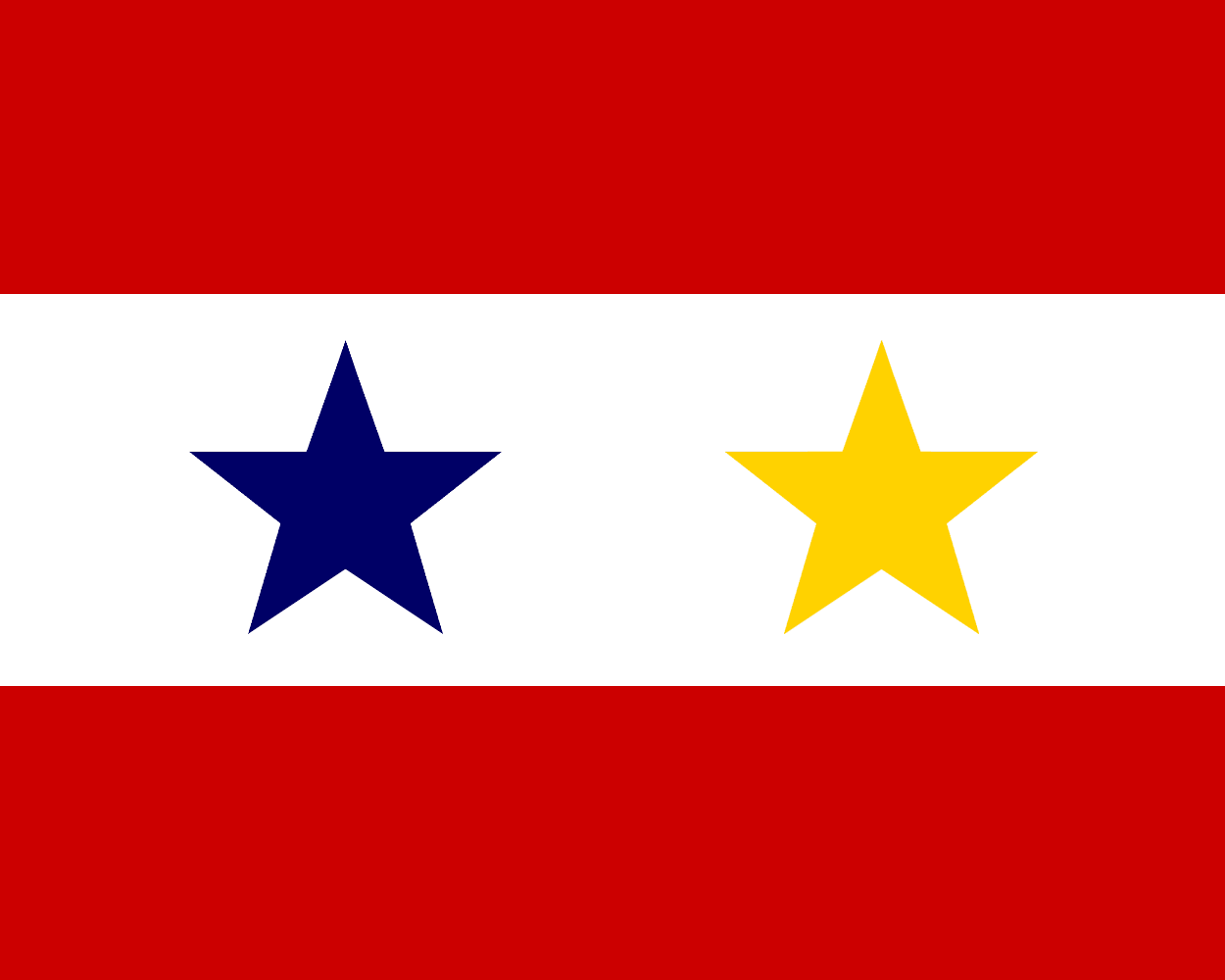
The small Civil War-era flag found on the flag of Milwaukee

The flag displays symbols of Milwaukee on a medium blue background, with the city name below all the elements. In the center, a gear, representing industry, bears symbols of Milwaukee's identity and history. An Indian head, resembling the Milwaukee Braves logo at the time, represents Native American origins. The flag contains an image of another flag, this one red/white/red stripes with two stars. Identified as the Civil War battle flag of a Milwaukee regiment, it has also been suggested that this represents a service flag, although it lacks the red border. A lamp symbol in the upper right was once associated with the Milwaukee City Library. Below this is Milwaukee City Hall, representing government, which is flanked by abstract outlines of the Basilica of St. Josaphat to represent the city's churches, housing, a factory, the Milwaukee Arena, and the former County Stadium (demolished in 2001) along a straight shoreline with waves representing Lake Michigan. The golden barley stalk on the left represents Milwaukee's brewing history, and the red ship with water symbolizes Milwaukee's status as a port city, with the 1846 date of city incorporation from the merger with Byron Kilbourn's Kilbourntown and Solomon Juneau's Juneautown on the flag's right vertically.

== History ==
Milwaukee has had a series of city flags, some official and some only proposed, both before and after the current design was adopted.

=== First proposals ===
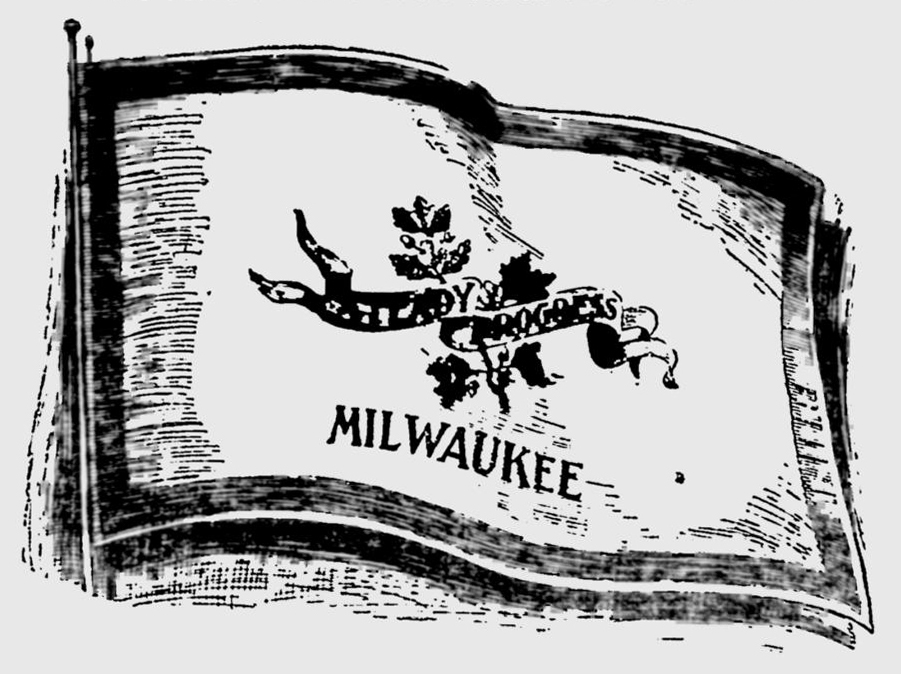
Grayscale version of the 1897 contest winner, as published in the Milwaukee Journal on January 10, 1898

The first attempt to introduce a civic flag came in an 1897 Milwaukee Journal contest. The winning entry, designed by John Amberg, included an oak branch with the motto "Steady Progress" over a cream-colored field. Mr. Amberg was awarded the first prize of $15. The design was praised by then-mayor William C. Rauschenberger, who lost reelection shortly thereafter. The flag was never officially adopted.

=== Initial designs ===
"Municipal Flag of Milwaukee", as described in press accounts from 1909

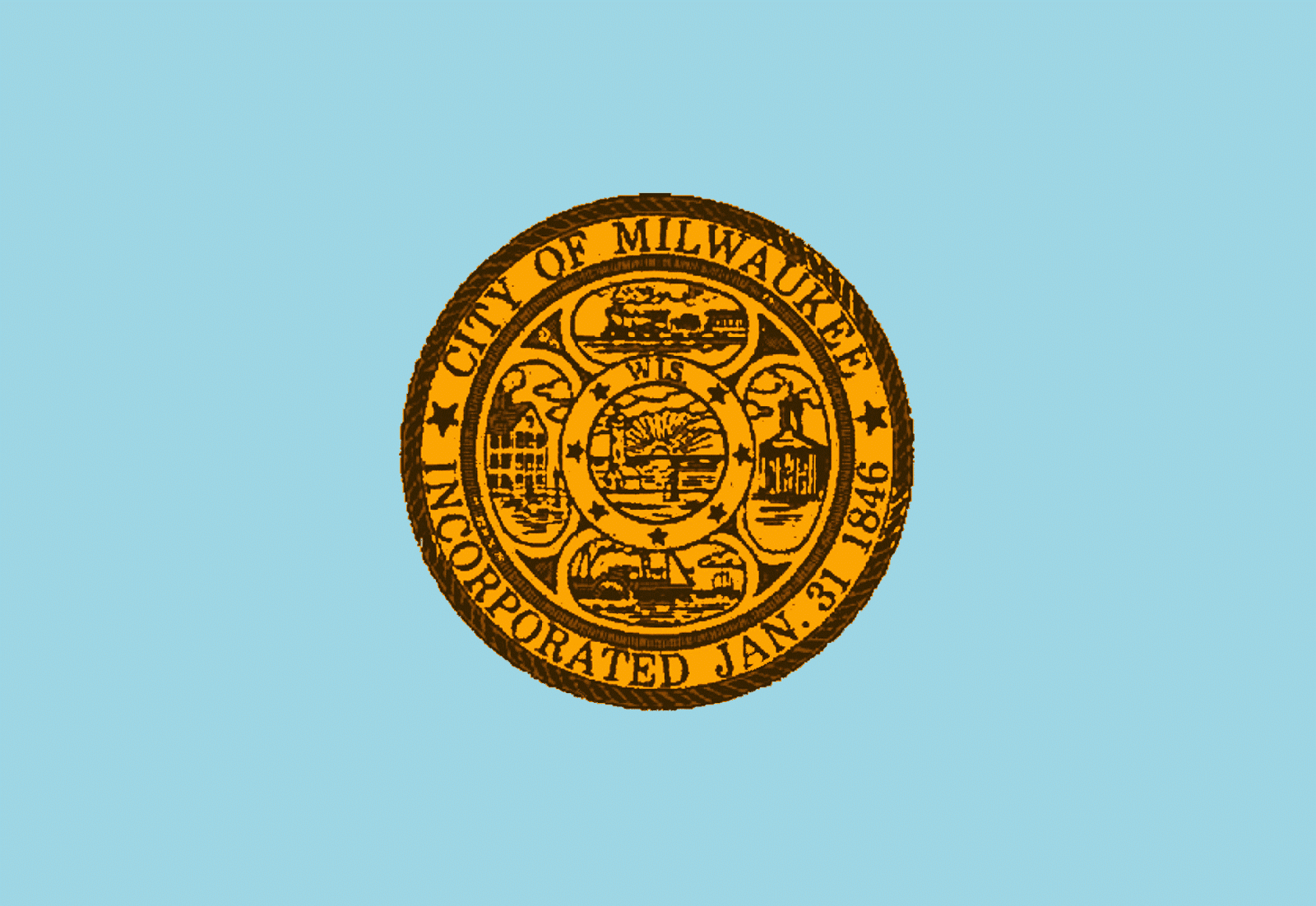
Flag adopted in 1927 and used by the Milwaukee Police Department for ceremonial use

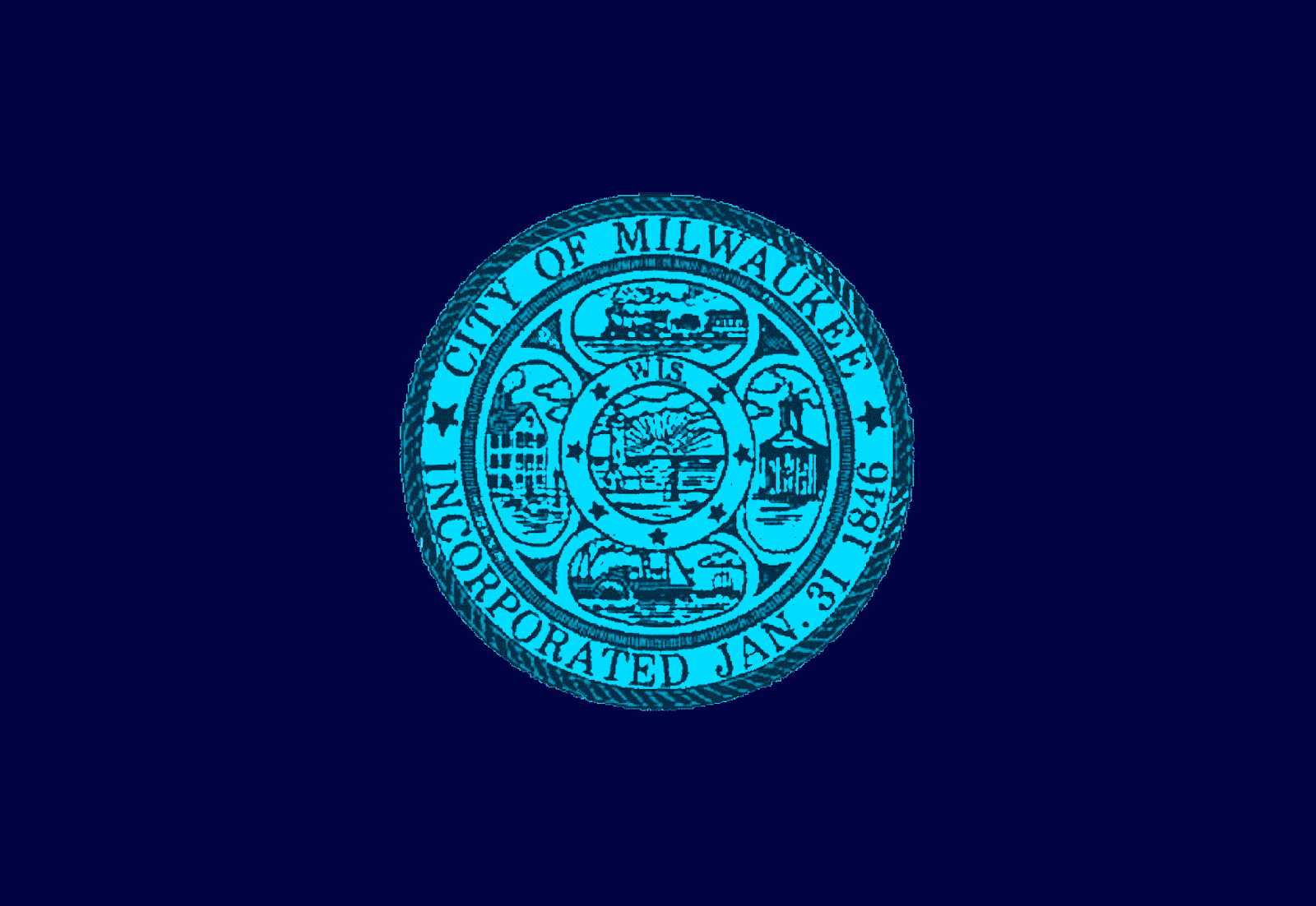
Variant version given to the Milwaukee Fire Department

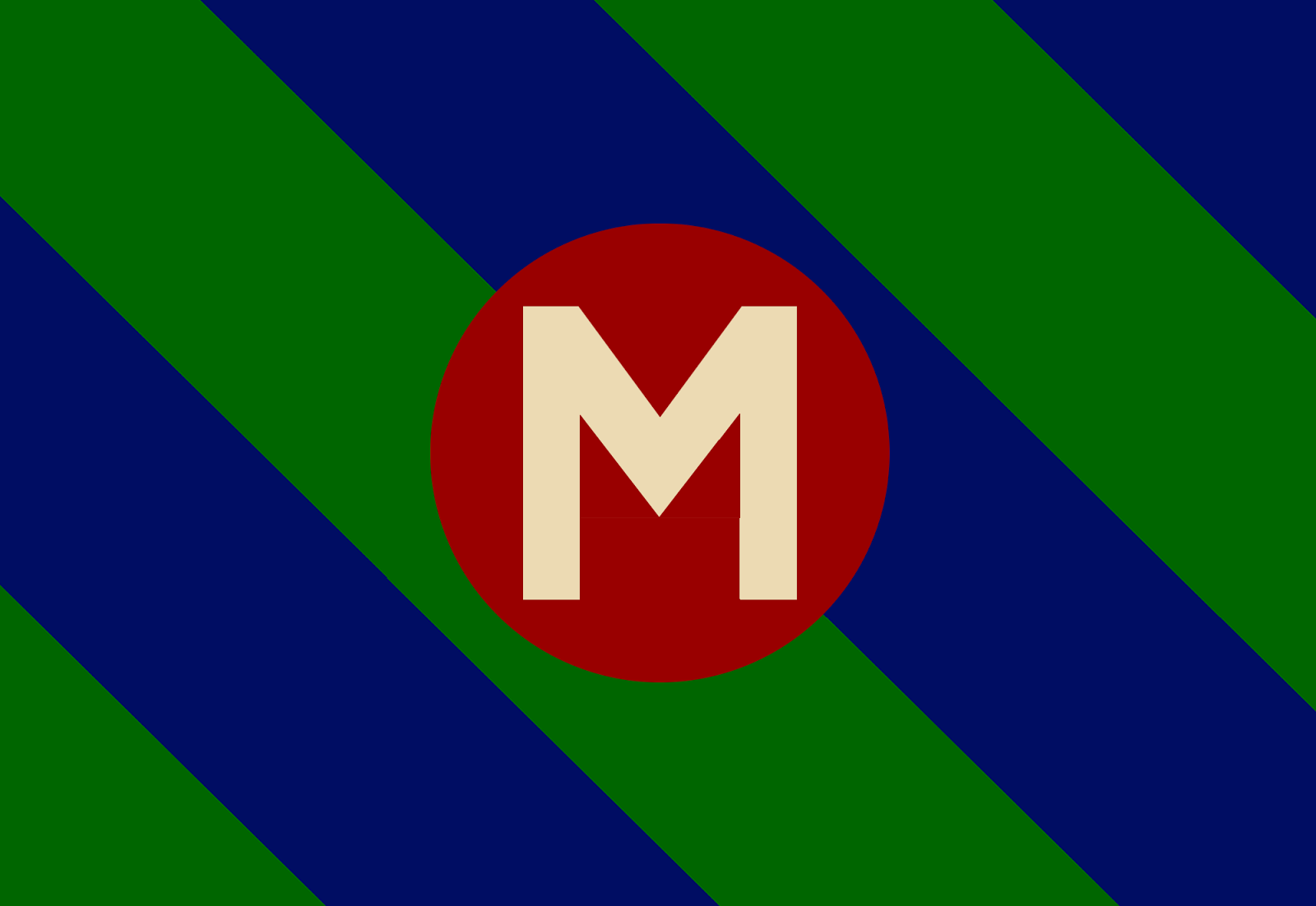
Flag designed for MS Milwaukee ceremony in 1928

In 1909, press accounts described "the municipal flag of Milwaukee" as being blue with a red circle and white "M", possibly related to the red-circle iconography of the city's "Milwaukee: a Bright Spot" advertising campaign of the early 1900s.

This flag appears to have fallen out of favor shortly thereafter; in 1917, Alderman Frederick C. Bogk called for commissioning a city flag as part of an ambitious plan for Milwaukee's growth, along with expanding the harbor, investing in infrastructure, preserving residential districts, and annexing the innermost suburbs. The flag never came to fruition.

In 1927, a group of citizens created their own flag, a field of Alice blue with the city seal in golden orange in the center. The flag was submitted to the Common Council, adopted, and given to the Milwaukee Police Department for its exclusive use in parades. A dark blue/light blue version was created for the Fire Department. Over time, the police and fire department flags fell into disuse, and neither was used to represent the city as a whole.

The following year, the Hamburg America cruise line decided to christen its newest ship the MS Milwaukee, and the company requested Milwaukee's city flag be brought to Germany for her launching ceremony. Rather than send the Alice blue flag introduced just the year before, the city considered a new flag design, incorporating alternating angled bars of green and blue emblazoned with a cream-colored "M" over a red circle.

=== Milwaukee Centurama ===
Milwaukee Centurama flag

Efforts continued to introduce a new permanent city flag. In 1942, Alderman Fred P. Meyers introduced a new resolution in the Common Council proposing "a special city flag committee composed of aldermen and public-spirited citizens who, with the co-operation of the art commission and other art institutions would be commissioned to recommend a design to be ready for Milwaukee's one hundred birthday" on January 31, 1946. The anniversary came and went without any action from the council itself, although a flag was created for the city's "Centurama" anniversary celebration. It featured the Centurama logo, a Janus-like two-faced figure rising from the waters of Lake Michigan, with one face facing the left "saluting the past", and the other gazing right over an outstretched finger "challenging the future". The design, by local commercial artist Earl H. Martyn, was selected in a competition. Martyn won a first prize of $75.

=== 1950 design contest ===
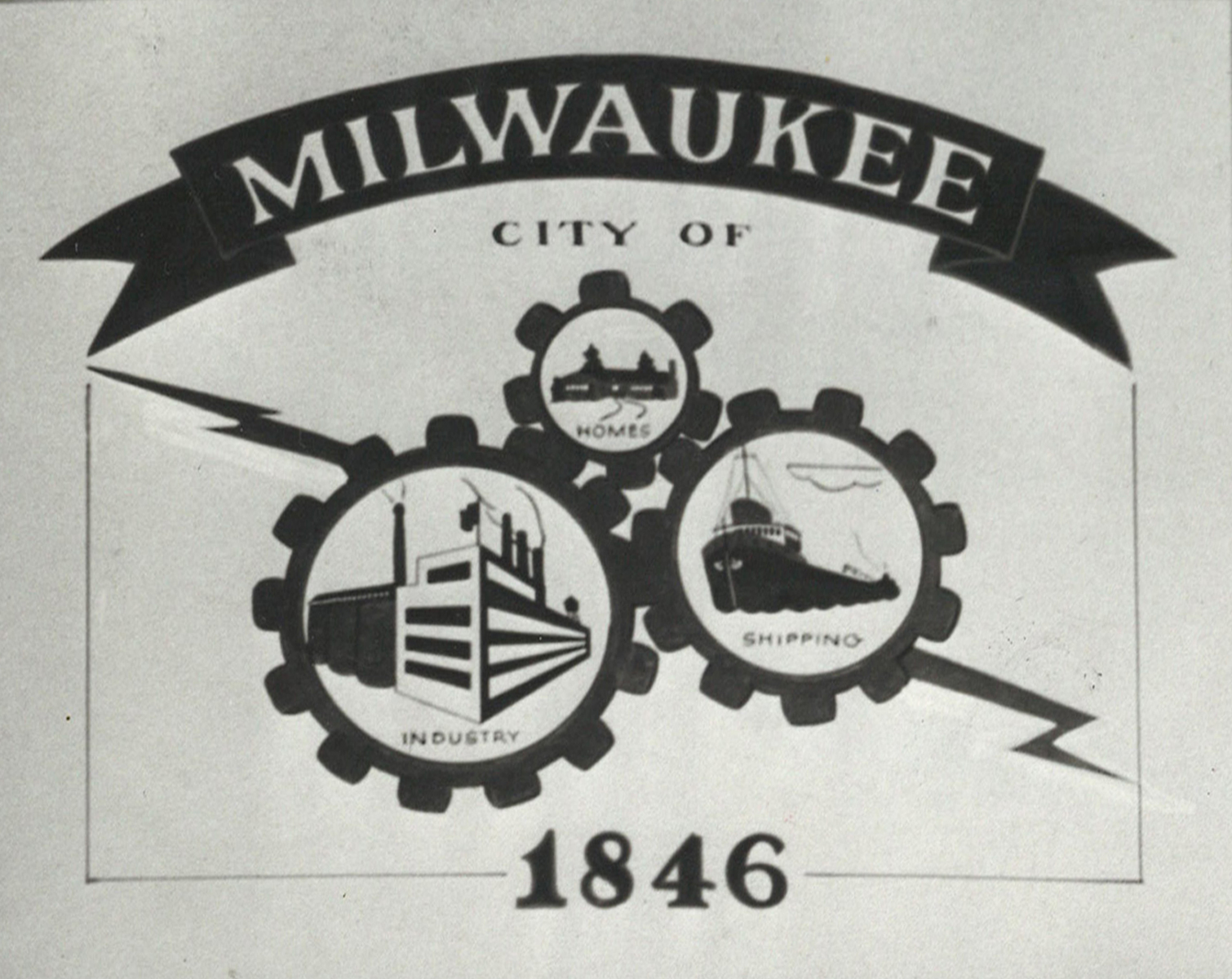
Grayscale version of the 1950 contest winner

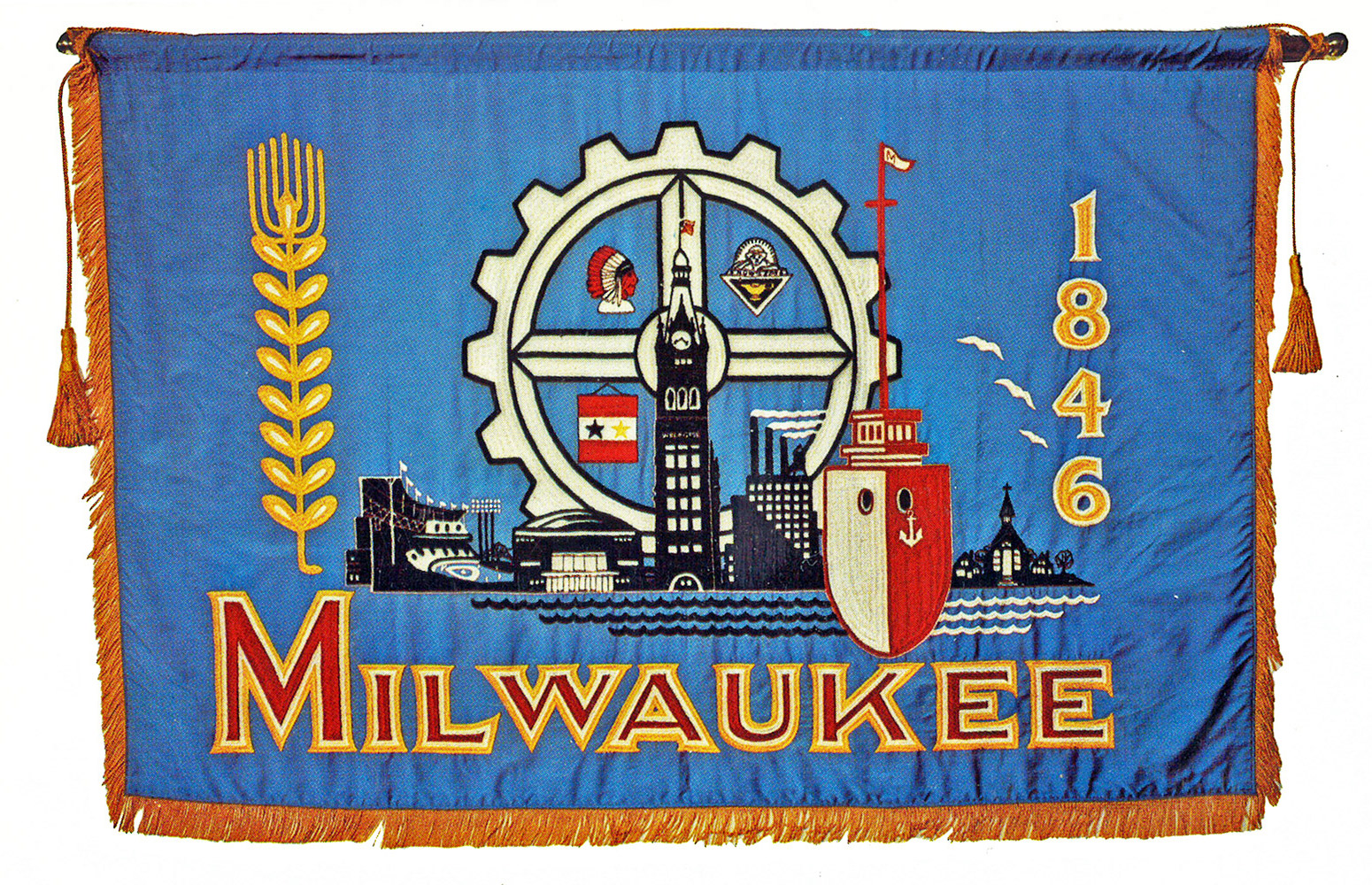
Final design adopted by Milwaukee, as hung in the Common Council chamber

In 1950, Alderman Meyers re-introduced his proposed bill. City leaders recognized that Milwaukee was one of only four cities at the time with a population over 500,000 but without a flag, and so the city held its first official contest for flag designs. The winner was 17-year old Milwaukeean Alfred P. Dannenmann, who created a flag featuring three interlocking gears labeled "HOMES", "INDUSTRY", and "SHIPPING" between a banner reading "MILWAUKEE" and the date "1846". Dannenmann was awarded a $100 savings bond, but his design was not officially adopted by the city. Instead, the city's art commission decided to design a new flag itself, incorporating elements of several entries from the previous year's contest.

Former alderman Fred Steffan, who had served on the Council during the 1950 contest but was by then working as a commercial artist for the Joseph Schlitz Brewing Company, combined various elements from the 1950 contest winner along with other city landmarks to create a new design, which was officially approved by the Common Council on September 21, 1954. The city ordered one single flag for display in the Common Council chambers. This flag, measuring three feet high and five feet wide and trimmed in gold fringe, was manufactured by local sporting goods company C.A. Burghardt & Sons, who had submitted the low bid of $186.41 ($2,197.79 in 2024 dollars). Burghardt & Sons delivered the flag to the Council on January 25, 1955, who placed it on display.

The city made flags available for purchase by the public in 1969, but the design never went into wide usage.

Steffan's original rendering presented to the Common Council, which he had painted on acrylic on paper, was believed lost until found in August 2021 by Milwaukee City Clerk Jim Owczarski while cleaning out the city archives. The city intends to preserve the painting and digitize it, in part to correct the inaccurate version found on Wikipedia.

=== 1975 re-design contest ===
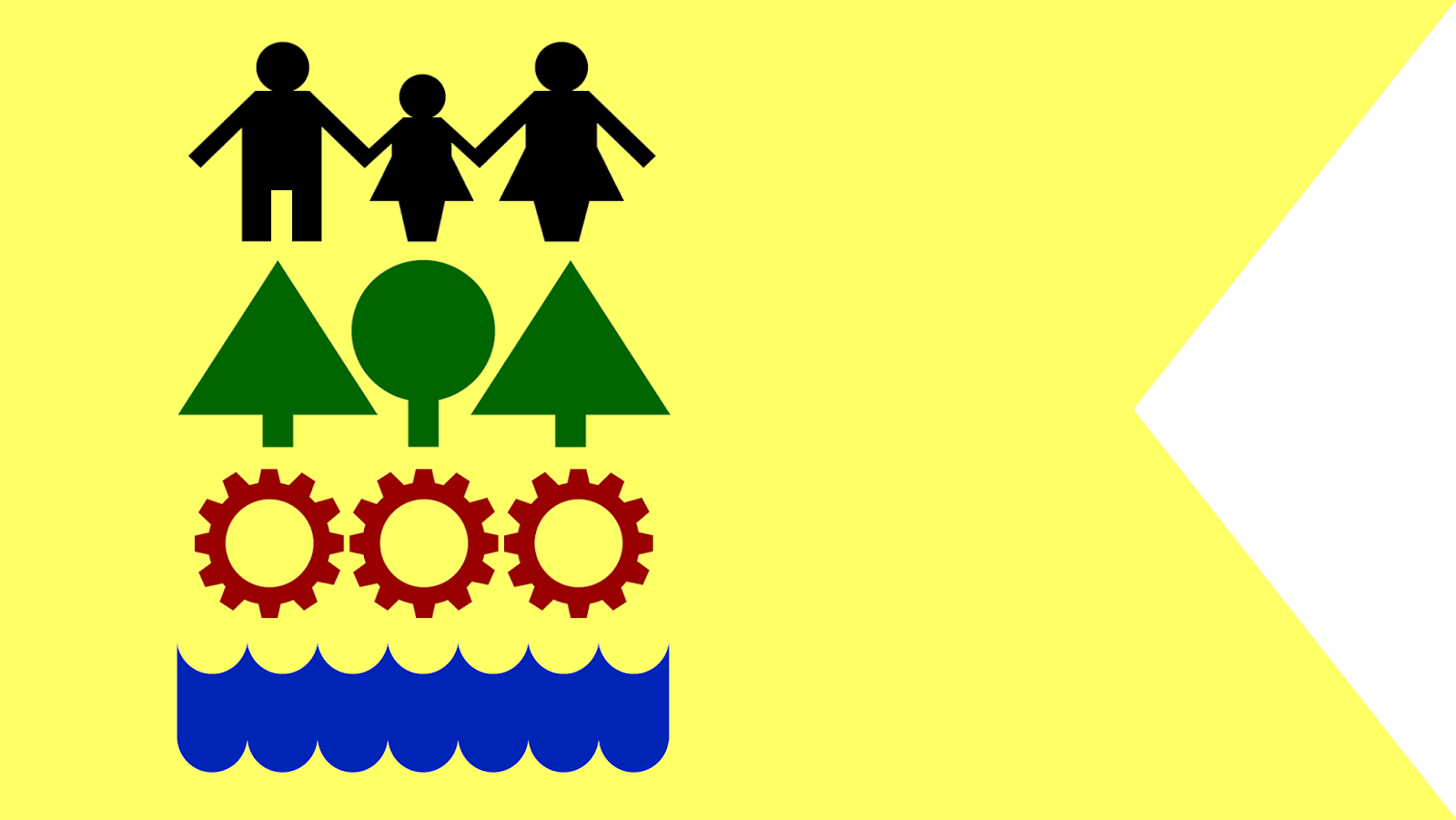
1975 flag contest winner

Twenty years after Steffan's flag was adopted, it was deemed outdated and too visually complicated. In 1975 the city held another contest for a new flag design. Lee Tishler, a Milwaukee Public Museum employee, won with a bright yellow swallowtail banner featuring bold symbols of civic life: people, parks, industry and lakefront. Although Tishler was awarded the contest's prize of a $100 savings bond in a ceremony at City Hall, his flag was not adopted.

=== 2001 re-design contest ===
In 2001, the Milwaukee Arts Board of the Milwaukee Common Council held a contest to attract designs for a new flag. Over 105 designs were submitted, but none met with the approval of the board. The board voted unanimously to forward five finalists to the Common Council, along with a recommendation that the Common Council reject them all, and Steffan's flag was retained. In a 2004 poll conducted by the North American Vexillological Association, the flag of Milwaukee was rated the fourth worst of all major cities in the United States.

=== "The People's Flag" ===
"Sunrise Over the Lake" by Robert Lenz, winner of the 2016 People's Flag of Milwaukee design contest

In 2015, in response to negative media coverage spurred by a 99% Invisible episode, Steve Kodis, a local graphic designer, partnered with Greater Together, an AIGA-affiliated non-profit, to launch a flag contest called "The People's Flag of Milwaukee".

Before the contest winner was announced, there was some pushback over the need to create a new city flag. One local columnist wondered if a new design would even catch on with the public, or would be quickly abandoned as past proposals had been.

Finalists

"Cream City Star" - Jon Grider.

"Golden Arrow" - Chanya Hughes.

"M-Star" - DeChazier Stokes-Johnson.

"Sunrise Over the Lake" - Robert Lenz. (Winner)

"Three Rivers" - Cameron Pothier.

The public submitted 1,006 entries, from which five finalists were chosen in 2016. In an online poll of over 6,000 people, a design called "Sunrise Over the Lake" received the highest rating of the five. The flag's design is described as follows:

The rising sun over Lake Michigan symbolizes a new day. The light blue bars in its reflection represent the city's three rivers ... and three founding towns ... . Gold represents our brewing history and white symbolizes peace.

On July 19, 2018, the Milwaukee Common Council's Steering and Rules Committee took up a proposal to designate the People's Flag of Milwaukee as the city's new official flag. That committee voted 6–2 to revisit the proposal at another meeting by the end of the year. In November of that year, the City of Milwaukee's Arts Board said the original search for a new flag was not inclusive enough, with the relatively small number of judges and voters involved in the process. At least one Milwaukee politician charged that the contest had not made enough efforts to include individuals without internet access. Alderwoman Chantia Lewis said it would not be fair to let "15 people change the entire flag for 600,000 people". Alderman Russell Stamper questioned whether the campaign represented the entire city, and then-Alderman Bob Donovan reported that only one constituent had reached out to him about the flag issue, and that person was opposed to changing the current flag. The Arts Board recommended starting over from scratch.

Despite the inaction from city officials, the People's Flag was quickly embraced by the citizens of Milwaukee. The organizers of the contest released the design into the public domain, deciding to let the flag gain popular acceptance before pushing for official recognition. Since its introduction, the People's Flag has been adopted by local businesses and used on commercial products from bicycles to microbrew labels. The Milwaukee Brewers sell merchandise featuring a combination of the flag image and their logo.

This commercial availability, and the demand driving it, has led the People's Flag to become "a near-ubiquitous symbol across town", even without being officially adopted by the city government.

In July 2024, the Milwaukee Common Council decided to revisit the issue, with District 11 Alderman Peter Burgelis introducing a resolution to formally adopt the People's Flag as the official flag of Milwaukee. On September 9, 2024, The Steering and Rules Committee voted 5–3 to send the resolution to the full Common Council for a vote.

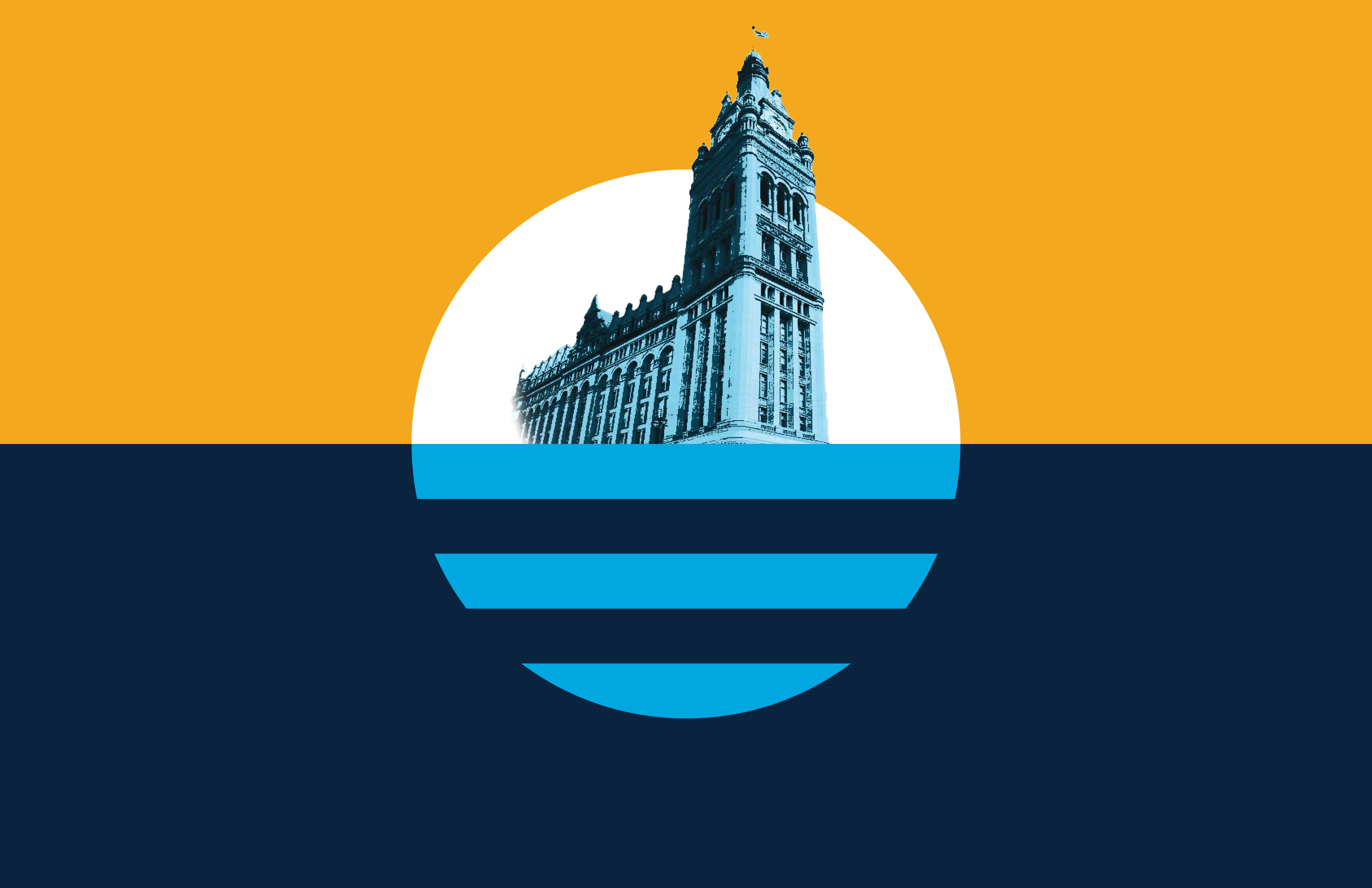
Alderman Robert J. Bauman's modified version of "Sunrise Over the Lake"

On September 19, 2024, Alderman Robert J. Bauman, who had opposed bringing the flag to a vote, introduced his own version of the People's Flag. In a move reminiscent of former alderman Fred Steffan's collage-style design, Bauman superimposed a photo of Milwaukee's City Hall on top of the design, to "(enhance) the flag's association with the City of Milwaukee". This design was met with derision when released, with news outlets asking "if he was being serious". OnMilwaukee.com noted that its coverage of his press release was "not a mis-scheduled April Fool's post."

Bauman's suggestion inspired a series of humorous posts online, with commenters slapping all manner of "local symbols" (including sports figures, convenience stores, and a prominent Milwaukee attorney) to the People's Flag. Some noted that Bauman himself was replicating Steffan's 1954 process by trying to combine discordant and clashing elements into one design.

On September 24, 2024, Bauman's design was rejected by the Common Council by a 12–3 vote. Bauman was able to delay the vote on adopting "Sunrise Over the Lake" on a procedural matter over the estimated $917 it would take to replace the city's twenty physical copies of the official flag. The decision on the original People's Flag proposal was once again postponed by the Council on October 15. On November 6, the motion for the changing of the flag was sent back to the Steering & Rules Committee due back on 13 November 2024.

=== Milwaukee City Flag Task Force ===
On June 17, 2025, Alderman Peter Burgelis proposed a resolution to create the eight-member Milwaukee City Flag Task Force to manage a new campaign to choose a new flag design. On June 24, 2025, the Common Council approved the resolution. The first meeting of the task force took place on July 14. The task force, which includes members with backgrounds in art, history, business, tourism and community development, is chaired by Venice Williams. The task force also announced a plan to open a design submission process by the end of July 2025. After narrowing down 10 finalist flag designs, the plan was for the Common Council to vote on the recommendations by Dec. 31, 2025, so that a new flag would be adopted by the 140th birthday of Milwaukee on January 31, 2026. However, in early December 2025 Urban Milwaukee reported that the process had stalled due to bureaucratic hurdles. As of June 2026, a new flag design has not yet been submitted to the council.
