= Milwaukee Brewers =

Major League Baseball franchise in Milwaukee, Wisconsin

- 2026 Milwaukee Brewers season

Logo	Cap insignia
- Established in 1969; Based in Milwaukee since 1970

Major league affiliations
- National League (1998–present); Central Division (1998–present); American League (1969–1997); Central Division (1994–1997); East Division (1972–1993); West Division (1969–1971)

Current uniform
- Retired numbers: 1; 4; 19; 34; 44; 42

Colors
- Navy blue, yellow, royal blue

Name
- Milwaukee Brewers (1970–present); Seattle Pilots (1969)

Nicknames
- The Brew Crew; Los Cerveceros; Harvey's Wallbangers (1982)

Ballpark
- American Family Field (2001–present); Milwaukee County Stadium (1970–2000); Sick's Stadium (1969)

Major league titles
- World Series titles (1): 2026
- NL pennants (1): 2026
- AL pennants (1): 1982
- NL Central division titles (7): 2011; 2018; 2021; 2023; 2024; 2025; 2026
- AL East division titles (1): 1981; 1982
- Wild card berths (3): 2008; 2019; 2020

Front office
- Principal owner: Mark Attanasio
- President: Rick Schlesinger
- President of baseball operations: Matt Arnold
- General manager: Matt Arnold
- Manager: Pat Murphy
- Website: mlb.com/brewers

The Milwaukee Brewers are an American professional baseball team based in Milwaukee. The Brewers compete in Major League Baseball (MLB) as a member club of the National League (NL) Central Division. The team's name, which alludes to the city's beer industry, has been used by several other baseball teams that have called Milwaukee home. Since 2001, the Brewers have played their home games at the 41,900-seat American Family Field, which was named Miller Park through the 2020 season.

The team was founded as the Seattle Pilots, an expansion team that joined the American League (AL) and began play in Seattle, Washington, as part of the 1969 MLB expansion. The Pilots played their home games at Sick's Stadium. After one season, the team moved to Milwaukee and started playing their home games at Milwaukee County Stadium as the Milwaukee Brewers. The team first recorded a winning season in 1978, the first season with the pairing of Hall of Fame players Robin Yount and Paul Molitor. They clinched their first postseason appearance in 1981, when Rollie Fingers became the first Brewer to win the MVP Award. The next year, bolstered by Yount's MVP-winning play, the Brewers won the American League pennant to reach their first World Series, which they lost in seven games. While the team had a few winning seasons in subsequent years, they did not reach the postseason again for more than two decades.

The Brewers remained in the American League through the 1997 season, then joined the National League in 1998. With sluggers Prince Fielder and Ryan Braun, the team won the Wild Card in 2008 and won the NL Central title in 2011. The 2018 acquisition of Christian Yelich helped the team become a consistent presence in the playoffs. From 2018 to 2026, the Brewers reached the postseason eight times, including three appearances in the NLCS against the Los Angeles Dodgers. Bolstered by ace pitcher Jacob Misiorowski and a small-ball approach, the 2026 Brewers won more than 100 games for the first time on their way to the National League pennant. In the World Series, the Brewers defeated the Tampa Bay Rays to win their first championship and end a 57-year World Series drought.

From 1969 through 2026, the Brewers' overall regular-season win–loss record is 4,508–4,654–4 (.492). Since moving to Milwaukee in 1970, they have an overall win–loss record of 4,444–4,556–3 (.494) through the end of 2026. The Brewers have qualified for the postseason 12 times and won one AL pennant, one NL pennant, eight division titles, and three wild card berths.

== History ==
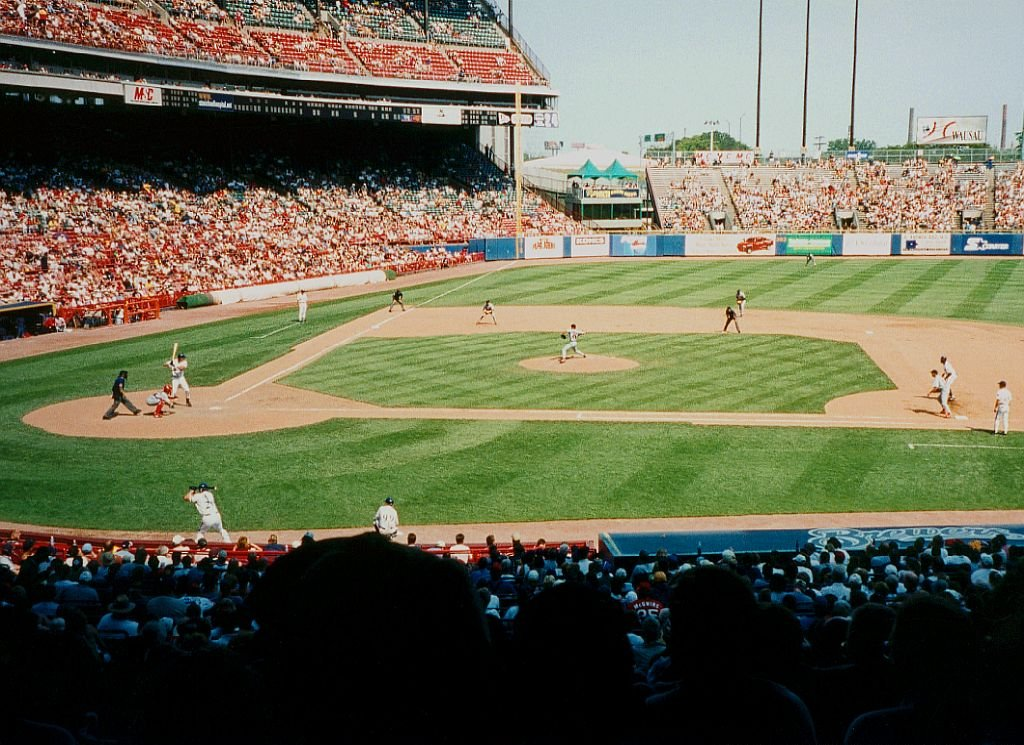
Milwaukee County Stadium, home ballpark from 1970 to 2000

Milwaukee had been an American League city, albeit briefly, when the original Milwaukee Brewers became an AL charter team in 1901 before moving to St. Louis to become the Browns the following season. Between 1902 and 1952, Milwaukee was home to the Milwaukee Brewers of the American Association (AAA) and the Milwaukee Bears of the Negro National League. Both clubs played at Borchert Field. It became a National League city when the Boston Braves moved to Milwaukee in 1953 to become the Milwaukee Braves and played there until 1965.

Today's Milwaukee Brewers originated as an expansion team in 1969, in Seattle, Washington. The Seattle Pilots played for one season in the American League West Division before being acquired in bankruptcy court by Bud Selig, who moved the team to Milwaukee. Renamed the Brewers, they played in the West Division for three years. Before the 1972 season, the Brewers agreed to switch to the American League East Division to make room for the Texas Rangers who, as the Washington Senators, had moved from Washington, D.C.

In 1981, Milwaukee won the American League East in the second half of the strike-shortened season. Rollie Fingers became the first Brewer and first relief pitcher in the history of the American League to win the MVP Award. In the playoffs, they lost the Division Series to the New York Yankees, three games to two. In 1982, Milwaukee, led by AL MVP Robin Yount, won the American League East Division and the American League Pennant, earning their first World Series appearance and only American League pennant. In the Series, they lost to the St. Louis Cardinals in seven games. This was the last playoff appearance for the team for the next two decades, during which they won 90 games in just two seasons. In 1994, the Brewers moved to the new American League Central division.

In 1998, the Brewers moved to the National League. The 2007 season saw them miss out on the NL Central title by two games, their closest finish to a division title since 1988 and also their first winning season since 1992. In 2008, under interim manager Dale Sveum (who won seven of 12 games) for the first time in the 26 years since their World Series appearance, the Brewers advanced to postseason play by winning the National League wild card. They were eliminated in the National League Division Series by the eventual World Series champion Philadelphia Phillies.

On September 23, 2011, the Milwaukee Brewers clinched their first division title in 29 years. They won the National League Division Series in five games over the Arizona Diamondbacks, but lost the National League Championship Series to the eventual World Series champion St. Louis Cardinals in six games.

In 2018, the Brewers clinched a spot in the post-season for the first time since 2011 with a 2–1 victory over the St. Louis Cardinals on September 26, 2018.

On September 29, they tied with the Cubs for first place in the National League Central, with a record of 95–67; at the end of the day on September 30, the Cubs and Brewers were still tied. This tie was broken on October 1, when the Brewers defeated the Cubs 3–1 in the NL Central tiebreaker to improve to 96–67 and win the division by one game. They went on to defeat the Colorado Rockies 3–0 to win the NLDS, but in the following NLCS, they lost out to the Los Angeles Dodgers in seven games.

In 2019, the Brewers returned to the postseason, where they were defeated in the National League Wild Card Game, 4–3, by the eventual World Series champion Washington Nationals.

In 2020, the club made the postseason for a third consecutive year, making the expanded Playoffs as the 8th seed losing both games to the eventual champion Dodgers.

In 2021, Giannis Antetokounmpo became a minority owner of the Brewers.

In 2021, the Brewers clinched the NL Central title with a 95–67 record. However, they lost to the eventual World Series champions Atlanta Braves in four games in the NLDS.

In 2023, the Brewers won the NL Central with a 92–70 record, but were swept in the best-of-three Wild Card series by the eventual NL Champion Arizona Diamondbacks.

In 2024, the team won the NL Central again, with a 93–69 record, but lost the winner-take-all game three of the Wild Card series in Milwaukee to the New York Mets.

In 2025, the Brewers finished with a 97–65 record, the best in their history, and the best record in MLB that season. This secured them their third-straight NL Central title as well as a bye to the best-of-five NLDS. They played the division rival Chicago Cubs in the NLDS, taking the series to a pivotal game five, which Milwaukee won 3–1, advancing to the NLCS. They were swept in the best-of-seven series by the eventual World Series champion Los Angeles Dodgers. During the 2025 NLCS, the Brewers offense tallied only 14 hits (or a team batting average of .118) through all four games of the series sweep by the Dodgers. This set a new record for the worst offensive performance by any team in a seven-game postseason series in MLB history.

In 2026, the Brewers won their fourth-straight NL Central championship, with the best record in baseball. They secured a bye to the NLDS for a second consecutive season, while achieving the first 100-win regular season in franchise history, finishing with a 103–59 record. In the NLDS, they faced the San Diego Padres, defeating them in four games to advance to the NLCS for the second year in a row. In the NLCS, they swept the Los Angeles Dodgers to win the NL pennant for the first time in their history, and defeated the Tampa Bay Rays 4–1 in the World Series to win their first championship in franchise history.

== Uniforms ==
=== 1970–1977 ===
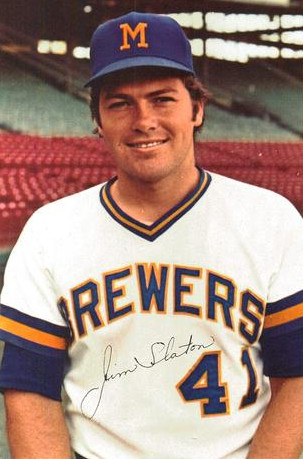
Jim Slaton in the original uniforms of the 1970s

The first Brewers uniforms were "hand-me-downs" from the Seattle Pilots. Because the move to Milwaukee received final approval less than a week before the start of the season, there was no time to order new uniforms. Selig had originally planned to change the Brewers' colors to navy blue and red in honor of the minor league American Association's Milwaukee Brewers (and are the colors of the Braves), but was forced to simply remove the Seattle markings from the Pilots' blue-and-gold uniforms and sew "BREWERS" on the front. However, the outline of the Pilots' logo remained visible. The uniforms had unique striping on the sleeves left over from the Pilots days. The cap was an updated version of the Milwaukee Braves cap: solid blue, with a yellow block "M" on the front. Ultimately, it was decided to keep blue and gold as the team colors, and they have remained so ever since (even though the team darkened the shades of both colors in 1994).

The Brewers finally got their own flannel design in 1971, but only for their home jerseys. This design was essentially the same as the one used in 1970, but with blue and yellow piping on the sleeves and collar. Meanwhile, the road jerseys did not add the trim around the collar and kept the wide-banded striping on the sleeves from the Pilots era. Additionally, player numbers were added to the front of both jerseys for 1971.

In 1972, the Brewers entered the double-knit era with uniforms based upon their flannels: all white with "BREWERS" on the front and blue and yellow trim on the sleeves, neck, waistband and down the side of the pants; the uniform took on the form of a pullover jersey and an elastic waistband. The road uniforms remained blue, although a darker shade than those of 1970 and '71. In 1974, a yellow-paneled cap was added to the road uniforms, and the "sanitation sock" on the road uniforms were also changed from white to yellow. This is the uniform that Hank Aaron wore with the club in his final seasons and that Robin Yount wore in his first. During this period, the logo of the club was the Beer Barrel Man, which had been used by the previous minor league Brewers since at least the 1940s. The Brewers mascot, Bernie Brewer (a man with a large yellow mustache wearing a Brewers hat) was introduced in 1973.

=== 1978–1993 (ball-in-glove logo) ===
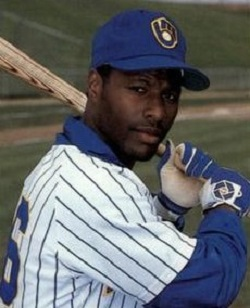
Milwaukee's home uniform design in the 1980s as worn by Mike Felder

The Brewers unveiled new uniforms for the 1978 season. The uniforms continued to use the pullover jersey/beltless pants combo, and featured pinstripes with a solid-blue collar and waistband. The road uniforms continued to be powder blue, but for the first time the city name, "Milwaukee", graced the chest in an upward slant in script form (It was the first time "Milwaukee" appeared on any MLB jersey; the Braves never displayed the city name on their road jerseys during their 13 seasons in the city).

In addition, the Brewers introduced the ball-in-glove logo that contained an "M" and "B" in the shape of a baseball glove. The logo was designed by Tom Meindel, an art history student at the University of Wisconsin-Eau Claire. The home cap was solid blue, and the road cap was blue with a yellow front panel. Additionally, their batting helmets had a white front panel. The club wore these uniforms in their pennant-winning season of 1982. Only minor changes were made until 1990; the color of the road uniforms changed to gray in 1985 while the blue-yellow-blue road cap and white-paneled batting helmets were abandoned at the same time.

In 1990, the Brewers made significant modifications to their uniforms, switching from pullover to button-down jerseys (the last American League team to do so; four National League teams still wore pullovers in 1990). Their individual uniforms showed other changes as well; at home, the blue piping was removed and the block lettered "BREWERS" was changed to a script version with a tail similar to the script used on road uniforms, while those outfits had their piping changed from blue-yellow-blue to blue-yellow. The road jerseys were the first uniforms in franchise history to feature player names on the back, introduced in the first year of this uniform set; names were added to the home jerseys beginning in 1993, the last year of this set.

=== 1994–1999 ===
In 1994, to commemorate the Brewers' 25th year in Milwaukee, the team completely redesigned their uniforms. The ball-in-glove logo was removed and replaced with a stylized interlocking "M" and "B" set on a pair of crossed bats and a diamond background. The royal blue changed to navy blue, while the yellow changed to a metallic gold. Forest green was added as a third color. The jerseys swapped pinstripes for retro-themed piping around the collar, buttons, and sleeves, following a trend that was popular in the 1990s. The uniforms' lettering had the same style of letters as the new cap logo with heavily stylized "BREWERS" lettering on the home jerseys and "MILWAUKEE" on the road grays. For the first time, an alternative jersey was introduced. It was navy blue with the home "BREWERS" lettering on the front and featured the Brewers' logo on the lower left side. On all three jerseys, the first and last letters were larger than the rest. The caps featured the interlocking "MB" logo (without the bats or diamond) on both the home and away versions. The home cap was completely navy blue, while the away cap featured a navy blue crown and a forest green bill. Due to its similarity to the Notre Dame Fighting Irish colors and uniforms, the Brewers' uniforms from this era was nicknamed "Motre Bame" as a pun to both teams' designs.

In 1997, the uniforms were slightly modified, with the main logo being removed from the caps and replaced with an "M". All navy caps were worn with both the home and away uniforms; the home hats featured a white "M" and the road caps had a gold "M." The green socks that had previously been worn on the road were changed to navy blue. The blue alternate jersey placed the player's number on the lower left side instead of the logo, and numbers were also added to the lower left side of the white and gray jerseys. Also, all letters were made the same size.

=== 2000–2019 ===
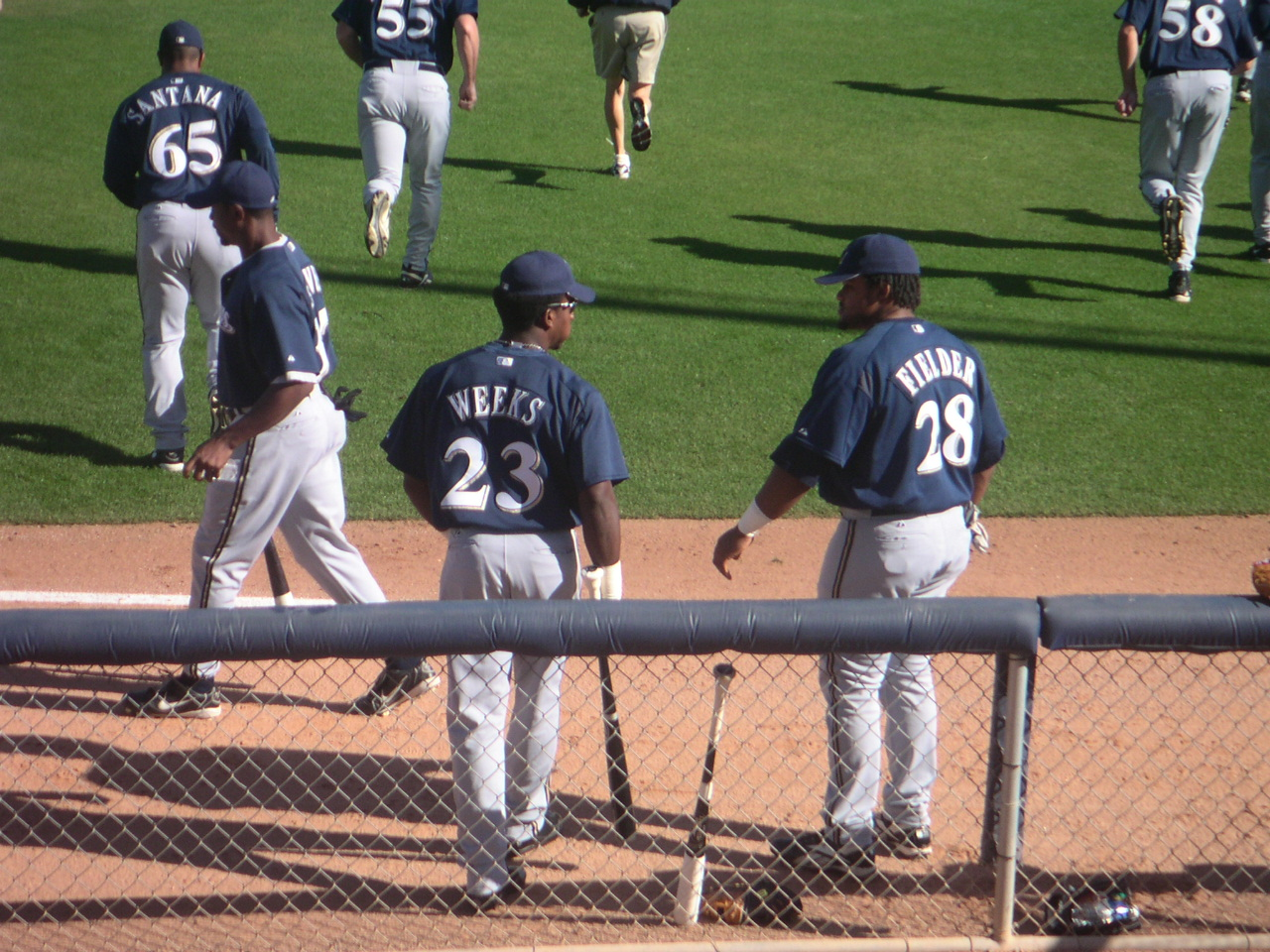
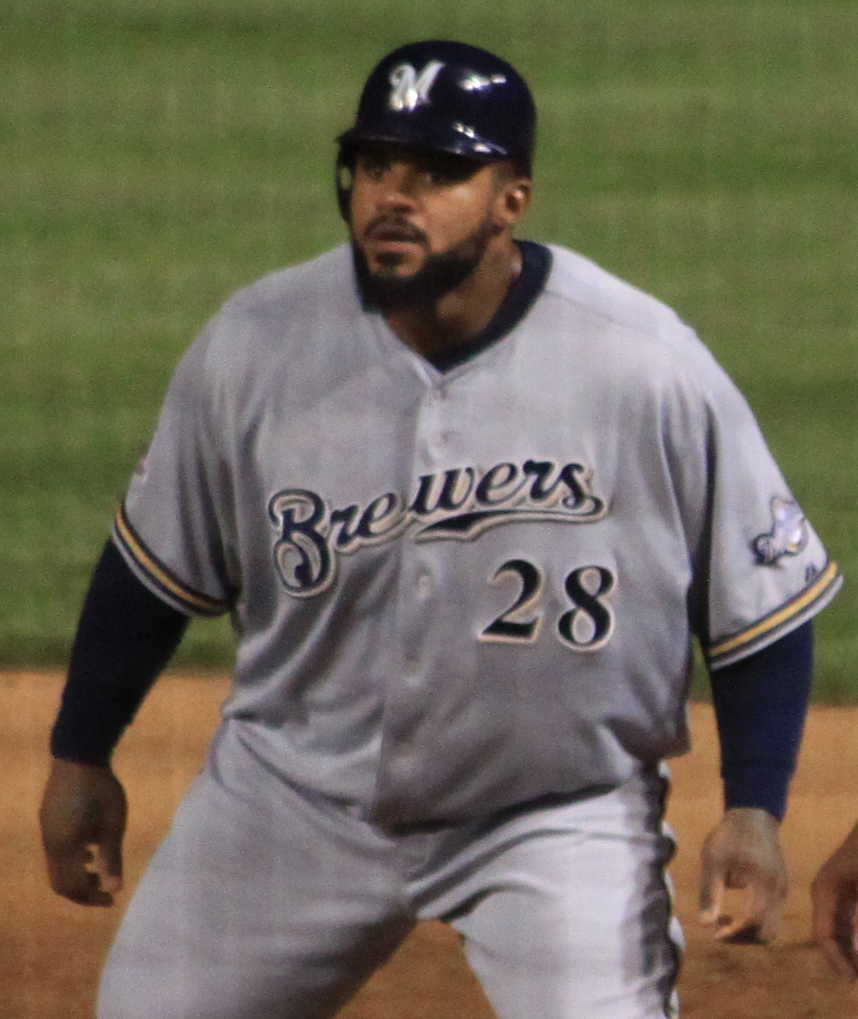
From 2000 to 2019, the Brewers wore jerseys with navy and gold outlining, as modeled by Prince Fielder

Before the 2000 season, to coincide with the anticipated opening of Miller Park, the Brewers changed their uniforms again. The block letters on the front were replaced with "Brewers" in a flowing script, and green was removed as the third color. The cap logo was a script "M", similar in style to the Miller logo, with a head of barley underlining it, symbolizing Milwaukee's beer-making industry. The home uniforms also featured a patch on the left sleeve consisting of the cap logo with a gold outline of the state of Wisconsin behind it, showing the Brewers statewide appeal. The road uniforms were grey and featured the same script "Brewers" on the front, with a simple patch on the left sleeve bearing a script "Milwaukee". There was also an alternate navy blue jersey that had the same features as the home jersey.

The debut of the new uniforms was supposed to coincide with the opening of Miller Park, but a crane collapse in July 1999 which killed three workers and damaged the incomplete stadium delayed its opening until 2001.

In 2006, the Brewers introduced Retro Sundays, when the Brewers would wear uniforms featuring the "ball-in-glove" logo. The uniforms are similar to the uniforms worn from 1978 to 1989, but with some modern modifications, such as the uniforms having a button-down front instead of being a pullover jersey, displaying players' last names on the backs of the jerseys, and a "ball-in-glove" logo patch on the left sleeve. In 2007, the Retro day was changed from Sunday to Friday, though they may also be worn outside of those days if a starting pitcher chooses the retro uniforms to wear during his start. In 2010, the Brewers debuted a new alternate road jersey which, like the other alternate jersey, is navy blue, but bears a script "Milwaukee" on the front. In 2013, a gold alternate jersey with "Brewers" on the front was introduced, as well.

During the off-season before the 2013 season, the Brewers allowed fans to design their own Milwaukee Brewers uniforms. Three finalists were chosen, which fans were given the opportunity to vote for their favorite through the Brewers website. The winning uniform was designed by Ben Peters of Richfield, Minnesota, and was worn by the Brewers for two spring training games.

In 2016, the Brewers replaced their road navy and home gold alternates with a new navy alternate jersey. The uniform is similar to the previous road navy alternate but with yellow replacing gold as the trim color, and is paired with a navy cap featuring the "ball-and-glove" logo. From 2017 to 2019, both alternate navy uniforms were used for both home and away games, and each were worn more often than the traditional white and gray tops.

=== 2020–present ===
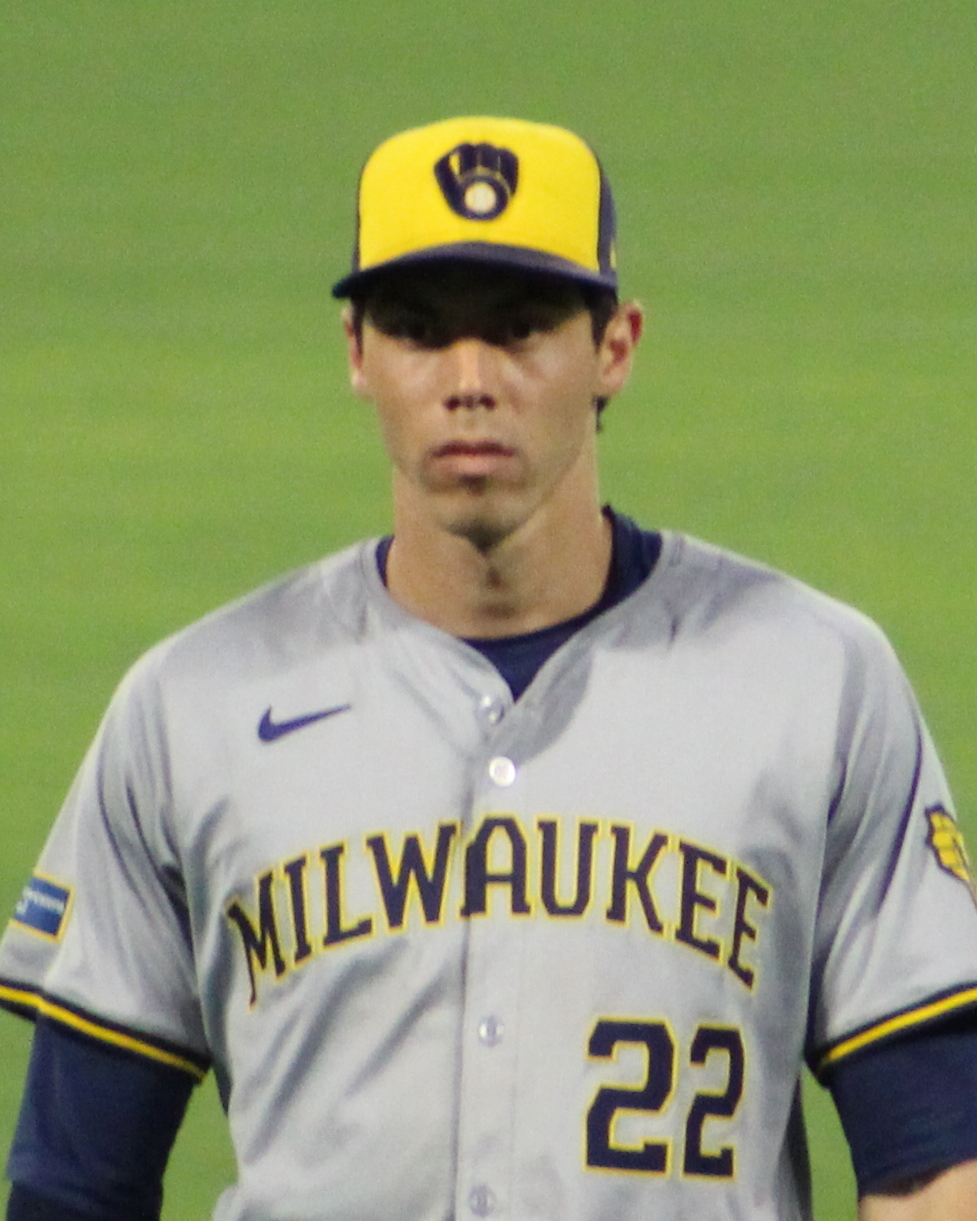
In 2020, the Brewers changed the shade of gold for the outline of their jerseys with a modernized version of the "ball-in-glove" logo; from 2020 to 2025, the team wore a road uniform (as modelled by Christian Yelich) with gray before changing it to powder blue.

On November 18, 2019, the Brewers published "Glove Story", a series of videos and written work showcasing the new branding of the team, with a uniform unveiling event at Miller Park occurring the same evening. The look throws back to past iterations of designs used for the team, with a modernized version of the classic "ball-in-glove" logo being the centerpiece of the new identity. The navy blue from the previous logo and uniform set was retained, but the metallic gold was replaced with mustard gold, and royal blue was returned to the team's color scheme for the first time since 1993.

The set included a cream home uniform with "Brewers" and numbers in stylized block letters (a nod to Milwaukee's "Cream City" nickname), a home alternate pinstriped white uniform which shares the same features as the cream uniforms, a grey road uniform with "Milwaukee" and numbers in stylized block letters, and a road alternate navy uniform with "Milwaukee" in script letters and numbers in stylized block letters. The home sleeve patch features a navy baseball with stylized barley seams, while the road sleeve patch features the gold Wisconsin map with Cream City bricks and a baseball to represent Milwaukee's location. Initially, the gold-paneled navy cap was only used with the navy alternate uniform whereas the other uniforms were paired with the all-navy cap. However, beginning in 2022, the alternate gold-paneled cap was used exclusively on the road, with the all-navy cap worn only on home games. Both designs have the modernized "ball-in-glove" logo in front.

In 2022, the Brewers added a "City Connect" uniform in conjunction with Nike. The uniform is powder blue with white pants and features the "Brew Crew" nickname in stylized gold letters and navy trim. A stylized baseball shaped like an enclosed grill is emblazoned on the right sleeve. Caps are powder blue with navy brim and features both the "MKE" abbreviation in gold and the city's "414" area code in navy.

In 2023, the Brewers added a uniform sponsor in Northwestern Mutual, with the company's logo patch recolored to the Brewers' navy and white. The patch was prominently featured on either sleeve depending on a player's handedness; the other sleeve accommodated the team's "baseball and barley" logo on the home uniforms, and the "Wisconsin brick" logo on the road uniform.

For the 2025 season, the Brewers' uniforms had a commemorative patch on the right sleeve, honoring former Brewers radio broadcaster Bob Uecker, who died on January 16, 2025. The patch was circular, with the outer part featuring a plaid pattern, referring to the distinctive plaid sport coats Uecker wore in television commercials in the 1980s and 1990s, an inner circle with a baseball design, and Uecker's signature running through the center of the patch.

Ahead of the 2026 season, the Brewers tweaked their primary road uniform. This design essentially swapped the grey base on the uniform top in favor of powder blue, while keeping the grey pants. It served as a nod to the powder blue uniforms the team wore from 1970 to 1985. They also released a second City Connect uniform, featuring a blue base, cream and sunset accents with "Wisco" on the chest as a nod to Wisconsin. White shoulder stripes featuring a stylized barley grain are also added, as is a new "Fielding Barrelman" sleeve patch within the Wisconsin outline. Caps are blue with a stylized "W" in front of the state outline.

== Achievements ==
=== Awards ===
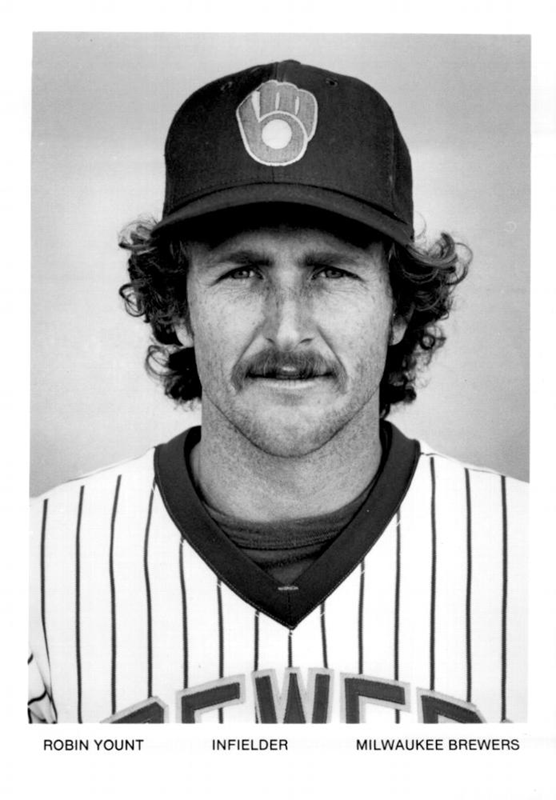
Robin Yount won the American League MVP Award in 1982 and 1989.

Four Brewers have won the MLB Most Valuable Player Award during their careers with the team: Rollie Fingers (1981), Robin Yount (1982 and 1989), Ryan Braun (2011), and Christian Yelich (2018). Four pitchers have won the Cy Young Award: Rollie Fingers (1981), Pete Vuckovich (1982), Corbin Burnes (2021), and Jacob Misiorowski (2026). Three players have been named Rookie of the Year: Pat Listach (1992), Ryan Braun (2007), and Devin Williams (2020). Pat Murphy (2024–2026) is the only Brewers manager to have won the Manager of the Year Award, winning it three times. William Contreras became the first and only Brewer to win the World Series Most Valuable Player Award in 2026, following the Brewers' first World Series title.

Two Brewers have won the Hank Aaron Award: Prince Fielder (2007) and Christian Yelich (2018 and 2019). Dave Parker (1990) is the only Brewer to have won the Edgar Martínez Award. Four players have been recognized with top relief pitcher honors. Rollie Fingers (1981) and John Axford (2011) won the Rolaids Relief Man Award, and Josh Hader (2018, 2019, and 2021) and Devin Williams (2020 and 2023) won the Trevor Hoffman NL Reliever of the Year Award. Cecil Cooper (1983) is the only Brewer to win the Roberto Clemente Award. Nine Brewers have won the Rawlings Gold Glove Award, two have won the Wilson Defensive Player of the Year Award, and 11 have won the Silver Slugger Award. Seventy-three Brewers have been selected to play in the Major League Baseball All-Star Game, and eight have been named to All-MLB Teams.

In the postseason, one Brewer has won the League Championship Series Most Valuable Player Award with Jake Bauers, while William Contreras is the only Brewer to have won the World Series Most Valuable Player Award.

=== Hall of Famers ===
Ten Brewers have been inducted into the Baseball Hall of Fame after spending some or all of their careers with the team. None of them were affiliated with the franchise when it was the Seattle Pilots. Robin Yount is the only member to have played his entire career with Milwaukee.

Milwaukee Brewers Hall of Famers
Affiliation according to the National Baseball Hall of Fame and Museum
Milwaukee Brewers

Hank Aaron
Rollie Fingers

Trevor Hoffman
**Paul Molitor** *

Dave Parker
CC Sabathia

Bud Selig
Ted Simmons

Don Sutton
**Robin Yount** *

- Players and managers listed in **bold** are depicted on their Hall of Fame plaques wearing a Brewers cap insignia.
- * Milwaukee Brewers listed as primary team according to the Hall of Fame

=== Ford C. Frick Award recipients ===
Two Brewers broadcasters have won the Ford C. Frick Award.

Milwaukee Brewers Ford C. Frick Award recipients
Affiliation according to the National Baseball Hall of Fame and Museum

Joe Castiglione

**Bob Uecker**

- **Names in bold** received the award based primarily on their work as broadcasters for the Brewers.

=== Retired numbers ===
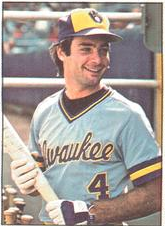
The number 4 was retired in honor of Hall of Famer Paul Molitor (1978–1992)

The Brewers have retired five uniform numbers and a microphone in honor of former players and team personnel. This ensures that the number will be associated with one person of particular importance to the team. Additionally, the number 42 has been retired throughout professional baseball in honor of Jackie Robinson. Two numbers have also been unofficially retired by the Brewers, Number 17 has not been issued since Jim Gantner's retirement in 1992. Gantner, however, later wore the number from 1996 to 1997 when he returned as the Brewers' first base coach. Number 8 has also not been issued since the retirement of Ryan Braun in 2021.

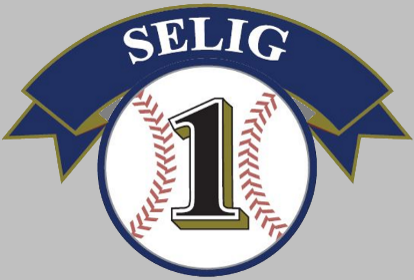
Bud
Selig
Owner

Retired April 6, 2015
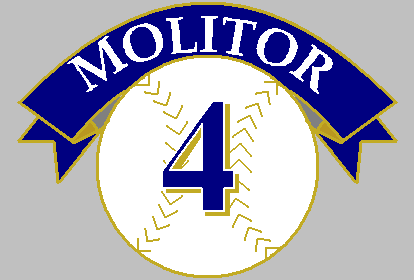
Paul
Molitor
3B

Retired June 11, 1999
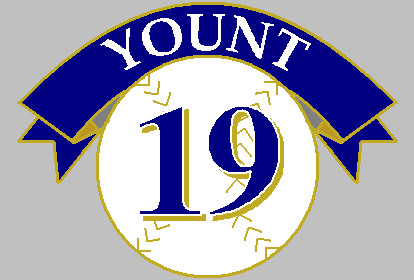
Robin
Yount
SS
Coach
Retired May 29, 1994
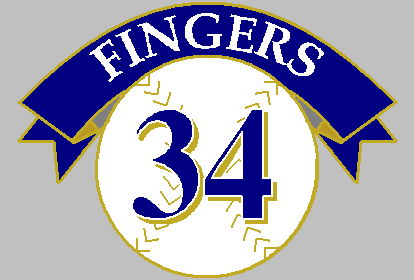
Rollie
Fingers
P

Retired August 9, 1992
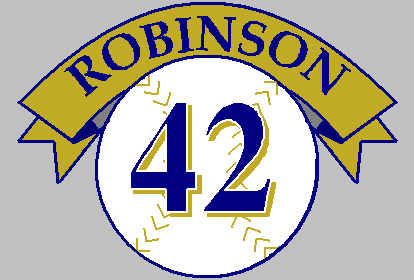
Jackie
Robinson
2B

Retired April 15, 1997
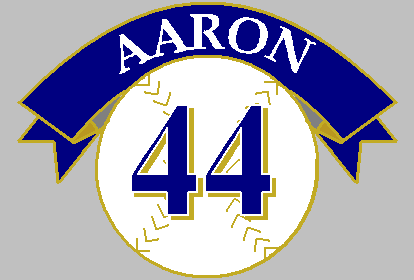
Hank
Aaron
DH

Retired October 3, 1976
Bob
Uecker
Broadcaster

Retired August 24, 2025

=== Wisconsin Athletic Hall of Fame ===
Nine individuals associated with the Brewers have been inducted in the Wisconsin Athletic Hall of Fame.

Milwaukee Brewers in the Wisconsin Athletic Hall of Fame
Name	Inducted	Position(s)	Years	Ref.
Hank Aaron	1988	Designated hitter	1975–1976	
Cecil Cooper	2007	First baseman	1977–1987	
Jim Gantner	2005	Second baseman / coach	1976–1992 / 1996–1997	
Harvey Kuenn	1988	Manager / coach	1972–1975 / 1975, 1982–1983	
Paul Molitor	1999	Third baseman	1978–1992	
Bud Selig	2001	Owner	1970–1998	
Gorman Thomas	2003	Center fielder	1973–1976, 1978–1983, 1986	
Bob Uecker	1998	Broadcaster	1971–2024	
Robin Yount	1995	Shortstop	1974–1993	

=== Team captains ===
- Christian Yelich (2026–present)

== Season-by-season results ==
Milwaukee Brewers results (last 10 seasons)
MLB season	Team season	League	Division	Regular-season					Postseason				Ref.
MLB season	Team season	League	Division	Finish	Wins	Losses	Win %	GB	Wins	Losses	Win %	Result	Ref.
2017	2017	NL	Central	2nd	86	76	.531	6	—	—	—	—	
2018	2018	NL	Central	1st	96	67	.589	—	6	4	.600	Won NL Central Division title Won NLDS vs. Colorado Rockies, 3–0; Lost NLCS vs. Los Angeles Dodgers, 4–3	
2019	2019	NL	Central	2nd	89	73	.549	2	0	1	.000	Won NL wild card berth Lost NLWCG vs. Washington Nationals, 1–0	
2020	2020	NL	Central	4th	29	31	.483	5	0	2	.000	Won NL wild card berth Lost NLWCS vs. Los Angeles Dodgers, 2–0	
2021	2021	NL	Central	1st	95	67	.586	—	1	3	.250	Won NL Central Division title Lost NLDS vs. Atlanta Braves, 3–1	
2022	2022	NL	Central	2nd	86	76	.531	7	—	—	—	—	
2023	2023	NL	Central	1st	92	70	.568	—	0	2	.000	Won NL Central Division title Lost NLWCS vs. Arizona Diamondbacks, 2–0	
2024	2024	NL	Central	1st	93	69	.574	—	1	2	.333	Won NL Central Division title Lost NLWCS vs. New York Mets, 2–1	
2025	2025	NL	Central	1st	97	65	.599	—	3	6	.333	Won NL Central Division title Won NLDS vs. Chicago Cubs, 3–2; Lost NLCS vs. Los Angeles Dodgers, 4–0	
2026	2026	NL	Central	1st	103	59	.636	—	11	2	.846	Won NL Central Division title Won NLDS vs. San Diego Padres, 3–1 Won NLCS vs. Los Angeles Dodgers, 4–0 Won World Series vs. Tampa Bay Rays, 4–1	
Totals	—	—	—	—	866	653	.570	—	22	22	.500	—	—

== Franchise leaders ==
These are records of players with the best performance in distinct statistical categories during their career with the Brewers.

=== Batting ===
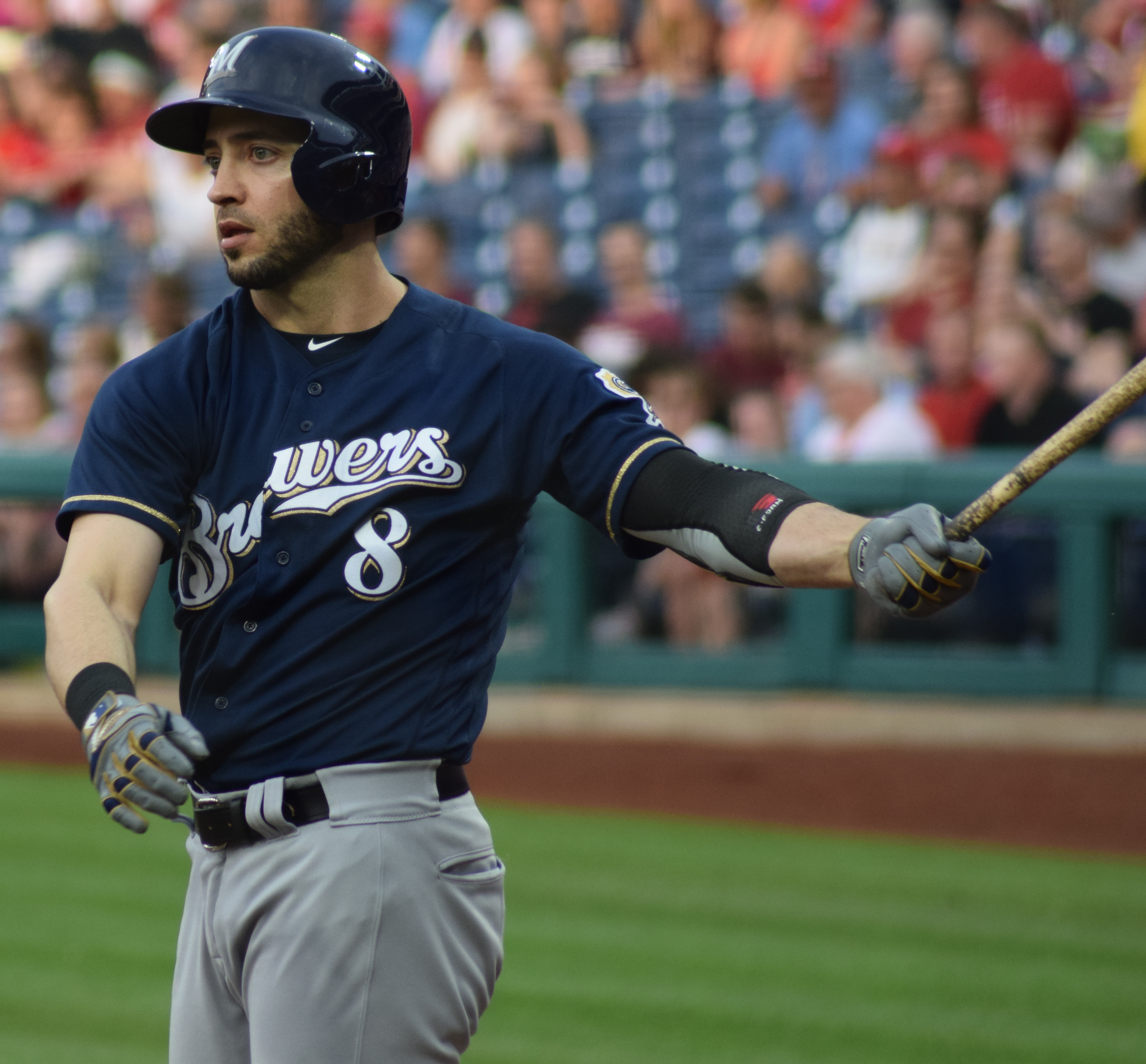
Ryan Braun is the career leader in home runs (352).

Statistic	Player	Record	Brewers career	Ref.
Games played	Robin Yount	2,856	1974–1993	
Runs	Robin Yount	1,632	1974–1993	
Hits	Robin Yount	3,142	1974–1993	
Doubles	Robin Yount	583	1974–1993	
Triples	Robin Yount	126	1974–1993	
Home runs	Ryan Braun	352	2007–2020	
Runs batted in	Robin Yount	1,406	1974–1993	
Stolen bases	Paul Molitor	412	1978–1992	
Walks	Robin Yount	966	1974–1993	
Batting average	Jeff Cirillo	.307	1994–1999, 2005–2006	

=== Pitching ===
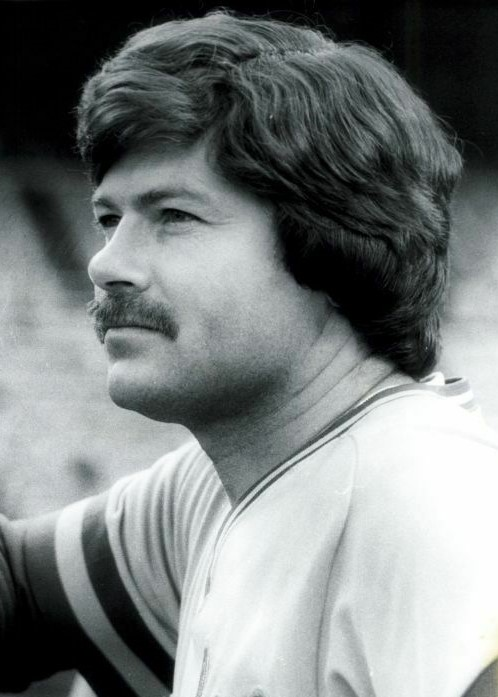
Jim Slaton is the career leader in wins (117), starts (268), shutouts (19), and innings pitched (2,025 1/3).

Statistic	Player	Record	Brewers career	Ref.
Wins	Jim Slaton	117	1971–1977, 1979–1983	
Winning percentage	Brent Suter	.655	2016–2022	
Earned run average	Brandon Woodruff	3.10	2017–2023, 2025–present	
Games pitched	Dan Plesac	365	1986–1992	
Games started	Jim Slaton	268	1971–1977, 1979–1983	
Saves	Dan Plesac	133	1986–1992	
Innings pitched	Jim Slaton	2,025 1/3	1971–1977, 1979–1983	
Strikeouts	Yovani Gallardo	1,226	2007–2014	

== Roster ==
Milwaukee Brewers 2027 spring training roster
40-man roster		Non-roster invitees	Coaches / other
Pitchers: 56 Grant Anderson; 26 Aaron Ashby; 57 Coleman Crow; 55 Shane Drohan; 54 Robert Gasser; 36 Colton Gordon; 37 DL Hall; 52 Kyle Harrison; 43 Logan Henderson; 29 Trevor Megill; 32 Jacob Misiorowski; 39 Chad Patrick; 23 Brandon Sproat; 31 Garrett Stallings; 45 Abner Uribe	Catchers: 24 William Contreras; 14 Bo Naylor; 15 Jeferson Quero; Infielders: 6 David Hamilton; 3 Joey Ortiz; 12 Cooper Pratt; 2 Brice Turang; 28 Andrew Vaughn; Outfielders: 11 Jackson Chourio; 10 Sal Frelick; 18 Luis Lara; 20 Brandon Lockridge; 5 Garrett Mitchell; Designated hitters: 7 Tyler Black; 22 Christian Yelich		Manager: 00 Pat Murphy; Coaches: 67 Spencer Allen (first base); 97 Christian Correa (bullpen catcher); 98 Néstor Corredor (field coordinator); 95 Daniel de Mondesert (game preparation specialist); 94 Ty Duvall (bullpen catcher); 68 Matt Erickson (third base); 88 Charlie Greene (bullpen); 71 Jim Henderson (pitching coordinator); 84 Chris Hook (pitching); 40 Jason Lane (offense and strategy coordinator); 96 Evan Martin (game preparation specialist); 91 Guillermo Martínez (hitting); 93 Juan Sandoval (assistant pitching); 85 Eric Theisen (lead hitting); 92 Daniel Vogelbach (hitting); 60-day injured list: 35 Brian Fitzpatrick; 46 Quinn Priester; 61 Ángel Zerpa; 30 active, 0 inactive, 0 non-roster invitees; 7-, 10-, or 15-day injured list; * Not on active roster; ^{†} Suspended list; Roster, coaches, and NRIs updated November 2, 2026; Transactions • Depth chart; → All MLB rosters

== Managers ==
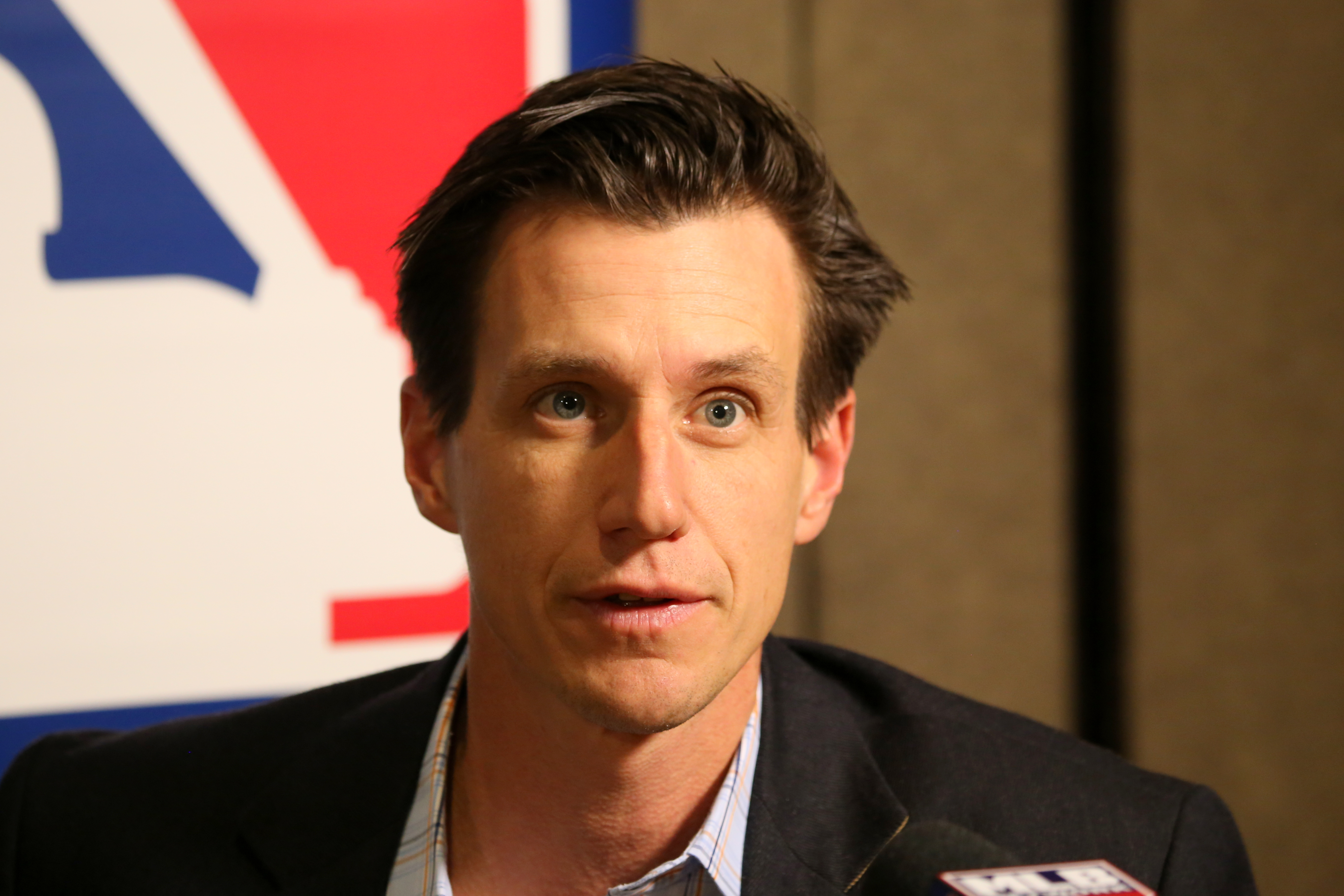
Craig Counsell, manager from 2015 to 2023

Through 57 seasons of play, the Brewers franchise has employed 20 managers. The records of the last five managers are shown below.

Milwaukee Brewers managerial record (last five managers)
No.	Manager	Season(s)	G	W	L	Win %	PA	PW	PL	LC	WS	Ref.
16	Dale Sveum	2008	12	7	5	.583	1	1	3	0	0	
17	Ken Macha	2009–2010	324	157	167	.485	—	—	—	—	—	
18	Ron Roenicke	2011–2015	673	342	331	.508	1	5	6	0	0	
19	Craig Counsell	2015–2023	1,332	707	625	.531	5	7	12	0	0	
20	Pat Murphy	2024–present	486	293	193	.603	3	15	10	1	1	
Totals	5 managers	19 seasons	2,665	1,696	1,455	.526	10	28	31	1	1	—

== Minor league affiliations ==
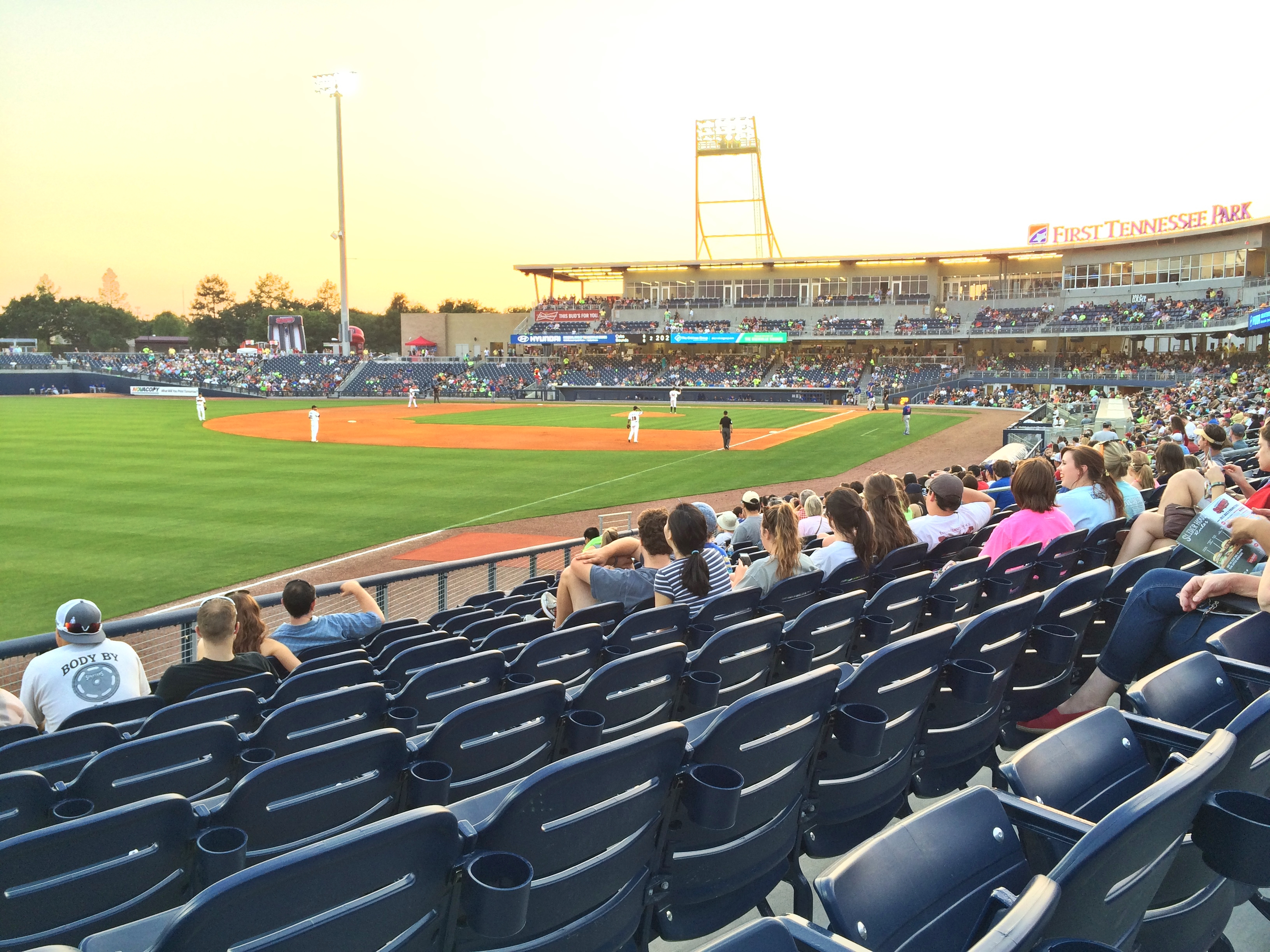
First Horizon Park in Nashville, Tennessee, home of the Nashville Sounds, the Brewers' Triple-A affiliate

The Milwaukee Brewers farm system consists of seven minor league affiliates.

Class	Team	League	Location	Ballpark	Affiliated
Triple-A	Nashville Sounds	International League	Nashville, Tennessee	First Horizon Park	2021
Double-A	Biloxi Shuckers	Southern League	Biloxi, Mississippi	Keesler Federal Park	2015
High-A	Wisconsin Timber Rattlers	Midwest League	Grand Chute, Wisconsin	Neuroscience Group Field at Fox Cities Stadium	2009
Single-A	Wilson Warbirds	Carolina League	Wilson, North Carolina	Wilson Ballpark	2026
Rookie	ACL Brewers	Arizona Complex League	Phoenix, Arizona	American Family Fields of Phoenix	2001
Rookie	DSL Brewers Blue	Dominican Summer League	Santo Domingo Este, Santo Domingo	Dominican Republic Academy	2010
Rookie	DSL Brewers Gold	Dominican Summer League	Santo Domingo Este, Santo Domingo	Dominican Republic Academy	2021

== Radio and television ==
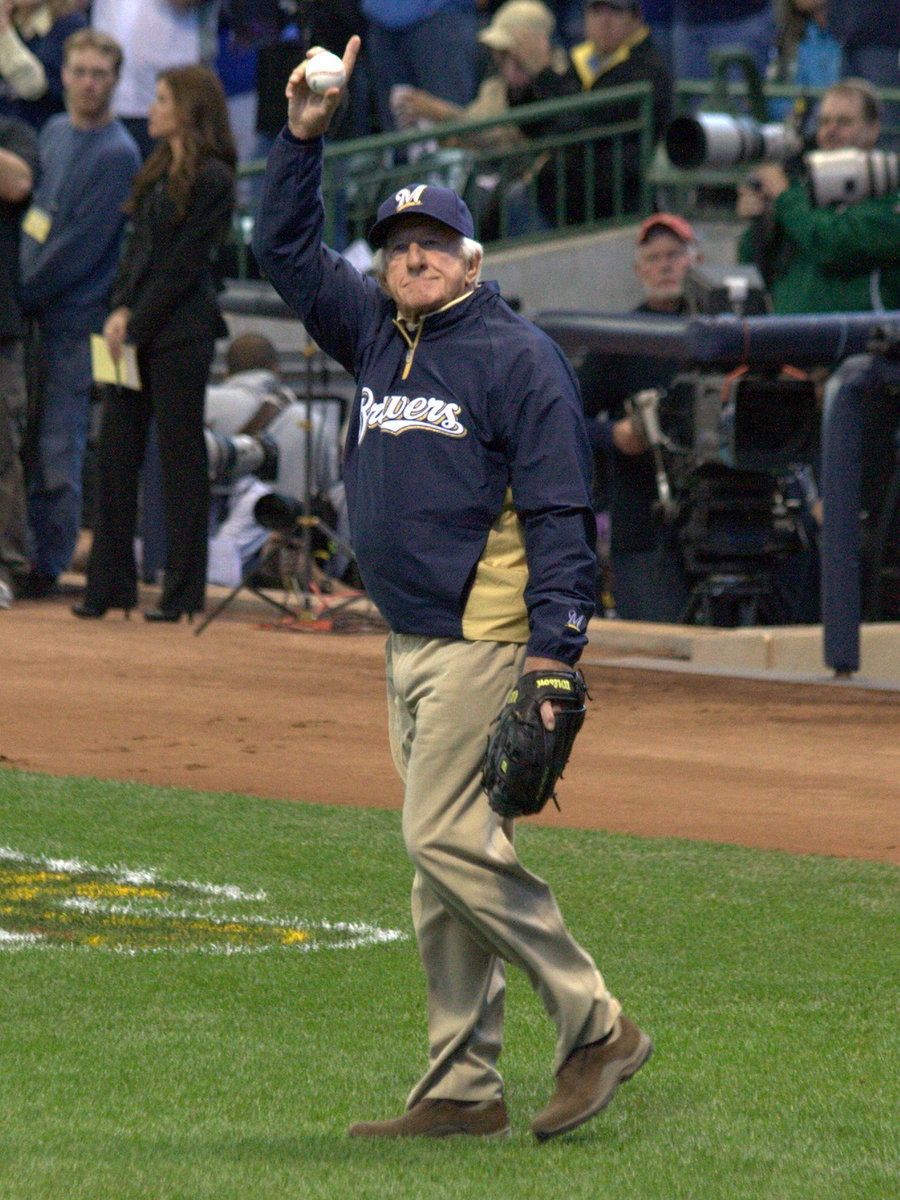
Bob Uecker served as the play-by-play announcer for Milwaukee Brewers radio broadcasts for 54 seasons

Map of radio affiliates in 2017; note the map consists of data for stations by location of transmitter, thus WTMJ's location being in Racine County near Union Grove rather than Milwaukee.

The Brewers' flagship radio station is WTMJ (620 AM/103.3 FM). Bob Uecker, who joined the Brewers in 1970, served as the team's play-by-play broadcaster for 54 seasons, from 1971 until his death after the 2024 season and eventually received the Ford C. Frick Award from the Baseball Hall of Fame. Jeff Levering and Lane Grindle served alongside Uecker. Levering joined the team's radio broadcast in 2015 as a fill-in for Uecker on some road games Grindle joined the team in 2016, replacing Joe Block, who had left to join the Pittsburgh Pirates after the 2015 season. Block replaced Cory Provus who had left to become the Minnesota Twins lead broadcaster on radio after the 2011 season. Provus, formerly of WGN radio in Chicago, replaced Jim Powell, who left Milwaukee for the Atlanta Braves radio network. Powell in turn replaced Pat Hughes, who departed to do play-by-play for the Cubs on WGN in 1996. The Brewers radio broadcasts usually featured a 2–2–2–1–2 format where Uecker did solo play-by-play for the first, middle and last 2 innings, while Levering did innings 3–4 and 7, and both doing analysis throughout and varied presentation for extra innings games. Starting with the 2014 season Uecker cut back on the number of road games he works due to health concerns, mainly involving West Coast trips and distant road games in Colorado and Atlanta; Block handled the play-by-play, with former Brewer and Met Darryl Hamilton on color for the first series at Atlanta.

Some daytime home games were broadcast in Spanish over Waukesha-licensed ESPN Deportes Radio affiliate WRRD (1510), with Jaime Cano serving as play-by-play announcer. In 2017 the station was purchased by another party which instituted an English-language talk format, effectively ending that arrangement.

Brian Anderson, who has worked on The Golf Channel, took over as the Brewers' play-by-play announcer for the 2007 season. He replaced Daron Sutton, who joined the Arizona Diamondbacks. The color commentator is Bill Schroeder, a former major league catcher who played six of his eight seasons for the Brewers. As of 2014 Schroeder is in his 20th season as the Brewers' color commentator. The 2010 season was the first year where all of Fox Sports Wisconsin's games were broadcast in high definition. Anderson (who also is a part of TBS playoff coverage) also provided play-by-play for the 2011 NLCS due to Ernie Johnson stepping aside for the year due to a medical situation with his son. Since 2014, as Anderson's TNT Sports duties have increased along with the addition of NCAA college basketball and NBA on TNT play-by-play duties, Wisconsin Badgers football and men's college basketball radio announcer Matt Lepay has served as play-by-play man on days when Anderson has other assignments for TNT Sports. In 2022, Levering became the primary play-by-play television announcer with Anderson now calling only 50 games per season due to increased duties with both MLB and the NBA national broadcasts. In October 2024, as a result of bankruptcy proceedings involving former broadcaster Diamond Sports Group, Major League Baseball's local media division announced that it would take over the production and distribution of Brewers games starting with the 2025 season, with no changes in personnel, as all on-air staff are employed by the Brewers themselves. However, on December 31, 2024, the Brewers announced that they would return to FanDuel Sports Network for the 2025 season. Starting with the 2026 season, the Brewers officially moved to MLB Local Media, along with most of the remaining teams handled by Diamond Sports Group.

From 2007 to 2011, the Brewers and FSN Wisconsin subcontracted to Weigel Broadcasting a package of 15 games and one spring training game over-the-air on WMLW-CA (then-Channel 41/58.2) in Milwaukee each season with FSN Wisconsin producing the telecasts and Weigel selling air time for each of those games and additional games added depending on weather postponements and pennant race standings (WMLW-CA games would air on the outstate FSN Wisconsin network for the remainder of the state). The deal was ended before the 2012 season in order to facilitate full-season HD coverage on FSN Wisconsin and distribution complications, along with the addition of a "Plus" channel for Milwaukee Bucks play-by-play conflict situations. Weigel continues to air a few Sunday home broadcasts per year with Spanish language play-by-play on Telemundo affiliate WYTU-LD (Channels 63/58.4), which produces their own broadcasts using FSN's camera positions with Hector Molina on play-by-play and bilingual WDJT sports anchor Kevin Holden on color.

Five of the six major network television stations in Milwaukee, along with WMLW-CA, have carried game broadcasts over the years, with WTMJ-TV being the original broadcaster in the 1970s. WVTV carried the team for the bulk of the 1980s and early 1990s, with WCGV-TV following from 1994 until 2004, and WISN-TV carrying select Sunday games at the beginning of the 2000s. Before 2025, WITI was the only station not to have carried local coverage of the team through its history (though former WITI sports anchor and current Bucks play-by-play man Jim Paschke was the team's TV announcer during its time with WVTV and portions of WCGV's coverage contract), although it has aired national games from CBS and Fox involving the Brewers through the years.

On March 19, 2025, the team announced that through a deal made with WTMJ owner Good Karma Brands and FanDuel Sports Network Wisconsin, WITI, along with a state network of stations within the team's territory, would carry three spring training and ten regular season games in the 2025 season locally in a simulcast with FanDuel Sports Network Wisconsin.

Achievements
Preceded by Los Angeles Dodgers; 2024–2025	World Series champions 2026	Succeeded by Incumbent
Preceded by New York Yankees; 1981	American League champions 1982	Succeeded by Baltimore Orioles; 1983
Preceded by Los Angeles Dodgers; 2024–2025	National League champions 2026	Succeeded by Incumbent
