= Rick Schlesinger =

American baseball executive

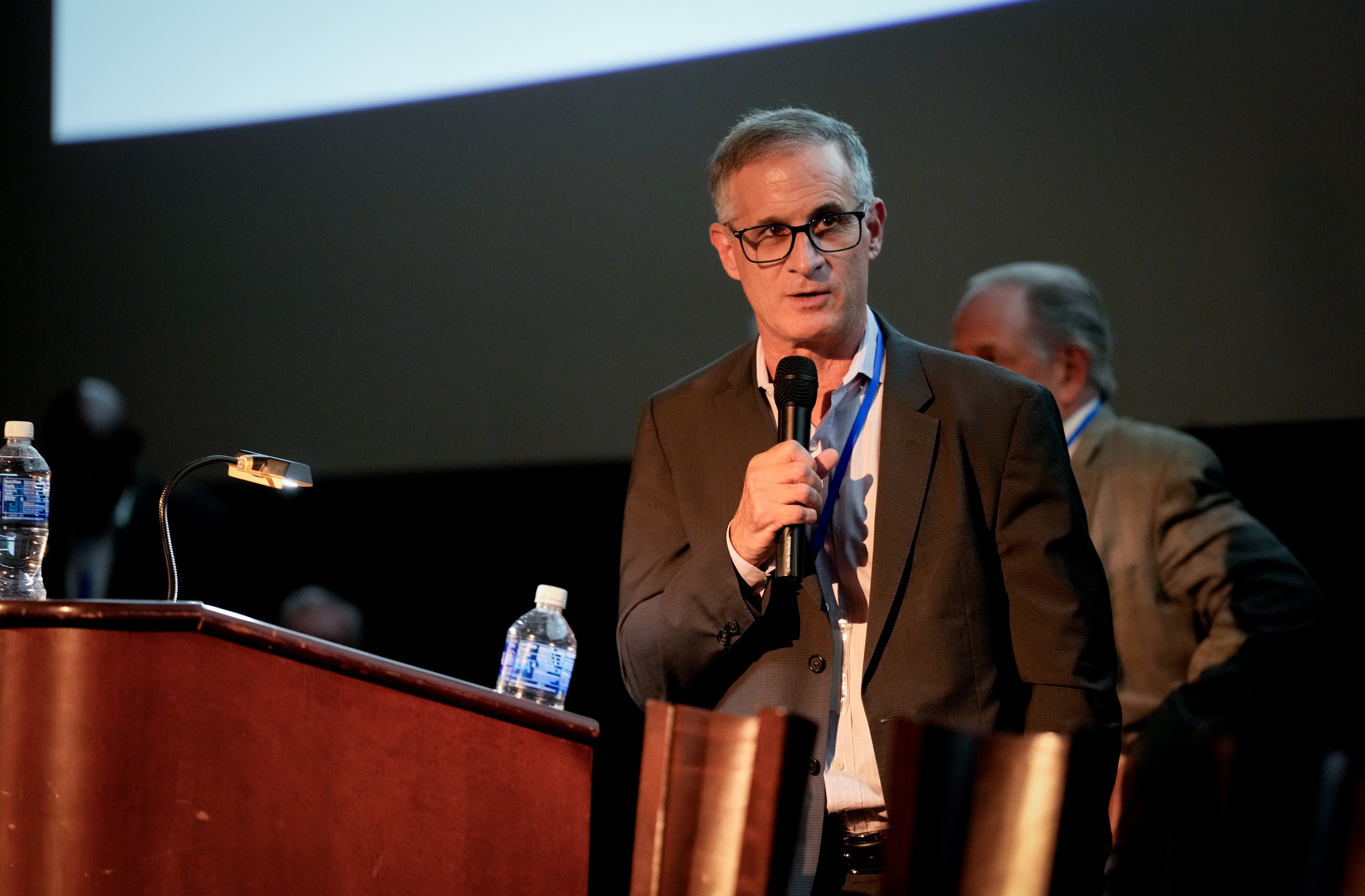
- Schlesinger in 2024
- Born: 1961 (age 64–65); Milwaukee, Wisconsin
- Education: University of Wisconsin-Madison Harvard Law School
- Occupation: American baseball executive
- Employer: Milwaukee Brewers

Rick Schlesinger is an American baseball executive who serves as the president of business operations for the Milwaukee Brewers of Major League Baseball (MLB). He joined the Brewers in 2002 and was promoted to his current role in 2019.

== Early life and education ==
Schlesinger was born in Bayside, Wisconsin, and attended Nicolet High School. He graduated from the University of Wisconsin-Madison with degrees in political science and history and later earned his Juris Doctor (cum laude) from Harvard Law School.

== Career ==
Schlesinger began his career at the Los Angeles law firm Latham & Watkins before moving into entertainment business and legal roles at Walt Disney Pictures and Television. From 1998 to 2002, he served as vice president of business and legal affairs and assistant general manager for the Anaheim Angels.

He joined the Milwaukee Brewers in 2002 and has held several senior leadership roles within the organization, overseeing business operations including finance, marketing, sponsorships, ticketing, analytics, communications, and stadium operations. He also oversees American Family Fields of Phoenix and the business operations of the Wilson Warbirds.

In 2025, Schlesinger was named the 2025 Executive of the Year by the Milwaukee Business Journal.

== Personal life ==
Schlesinger resides in Hartland, Wisconsin, with his wife, Kate. They have five children, Bradley, Sam, Caitlin, Molly, and Mathieu.
