= Milwaukee Brewers ball-in-glove logo =

Major League Baseball team logo

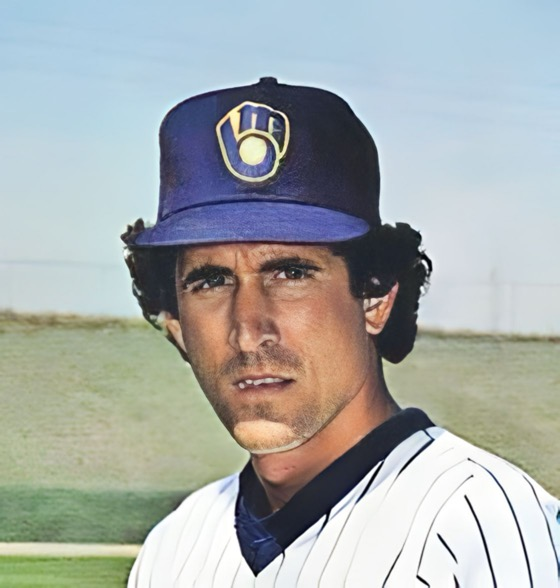
Jaime Cocanower with ball-in-glove logo on his hat (1984)

The Milwaukee Brewers ball-in-glove logo was created by Tom Meindel for the Milwaukee Brewers of Major League Baseball, which used the logo from 1978 to 1993. Other logos were adopted by the team between 1993 and 2019.

Beginning in 2017, the Brewers began planning to find a new logo. By 2020 they decided to use the ball-in-glove logo again. The Brewers released a "retro-inspired" uniform utilizing the logo to celebrate their 50th anniversary.

== History ==
In 1977, the Milwaukee Brewers of Major League Baseball sponsored a contest to replace the team's Barrelman logo. The team received 1,932 entries, from which they selected a logo designed by a 30-year-old college art student Tom Meindel. The colors of the contest submission from Meindel were brown and yellow. Meindel received US$2,000 (equivalent to $10,626 in 2025) for the design, but he did not receive royalties. The fingers of the glove form an M, which stands for Milwaukee, and the thumb and pocket of the glove form a lowercase letter B, which represents Brewers.

The logo was used by the Brewers from 1978 to 1993. From 1993 to 2019, the team used different logos but in 2006 the Brewers occasionally brought back the logo for some games. In 2019 the logo was used for 53 games. The logo's designer did not live to see the logo make a comeback. Meindel struggled with depression later in life and died by suicide on May 5, 2018.

In 2017, the team began exploring a logo redesign. The team hired a Hattiesburg, Mississippi, company called RARE Design to develop a new logo. The company selected the ball-in-glove logo, noting "how devoted fans still were to that symbol". The logo was released in 2020 to commemorate the team's 50th-anniversary celebration. Beginning in the 2020 season, the Brewers went back to the ball-in-glove logo on uniforms which they referred to as "retro-inspired".

== Description ==
The logo initially looks like a baseball glove or like a baseball glove and a baseball. Many people had trouble seeing the hidden imagery of the logo. Some called it "The Paw" because they thought it looked like a dog's paw. Upon further examination, it becomes apparent that the logo contains the letters "m" and a "b" which are formed in the shape of a baseball glove. The Milwaukee Journal Sentinel called the logo "one of the most celebrated hidden-meaning logos in sports and corporate history". Meindel said that he designed the logo with the blue color that the Brewers were already using, and he selected a gold with a deeper color for the second color. He also designed the logo to be instantly recognizable at any size, "from a pin to a billboard". In the current version, debuted in 2020, the logo has two slight alterations: the "M" and "B" are now connected by "webbing" of the glove, and the pattern of the ball in the center of the logo better resembles a baseball.

== Reception ==
CBS Sports said the ball-in-glove logo "might just be the best in all of baseball". Milwaukee Brewers vice president of corporate affairs Laurel Prieb said, "As the fans look back now, they remember not only the logo but that it symbolizes that golden six-year era when our team had its greatest success." In 2014, USA Today referred to the ball-in-glove logo as, "everyone’s favorite hidden logo element". By contrast, the Brewers logo currently being used that season "...contains no such magic, unless that magic is putting you to sleep". In 2018, the Brewers combined the flag of Milwaukee and the ball-in-glove logo to create a logo that was colored like the Milwaukee flag.
