= Beer Barrel Man =

Baseball team mascot

One version of Owgust, circa 1950

The Barrelman, also known as Owgust, is a mascot logo used by two baseball teams in Milwaukee nicknamed "Brewers".

== History ==
Santa Claus version of Owgust

When the Brewers began playing in the American Association of Professional Baseball in 1901 the Barrelman was associated with the team. In the 1940s the mascot was embraced by the team. The character was nicknamed Owgust and was used as a mascot for the Brewers from 1942 until 1952. The character resembled a beer barrel and had a tap in place of a nose. The Brewers general manager Rudie Schaffer is credited for popularizing Owgust in the 1940s. Also in the 1940s the team began promoting the Barrel Kid.

In the 1940s and 1950s, a whole series of Beer Barrel Men were used as logos by the club – pitching, batting, fielding balls and running the bases. The December 1944 issue of Brewer News, the club's newsletter, depicted Owgust in a Santa Claus suit and long white beard.

The Beer Barrel Man was used until spring training of 1953, when the Boston Braves displaced the Brewers in Milwaukee.

== Major Leagues ==
After the Braves moved to Atlanta after the 1965 season, former Braves minority owner Bud Selig announced the formation of a group to bring major league baseball club back to Milwaukee, adopting the batting Beer Barrel Man as his organization's logo.

When Selig's group was awarded the bankrupt American League Seattle Pilots franchise, he moved them to Milwaukee and the Beer Barrel Man made a comeback as the first logo of the new Milwaukee Brewers. The Beer Barrel Man was used by the American League club through the 1977 season.

In 1977, the Milwaukee Brewers sponsored a contest to replace the Barrelman logo. The team received 1,932 entries, from which they selected a logo designed by a 30-year-old college art student named Tom Meindel. The logo that was selected is known as the ball-in-glove logo.

== Legacy ==
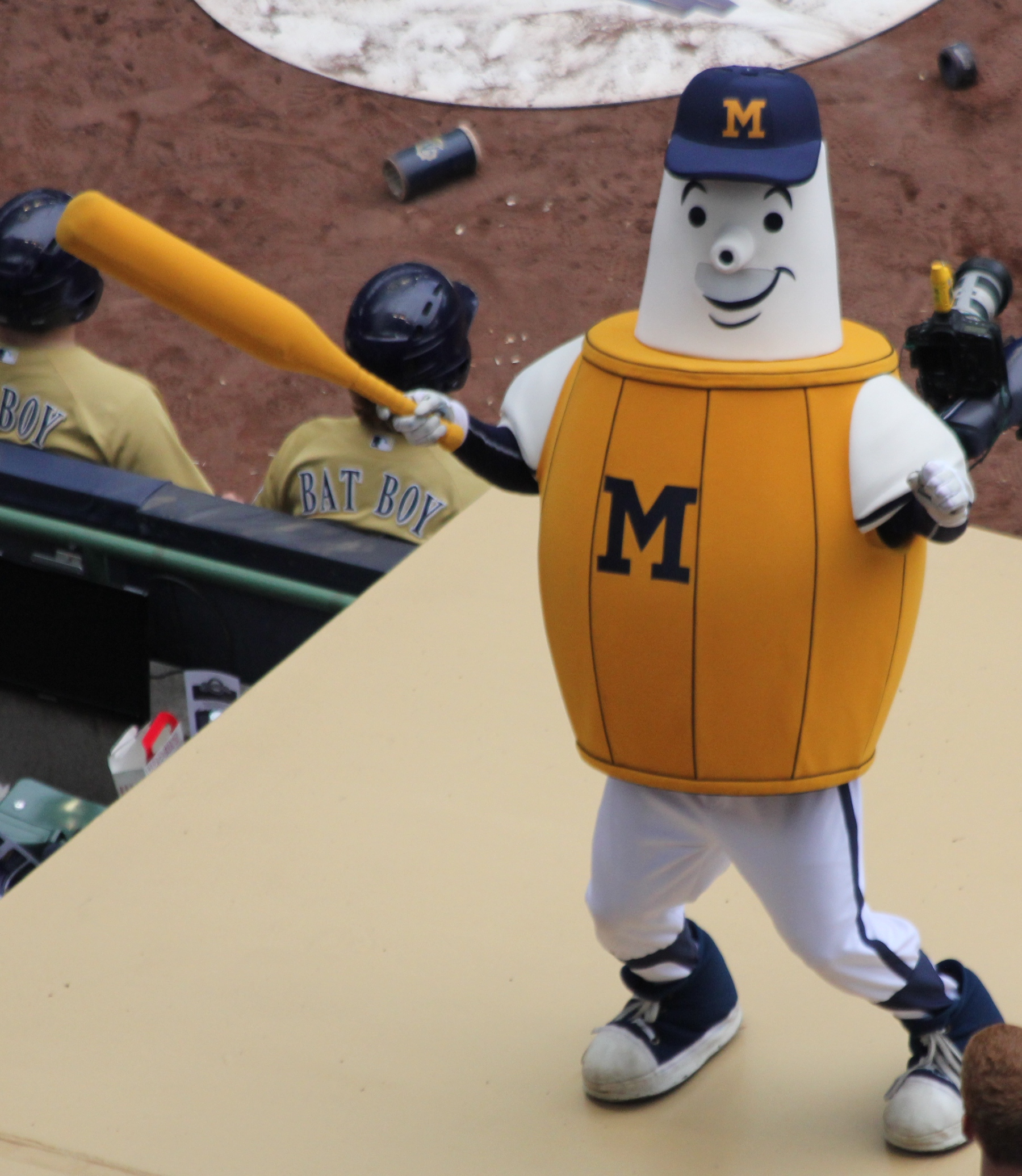
Barrelman on top of the Brewers dugout in 2015

Since then, he has made appearances on stadium giveaways, such as the 1999 Turn Ahead the Clock promotion, and has found new life on Cooperstown Collection merchandise.

The Beer Barrel Man was also featured in the winning design for the Brewers' "Design A Youniform" contest in 2013. The contest received nearly 700 entries and the winning design, created by Ben Peters of Richfield, Minnesota, used the Beer Barrelman as the cap logo and sleeve patch. This design was used in exhibitions games on March 22 in Arizona against the Chicago Cubs and once again March 30 in a game at Miller Park in Milwaukee against the Chicago White Sox.

In 2013, fans selected Bernie's Barrelman Ale as the name of a new craft beer, made by Leinenkugel's, in a poll on the team's website.

== Return in 2015 ==
On January 25, 2015, at their "On Deck" offseason event, the Brewers announced they would be bringing back the character, now named simply "Barrelman", as a costumed mascot.

== Other Brewers mascots ==
Barrelman is sometimes confused with Bernie Brewer. Bernie has always been a human figure, first a regular man in lederhosen and then a costumed human mascot suit.
