= 2024 Milwaukee Brewers season =

2024 Milwaukee Brewers
- National League Central champions
- League: National League
- Division: Central
- Ballpark: American Family Field
- City: Milwaukee, Wisconsin, United States
- Record: 93–69 (.574)
- Divisional place: 1st
- Owners: Mark Attanasio
- General managers: Matt Arnold
- Managers: Pat Murphy
- Television: Bally Sports Wisconsin (Brian Anderson, Bill Schroeder, Jeff Levering, Tim Dillard, Chris Singleton, Vinny Rottino, Jeff Cirillo, Sophia Minnaert) Telemundo Wisconsin (Spanish-language coverage, Sunday home games; Jaime Cano, Kevin Holden)
- Radio: 620 WTMJ; Milwaukee Brewers Radio Network (Bob Uecker, Jeff Levering, Lane Grindle, Josh Maurer)
- Stats: ESPN.com; Baseball Reference

The 2024 Milwaukee Brewers season was the 55th season for the Brewers in Milwaukee, their 27th in the National League, and their 56th overall. They entered the season as the defending National League Central Division champions.

On September 18, the Brewers clinched the National League Central division title for the second consecutive season as well as the first team of this baseball season to clinch a postseason berth when the Chicago Cubs lost to the Oakland Athletics. It was their third divisional title in four seasons. They lost to the New York Mets in the National League Wild Card Series in three games. It was the team's last season before the death of longtime broadcaster Bob Uecker.

== Offseason ==
The Brewers finished the 2023 season as the National League Central division champions, but were eliminated in the National League Wild Card series by the Arizona Diamondbacks.

=== Transactions ===
==== November 2023 ====
November 2	RHP Colin Rea, LHP Andrew Chafin, LHP Justin Wilson, C Víctor Caratini, DH/1B Darin Ruf, 3B Josh Donaldson, 1B Carlos Santana, OF Jesse Winker elected free agency. Brewers signed right-handed pitcher Colin Rea to a 1-year, $3.5 million contract.
November 4	Detroit Tigers traded right-handed pitcher Blake Holub to Milwaukee Brewers for outfielder Mark Canha. Left-handed pitcher Wade Miley elected free agency after declining his half of his mutual option with the team.
November 14	Philadelphia Phillies traded infielder Oliver Dunn to Milwaukee Brewers for outfielder Hendry Mendez and shortstop Robert Moore.
November 15	Oakland Athletics traded right-handed pitcher Chad Patrick to Milwaukee Brewers for infielder Abraham Toro.
November 17	New York Yankees traded outfielder/1st baseman Jake Bauers to Milwaukee Brewers for outfielders Jace Avina and Brian Sanchez. Brewers non-tendered the following arbitration eligible players: RHP Brandon Woodruff, DH/1B Rowdy Tellez and RHP J. C. Mejía.

==== December 2023 ====
December 4	Brewers signed outfielder Jackson Chourio to an 8-year, $82 million contract extension. Brewers signed left-handed pitcher Wade Miley to a 1-year, $8.5 million contract.
December 12	Brewers signed right-handed pitcher Joe Ross to a 1-year, $1.75 million contract.
December 14	Kansas City Royals traded right-handed pitcher Taylor Clarke to Milwaukee Brewers for right-handed pitcher Ryan Brady and shortstop Cam Devanney.
December 20	New York Mets traded right-handed pitcher Coleman Crow to Milwaukee Brewers for right-handed pitcher Adrian Houser and outfielder Tyrone Taylor. Brewers signed catcher/outfielder Eric Haase to a 1-year, $1 million contract.

==== January 2024 ====
January 26	Brewers signed 1st baseman Rhys Hoskins to a 2-year, $34 million contract.

==== February 2024 ====
February 1	Baltimore Orioles traded left-handed pitcher DL Hall, infielder Joey Ortiz and a 2024 draft pick to Milwaukee Brewers for right-handed pitcher Corbin Burnes.
February 6	San Francisco Giants traded cash to Milwaukee Brewers for left-handed pitcher Ethan Small.
February 7	Brewers signed right-handed pitcher Jakob Junis to a 1-year, $7 million contract
February 14	New York Yankees traded right-handed pitcher Joshua Quezada to Milwaukee Brewers for left-handed pitcher Clayton Andrews.

== Spring training ==
The Brewers finished spring training with a record of 16-15 (2 ties).

== Season standings ==
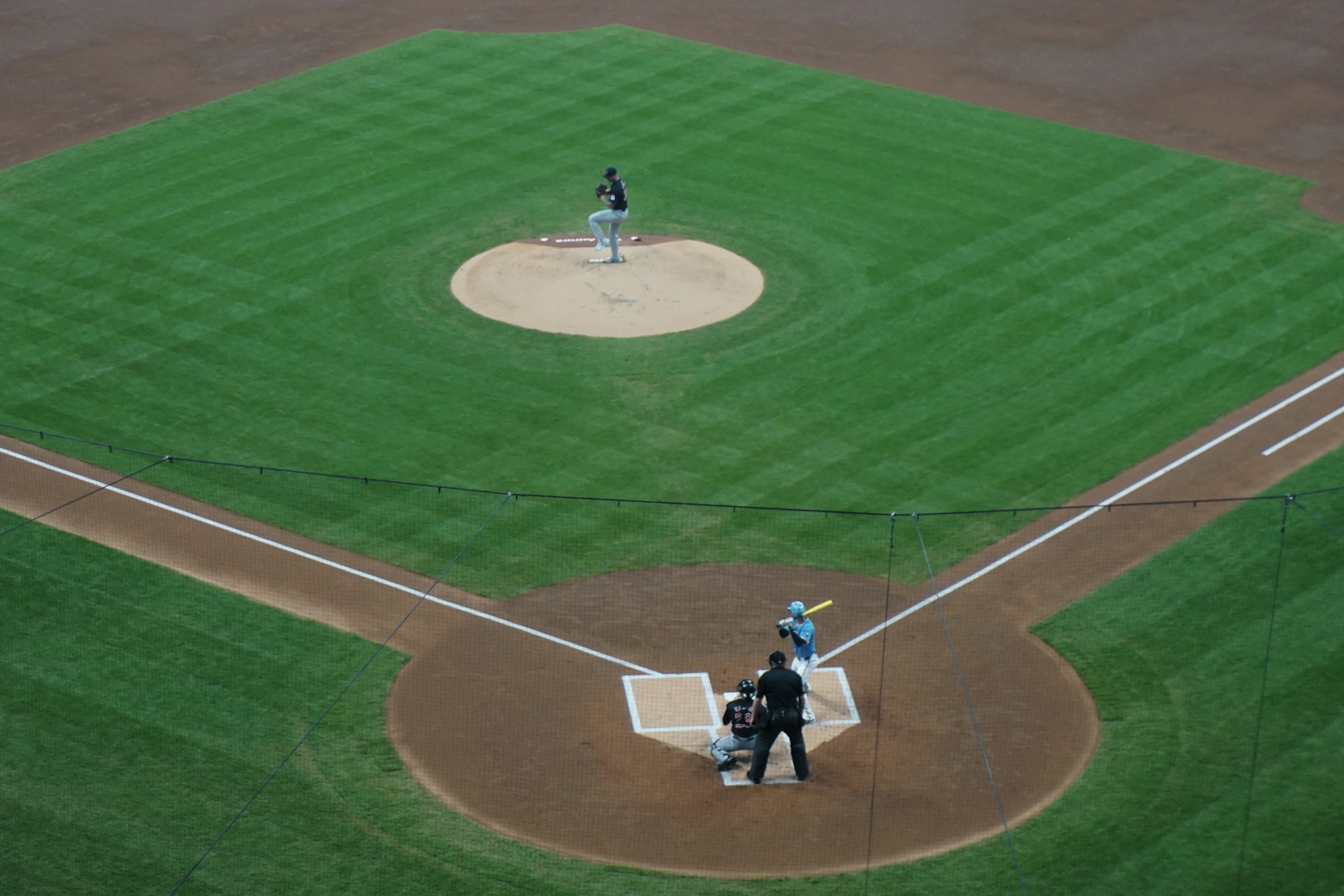
The Brewers playing against Cleveland on August 18

=== National League Central ===
NL Central
Team	W	L	Pct.	GB	Home	Road
Milwaukee Brewers	93	69	.574	—	47‍–‍34	46‍–‍35
St. Louis Cardinals	83	79	.512	10	44‍–‍37	39‍–‍42
Chicago Cubs	83	79	.512	10	44‍–‍37	39‍–‍42
Cincinnati Reds	77	85	.475	16	39‍–‍42	38‍–‍43
Pittsburgh Pirates	76	86	.469	17	39‍–‍42	37‍–‍44

=== National League Wild Card ===
Division leaders
Team	W	L	Pct.
Los Angeles Dodgers	98	64	.605
Philadelphia Phillies	95	67	.586
Milwaukee Brewers	93	69	.574

Wild Card teams (Top 3 teams qualify for postseason)
Team	W	L	Pct.	GB
San Diego Padres	93	69	.574	+4
Atlanta Braves	89	73	.549	—
New York Mets	89	73	.549	—
Arizona Diamondbacks	89	73	.549	—
St. Louis Cardinals	83	79	.512	6
Chicago Cubs	83	79	.512	6
San Francisco Giants	80	82	.494	9
Cincinnati Reds	77	85	.475	12
Pittsburgh Pirates	76	86	.469	13
Washington Nationals	71	91	.438	18
Miami Marlins	62	100	.383	27
Colorado Rockies	61	101	.377	28

=== Record vs. opponents ===
==== Record vs. National League ====
2024 National League record Source: MLB Standings Grid – 2024
Team	AZ	ATL	CHC	CIN	COL	LAD	MIA	MIL	NYM	PHI	PIT	SD	SF	STL	WSH	AL
Arizona	—	2–5	3–3	5–1	9–4	6–7	4–2	4–3	3–4	4–3	4–2	6–7	7–6	3–3	5–1	24–22
Atlanta	5–2	—	4–2	2–4	3–3	2–5	9–4	2–4	7–6	7–6	3–3	3–4	4–3	2–4	5–8	31–15
Chicago	3–3	2–4	—	5–8	4–2	4–2	4–3	5–8	3–4	2–4	7–6	2–4	3–4	6–7	6–1	27–19
Cincinnati	1–5	4–2	8–5	—	6–1	4–3	5–2	4–9	2–4	4–3	5–8	2–4	2–4	7–6	2–4	21–25
Colorado	4–9	3–3	2–4	1–6	—	3–10	2–5	4–3	2–4	2–4	2–4	8–5	3–10	3–4	2–4	20–26
Los Angeles	7–6	5–2	2–4	3–4	10–3	—	5–1	4–3	4–2	1–5	4–2	5–8	9–4	5–2	4–2	30–16
Miami	2–4	4–9	3–4	2–5	5–2	1–5	—	4–2	6–7	6–7	0–7	2–4	3–3	3–3	2–11	19–27
Milwaukee	3–4	4–2	8–5	9–4	3–4	3–4	2–4	—	5–1	2–4	7–6	2–5	4–2	8–5	2–4	31–15
New York	4–3	6–7	4–3	4–2	4–2	2–4	7–6	1–5	—	6–7	5–2	5–2	2–4	4–2	11–2	24–22
Philadelphia	3–4	6–7	4–2	3–4	4–2	5–1	7–6	4–2	7–6	—	3–4	5–1	5–2	4–2	9–4	26–20
Pittsburgh	2–4	3–3	6–7	8–5	4–2	2–4	7–0	6–7	2–5	4–3	—	0–6	2–4	5–8	4–3	20–26
San Diego	7–6	4–3	4–2	4–2	5–8	8–5	4–2	5–2	2–5	1–5	6–0	—	7–6	3–4	6–0	27–19
San Francisco	6–7	3–4	4–3	4–2	10–3	4–9	3–3	2–4	4–2	2–5	4–2	6–7	—	1–5	4–3	23–23
St. Louis	3–3	4–2	7–6	6–7	4–3	2–5	3–3	5–8	2–4	2–4	8–5	4–3	5–1	—	4–3	24–22
Washington	1–5	8–5	1–6	4–2	4–2	2–4	11–2	4–2	2–11	4–9	3–4	0–6	3–4	3–4	—	21–25

Updated with the results of all games through September 30, 2024.

==== Record vs. American League ====
2024 National League record vs. American League Source: MLB Standings
Team	BAL	BOS	CWS	CLE	DET	HOU	KC	LAA	MIN	NYY	OAK	SEA	TB	TEX	TOR
Arizona	1–2	3–0	2–1	3–0	1–2	1–2	2–1	2–1	1–2	1–2	2–1	1–2	0–3	2–2	2–1
Atlanta	1–2	3–1	1–2	2–1	3–0	3–0	2–1	2–1	3–0	2–1	2–1	1–2	2–1	2–1	2–1
Chicago	3–0	1–2	4–0	0–3	2–1	3–0	2–1	2–1	2–1	1–2	1–2	2–1	1–2	1–2	2–1
Cincinnati	0–3	1–2	3–0	1–3	0–3	3–0	0–3	3–0	2–1	3–0	1–2	0–3	1–2	1–2	2–1
Colorado	1–2	2–1	1–2	2–1	1–2	0–4	2–1	2–1	1–2	1–2	1–2	1–2	1–2	3–0	1–2
Los Angeles	2–1	3–0	3–0	2–1	1–2	1–2	2–1	2–2	2–1	2–1	2–1	3–0	2–1	1–2	2–1
Miami	2–1	0–3	2–1	1–2	2–1	0–3	1–2	0–3	2–1	1–2	1–2	2–1	1–3	1–2	3–0
Milwaukee	2–1	2–1	3–0	3–0	2–1	1–2	1–2	2–1	3–1	1–2	2–1	2–1	2–1	3–0	2–1
New York	2–1	3–0	3–0	0–3	1–2	1–2	2–1	1–2	2–1	4–0	1–2	0–3	0–3	2–1	2–1
Philadelphia	1–2	1–2	3–0	1–2	2–1	2–1	2–1	2–1	1–2	0–3	1–2	1–2	3–0	3–0	3–1
Pittsburgh	2–1	0–3	3–0	1–2	2–2	2–1	1–2	1–2	2–1	2–1	0–3	2–1	1–2	1–2	1–2
San Diego	2–1	2–1	3–0	2–1	2–1	2–1	2–1	0–3	2–1	1–2	3–0	1–3	2–1	2–1	1–2
San Francisco	2–1	1–2	2–1	1–2	2–1	2–1	3–0	1–2	2–1	0–3	2–2	1–2	1–2	2–1	1–2
St. Louis	3–0	2–1	1–2	2–1	1–2	1–2	1–3	2–1	2–1	2–1	2–1	1–2	2–1	2–1	0–3
Washington	2–2	1–2	1–2	1–2	2–1	2–1	0–3	2–1	1–2	2–1	1–2	2–1	1–2	1–2	2–1

Updated with the results of all games through September 30, 2024.

== Roster ==
2024 Milwaukee Brewers
Roster
Pitchers: 26 Aaron Ashby; 25 Bradley Blalock; 50 J. B. Bukauskas; 32 Aaron Civale; 54 Robert Gasser; 37 DL Hall; 57 Kevin Herget; 25 Elieser Hernández; 52 Bryan Hudson; 54 Tyler Jay; 35 Jakob Junis; 56 Janson Junk; 60 Dallas Keuchel; 35,47 Jared Koenig; 25 Nick Mears; 58 James Meeker; 29 Trevor Megill; 20 Wade Miley; 55 Hoby Milner; 47 Frankie Montas; 36 Tobias Myers; 49 Enoli Paredes; 31 Joel Payamps; 59 Elvis Peguero; 51 Freddy Peralta; 48 Colin Rea; 00 Carlos Rodríguez; 41 Joe Ross; 45 Abner Uribe; 49 Thyago Vieira; 58 Mitch White; 38 Devin Williams; 46 Bryse Wilson; 58 Rob Zastryzny	Catchers: 24 William Contreras; 13 Eric Haase; 99 Gary Sánchez; Infielders: 27 Willy Adames; 9 Jake Bauers; 7 Tyler Black; 18 Vinny Capra; 15 Oliver Dunn; 12 Rhys Hoskins; 6 Owen Miller; 14 Andruw Monasterio; 3 Joey Ortiz; 2 Brice Turang	Outfielders: 11 Jackson Chourio; 6 Isaac Collins; 10 Sal Frelick; 28 Brewer Hicklen; 5 Garrett Mitchell; 16 Blake Perkins; 18 Chris Roller; 28 Joey Wiemer; 22 Christian Yelich	Manager: 21 Pat Murphy; Coaches: 33 Quintin Berry (first base); 97 Christian Correa (bullpen catcher); 65 Néstor Corredor (field coordinator); 70 Connor Dawson (hitting); 95 Daniel de Mondesert (assistant); 61 Jim Henderson (assistant pitching); 84 Chris Hook (pitching); 88 Charlie Greene (bullpen); 40 Jason Lane (third base); 63 Walker McKinven (run prevention); 43 Ozzie Timmons (hitting); 23 Rickie Weeks Jr. (associate manager); 62 Adam Weisenburger (bullpen catcher)

== Player stats ==
= Indicates team leader

=== Batting ===
Note: G = Games played; AB = At bats; R = Runs scored; H = Hits; 2B = Doubles; 3B = Triples; HR = Home runs; RBI = Runs batted in; SB = Stolen bases; BB = Walks; AVG = Batting average; SLG = Slugging average

Player	G	AB	R	H	2B	3B	HR	RBI	SB	BB	AVG	SLG
Willy Adames	161	610	93	153	33	0	32	112	21	74	.251	.462
William Contreras	155	595	99	167	37	2	23	92	9	78	.281	.466
Brice Turang	155	559	72	142	24	4	7	57	50	50	.254	.349
Jackson Chourio	148	528	80	145	29	4	21	79	22	39	.275	.464
Sal Frelick	145	475	66	123	22	4	2	32	18	39	.259	.335
Rhys Hoskins	131	449	59	96	14	0	26	82	3	53	.214	.419
Joey Ortiz	142	440	58	105	25	6	11	60	11	56	.239	.398
Blake Perkins	121	383	54	92	13	2	6	43	23	42	.240	.332
Jake Bauers	116	302	45	60	9	2	12	43	13	39	.199	.361
Christian Yelich	73	270	44	85	12	3	11	42	21	40	.315	.504
Gary Sánchez	89	245	30	54	7	1	11	37	0	27	.220	.392
Garrett Mitchell	69	196	33	50	12	3	8	21	11	25	.255	.469
Andruw Monasterio	59	125	14	26	5	0	1	16	6	16	.208	.272
Oliver Dunn	41	95	11	21	2	2	1	7	3	6	.221	.316
Eric Haase	30	66	10	18	1	0	5	14	0	3	.273	.515
Tyler Black	18	49	4	10	2	0	0	2	3	7	.204	.245
Owen Miller	14	27	2	5	1	0	0	3	0	0	.185	.222
Joey Wiemer	19	26	2	4	0	0	0	0	1	1	.154	.154
Isaac Collins	11	17	0	2	0	0	0	0	1	2	.118	.118
Vinny Capra	3	9	1	1	1	0	0	0	0	0	.111	.222
Brewer Hicklen	3	5	0	0	0	0	0	0	1	0	.000	.000
Chris Roller	1	1	0	0	0	0	0	0	0	0	.000	.000
Team totals	162	5472	777	1359	249	33	177	742	217	597	.248	.403

Source:Baseball Reference

=== Pitching ===
Note: W = Wins; L = Losses; ERA = Earned run average; G = Games pitched; GS = Games started; SV = Saves; IP = Innings pitched; H = Hits allowed; R = Runs allowed; ER = Earned runs allowed; BB = Walks allowed; SO = Strikeouts

Player	W	L	ERA	G	GS	SV	IP	H	R	ER	BB	SO
Freddy Peralta	11	9	3.68	32	32	0	173.2	143	74	71	68	200
Colin Rea	12	6	4.29	32	27	1	167.2	169	83	80	43	135
Tobias Myers	9	6	3.00	27	25	0	138.0	126	52	46	36	127
Bryse Wilson	5	4	4.04	34	9	0	104.2	102	49	47	31	82
Aaron Civale	6	3	3.53	14	14	0	74.0	65	31	29	25	65
Joe Ross	3	6	3.77	25	10	0	74.0	72	35	31	29	66
Hoby Milner	5	1	4.73	61	1	1	64.2	63	38	34	14	64
Bryan Hudson	6	1	1.73	43	0	0	62.1	28	12	12	17	62
Jared Koenig	9	4	2.47	55	6	1	62.0	54	22	17	23	63
Joel Payamps	3	7	3.05	68	0	6	59.0	39	23	20	18	59
Frankie Montas	3	3	4.55	11	11	0	57.1	47	33	29	25	70
Elvis Peguero	7	4	2.98	52	0	2	51.1	52	22	17	27	47
Trevor Megill	1	3	2.72	48	0	21	46.1	33	16	14	14	50
DL Hall	1	2	5.02	13	7	0	43.0	48	26	24	21	44
Aaron Ashby	1	2	2.86	14	2	0	28.1	20	13	9	10	33
Robert Gasser	2	0	2.57	5	5	0	28.0	28	9	8	1	16
Jakob Junis	4	0	2.42	10	1	1	26.0	20	9	7	5	19
Thyago Vieira	0	0	5.64	16	0	1	22.1	25	14	14	13	25
Devin Williams	1	0	1.25	22	0	14	21.2	10	3	3	11	38
Enoli Paredes	1	0	1.74	17	0	1	20.2	13	4	4	10	14
Dallas Keuchel	0	0	5.40	4	4	0	16.2	23	10	10	8	11
Abner Uribe	2	2	6.91	14	0	3	14.1	15	11	11	12	14
Carlos Rodríguez	0	3	7.30	3	3	0	12.1	19	11	10	3	9
Nick Mears	0	1	7.30	13	0	0	12.1	14	10	10	3	18
Kevin Herget	0	0	1.59	7	0	1	11.1	6	2	2	3	9
Mitch White	0	1	6.48	6	0	0	8.1	8	8	6	4	6
Janson Junk	0	0	6.75	5	0	0	8.0	16	6	6	2	8
Rob Zastryzny	1	0	1.17	9	3	0	7.2	4	1	1	1	5
Wade Miley	0	1	6.43	2	2	0	7.0	6	5	5	4	2
Elieser Hernández	0	0	3.00	4	0	0	6.0	5	2	2	2	2
J. B. Bukauskas	0	0	1.50	6	0	0	6.0	3	1	1	1	6
Jake Bauers	0	0	4.50	4	0	0	4.0	5	2	2	4	1
Tyler Jay	0	0	0.00	2	0	0	3.0	2	0	0	3	3
Owen Miller	0	0	18.00	1	0	0	2.0	5	4	4	1	0
Bradley Blalock	0	0	0.00	1	0	0	1.0	0	0	0	1	0
James Meeker	0	0	0.00	1	0	0	1.0	1	0	0	1	0
Team totals	93	69	3.65	162	162	53	1446.0	1289	641	586	494	1373

Source:Baseball Reference

== Game log ==
=== Regular season ===
Legend
	Brewers win
	Brewers loss
	Postponement
	Clinched division
**Bold**	Brewers team member

2024 regular season game log: 93–69 (Home: 47–34; Away: 46–35)
March–April: 18–11 (Home: 6–7; Away: 12–4)

#	Date	Opponent	Score	Win	Loss	Save	Attendance	Record	Box/ Streak
—	March 28	@ Mets	Postponed (rain); Makeup: March 29						
1	March 29	@ Mets	3–1	**Peralta** (1–0)	Quintana (0–1)	**Uribe** (1)	42,137	1–0	W1
2	March 30	@ Mets	7–6	**Peguero** (1–0)	Severino (0–1)	**Uribe** (2)	30,296	2–0	W2
3	March 31	@ Mets	4–1	**Rea** (1–0)	Megill (0–1)	**Payamps** (1)	22,222	3–0	W3
4	April 2	Twins	3–2	**Peguero** (2–0)	Varland (0–1)	**Uribe** (3)	41,659	4–0	W4
5	April 3	Twins	3–7	Duarte (1–0)	**Payamps** (0–1)	—	17,854	4–1	L1
6	April 5	Mariners	6–5	**Uribe** (1–0)	Muñoz (0–1)	—	23,035	5–1	W1
7	April 6	Mariners	3–5	Miller (1–1)	**Hall** (0–1)	Muñoz (2)	35,522	5–2	L1
8	April 7	Mariners	12–4	**Rea** (2–0)	Hancock (1–1)	**Vieira** (1)	25,573	6–2	W1
9	April 8	@ Reds	8–10	Ashcraft (1–1)	**Ashby** (0–1)	Díaz (2)	10,382	6–3	L1
10	April 9	@ Reds	9–5	**Ross** (1–0)	Montas (2–1)	—	12,623	7–3	W1
11	April 10	@ Reds	7–2	**Wilson** (1–0)	Greene (0–1)	—	10,388	8–3	W2
—	April 11	@ Reds	Postponed (rain); Makeup: August 30						
12	April 12	@ Orioles	11–1	**Peralta** (2–0)	Wells (0–2)	—	32,205	9–3	W3
13	April 13	@ Orioles	11–5	**Peguero** (3–0)	Kremer (0–1)	—	24,327	10–3	W4
14	April 14	@ Orioles	4–6	Canó (2–1)	**Uribe** (1–1)	Kimbrel (3)	35,085	10–4	L1
15	April 15	Padres	3–7	Musgrove (2–2)	**Ross** (1–1)	Suárez (6)	18,396	10–5	L2
16	April 16	Padres	3–6	Cease (2–1)	**Miley** (0–1)	—	20,034	10–6	L3
17	April 17	Padres	1–0	**Uribe** (2–1)	King (2–1)	**Payamps** (2)	24,521	11–6	W1
18	April 19	@ Cardinals	2–1 (10)	**Payamps** (1–1)	Helsley (1–2)	**Milner** (1)	40,147	12–6	W2
19	April 20	@ Cardinals	12–5	**Wilson** (2–0)	Mikolas (1–3)	—	41,949	13–6	W3
20	April 21	@ Cardinals	2–0	**Hudson** (1–0)	Gray (2–1)	**Payamps** (3)	40,715	14–6	W4
21	April 22	@ Pirates	2–4	Jones (2–2)	**Ross** (1–2)	Bednar (3)	8,461	14–7	L1
22	April 23	@ Pirates	1–2	Falter (2–1)	**Myers** (0–1)	Bednar (4)	9,107	14–8	L2
23	April 24	@ Pirates	3–2	**Hudson** (2–0)	Fleming (1–1)	**Payamps** (4)	10,370	15–8	W1
24	April 25	@ Pirates	7–5	**Koenig** (1–0)	Chapman (0–2)	**Megill** (1)	11,570	16–8	W2
25	April 26	Yankees	7–6 (11)	**Koenig** (2–0)	Tonkin (1–3)	—	32,314	17–8	W3
26	April 27	Yankees	3–15	Rodón (2–1)	**Ross** (1–3)	—	41,620	17–9	L1
27	April 28	Yankees	5–15	Marinaccio (1–0)	**Uribe** (2–2)	—	35,295	17–10	L2
28	April 29	Rays	0–1	Pepiot (3–2)	**Wilson** (2–1)	Adam (1)	20,395	17–11	L3
29	April 30	Rays	8–2	**Peralta** (3–0)	Alexander (1–1)	—	21,124	18–11	W1

May: 16–12 (Home: 10–3; Away: 6–9)

#	Date	Opponent	Score	Win	Loss	Save	Attendance	Record	Box/ Streak
30	May 1	Rays	7–1	**Rea** (3–0)	Eflin (1–4)	—	20,132	19–11	W2
31	May 3	@ Cubs	3–1	**Peguero** (4–0)	Alzolay (1–4)	**Megill** (2)	33,557	20–11	W3
32	May 4	@ Cubs	5–6	Taillon (3–0)	**Myers** (0–2)	Neris (6)	40,505	20–12	L1
33	May 5	@ Cubs	0–5	Assad (3–0)	**Peralta** (3–1)	—	39,299	20–13	L2
34	May 6	@ Royals	2–3	Anderson (2–1)	**Koenig** (2–1)	Stratton (2)	10,005	20–14	L3
35	May 7	@ Royals	6–5	**Koenig** (3–1)	McArthur (1–2)	**Megill** (3)	14,657	21–14	W1
36	May 8	@ Royals	4–6	Singer (3–1)	**Ross** (1–4)	McArthur (8)	22,430	21–15	L1
37	May 9	Cardinals	7–1	**Koenig** (4–1)	Gray (4–2)	—	25,031	22–15	W1
38	May 10	Cardinals	11–2	**Gasser** (1–0)	Lynn (1–1)	**Herget** (1)	30,104	23–15	W2
39	May 11	Cardinals	5–3	**Milner** (1–0)	Kittredge (0–2)	**Megill** (4)	34,028	24–15	W3
40	May 12	Cardinals	3–4	Mikolas (3–5)	**Peguero** (4–1)	Helsley (12)	36,895	24–16	L1
41	May 13	Pirates	6–8	Keller (4–3)	**Rea** (3–1)	Bednar (8)	18,305	24–17	L2
42	May 14	Pirates	4–3	**Ross** (2–4)	Priester (0–4)	**Megill** (5)	19,532	25–17	W1
43	May 15	Pirates	10–2	**Gasser** (2–0)	Pérez (1–3)	—	32,848	26–17	W2
44	May 17	@ Astros	4–5	Brown (1–4)	**Peralta** (3–2)	Hader (6)	31,334	26–18	L1
45	May 18	@ Astros	4–2	**Milner** (2–0)	Verlander (2–2)	**Megill** (6)	34,212	27–18	W1
46	May 19	@ Astros	4–9	Arrighetti (2–4)	**Rea** (3–2)	—	34,045	27–19	L1
47	May 20	@ Marlins	2–3 (10)	Scott (4–4)	**White** (1–1)	—	8,255	27–20	L2
48	May 21	@ Marlins	7–5	**Myers** (1–2)	Puk (0–5)	**Megill** (7)	6,799	28–20	W1
49	May 22	@ Marlins	0–1	Luzardo (2–3)	**Peralta** (3–3)	Scott (6)	7,792	28–21	L1
50	May 24	@ Red Sox	7–2	**Wilson** (3–1)	Crawford (2–3)	—	30,992	29–21	W1
51	May 25	@ Red Sox	6–3	**Rea** (4–2)	Pivetta (2–3)	**Megill** (8)	34,822	30–21	W2
52	May 26	@ Red Sox	1–2	Slaten (3–2)	**Peguero** (4–2)	Jansen (9)	34,078	30–22	L1
53	May 27	Cubs	5–1	**Hudson** (3–0)	Leiter Jr. (1–3)	—	41,882	31–22	W1
54	May 28	Cubs	3–6 (10)	Neris (5–0)	**Megill** (0–1)	—	24,076	31–23	L1
55	May 29	Cubs	10–6	**Koenig** (5–1)	Imanaga (5–1)	—	26,695	32–23	W1
56	May 30	Cubs	6–4	**Hudson** (4–0)	Little (1–1)	**Peguero** (1)	33,219	33–23	W2
57	May 31	White Sox	12–5	**Paredes** (1–0)	Soroka (0–6)	—	30,931	34–23	W3

June: 16–11 (Home: 11–3; Away: 5–8)

#	Date	Opponent	Score	Win	Loss	Save	Attendance	Record	Box/ Streak
58	June 1	White Sox	4–3 (10)	**Milner** (3–0)	Kopech (1–5)	—	36,017	35–23	W4
59	June 2	White Sox	6–3	**Peralta** (4–3)	Nastrini (0–5)	**Paredes** (1)	30,442	36–23	W5
60	June 3	@ Phillies	1–3	Wheeler (7–3)	**Wilson** (3–2)	Alvarado (10)	43,553	36–24	L1
61	June 4	@ Phillies	1–2 (10)	Domínguez (2–2)	**Payamps** (1–2)	—	40,632	36–25	L2
62	June 5	@ Phillies	0–2	Nola (8–2)	**Ashby** (0–2)	Alvarado (11)	38,910	36–26	L3
63	June 7	@ Tigers	10–0	**Myers** (2–2)	Olson (1–7)	—	24,512	37–26	W1
64	June 8	@ Tigers	5–4	**Koenig** (6–1)	Mize (1–4)	**Megill** (9)	32,333	38–26	W2
65	June 9	@ Tigers	2–10	Skubal (8–1)	**Wilson** (3–3)	—	24,077	38–27	L1
66	June 10	Blue Jays	3–1	**Rea** (5–2)	Berríos (5–5)	**Megill** (10)	24,381	39–27	W1
67	June 11	Blue Jays	0–3	Kikuchi (4–5)	**Rodríguez** (0–1)	García (5)	25,253	39–28	L1
68	June 12	Blue Jays	5–4	**Myers** (3–2)	Pop (0–1)	**Megill** (11)	30,444	40–28	W1
69	June 14	Reds	5–6	Greene (5–2)	**Peralta** (4–4)	Díaz (15)	32,810	40–29	L1
70	June 15	Reds	3–1	**Wilson** (4–3)	Abbott (5–6)	**Megill** (12)	38,419	41–29	W1
71	June 16	Reds	5–4	**Rea** (6–2)	Sims (1–3)	**Megill** (13)	41,676	42–29	W2
72	June 17	@ Angels	3–5	Plesac (1–0)	**Rodríguez** (0–2)	Estévez (13)	26,575	42–30	L1
73	June 18	@ Angels	6–3	**Myers** (4–2)	Canning (2–8)	**Megill** (14)	27,967	43–30	W1
74	June 19	@ Angels	2–0	**Peralta** (5–4)	Anderson (6–7)	**Megill** (15)	28,483	44–30	W2
75	June 20	@ Padres	6–7	Estrada (3–1)	**Payamps** (1–3)	—	42,644	44–31	L1
76	June 21	@ Padres	5–9	Kolek (1–0)	**Milner** (3–1)	De Los Santos (1)	41,282	44–32	L2
77	June 22	@ Padres	4–6	Vásquez (2–4)	**Rodríguez** (0–3)	Suárez (19)	39,658	44–33	L3
78	June 23	@ Padres	6–2	**Myers** (5–2)	King (5–5)	—	42,048	45–33	W1
79	June 24	Rangers	6–3	**Peguero** (5–2)	Latz (2–2)	**Megill** (16)	27,924	46–33	W2
80	June 25	Rangers	3–1	**Wilson** (5–3)	Heaney (2–9)	**Peguero** (2)	30,892	47–33	W3
81	June 26	Rangers	6–5 (10)	**Koenig** (7–1)	Latz (2–3)	—	36,552	48–33	W4
82	June 28	Cubs	4–2	**Rea** (7–2)	Taillon (4–4)	**Megill** (17)	39,298	49–33	W5
83	June 29	Cubs	3–5	Little (3–1)	**Payamps** (1–4)	Neris (11)	42,238	49–34	L1
84	June 30	Cubs	7–1	**Peralta** (6–4)	Hendricks (1–6)	—	42,658	50–34	W1

July: 11–13 (Home: 4–8; Away: 7–5)

#	Date	Opponent	Score	Win	Loss	Save	Attendance	Record	Box/ Streak
85	July 1	@ Rockies	7–8 (10)	Kinley (4–1)	**Payamps** (1–5)	—	26,204	50–35	L1
86	July 2	@ Rockies	4–3	**Zastryzny** (1–0)	Mears (1–4)	**Megill** (18)	25,669	51–35	W1
87	July 3	@ Rockies	3–0	**Rea** (8–2)	Hudson (2–12)	**Junis** (1)	34,177	52–35	W2
88	July 4	@ Rockies	3–4	Molina (1–0)	**Myers** (5–3)	Beeks (7)	48,705	52–36	L1
89	July 5	@ Dodgers	5–8	Hudson (6–1)	**Peguero** (5–3)	Phillips (14)	49,885	52–37	L2
90	July 6	@ Dodgers	3–5	Phillips (2–0)	**Hudson** (4–1)	Vesia (5)	50,086	52–38	L3
91	July 7	@ Dodgers	9–2	**Junis** (1–0)	Wrobleski (0–1)	—	43,528	53–38	W1
92	July 9	Pirates	2–12	Priester (1–5)	**Rea** (8–3)	—	26,422	53–39	L1
93	July 10	Pirates	9–0	**Myers** (6–3)	Pérez (1–5)	—	27,294	54–39	W1
94	July 11	Pirates	0–1	Skenes (6–0)	**Civale** (2–7)	Chapman (4)	36,743	54–40	L1
95	July 12	Nationals	2–5	Garcia (1–3)	**Peralta** (6–5)	Finnegan (24)	31,967	54–41	L2
96	July 13	Nationals	5–6	Law (5–2)	**Megill** (0–2)	Finnegan (25)	34,169	54–42	L3
97	July 14	Nationals	9–3	**Rea** (9–3)	Irvin (7–8)	—	35,040	55–42	W1
ASG	July 16	NL @ AL	3–5	Miller (1–0)	Greene (0–1)	Clase (1)	39,343	—	ASG
98	July 20	@ Twins	8–4 (12)	**Junis** (2–0)	Okert (3–1)	—	41,679	56–42	W2
99	July 21	@ Twins	8–7	**Koenig** (8–1)	Jax (3–4)	**Megill** (19)	36,327	57–42	W3
100	July 22	@ Cubs	1–3	Smyly (3–5)	**Myers** (6–4)	Neris (14)	35,741	57–43	L1
101	July 23	@ Cubs	1–0	**Peguero** (6–3)	Taillon (7–5)	**Megill** (20)	37,651	58–43	W1
102	July 24	@ Cubs	3–2	**Junis** (3–0)	Neris (8–3)	**Payamps** (5)	37,679	59–43	W2
103	July 26	Marlins	2–6	Rogers (2–9)	**Peralta** (6–6)	—	30,128	59–44	L1
104	July 27	Marlins	3–7	Hoeing (1–2)	**Koenig** (8–2)	—	36,171	59–45	L2
105	July 28	Marlins	6–2	**Junis** (4–0)	Tyler (0–2)	—	32,946	60–45	W1
106	July 29	Braves	8–3	**Milner** (4–1)	Chavez (1–2)	—	28,698	61–45	W2
107	July 30	Braves	1–5	Elder (2–4)	**Ross** (2–5)	—	28,810	61–46	L1
108	July 31	Braves	2–6	Johnson (4–2)	**Koenig** (8–3)	—	37,111	61–47	L2

August: 19–9 (Home: 9–4; Away: 10–5)

#	Date	Opponent	Score	Win	Loss	Save	Attendance	Record	Box/ Streak
109	August 2	@ Nationals	8–3	**Montas** (5–8)	Irvin (8–9)	—	22,132	62–47	W1
110	August 3	@ Nationals	4–6	Herz (2–4)	**Civale** (2–8)	Finnegan (29)	30,577	62–48	L1
111	August 4	@ Nationals	3–4	Parker (6–6)	**Myers** (6–5)	Finnegan (30)	18,748	62–49	L2
112	August 6	@ Braves	10–0	**Rea** (10–3)	Elder (2–5)	—	38,701	63–49	W1
113	August 7	@ Braves	8–5	**Peralta** (7–6)	Johnson (4–4)	—	33,281	64–49	W2
114	August 8	@ Braves	16–7	**Peguero** (7–3)	Morton (6–7)	—	29,935	65–49	W3
115	August 9	Reds	8–3	**Civale** (3–8)	Spiers (4–4)	—	37,742	66–49	W4
116	August 10	Reds	1–0	**Payamps** (2–5)	Santillan (0–1)	**Williams** (1)	38,639	67–49	W5
117	August 11	Reds	3–4	Farmer (2–0)	**Ross** (2–6)	Díaz (23)	40,049	67–50	L1
118	August 12	Dodgers	2–5	Kershaw (1–2)	**Peralta** (7–7)	Hudson (9)	33,618	67–51	L2
119	August 13	Dodgers	2–7	Stone (10–5)	**Rea** (10–4)	Knack (1)	29,174	67–52	L3
120	August 14	Dodgers	5–4	**Payamps** (3–5)	Honeywell Jr. (0–1)	**Williams** (2)	31,084	68–52	W1
121	August 15	Dodgers	6–4	**Hudson** (5–1)	Hudson (6–2)	**Williams** (3)	40,447	69–52	W2
122	August 16	Guardians	5–3	**Civale** (4–8)	Williams (2–5)	**Payamps** (6)	30,346	70–52	W3
123	August 17	Guardians	2–1	**Peralta** (8–7)	Bibee (10–5)	**Williams** (4)	37,518	71–52	W4
124	August 18	Guardians	2–0	**Rea** (11–4)	Lively (10–8)	**Koenig** (1)	34,483	72–52	W5
125	August 20	@ Cardinals	3–2	**Montas** (6–8)	Fedde (8–7)	**Williams** (5)	30,022	73–52	W6
126	August 21	@ Cardinals	6–10 (10)	Helsley (5–4)	**Megill** (0–3)	—	29,580	73–53	L1
127	August 22	@ Cardinals	0–3	Kittredge (2–4)	**Mears** (1–5)	Helsley (39)	28,730	73–54	L2
128	August 23	@ Athletics	11–3	**Hudson** (6–1)	Sears (10–9)	—	14,031	74–54	W1
129	August 24	@ Athletics	9–5	**Rea** (12–4)	Boyle (3–6)	—	12,769	75–54	W2
130	August 25	@ Athletics	3–4	Estes (6–6)	**Montas** (6–9)	Miller (21)	15,961	75–55	L1
131	August 27	Giants	4–5	Doval (5–1)	**Payamps** (3–6)	Walker (4)	24,354	75–56	L2
132	August 28	Giants	5–3	**Peralta** (9–7)	Harrison (7–6)	**Williams** (6)	23,247	76–56	W1
133	August 29	Giants	6–0	**Civale** (5–8)	Birdsong (3–4)	—	30,920	77–56	W2
134	August 30 (1)	@ Reds	5–4 (10)	**Megill** (1–3)	Díaz (1–5)	**Williams** (7)	14,436	78–56	W3
135	August 30 (2)	@ Reds	14–0	**Hall** (1–1)	Lowder (0–1)	—	22,488	79–56	W4
136	August 31	@ Reds	5–4	**Ashby** (1–2)	Wilson (1–4)	**Williams** (8)	27,881	80–56	W5

September: 13–13 (Home: 7–9; Away: 6–4)

#	Date	Opponent	Score	Win	Loss	Save	Attendance	Record	Box/ Streak
137	September 1	@ Reds	3–4 (11)	Díaz (2–5)	**Wilson** (5–4)	—	26,457	80–57	L1
138	September 2	Cardinals	9–3	**Peralta** (10–7)	Pallante (6–7)	—	41,731	81–57	W1
139	September 3	Cardinals	4–7 (12)	Helsley (7–4)	**Peguero** (7–4)	—	20,027	81–58	L1
140	September 4	Cardinals	2–3 (10)	Kittredge (3–4)	**Payamps** (3–7)	Fernandez (2)	20,027	81–59	L2
141	September 6	Rockies	2–3	Feltner (2–10)	**Montas** (6–10)	Kinley (10)	26,582	81–60	L3
142	September 7	Rockies	5–2	**Myers** (7–5)	Blach (3–8)	**Williams** (9)	33,603	82–60	W1
143	September 8	Rockies	1–4	Freeland (5–7)	**Peralta** (10–8)	Kinley (11)	42,015	82–61	L1
144	September 10	@ Giants	3–2	**Civale** (6–8)	Roupp (0–1)	**Williams** (10)	25,096	83–61	W1
145	September 11	@ Giants	2–13	Snell (3–3)	**Rea** (12–5)	—	22,042	83–62	L1
146	September 12	@ Giants	3–0	**Montas** (7–10)	Doval (5–2)	**Williams** (11)	22,184	84–62	W1
147	September 13	@ Diamondbacks	2–1	**Peralta** (11–8)	Rodríguez (2–3)	**Williams** (12)	31,033	85–62	W2
148	September 14	@ Diamondbacks	15–8	**Myers** (8–5)	Pfaadt (9–9)	—	44,886	86–62	W3
149	September 15	@ Diamondbacks	10–11 (10)	Walston (1–0)	**Koenig** (8–4)	—	33,708	86–63	L1
150	September 16	Phillies	6–2	**Civale** (7–8)	Suárez (12–7)	**Rea** (1)	28,713	87–63	W1
151	September 17	Phillies	1–5	Wheeler (16–6)	**Montas** (7–11)	—	30,059	87–64	L1
152	September 18	Phillies	2–1	**Wlliams** (8–8)	Estévez (12–8)	—	30,048	88–64	W1
153	September 19	Diamondbacks	1–5	Pfaadt (10–9)	**Myers** (8–6)	—	25,093	88–65	L1
154	September 20	Diamondbacks	4–7	Gallen (13–6)	**Hall** (1–2)	Puk (3)	32,123	88–66	L2
155	September 21	Diamondbacks	0–5	Kelly (5–0)	**Civale** (7–9)	—	35,068	88–67	L3
156	September 22	Diamondbacks	10–9	**Koenig** (9–4)	Martínez (5–6)	**Williams** (13)	37,612	89–67	W1
157	September 24	@ Pirates	7–2	**Milner** (5–1)	Falter (8–9)	—	14,020	90–67	W2
158	September 25	@ Pirates	1–2	Ortiz (7–6)	**Peralta** (11–9)	Chapman (12)	15,965	90–68	L1
159	September 26	@ Pirates	5–2	**Civale** (8–9)	Keller (11–12)	**Williams** (14)	16,797	91–68	W1
160	September 27	Mets	8–4	**Ross** (3–6)	Manaea (12–6)	**Megill** (21)	33,996	92–68	W2
161	September 28	Mets	6–0	**Myers** (9–6)	Quintana (10–10)	—	39,637	93–68	W3
162	September 29	Mets	0–5	Peterson (10–3)	**Rea** (12–6)	—	33,754	93–69	L1

Legend: = Win = Loss = Postponement
Bold = Brewers team member

== Postseason ==
=== Game log ===
2024 Postseason game log: 1–2 (Home: 1–2; Away: 0–0)
NL Wild Card Series: 1–2 (Home: 1–2; Away: 0–0)

#	Date	Opponent	Score	Win	Loss	Save	Attendance	Record	Box/ Streak
1	October 1	Mets	4–8	Severino (1–0)	Payamps (0–1)	—	40,022	0–1	L1
2	October 2	Mets	5–3	Ross (1–0)	Maton (0–1)	Williams (1)	40,350	1–1	W1
3	October 3	Mets	2–4	Díaz (1–0)	Williams (0–1)	Peterson (1)	41,594	1–2	L1

=== Postseason rosters ===
Playoff rosters
National League Wild Card Series

- Pitchers: 25 Nick Mears 26 Aaron Ashby 29 Trevor Megill 31 Joel Payamps 32 Aaron Civale 35 Jared Koenig 36 Tobias Myers 37 DL Hall 38 Devin Williams 41 Joe Ross 47 Frankie Montas 51 Freddy Peralta
- Catchers: 13 Eric Haase 24 William Contreras 99 Gary Sánchez
- Infielders: 2 Brice Turang 3 Joey Ortiz 9 Jake Bauers 12 Rhys Hoskins 14 Andruw Monasterio 27 Willy Adames
- Outfielders: 5 Garrett Mitchell 6 Isaac Collins 10 Sal Frelick 11 Jackson Chourio 16 Blake Perkins

== Farm system ==
The Brewers' farm system consisted of seven minor league affiliates in 2024.

Level	Team	League	Manager
Triple-A	Nashville Sounds	International League	Rick Sweet
Double-A	Biloxi Shuckers	Southern League	Joe Ayrault
High-A	Wisconsin Timber Rattlers	Midwest League	Victor Estevez
Single-A	Carolina Mudcats	Carolina League	Nick Stanley
Rookie	ACL Brewers	Arizona Complex League	Rafael Neda
Rookie	DSL Brewers 1	Dominican Summer League	Victor Rey
Rookie	DSL Brewers 2	Dominican Summer League	Natanael Mejia
