= Adam Seminaris =

American baseball player (born 1998)

Free agent
- Pitcher
- Born: October 19, 1998 (age 28); Pomona, California, U.S.
- Bats: Right Throws: Left

Adam Joseph Seminaris (born October 19, 1998) is an American professional baseball pitcher who is a free agent.

== Amateur career ==
Seminaris attended Ruben S. Ayala High School in Chino Hills, California, and played three years of college baseball at Long Beach State University. In 2019, he played collegiate summer baseball with the Orleans Firebirds of the Cape Cod Baseball League. Seminaris posted a 1.23 ERA over four games in 2020 for Long Beach before the season was cancelled due to the COVID-19 pandemic.

== Professional career ==
=== Los Angeles Angels ===
Seminaris was drafted by the Los Angeles Angels in the fifth round, with the 141st overall selection, of the 2020 Major League Baseball draft. Seminaris signed for $140,000, nearly $250,000 under the assigned slot value. He did not play in a game in 2020 due to the cancellation of the minor league season because of the COVID-19 pandemic.

Seminaris made his professional debut in 2021 with the Single–A Inland Empire 66ers before he was promoted to the High–A Tri-City Dust Devils. Over 20 games (18 starts) between the two clubs, he went 6–5 with a 4.86 ERA and 112 strikeouts over 83 1/3 innings pitched. Seminaris opened the 2022 season back with Tri-City, was promoted to the Double–A Rocket City Trash Pandas in early June, and was promoted once again to the Triple–A Salt Lake Bees in early August. Over 24 games (21 starts) between the three affiliates, he went 7-11 with a 3.54 ERA and 97 strikeouts over 101 2/3 innings.

=== Milwaukee Brewers ===
On November 22, 2022, the Angels traded Seminaris, Janson Junk, and Elvis Peguero to the Milwaukee Brewers in exchange for Hunter Renfroe. He opened the 2023 season with the Double–A Biloxi Shuckers and was promoted to the Triple–A Nashville Sounds near the season's end. Over 16 starts, Seminaris went 2–6 with a 5.95 ERA and 64 strikeouts over 62 innings. He was selected to play in the Arizona Fall League with the Surprise Saguaros.

Seminaris made 25 appearances (10 starts) for Double–A Biloxi in 2024, compiling a 1–8 record and 6.15 ERA with 73 strikeouts across 74 2/3 innings pitched. Seminaris was released by the Brewers organization on October 8, 2024.

=== Seattle Mariners ===
On January 29, 2025, Seminaris signed a minor league contract with the Seattle Mariners. He was assigned to the Double-A Arkansas Travelers to open the 2025 season. In 24 appearances (22 starts) for the Travelers, Seminaris pitched to a 7–7 record and 3.02 ERA with 105 strikeouts across 125 1/3 innings pitched. He elected free agency following the season on November 6.

=== Philadelphia Phillies ===
On November 18, 2025, Seminaris signed a minor league contract with the Philadelphia Phillies. He played the 2026 season with the Double-A Reading Fightin Phils and made 26 starts in which he had an 11–9 record, a 4.03 ERA, and 162 strikeouts across 138 1/3 innings pitched. His 162 strikeouts were tied for second most in the minor leagues. He elected free agency on November 2.
