= Hunter Renfroe =

American baseball player (born 1992)

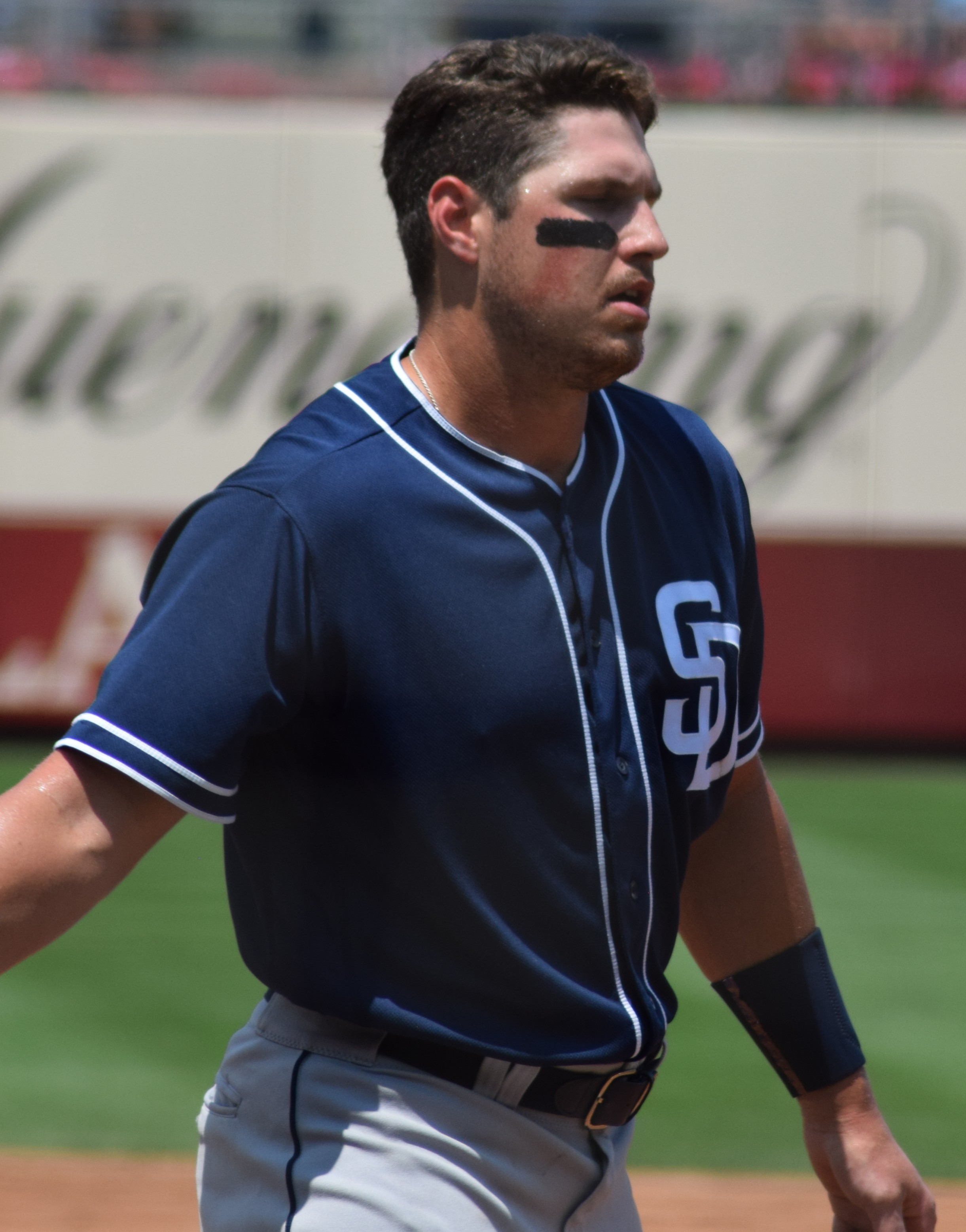
- Renfroe with the San Diego Padres in 2018

Free agent
- Right fielder
- Born: January 28, 1992 (age 34); Crystal Springs, Mississippi, U.S.
- Bats: Right Throws: Right

MLB debut
- September 21, 2016, for the San Diego Padres

MLB statistics (through 2025 season)
- Batting average: .236
- Home runs: 192
- Runs batted in: 510
- Stats at Baseball Reference

Teams
- San Diego Padres (2016–2019); Tampa Bay Rays (2020); Boston Red Sox (2021); Milwaukee Brewers (2022); Los Angeles Angels (2023); Cincinnati Reds (2023); Kansas City Royals (2024–2025)

Dustin Hunter Renfroe (born January 28, 1992) is an American professional baseball right fielder who is a free agent. He has previously played in Major League Baseball (MLB) for the San Diego Padres, Tampa Bay Rays, Boston Red Sox, Milwaukee Brewers, Los Angeles Angels, Cincinnati Reds, and Kansas City Royals.

Renfroe received a scholarship to Mississippi State University, where he played college baseball for the Mississippi State Bulldogs. The Padres selected Renfroe in the first round of the 2013 MLB draft. He made his MLB debut in 2016, was traded to the Rays before the 2020 season, signed with the Red Sox before the 2021 season, was traded to the Brewers after the 2021 season and was then traded to the Angels after the 2022 season. He was claimed by the Reds from the Angels on waivers. He was released by the Reds after the 2023 season. He was then acquired by the Royals prior to the start of the 2024 season.

== Early life ==
Hunter Renfroe was born and raised in Crystal Springs, Mississippi, to parents Todd and Tammy. He attended Copiah Academy in Gallman, Mississippi, where he played for the school's baseball team.

== Career ==
=== Amateur career ===
The Boston Red Sox selected Renfroe in the 31st round of the 2010 Major League Baseball (MLB) draft, but he did not sign. He enrolled at Mississippi State University, where he played college baseball for the Mississippi State Bulldogs. On April 15, 2013, he was named the Southeastern Conference Player of the Week. He was also named to the Golden Spikes Award watchlist and was the 2013 recipient of the C Spire Ferriss Trophy, given to the best college baseball player in Mississippi. From 2011 to 2012, Renfroe played for the Bethesda Big Train of the Cal Ripken Collegiate Baseball League, where he broke the Big Train record for most runs, home runs, runs batted in, slugging percentage, and total bases in a season in 2012. Renfroe's number 11 was retired by the Big Train in 2012.

=== San Diego Padres ===
Renfroe was considered among the best prospects available in the 2013 MLB draft. The San Diego Padres selected Renfroe in the first round, with the 13th overall selection. Renfroe agreed to a $2.678 million signing bonus and began his professional career with the Eugene Emeralds of the Class A-Short Season Northwest League. After participating in the Northwest League's all-star game and registering the game-winning hit, the Padres promoted him to the Fort Wayne TinCaps of the Class A Midwest League in August.

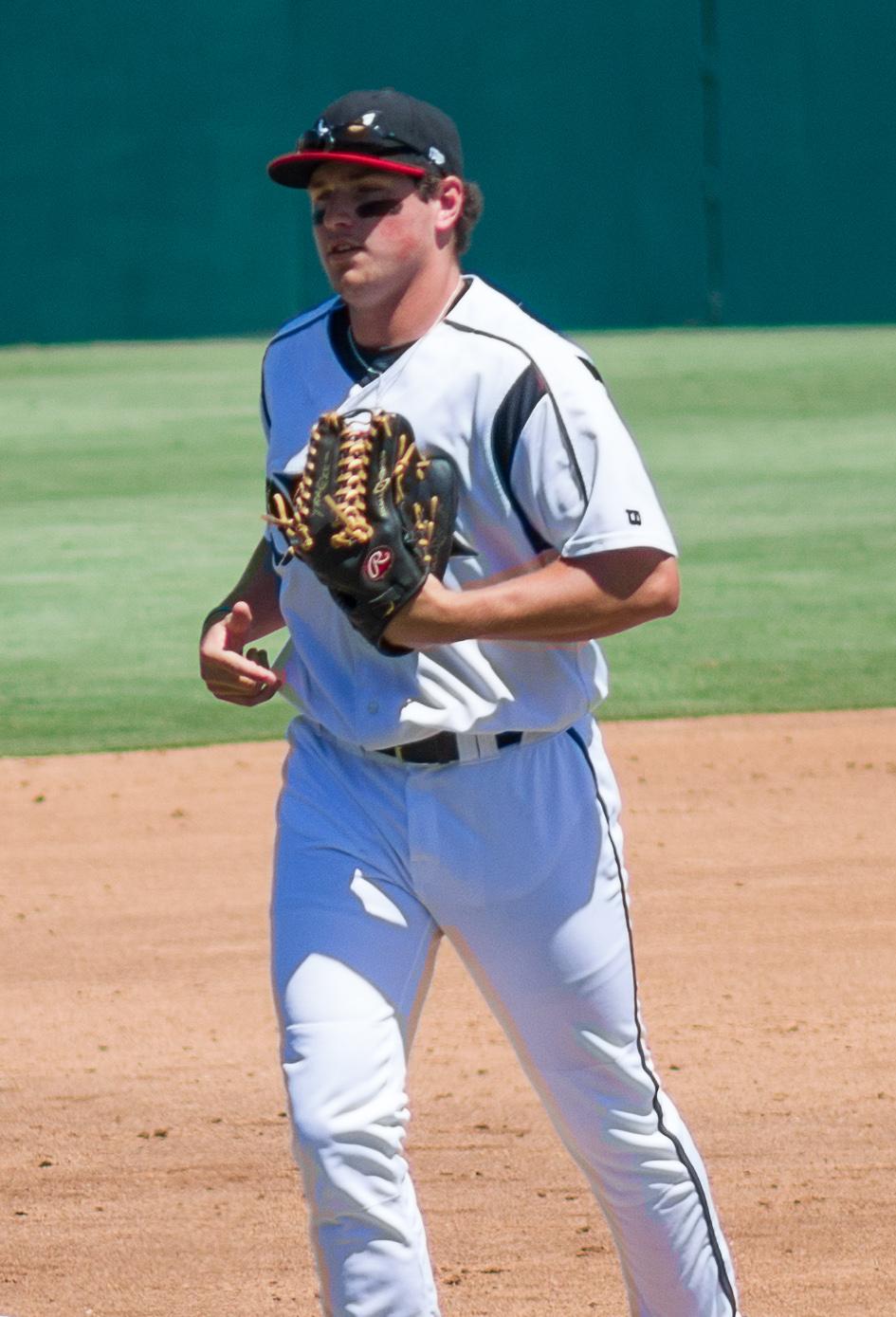
Renfroe with the Lake Elsinore Storm in 2014

Renfroe began the 2014 season with the Lake Elsinore Storm of the Class A-Advanced California League. In 69 games for Lake Elsinore, Renfroe had a .295 batting average, 16 home runs, and 52 runs batted in (RBIs). He was promoted to the San Antonio Missions of the Class AA Texas League during the season. Renfroe played in the 2014 All-Star Futures Game. After the season, the Padres assigned Renfroe to the Arizona Fall League to continue his development. Renfroe began the 2015 season with San Antonio and received a promotion in August to the El Paso Chihuahuas of the Class AAA Pacific Coast League. He played in 21 games for El Paso. For the season, Renfroe had a .272 average with 20 home runs and 78 RBIs, including a .333 average and six home runs with 24 RBIs with El Paso.

The Padres invited Renfroe to spring training in 2016. He opened the 2016 season with El Paso. He won the 2016 Pacific Coast League Most Valuable Player Award. Following the 2016 Triple-A Baseball National Championship Game, the Padres promoted Renfroe to the major leagues on September 21. He made his first plate appearance as a pinch hitter that same night, getting intentionally walked by Arizona Diamondbacks reliever Edwin Escobar. He batted .371 in 11 games for San Diego.

Renfroe made the Padres' Opening Day roster in 2017 as the starting right fielder. On August 19, Renfroe was optioned to El Paso due to his declining performance in reaching base. He was recalled to the majors on September 18 after the end of the Triple-A season. Renfroe finished the 2017 season with a batting line of .231/.284/.467 and 26 home runs with 117 starts in right field. Renfroe began the 2018 season primarily starting only against left-handed pitching, but picked up more starts after Wil Myers got injured. He led the Padres in home runs in 2018 with 26.

=== Tampa Bay Rays ===
On December 6, 2019, Renfroe, Xavier Edwards, and a player to be named later (PTBNL) were traded to the Tampa Bay Rays in exchange for Tommy Pham and Jake Cronenworth. The PTBNL, Esteban Quiroz, was named in March 2020. In a shortened 2020 season, Renfroe slashed .156/.252/.393 with eight home runs and 22 RBIs over 42 games. On November 20, 2020, Renfroe was designated for assignment. On November 25, 2020, Renfroe became a free agent.

=== Boston Red Sox ===
On December 14, 2020, Renfroe signed a one-year, $3.1 million contract with the Boston Red Sox. He began the season as a regular member of Boston's outfield. Renfroe was placed on the bereavement list on August 26, due to the death of his father. He returned to the Red Sox on August 31. For the season, Renfroe played in 144 games while batting .259 with 31 home runs and 96 RBIs. He also played in 11 postseason games, batting 7-for-36 (.194) as the Red Sox advanced to the American League Championship Series.

=== Milwaukee Brewers ===
On December 1, 2021, the Red Sox traded Renfroe to the Milwaukee Brewers in exchange for Jackie Bradley Jr., David Hamilton, and Alex Binelas. During the 2022 season, Renfroe slashed .255/.315/.492 with 29 home runs and 72 RBI's on 522 plate appearances in his one season in Milwaukee.

=== Los Angeles Angels ===
On November 22, 2022, the Brewers traded Renfroe to the Los Angeles Angels for Janson Junk, Elvis Peguero, and Adam Seminaris. On February 18, 2023, Renfroe won his salary arbitration case against the Angels, making his salary $11.9 million for the season rather than the team offer of $11.25 million. In 126 games for the Angels, he batted .242/.304/.434 with 19 home runs and 56 RBI. On August 29, Renfroe was placed on waivers by the Angels.

=== Cincinnati Reds ===
On August 31, 2023, Renfroe was claimed off waivers by the Cincinnati Reds. He was designated for assignment by the Reds on September 18 after posting a slash line of .128/.227/.205 in 14 games. Renfroe was released by Cincinnati on September 21.

=== Kansas City Royals ===
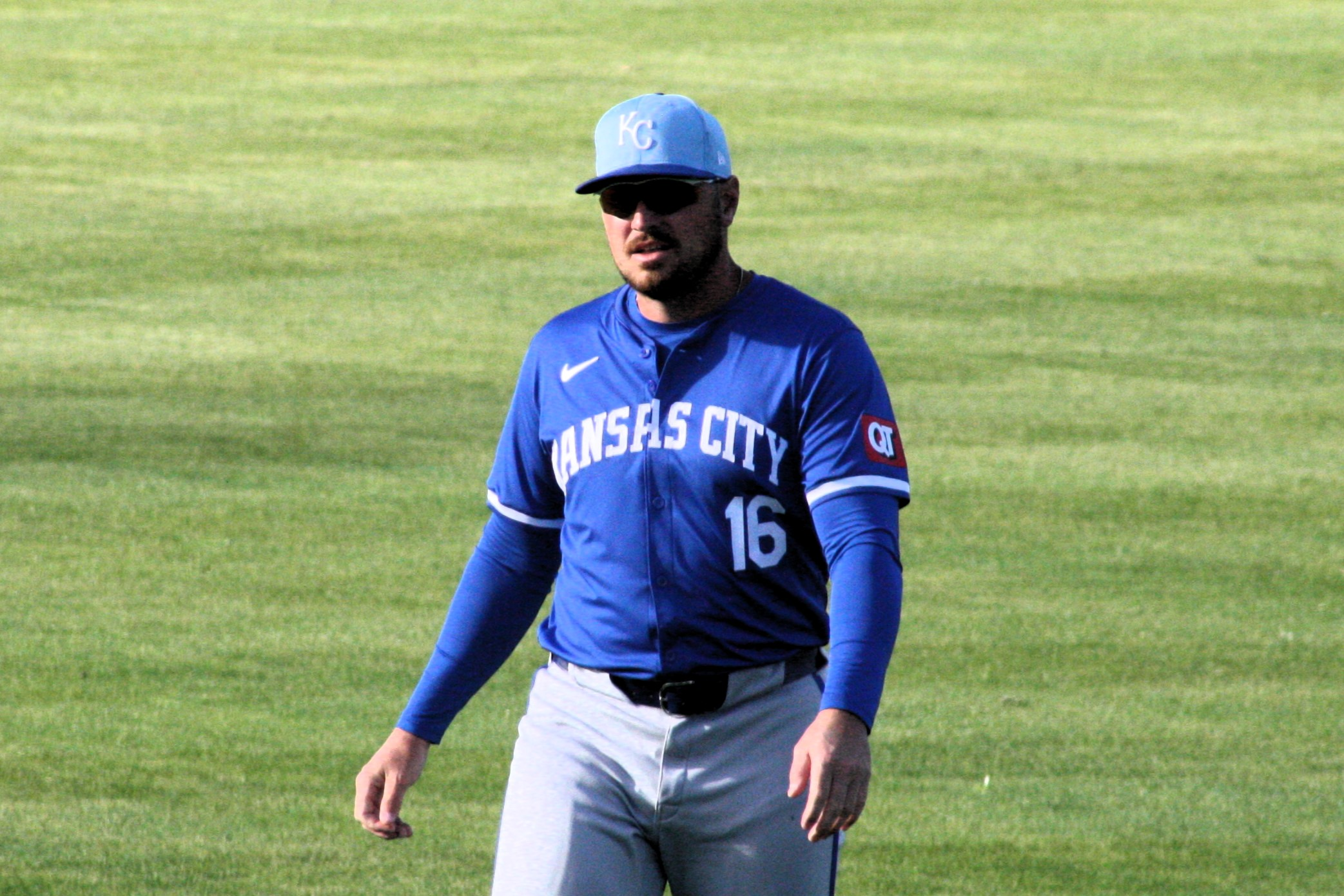
Renfroe in 2024

On December 15, 2023, Renfroe signed a one-year $5.5 million contract with the Kansas City Royals, which also included a $7.5 million player option for the 2025 season.

Renfroe had an up-and-down 2024 campaign with the Royals. On June 11, 2024, he was placed on the 10-day injured list with a broken left big toe after fouling a ball of his foot, and was later reinstated on June 21. He was later added back to the IL on August 25 due to a right hamstring strain, before getting activated on September 5 for the team's playoff push. Renfroe made 120 total appearances for Kansas City during the season, slashing .229/.297/.392 with 15 home runs and 52 RBI. On October 31, he triggered a player option for 2025 with the Royals.

Renfroe made 35 appearances for Kansas City in 2025, but posted a .182/.241/.242 batting line with four RBI and eight walks. On May 23, 2025, Renfroe was designated for assignment by the Royals. He was released by Kansas City on May 28.

== Personal life ==
Renfroe married Courtney Beach on December 5, 2015, in their hometown of Crystal Springs. Renfroe is a Christian.
