= Joel Payamps =

Dominican baseball player (born 1994)

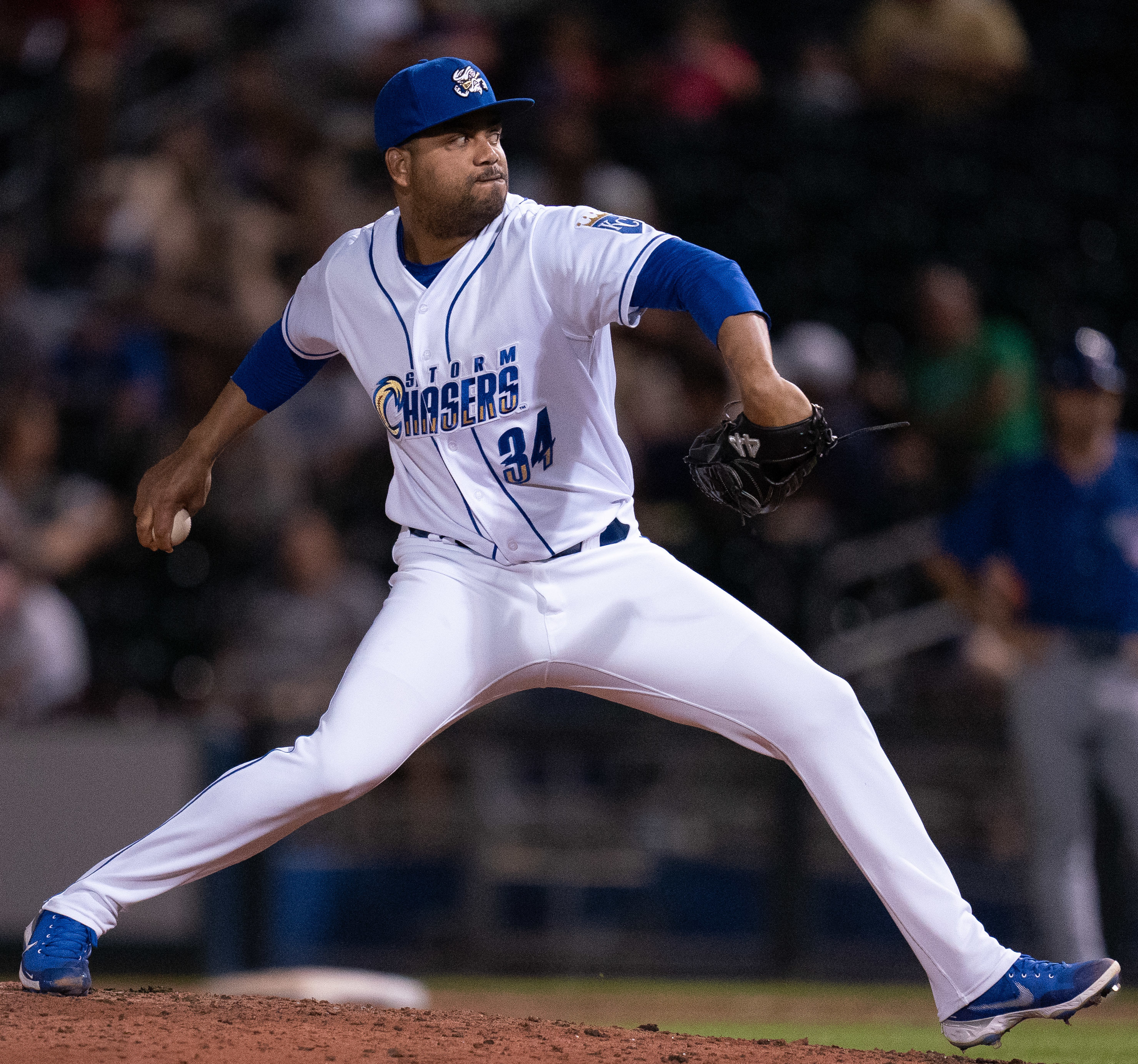
- Payamps with the Omaha Storm Chasers in 2021

Free agent
- Pitcher
- Born: April 7, 1994 (age 32); Santiago, Dominican Republic
- Bats: Right Throws: Right

MLB debut
- August 21, 2019, for the Arizona Diamondbacks

MLB statistics (through 2026 season)
- Win–loss record: 14–24
- Earned run average: 3.55
- Strikeouts: 253
- Stats at Baseball Reference

Teams
- Arizona Diamondbacks (2019–2020); Toronto Blue Jays (2021); Kansas City Royals (2021–2022); Oakland Athletics (2022); Milwaukee Brewers (2023–2025); Atlanta Braves (2025–2026)

Joel Elias Payamps (born April 7, 1994) is a Dominican professional baseball pitcher who is a free agent. He has previously played in Major League Baseball (MLB) for the Arizona Diamondbacks, Toronto Blue Jays, Kansas City Royals, Oakland Athletics, Milwaukee Brewers, and Atlanta Braves.

== Career ==
=== Colorado Rockies ===
Payamps signed with the Colorado Rockies as an international free agent on May 1, 2011. He spent his first two seasons with the Dominican Summer League Rockies, going 1–3 with a 3.29 ERA and 38 strikeouts in 38 innings in 2011, and going 1–2 with a 3.02 ERA and 38 strikeouts in 59 2/3 innings in 2012. Payamps spent 2013 with the rookie-level Grand Junction Rockies, going 4–7 with a 6.06 ERA and 63 strikeouts across 68 innings of work. He played for the Tri-City Dust Devils in 2014, going 0–2 with a 6.10 ERA and 22 strikeouts over 20 2/3 innings pitched.

On May 6, 2015, Payamps was released by the Rockies organization, and did not appear in any professional games during the season.

=== Arizona Diamondbacks ===
Payamps signed a minor league contract with the Arizona Diamondbacks on November 30, 2015. He returned in 2016 and split the season between the Single-A Kane County Cougars and High-A Visalia Rawhide, going a combined 10–8 with a 3.86 ERA and 128 strikeouts across 132 1/3 innings pitched. Payamps' 2017 season was split between Visalia, the Double-A Jackson Generals, and Triple-A Reno Aces, going a combined 11–7 with a 4.30 ERA and 96 strikeouts over 150 2/3 innings. He split the 2018 season between Jackson and Reno, going a combined 9–8 with a 3.87 ERA and 122 strikeouts over 116 innings. On November 20, 2018, the Diamondbacks added Payamps to their 40-man roster to protect him from the Rule 5 draft.

Payamps opened the 2019 season back with Reno. He suffered a broken foot on April 6 when he was hit by a batted ball. He finished the 2019 minor league season posting a combined 5–6 record with a 3.89 ERA and 69 strikeouts over 78 2/3 innings between Jackson and Reno.

On August 17, 2019, the Diamondbacks promoted Payamps to the major leagues for the first time. He made his major league debut on August 21 versus the Colorado Rockies, allowing two runs over three innings pitched. Payamps made two appearances for the Diamondbacks during his rookie campaign, striking out three batters in four innings pitched while allowing two earned runs. In 2020, he again appeared in two games with the Diamondbacks, striking out two batters in three innings, while allowing one earned run. Overall with Arizona, Payamps appeared in four MLB games, pitching to a 3.86 ERA in four appearances without a decision. On November 20, 2020, Payamps was designated for assignment by the Diamondbacks.

=== Toronto Blue Jays ===
On November 25, 2020, Payamps was claimed off waivers by the Boston Red Sox. On February 3, 2021, he was designated for assignment after the signing of Garrett Richards was made official. On February 10, Payamps was claimed off waivers by the Toronto Blue Jays. On February 22, he was again claimed off waivers by the Red Sox. On March 6, Payamps was again claimed off waivers by the Blue Jays. Payamps recorded a 2.70 ERA in 22 appearances with the Blue Jays, but was designated for assignment on July 16.

=== Kansas City Royals ===
On July 21, 2021, Payamps was traded to the Kansas City Royals in exchange for cash considerations. He appeared in 15 games (1 start) down the stretch for the Royals, posting a 1–1 with a 4.43 ERA over 20 1/3 innings. He would make the Opening Day roster going into 2022 and would go onto make 29 appearances for Kansas City, he posted a 2-3 record and 3.16 ERA with 33 strikeouts across 42 2/3 innings pitched. Payamps was designated for assignment by the Royals on August 18.

=== Oakland Athletics ===
On August 20, 2022, Payamps was claimed off waivers by the Oakland Athletics. In 12 appearances for Oakland, Payamps logged a 1–3 record and 3.46 ERA with eight strikeouts over 13 innings pitched.

=== Milwaukee Brewers ===
On December 12, 2022, the Athletics sent Payamps to the Milwaukee Brewers in a three-team trade in which the Atlanta Braves acquired Sean Murphy, the Brewers also acquired William Contreras and Justin Yeager, and the Athletics acquired Manny Piña, Esteury Ruiz, Kyle Muller, Freddy Tarnok, and Royber Salinas.

On April 13, 2023, Payamps recorded his first major league save in an extra innings win over the San Diego Padres at Petco Park. He made 69 appearances for Milwaukee during the season, compiling a 7-5 record and 2.55 ERA with 77 strikeouts and three saves across 70 2/3 innings pitched. In 2024, Payamps made 68 appearances out of the bullpen for the Brewers, registering a 3-7 record and 3.05 ERA with 59 strikeouts and six saves over 59 innings of work.

Payamps made 23 appearances for the Brewers in 2025, but struggled to an 8.35 ERA with 16 strikeouts across 18 1/3 innings pitched. Payamps was designated for assignment by Milwaukee on May 22, 2025. He cleared waivers and was sent outright to the Triple-A Nashville Sounds on May 29. On September 3, the Brewers selected Payamps' contract, adding him back to their active roster. He allowed two runs in 5 1/3 innings across five appearances and was designated for assignment by Milwaukee on September 20.

=== Atlanta Braves ===
On September 22, 2025, Payamps was claimed off waivers by the Atlanta Braves. He made two appearances for Atlanta, recording a 3.38 ERA with two strikeouts across 2 2/3 innings pitched. On November 6, Payamps was removed from the 40-man roster and sent outright to the Triple-A Gwinnett Stripers. He elected free agency the same day.

On November 23, 2025, Payamps re-signed with the Braves on a one-year, $2.25 million contract. In 12 appearances for Atlanta, he struggled to a 8.22 ERA with nine strikeouts across 7 2/3 innings pitched. On May 1, 2026, Payamps was designated for assignment by the Braves. He cleared waivers and was sent outright to Triple–A Gwinnett on May 3. He elected free agency on October 13.
