= Carlos Rodríguez (pitcher, born 2001) =

Nicaraguan baseball player (born 2001)

Milwaukee Brewers
- Pitcher
- Born: November 27, 2001 (age 24); Rivas, Nicaragua
- Bats: Right Throws: Right

MLB debut
- June 11, 2024, for the Milwaukee Brewers

MLB statistics (through 2026 season)
- Win–loss record: 1–3
- Earned run average: 6.03
- Strikeouts: 28
- Stats at Baseball Reference

Teams
- Milwaukee Brewers (2024–2026)

Carlos Fernando Rodríguez (born November 27, 2001) is a Nicaraguan professional baseball pitcher in the Milwaukee Brewers organization. He made his Major League Baseball (MLB) debut in 2024.

== Professional career ==
Rodríguez was born in Nicaragua and moved to Miami, Florida at eight years old. He graduated from Miami Christian School in Fontainebleau, Florida in 2020. He was not selected in the 2020 Major League Baseball draft and enrolled at Florida SouthWestern State College.

The Milwaukee Brewers drafted Rodríguez in the sixth round, with the 177th overall selection, of the 2021 Major League Baseball draft. Rodríguez made his professional debut in 2022, splitting the year between the Single–A Carolina Mudcats and High–A Wisconsin Timber Rattlers. In 26 games (20 starts) between the two affiliates, he accumulated a 6–5 record and 3.01 ERA with 129 strikeouts across 107 2/3 innings pitched.

Rodríguez won the 2023 Southern League Pitcher of the Year Award with the Double-A Biloxi Shuckers, after logging a 9–6 record and 2.77 ERA with 152 strikeouts over 25 starts.

Rodríguez began the 2024 season with the Triple–A Nashville Sounds, compiling a 4–5 win–loss record and 5.17 earned run average (ERA) with 66 strikeouts across 12 games played (11 games started). On June 11, 2024, Rodríguez was selected to the 40-man roster and promoted to the major leagues for the first time. In 3 starts for Milwaukee during his rookie campaign, Rodríguez struggled to an 0-3 record and 7.30 ERA with 9 strikeouts across 12 1/3 innings pitched.

Rodríguez was optioned to Triple-A Nashville to begin the 2025 season. On May 22, 2025, Rodríguez earned his first career win after allowing three runs in 3 1/3 innings of relief against the Pittsburgh Pirates. He made four appearances for Milwaukee during the regular season, registering a 1-0 record and 6.52 ERA with 11 strikeouts across 9 2/3 innings pitched.

Rodríguez was optioned to Triple-A Nashville to begin the 2026 season. He cleared waivers and was sent outright back to Nashville on August 6. In 23 games (12 starts) between Triple-A and Rookie ball he threw 53.2 innings going 0-8 with an 8.89 ERA with 52 strikeouts and one save.

== International career ==
Rodríguez played for the Nicaraguan national baseball team in the 2023 World Baseball Classic (WBC). He started the team's first WBC game,. In his sole appearance, he pitched four innings of one-run ball against Puerto Rico, working to a 2.25 ERA.
