= Jared Koenig =

American baseball player (born 1994)

Free agent
- Pitcher
- Born: January 24, 1994 (age 32); San Jose, California, U.S.
- Bats: Right Throws: Left

MLB debut
- June 8, 2022, for the Oakland Athletics

MLB statistics (through 2026 season)
- Win–loss record: 16–8
- Earned run average: 3.61
- Strikeouts: 160
- Stats at Baseball Reference

Teams
- Oakland Athletics (2022); Milwaukee Brewers (2024–2026)

Jared Tyler Koenig (born January 24, 1994) is an American professional baseball pitcher who is a free agent. He has previously played in Major League Baseball (MLB) for the Oakland Athletics and Milwaukee Brewers.

== Amateur career ==
Koenig grew up in Aptos, California, and attended Aptos High School.

Koenig began his college baseball career at Central Arizona College. He was selected in the 35th round of the 2014 Major League Baseball draft by the Chicago White Sox, but was not offered a contract by the team along with other late-round picks after signing first rounder Carlos Rodón to an above-slot signing bonus. After his sophomore season Koenig transferred to Old Dominion University. Koenig pitched for the Old Dominion Monarchs baseball team for one season before transferring to California State University, Monterey Bay to pitch for the Cal State Monterey Bay Otters for his senior season.

== Professional career ==
=== Independent leagues ===
After going unselected in the 2016 Major League Baseball draft, Koenig signed Monterey Amberjacks of the independent Pecos League prior to the start of the 2017 season. He later pitched for Salina Stockade, then a traveling team in the American Association of Professional Baseball. He was then a member of the San Rafael Pacifics of the Pacific Association. Koenig also played for the Birmingham Bloomfield Beavers of the United Shore Professional Baseball League during the 2017 season.

Koenig returned to San Rafael in 2018 and was named the Pacific Association Pitcher of the Year after posting a 11–1 record with 3.54 ERA and 140 strikeouts in 16 starts. Koenig pitched for the Lake Erie Crushers of the Frontier League in 2019 and went 7–2 with a 2.24 ERA and 133 strikeouts in 104 1/3 innings pitched. Following the season, he signed to play for the Auckland Tuatara in the Australian Baseball League. While pitching for Auckland Koenig was noticed by Dan Betreen, an international scout for the Oakland Athletics.

=== Oakland Athletics ===
Koenig signed a minor league contract with the Oakland Athletics on December 21, 2019. He did not play in 2020 due to the cancellation of the Minor League Baseball season because of the COVID-19 pandemic. Koenig trained with his younger brother, a player at Cabrillo College, until taking part in Oakland's fall instructional league. He spent the 2021 season with the Double-A Midland RockHounds and was named the Double-A Central Pitcher of the Year after going 7–5 with a 3.26 ERA and 100 strikeouts in 121 1/3 innings pitched. Koenig was assigned to the Triple-A Las Vegas Aviators at the start of the 2022 season.

On June 8, Koenig was selected to the 40-man roster and promoted to the major leagues for the first time. That same day, Koenig would make his Major League Baseball debut vs. the Atlanta Braves. In the second inning, he earned his first MLB strikeout on William Contreras. Despite Koenig's four innings of one-run ball, the defending 2021 World Series champions rallied in the fifth, giving Koenig the loss.

Koenig’s third career start for the Oakland Athletics came on June 19, vs the Kansas City Royals where he would pitch 5 2/3 innings of scoreless ball, earning him his first MLB win. Koenig finished his rookie campaign appearing in 10 games (5 starts), pitching to a 1-3 record and 5.72 ERA with 22 strikeouts in 39.1 innings of work. He was non-tendered and became a free agent on November 18, 2022.

=== San Diego Padres ===
On February 23, 2023, Koenig signed a minor league contract with the San Diego Padres organization. In 48 appearances split between the Double-A San Antonio Missions and Triple-A El Paso Chihuahuas, he pitched to a cumulative 3.81 ERA with 70 strikeouts and 7 saves in 59 innings of work. Koenig elected free agency following the season on November 6.

=== Milwaukee Brewers ===
On November 17, 2023, Koenig signed a minor league contract with the Milwaukee Brewers. He began the season with the Triple–A Nashville Sounds. On April 14, 2024, the Brewers selected Koenig's contract to the active roster. The following day, Koenig made his Milwaukee debut against the San Diego Padres where he threw two scoreless innings and earned his first Brewers strikeout against Fernando Tatis Jr. Koenig became the 1,000th player to appear in at least one game in a Brewers uniform. On May 25, Koenig became the first Brewers pitcher since Zack Greinke to start two consecutive games. He made 55 total appearances for Milwaukee, posting a 9–4 record and 2.47 ERA with 63 strikeouts and one save over 62 innings of work.

Koenig made 72 appearances out of the bullpen for the Brewers during the 2025 campaign, compiling a 6–1 record and 2.86 ERA with 68 strikeouts and two saves across 66 innings pitched.

On April 6, 2026, Koenig was placed on the injured list due to a left UCL sprain. He made nine total appearances for Milwaukee, struggling to a 9.00 ERA with seven strikeouts across seven innings pitched. On November 2, Koenig was removed from the 40–man roster and sent outright to Triple–A Nashville, after which he elected free agency.
