= Janson Junk =

American baseball player (born 1996)

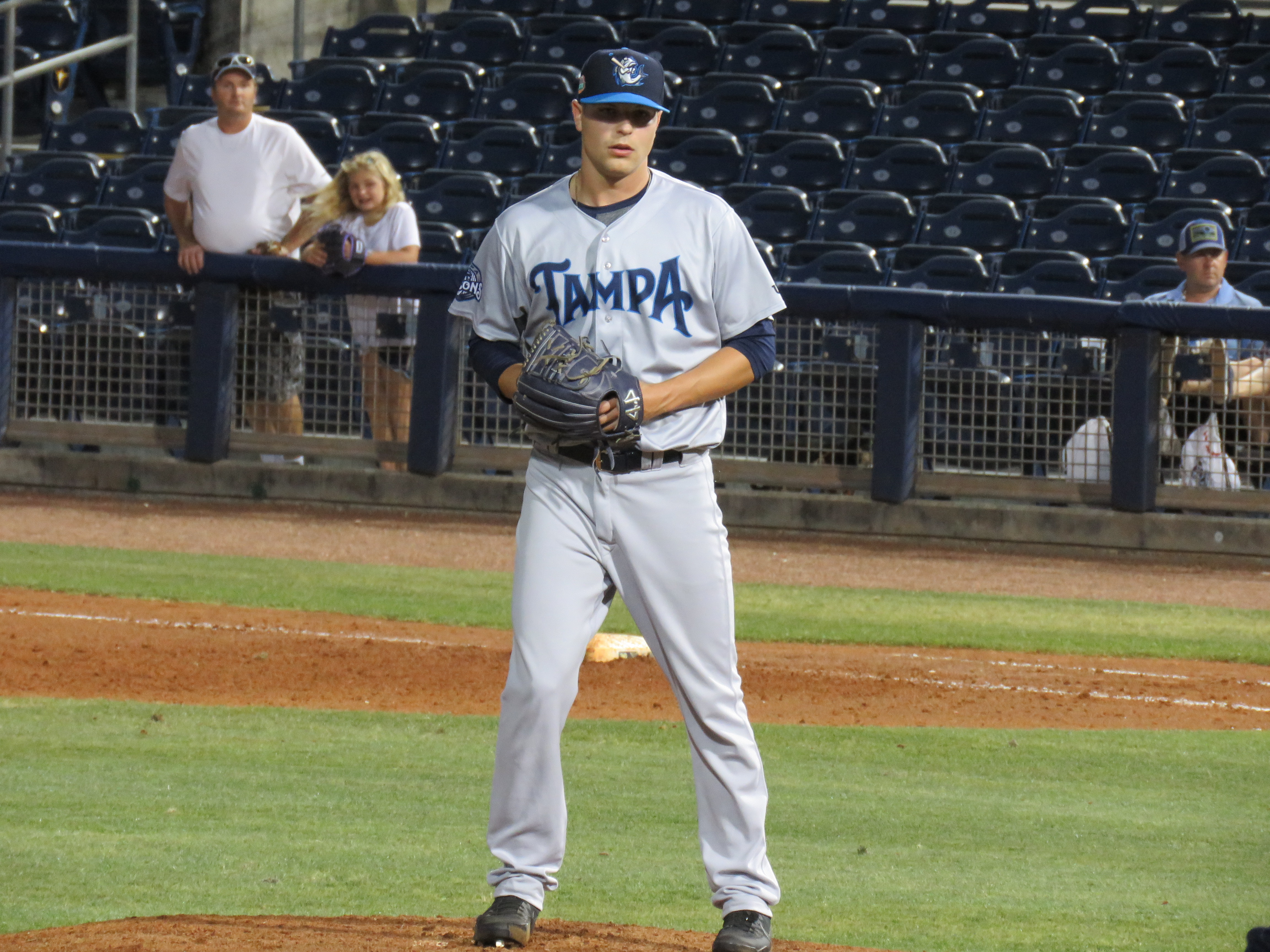
- Junk with the Tampa Tarpons in 2019

Miami Marlins – No. 26
- Pitcher
- Born: January 15, 1996 (age 30); Federal Way, Washington, U.S.
- Bats: Right Throws: Right

MLB debut
- September 5, 2021, for the Los Angeles Angels

MLB statistics (through 2026 season)
- Win–loss record: 13–16
- Earned run average: 4.57
- Strikeouts: 200
- Stats at Baseball Reference

Teams
- Los Angeles Angels (2021–2022); Milwaukee Brewers (2023–2024); Oakland Athletics (2024); Miami Marlins (2025–present)

Janson Randall Junk (born January 15, 1996) is an American professional baseball pitcher for the Miami Marlins of Major League Baseball (MLB). He has previously played in MLB for the Los Angeles Angels, Milwaukee Brewers, and Oakland Athletics.

== Amateur career ==
Junk grew up in Federal Way, Washington, and attended Decatur High School. He played college baseball at Seattle University, spending three seasons (2015–2017) with the Redhawks after joining the team as a walk-on. During the summer of 2015, Junk played collegiate summer baseball with the Bend Elks of the West Coast League.

== Professional career ==
=== New York Yankees ===
Junk was selected in the 22nd round, with the 662nd overall pick, of the 2017 Major League Baseball draft by the New York Yankees.

Junk spent the 2018 season with the Single–A Charleston RiverDogs, where he had a 7–5 win–loss record with a 3.77 earned run average (ERA) over 17 appearances. He spent most of the 2019 season with the High–A Tampa Tarpons of the Florida State League, while also making one start each for the Double–A Trenton Thunder and the Triple-A Scranton/Wilkes-Barre RailRiders.

Junk did not play in a game in 2020 due to the cancellation of the minor league season because of the COVID-19 pandemic. Junk began the 2021 season with the Yankees' new Double–A affiliate, the Somerset Patriots.

=== Los Angeles Angels ===
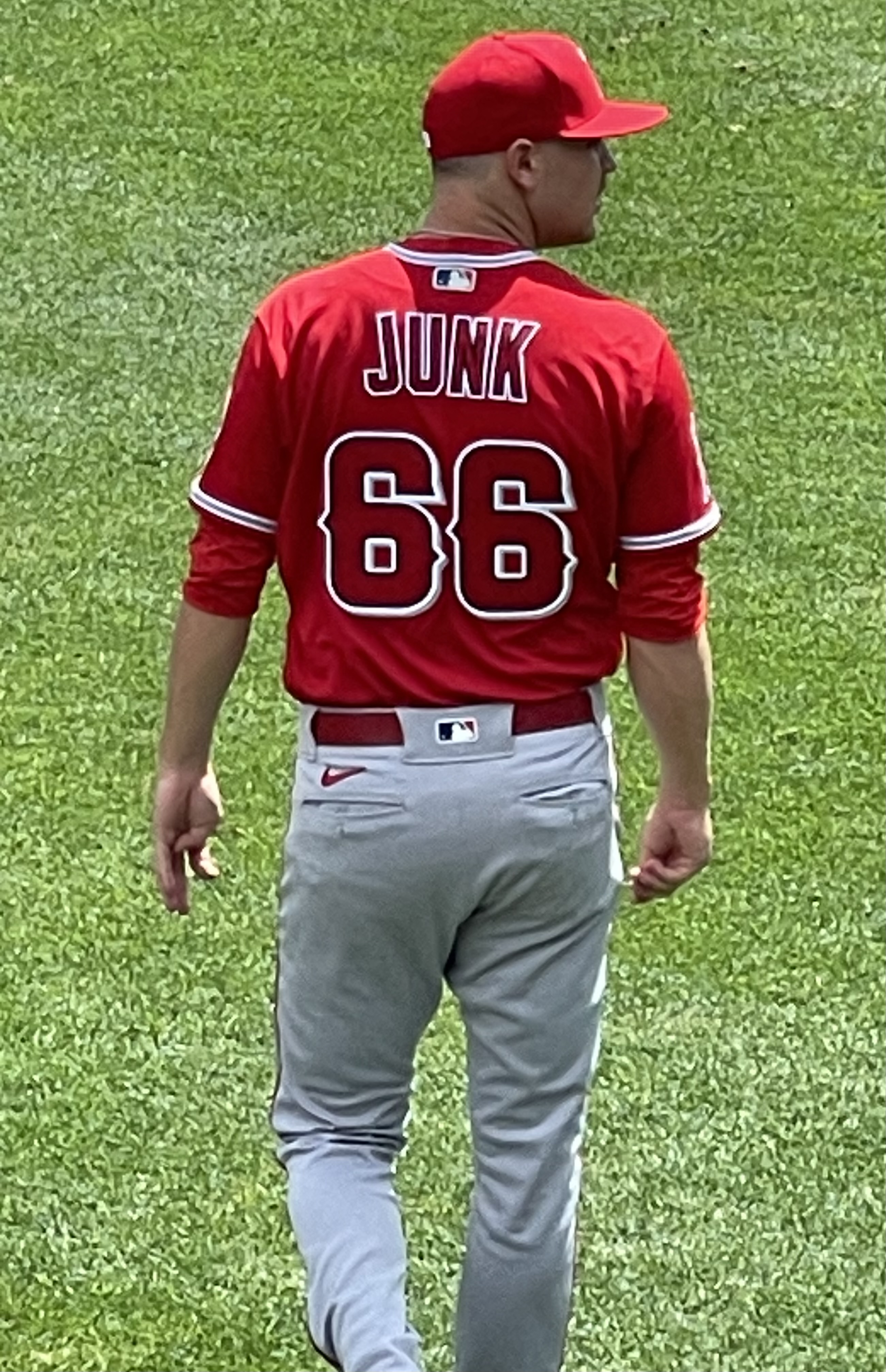
Junk with the Angels

The Yankees traded Junk and Elvis Peguero to the Los Angeles Angels on July 30, 2021, in exchange for Andrew Heaney. On September 3, the Angels selected Junk's contract from the Double-A Rocket City Trash Pandas and added him to their major-league roster. He made his MLB debut two days later, starting against the Texas Rangers and taking the loss. He allowed five runs (four earned) on six hits in 3 2 /3 innings and recorded two strikeouts and one walk.

On July 27, 2022, Junk earned his first career victory after tossing five scoreless innings against the Kansas City Royals.

=== Milwaukee Brewers ===
On November 22, 2022, the Angels traded Junk, Elvis Peguero, and Adam Seminaris to the Milwaukee Brewers for Hunter Renfroe. Junk was optioned to the Triple-A Nashville Sounds to begin the 2023 season. He made only 2 appearances for the Brewers during the season, allowing 5 runs (4 earned) on 8 hits with 5 strikeouts across 7 1/3 innings pitched.

Junk was again optioned to Triple–A Nashville to begin the 2024 season. In 5 appearances for Milwaukee, he posted a 6.75 ERA with 8 strikeouts across 8 innings pitched. Junk was designated for assignment by the Brewers on July 28.

=== Houston Astros ===
On August 2, 2024, Junk was claimed off waivers by the Houston Astros. In 4 starts for the Triple–A Sugar Land Space Cowboys, he struggled to a 6.14 ERA with 10 strikeouts over 14 2/3 innings pitched. On August 29, Junk was designated for assignment by the Astros.

=== Oakland Athletics ===
On August 31, 2024, Junk was claimed off waivers by the Oakland Athletics. He made one appearance for Oakland, allowing six hits and two walks without recording an out against the Seattle Mariners. Junk was designated for assignment by Oakland on September 5. He cleared waivers and was sent outright to the Triple–A Las Vegas Aviators on September 7. Junk elected free agency following the season on November 4.

=== Miami Marlins ===
On February 10, 2025, Junk signed a minor league contract with the Miami Marlins that included an invitation to spring training. In nine appearances (eight starts) for the Triple-A Jacksonville Jumbo Shrimp, he logged a 4-3 record and 2.78 ERA with 40 strikeouts across 45 1/3 innings pitched. On May 24, the Marlins selected Junk's contract, adding him to their active roster. He made 21 appearances (16 starts) for Miami, compiling a 6-4 record and 4.17 ERA with 77 strikeouts and one save over 110 innings of work.

On March 20, 2026, the Marlins announced Junk as their fifth starter entering the season, beating out Braxton Garrett for the role.
