= Chris Roller =

American baseball player (born 1996)

Long Island Ducks – No. 5
- Outfielder
- Born: October 8, 1996 (age 29); Austin, Texas, U.S.
- Bats: Right Throws: Right

MLB debut
- May 15, 2024, for the Milwaukee Brewers

MLB statistics (through 2024 season)
- Batting average: .000
- Home runs: 0
- Runs batted in: 0
- Stats at Baseball Reference

Teams
- Milwaukee Brewers (2024)

Christopher P. Roller (born October 8, 1996) is an American professional baseball outfielder for the Long Island Ducks of the Atlantic League of Professional Baseball. He has previously played in Major League Baseball (MLB) for the Milwaukee Brewers.

== Career ==
=== Amateur career ===
Roller attended Lake Travis High School in Austin, Texas. He was named to the all-state teams for baseball as an outfielder and American football as a defensive back. Roller did not receive any offers from NCAA Division I universities to play college baseball, so he enrolled at McLennan Community College. In 2016, his freshman year, he played in 33 of the team's' 57 games, and batted .347 with nine stolen bases and nine runs batted in (RBIs). As a sophomore the following year, he became the team's starting center fielder and batted .414 with 87 runs scored, 92 hits, 26 doubles, and 32 stolen bases, leading the team in those categories, and also hit 10 home runs with 71 RBIs.

=== Los Angeles Dodgers ===
The Los Angeles Dodgers selected Roller in the 30th round, with the 910th overall selection, of the 2017 Major League Baseball draft and he signed with the Dodgers. He made his professional debut for the rookie–level Arizona League Dodgers, hitting .181 in 45 games. Roller split the 2018 season between the rookie–level Ogden Raptors and Single–A Great Lakes Loons, where he played in 54 contests and hit a combined .274/.377/.458 with 6 home runs, 24 RBI, and 12 stolen bases.

He returned to Great Lakes in 2019, playing in 88 games and batting .274/.359/.455 with 7 home runs, 44 RBI, and 10 stolen bases. Roller did not play in a game in 2020 due to the cancellation of the minor league season because of the COVID-19 pandemic.

=== Cleveland Indians/Guardians ===
On December 10, 2020, the Cleveland Indians selected Roller from the Dodgers in the minor league phase of the Rule 5 draft. He returned to action in 2021 with the Double–A Akron RubberDucks, for whom he made 70 appearances and hit .203/.281/.281 with one home run, 27 RBI, and 14 stolen bases.

Roller spent the 2022 season back in Akron, also appearing in three games for the Triple–A Columbus Clippers. In 76 games for Akron, he slashed .212/.308/.328 with 4 home runs, 26 RBI, and 6 stolen bases.

=== Milwaukee Brewers ===
On August 31, 2023, Roller was traded to the Milwaukee Brewers in exchange for cash considerations. In 108 games split between Columbus and the Triple–A Nashville Sounds, he batted a combined .247/.394/.449 with career–highs in home runs (15), RBI (67), and stolen bases (19).

On October 23, 2023, the Brewers added Roller to their 40-man roster to prevent him from reaching minor league free agency. He was optioned to Triple–A Nashville to begin the 2024 season. The Brewers promoted him to the major leagues for the first time on May 15, 2024. He made his MLB debut that night against the Pittsburgh Pirates, striking out against Luis Ortiz in his only at–bat. Roller was designated for assignment by the Brewers on June 29. He cleared waivers and was sent outright to Triple–A Nashville on July 4. Roller elected free agency following the season on November 4.

=== Long Island Ducks ===
On March 13, 2025, Roller signed with the Long Island Ducks of the Atlantic League of Professional Baseball. In 102 appearances for Long Island, Roller batted .251/.346/.439 with 14 home runs, 42 RBI, and 37 stolen bases.

On October 14, 2025, Roller signed with the Cleburne Railroaders of the American Association of Professional Baseball. However, on May 14, 2026, he was traded back to the Ducks without appearing in a game for the Railroaders.

== See also ==
- Rule 5 draft results
