= Elvis Peguero =

Dominican baseball player (born 1997)

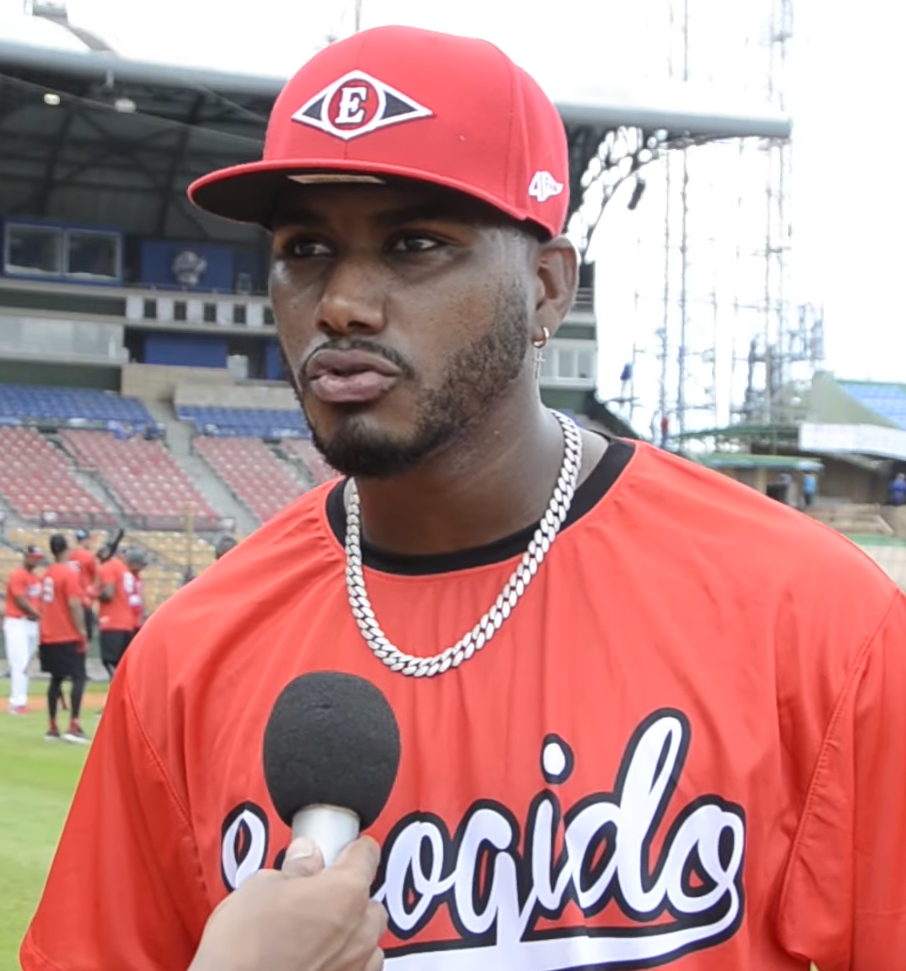
- Peguero with Leones del Escogido in 2022

Baltimore Orioles
- Pitcher
- Born: March 20, 1997 (age 29); Cotuí, Dominican Republic
- Bats: Right Throws: Right

MLB debut
- August 26, 2021, for the Los Angeles Angels

MLB statistics (through 2025 season)
- Win–loss record: 11–10
- Earned run average: 4.26
- Strikeouts: 121
- Stats at Baseball Reference

Teams
- Los Angeles Angels (2021–2022); Milwaukee Brewers (2023–2025); Chicago White Sox (2025)

Elvis Antonio Peguero (born March 20, 1997) is a Dominican professional baseball pitcher in the Baltimore Orioles organization. He was signed as an international free agent by the New York Yankees in 2016 and made his MLB debut with the Los Angeles Angels in 2021. He has also played in MLB for the Milwaukee Brewers and Chicago White Sox.

== Professional career ==
=== New York Yankees ===
The New York Yankees signed Peguero as an international free agent on July 2, 2015. Peguero spent the 2016 season with the Dominican Summer League Yankees. He went 2–7 with a 4.39 ERA and 43 strikeouts. Peguero was assigned to the Gulf Coast League Yankees to begin the 2017 season. After making 7 appearances, going 1–1 with an ERA of 3.00 with 5 strikeouts for the GCL Yankees, he was optioned back to the DSL Yankees, where he struggled to an 0–3 record with a 8.76 ERA with 16 strikeouts through 3 starts. Peguero spent the entire 2018 season with the GCL Yankees, where he made 9 appearances, going 0–3 with a 6.25 ERA and 23 strikeouts.

Peguero spent the 2019 season with the Pulaski Yankees. He made 15 appearances for Pulaski, going 2–2 with a 4.19 ERA and 29 strikeouts. Peguero did not play in a game in 2020 due to the cancellation of the minor league season because of the COVID-19 pandemic. He began the 2021 season with the High-A Hudson Valley Renegades. He made 15 appearances for Hudson Valley, going 3–1 with a 2.51 ERA and 40 strikeouts. On July 6, 2021, Peguero was assigned to the Double-A Somerset Patriots. In 6 appearances for Somerset, he went 1–0 with a 1.50 ERA and 17 strikeouts.

=== Los Angeles Angels ===
On July 30, 2021, Peguero and Janson Junk were traded to the Los Angeles Angels in exchange for Andrew Heaney. The Angels assigned him to the Double-A Rocket City Trash Pandas, where he made four appearances, going 1–1 with an 8.44 ERA and eight strikeouts. On August 19, he was promoted to the Triple-A Salt Lake Bees. Peguero only made one appearance for Salt Lake, pitching two scoreless innings. On August 25, the Angels selected Peguero's contract. He made his major-league debut on August 26 against the Baltimore Orioles, getting two outs and giving up five runs. On September 17, Peguero was removed from the 40-man roster and returned to Triple-A.

Peguero was re-selected to the 40-man roster following the season on November 19, 2021, to be protected from the Rule 5 draft. Peguero made 13 appearances for the Angels in 2022, struggling to a 6.75 ERA with 12 strikeouts in 17.1 innings pitched. He spent the rest of his time with Triple-A Salt Lake, where he registered a 4–1 record and 2.84 ERA with 50 strikeouts and 5 saves in 38 appearances.

=== Milwaukee Brewers ===
On November 22, 2022, the Angels traded Peguero, Janson Junk, and Adam Seminaris to the Milwaukee Brewers for Hunter Renfroe. Peguero was optioned to the Triple-A Nashville Sounds to begin the 2023 season. He made his Brewers debut against the Boston Red Sox on April 23, where he threw 1 1/3 innings while giving up one hit and striking out two. Peguero made 59 total appearances for Milwaukee during the year, posting a 4–5 record and 3.38 ERA with 54 strikeouts and one save across 61 1/3 innings pitched.

Peguero made 52 appearances out of the bullpen for the Brewers during the 2024 season, registering a 7–4 record and 2.98 ERA with 47 strikeouts and two saves across 51 1/3 innings pitched.

Peguero pitched in six contests for Milwaukee in 2025, recording a 4.91 ERA with five strikeouts across 7 1/3 innings pitched. He was designated for assignment on July 31, 2025.

=== Chicago White Sox ===
On August 3, 2025, Peguero was claimed off waivers by the Chicago White Sox. He made two appearances (one start) for Chicago, but struggled to a 13.50 ERA with three strikeouts over two innings of work. On October 13, Peguero was removed from the 40-man roster and sent outright to the Triple-A Charlotte Knights. He elected free agency on November 6.

=== Baltimore Orioles ===
On March 24, 2026, Peguero signed a two-year, minor league contract with the Baltimore Orioles. On March 27, he was placed on the full-season injured list ruling him out for the 2026 season.
